= Francisco Tadeo Calomarde, 1st Duke of Santa Isabel =

Spanish politician and noble

The Most Excellent The Duke of Santa Isabel
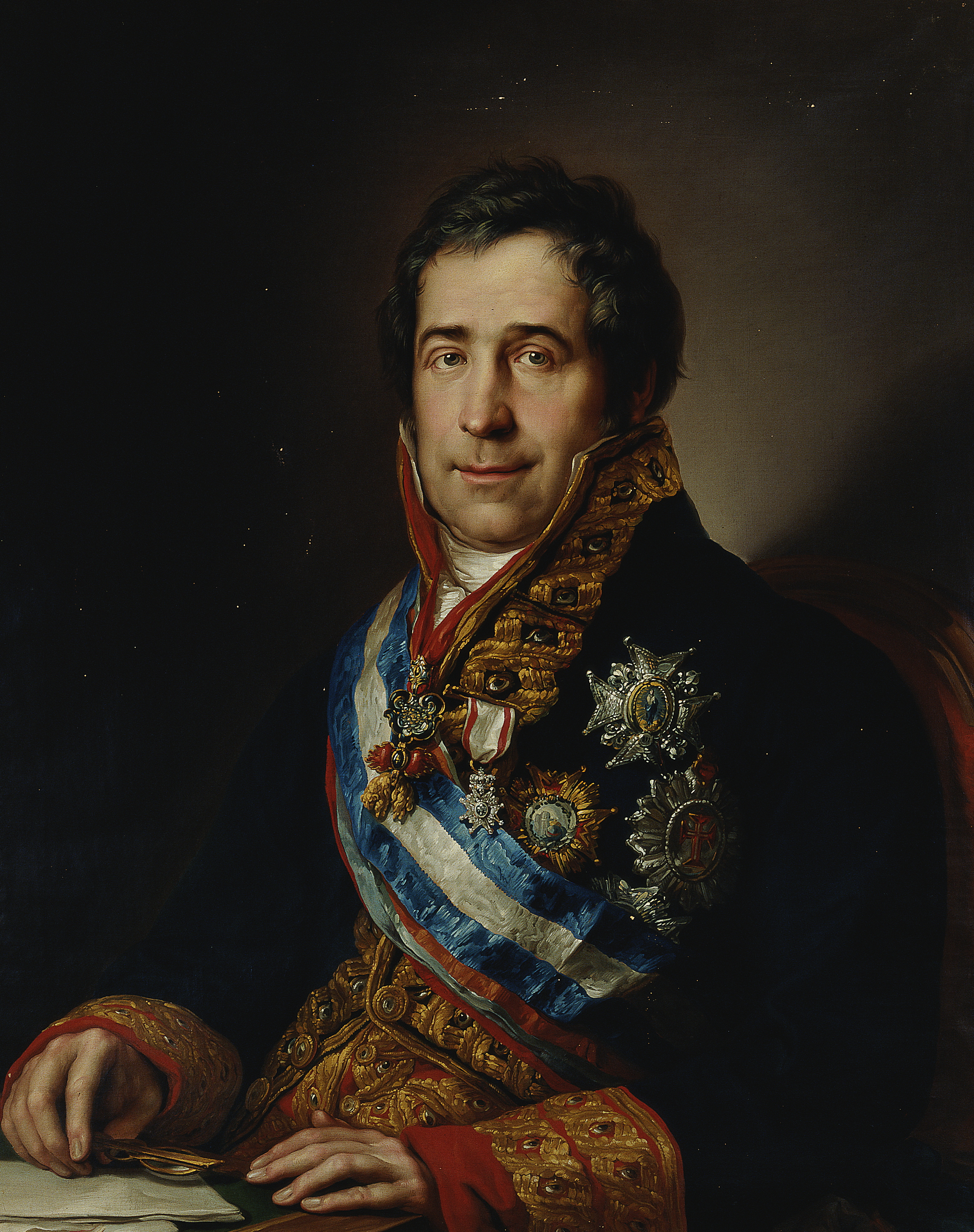
- Portrait by Vicente López Portaña

Acting Prime Minister of Spain
- In office 8 January 1832 – 22 February 1832
- Monarch: Ferdinand VII
- Preceded by: Manuel González Salmón
- Succeeded by: The Count of Alcudia

Personal details
- Born: Francisco Tadeo Calomarde y Arría; 10 February 1773 Villel, Spain
- Died: 19 June 1842 (aged 69) Toulouse, France

Francisco Tadeo Calomarde y Arría, 1st Duke of Santa Isabel (10 February 1773 – 19 June 1842) was a Spanish statesman.

== Biography ==
Calomarde was born in Villel, Aragon, to poor parents.

He studied law in Zaragoza, and secured through the promise of marriage with the ugly niece of the royal personal physician Berga a prestigious position in the ministry of law; upon acquiring the position, he backtracked on his promise of marriage, as a result of which he had to be cajoled into it by the King's prime minister, under the threat of being sent to the galleys. He thereafter became an influential royalist in the most conservative circles of the royal court.

In 1808, Calomarde followed the central junta of Aranjuez, the leader of which he had become, to Seville and Cádiz; however after the return of Ferdinand VII he was the first to acclaim the absolute monarch, for which he was named first administrator at the Secretaria general de Indias. Due to the fraudulent sale of an American diocese, he was banished to Toledo and, after his secret return to Madrid, to Pamplona. After the restitution of the constitution in 1820, he joined the liberals, true to his flawed character, but only gained renewed influence after the abolishment of the constitution in 1823. He became secretary of the regency based in Madrid, and thereafter, as a willing tool of the reactionaries, he was named secretary of the Camara del real patronato, and finally, 1824, Secretary of Justice.

For eight years now the most important matters of the state passed through his hands, and the protection of the weak king secured him unfettered power, which he used to suppress freedom through the secret police, to retrain the Jesuits, restitute the monasteries and ruthlessly prosecute the Liberals. At the same time, he tried to secure the favors of Infante Carlos María Isidro, while he punished the Carlist uprising with great severity. When in September 1832, Ferdinand VII was struck by such a severe stroke of gout that he was presumed dead, Calomarde was the first to greet Carlos as king. When the king recovered, Calomarde tried to persuade him to revoke his decrees and last will and testament, where the princess Isabel was named regent of the country, and to reinstate the Salic law.

The king however, on his unexpected convalescence, declared the change of testament on 31 December 1832 invalid. Calomarde was banished to his estates in Aragon, and his arrest was ordered, but he escaped in disguise to France, where he died in Toulouse.

== See also ==
- Ominous Decade
- Carlism
