= Villel =

- municipality
- Coat of arms

- Location in Spain
- Coordinates: 40°14′N 1°11′W
- Country: Spain
- Autonomous community: Aragon
- Province: Teruel
- Comarca: Comunidad de Teruel

Government
  - Mayor: Juan José Rodero Prieto

Area
  - Total: 85.38 km^{2} (32.97 sq mi)
- Elevation: 883 m (2,897 ft)

Population (2025-01-01)
  - Total: 336
  - Density: 3.94/km^{2} (10.2/sq mi)
- Time zone: UTC+1 (CET)
  - Summer (DST): UTC+2 (CEST)

Villel is a municipality located in the province of Teruel, Aragon, Spain. As of 2022, the municipality has a population of 329 inhabitants.

Villel is home to a ruined medieval castle. It is the birthplace of 19th-century statesman Francisco Tadeo Calomarde.

== See also ==
- List of municipalities in Teruel
