= Bernardo López Piquer =

Spanish painter (1799–1874)

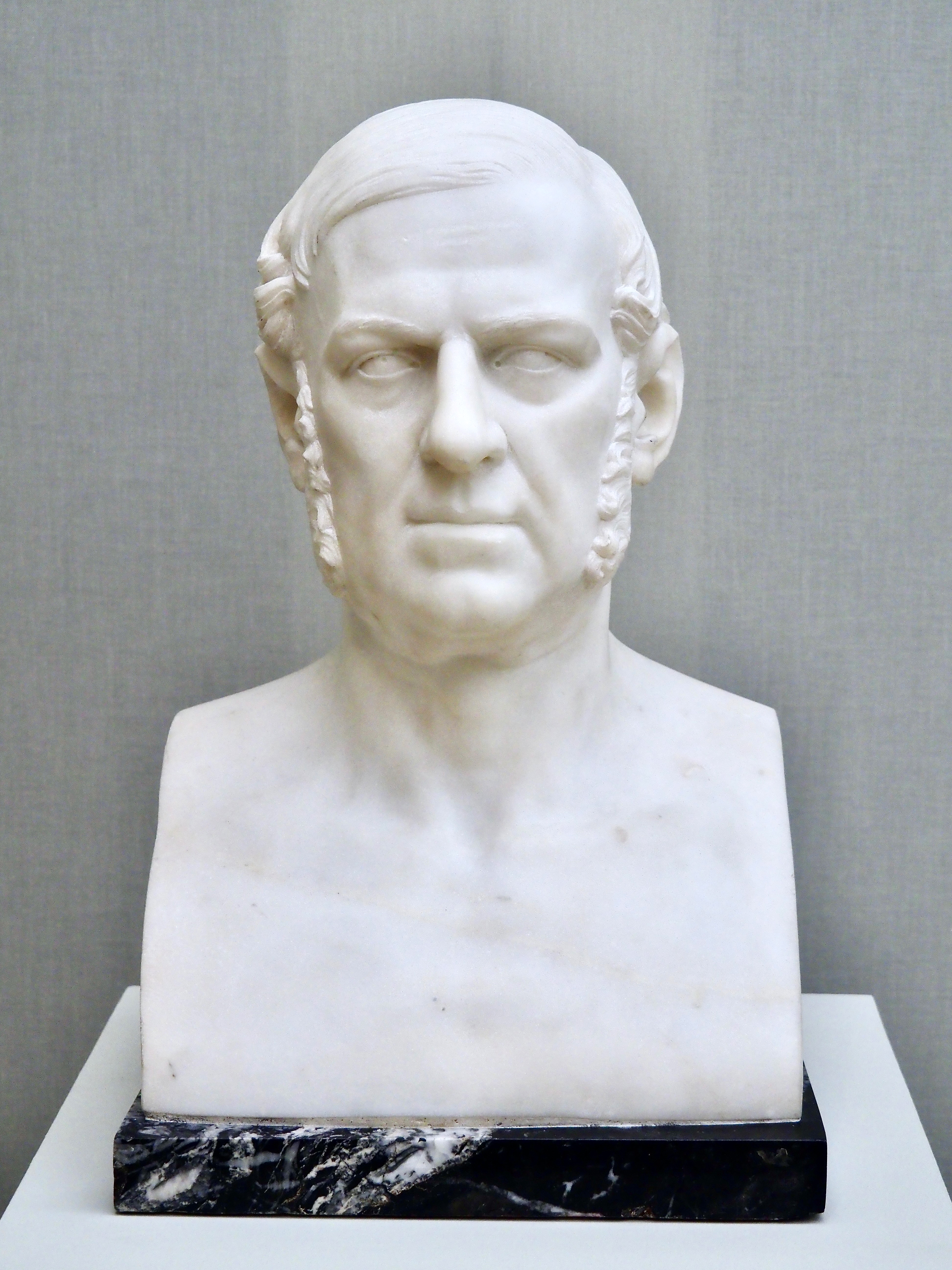
Bust of Bernardo López, by Josep Piquer i Duart (1860s?)

Bernardo López Piquer (20 August 1799, Valencia, Spain – 1 August 1874, Madrid, Spain) was a Spanish portrait painter; noted especially for his pastels.

== Biography ==
His father was the portrait painter, Vicente López Portaña. His brother, Luis, also became a painter. Later, they would work together at Orihuela Cathedral.

He and his brother enrolled at the Real Academia de Bellas Artes de San Fernando in 1825. Thanks to the influence of his father, he was able to find work at the Royal Palace, where he painted portraits in his father's style.

After 1844, he held the position of Director of Studies at the Real Academia. He served as President of the Painting Section from 1845 until his death. From 1843, he was a court painter for Isabel II and was the "Primer Pintor" from 1858 to 1868, when he was dismissed following the Glorious Revolution.

== Notable works ==
- Portrait of Queen Mother Maria Teresa of Braganza
- Portrait of Isabel II
- Portrait of Vicente López
- San Pascual Bailón adorando la Eucaristía
- Portrait of D. Manuel Fernández Varela, Comisario General de Cruzada
- The halberdiers José Díaz and Francisco Torán

== Gallery ==
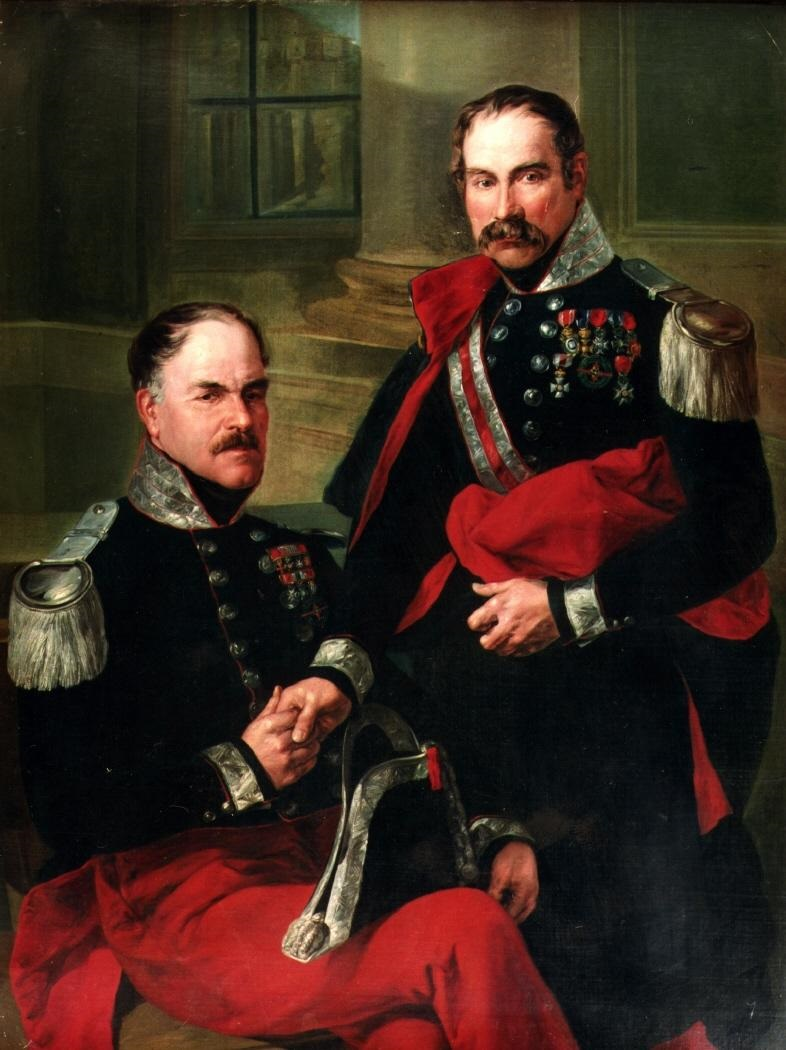
The halberdiers José Díaz and Francisco Torán, 1842. Madrid, Museo Lázaro Galdiano.

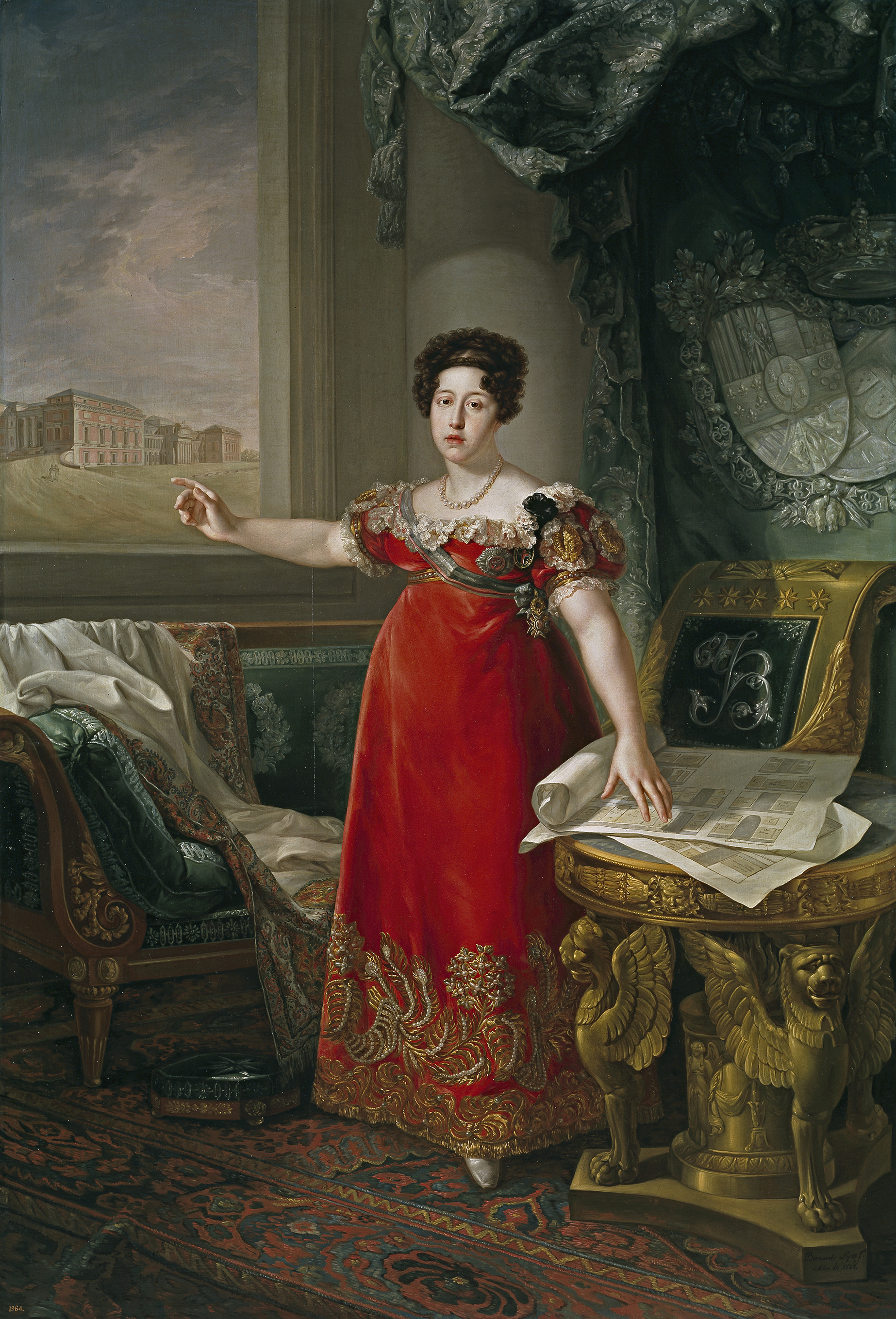
María Isabel de Braganza as founder of the Museo del Prado, 1829. Madrid, Museo del Prado.

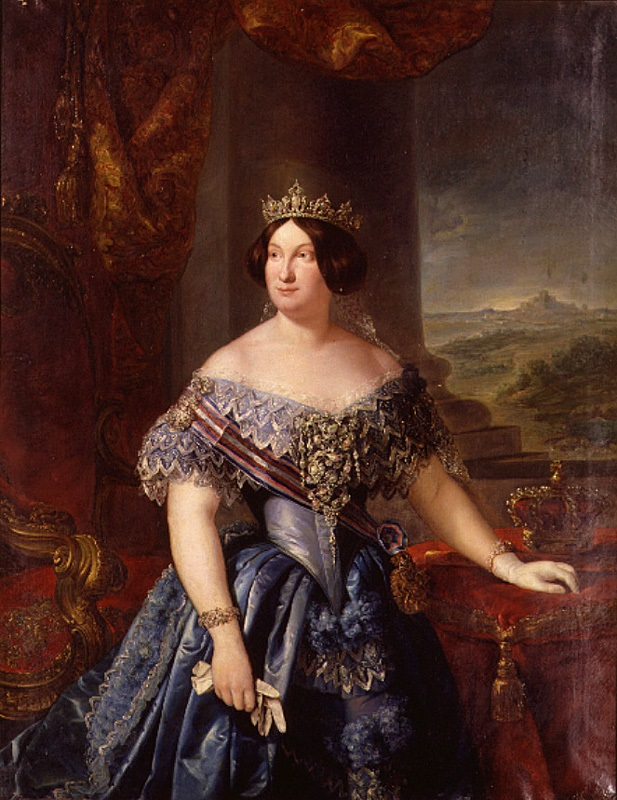
Queen Isabel II of Spain, 1850, Valencia, Museo de Bellas Artes.

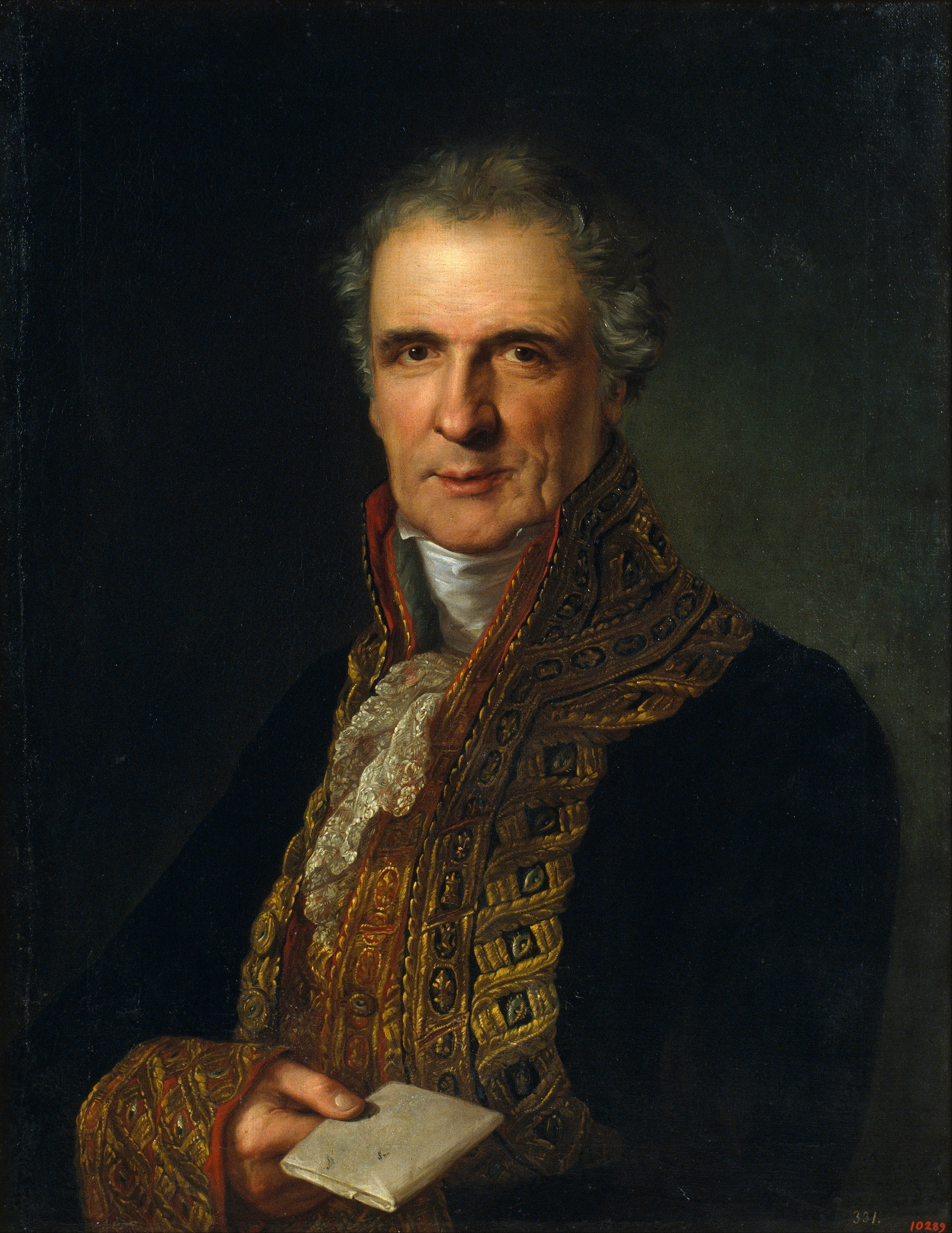
Portrait of José María Díez de Aznar, 1832, Barcelona, MNAC.
