= Manuel González Salmón =

Spanish politician and diplomat

The Most Excellent Manuel González Salmón
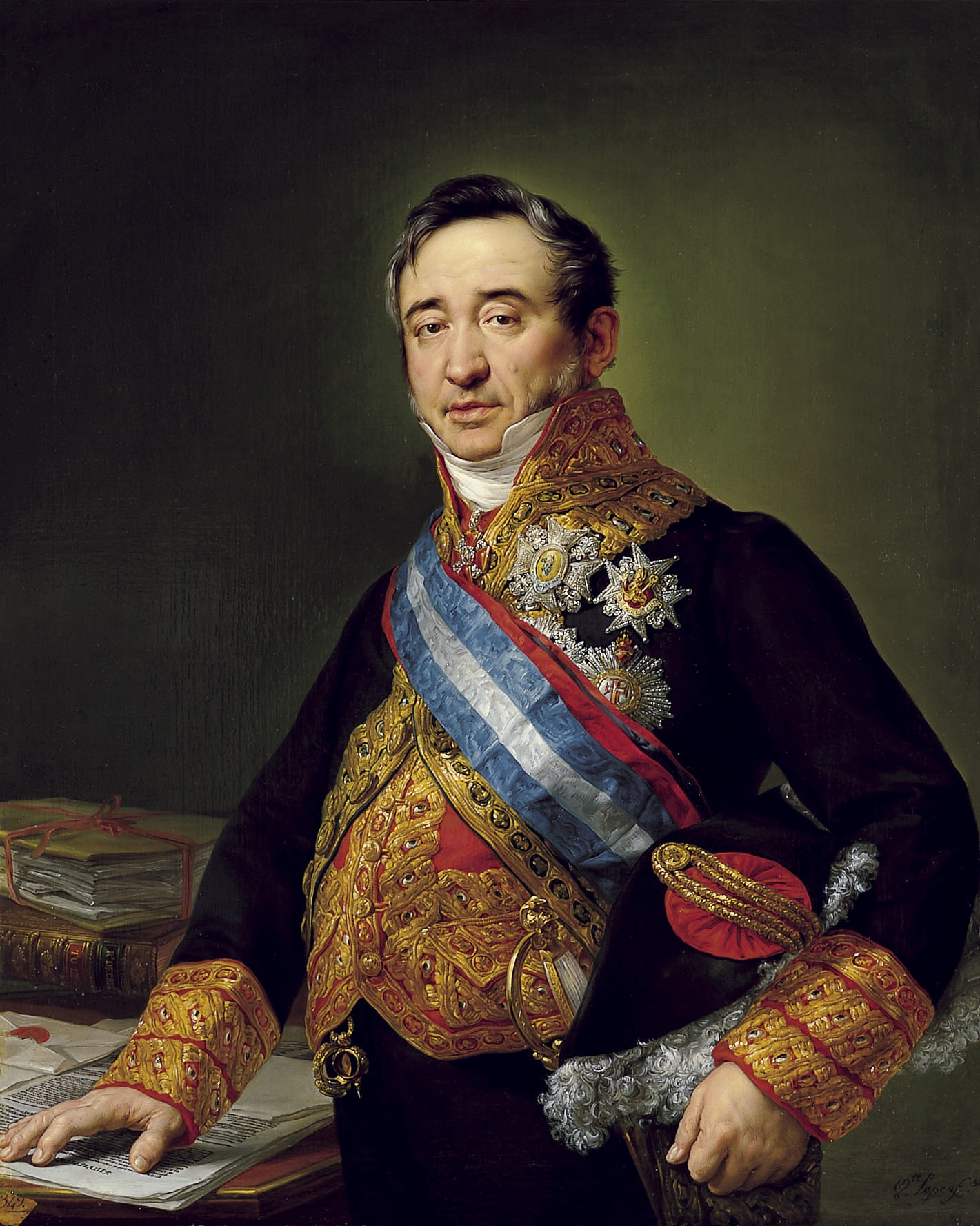
- Portrait by Vicente López Portaña

Prime Minister of Spain
- In office 19 August 1826 – 20 January 1832
- Monarch: Ferdinand VII
- Preceded by: Pedro Alcántara de Toledo
- Succeeded by: The Count of Alcudia (Acting: The Duke of Santa Isabel)

Personal details
- Born: Manuel González Salmón; 18 October 1778 Cádiz, Spain
- Died: 18 January 1832 (aged 53) Madrid, Spain

Manuel González Salmón (18 October 1778, in Cádiz – 18 January 1832, in Madrid), was a Spanish politician and diplomat who served twice as Prime Minister of Spain.

== Biography ==
He was First Secretary at the Spanish Embassy in Paris from 1816 to 1819, when he became Acting Prime Minister of Spain between 12 June and 12 September 1819. After this he became Ambassador to Saxony and later Russia until 1826, when he became Prime Minister for the second time.

Despite the fact that he remained Prime Minister for 6 years, a very long term in Spanish politics, very little was known of his actions during that period. This was because he was dominated by Francisco Calomarde and Luis López Ballesteros, the real leaders of the Cabinet.

He received the titles of Order of Charles III, Military Order of Christ, Order of Saint Januarius, and the Order of Saint Anna. He died in January 1832 while still in office.
