= Vicente López Portaña =

Spanish painter (1772–1850)

Vicente López Portaña OIC
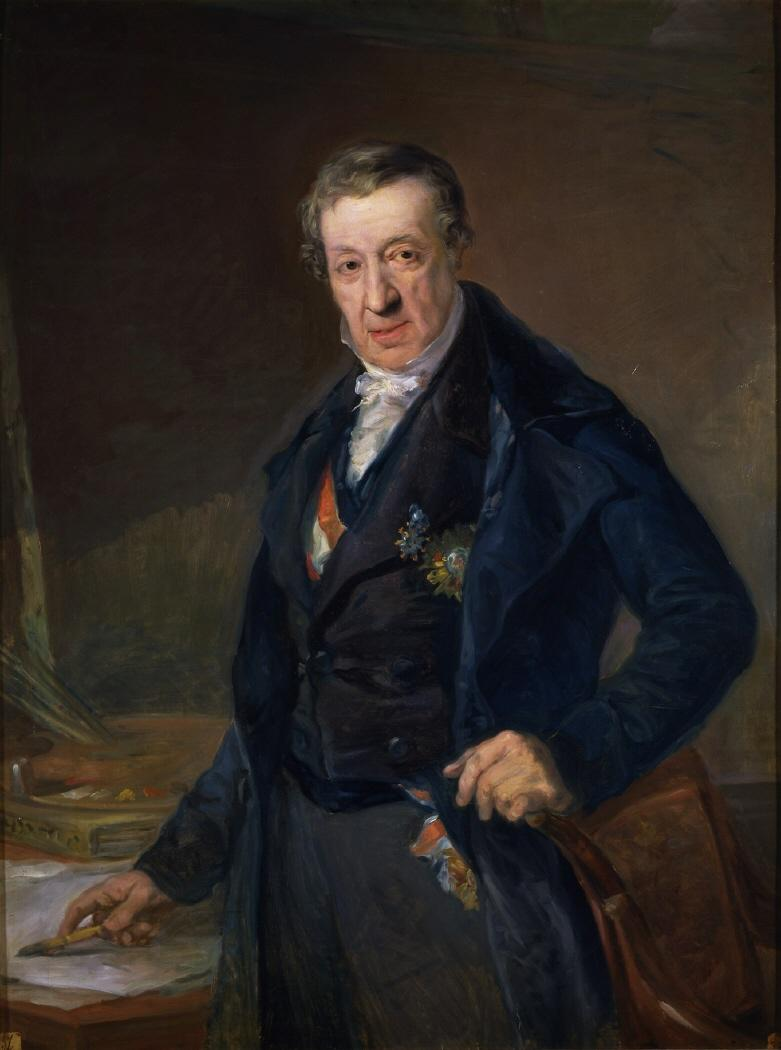
- Painted by his son Bernardo López Piquer
- Born: 19 September 1772; Valencia, Spain
- Died: 22 July 1850 (aged 77); Madrid, Spain
- Known for: Painting

Vicente López Portaña OIC (Spanish: [biˈθente ˈlopeθ poɾˈtaɲa]; 19 September 1772 – 22 July 1850) was a Spanish painter, considered one of the best portrait painters of his time.

== Early life ==
Vicente López Portaña was born in Valencia on 19 September 1772. His parents were Cristóbal López Sanchordi and Manuela Portaña Miró. Vicente López began formally studying painting in Valencia at the age of thirteen, he was a disciple of father Antonio de Villanueva, a Franciscan friar, and he studied at the Academy of San Carlos in his native city. He was seventeen when he won first prize in drawing and coloring receiving a scholarship to study in the prestigious Academia Real de Bellas Artes de San Fernando in Madrid. For the following three years in Madrid, he apprenticed with the Valencian painter, Mariano Salvador Maella. Vicente López returned to Valencia in 1794 and subsequently became vice-director of painting at the Academy where he had studied as a boy. In 1795 he married Maria Piquer, they had two sons: Bernardo and Luis, who were also painters, following their father's style but with little accomplishments. In 1801 López was named President of the Academy of San Carlos.

== Court painter ==
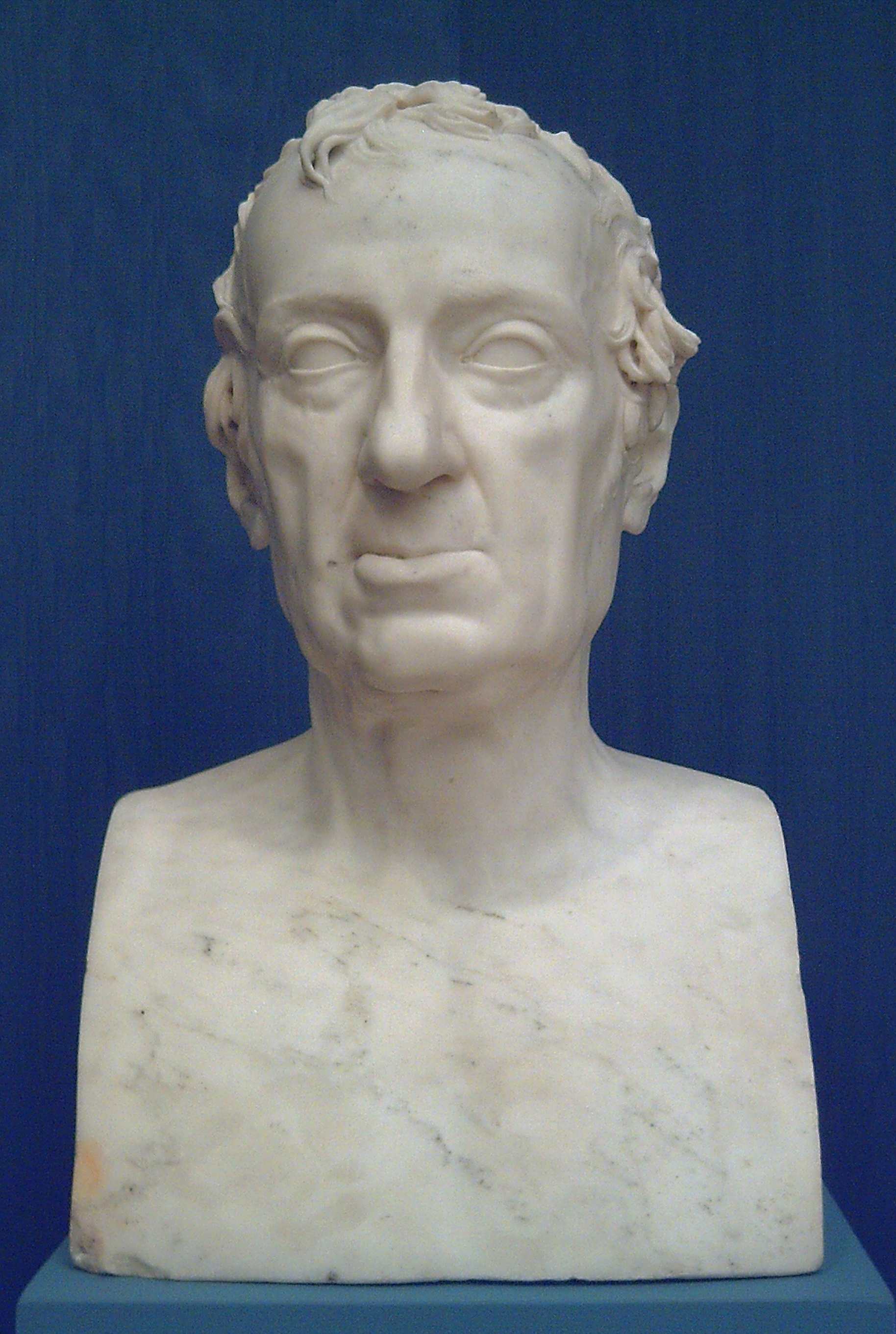
Bust of López, by J. Duart (R.A.B.A.S.F., Madrid).

When king Charles IV visited the city of Turia in 1802, the king appointed him an honorary court painter at the same time he gave him some commissions that he executed successfully. He was already well known and regarded when in 1814 López was called to the court of Ferdinand VII, the Spanish king, who appointed him official court painter and received a royal appointment. Shortly thereafter he succeeded Goya as Royal Court Painter during the reign of Ferdinand VII, who also appointed him as drawing teacher of his second wife, Maria Isabella of Portugal, and later of his third wife, Maria Josepha Amalia of Saxony. In 1817 he was named President of the Real Academia de Bellas Artes de San Fernando.

Vicente López was a prolific painter executing many religious, allegorical, historic and mythological scenes, but he specialized in portraits. During his long career he painted nearly every notable person in Spain during the first half of the 1800s.

In 1826, López painted a portrait of Francisco Goya when the famous master visited the court from Bordeaux, where the Aragonese painter was then living. Goya was then 80 and would die two years later. It was said that Goya got bored posing for his colleague who was very meticulous and a stickler for detail, and that for this reason the portrait is inferior to others by López. However, for this precise reason, and because of the strong personality of the model this is one of López's most lively and best-known works.

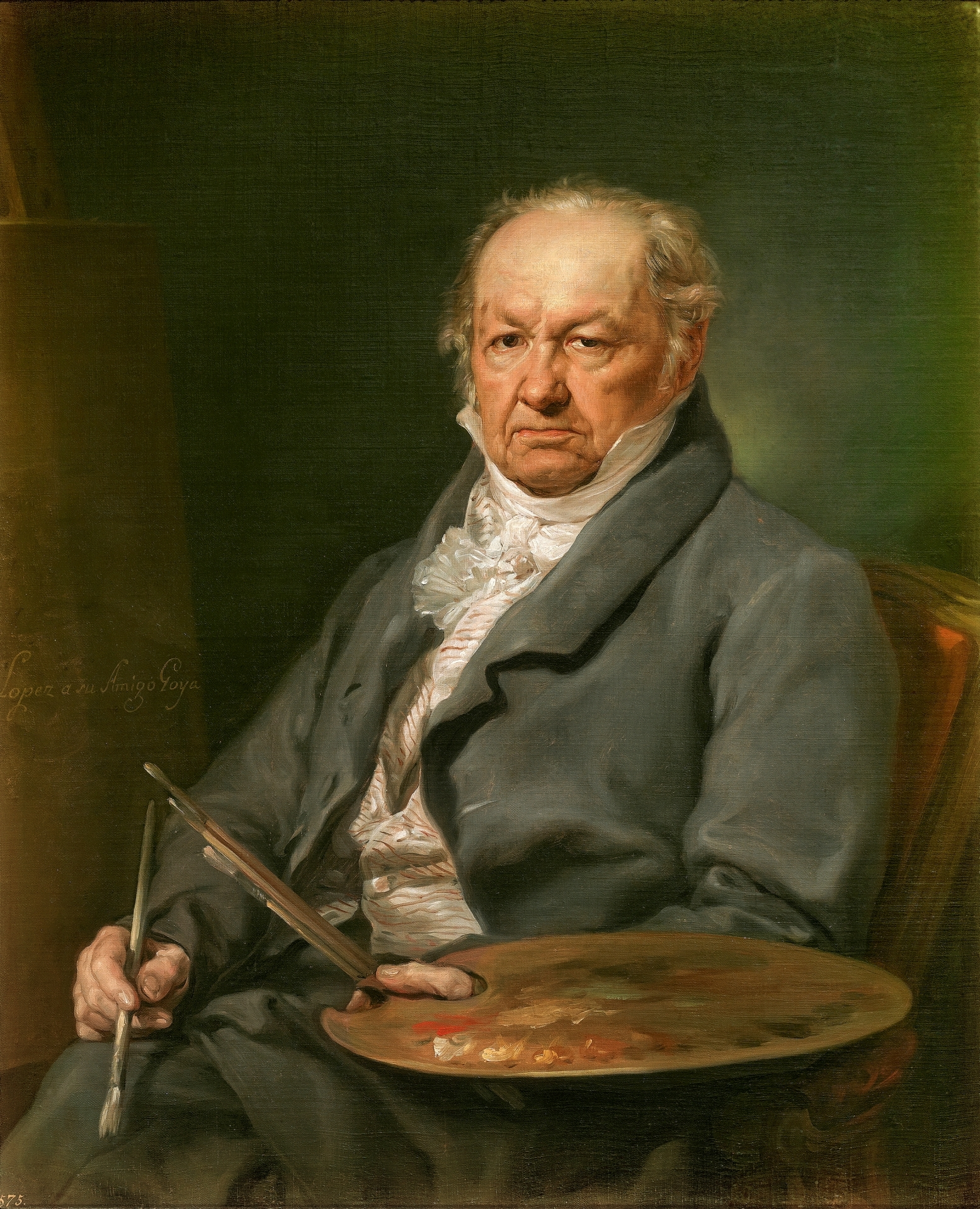
Portrait of Francisco Goya, 1826.

Vicente López spent the remainder of his life in Madrid painting portraits of statesmen, academics, and other important figures, as well as dramatic and emotional religious subjects. When he died, in Madrid, he was court painter of Queen Isabella II. He was seventy seven years old.

== Style ==
Vicente López was a Neoclassicist painter but he retained certain traces of the Rococo style. He had the Neoclassical emphasis on masterly drawing, though with less rigidity. López is considered the best Spanish painter of his time, second only to Francisco José de Goya y Lucientes. One of his rivals was Agustín Esteve Marqués.

López's style is dominated by the influence of Anton Raphael Mengs and the Academicism, and he was unaffected by the romanticism popular at the end of his career.

== Gallery ==
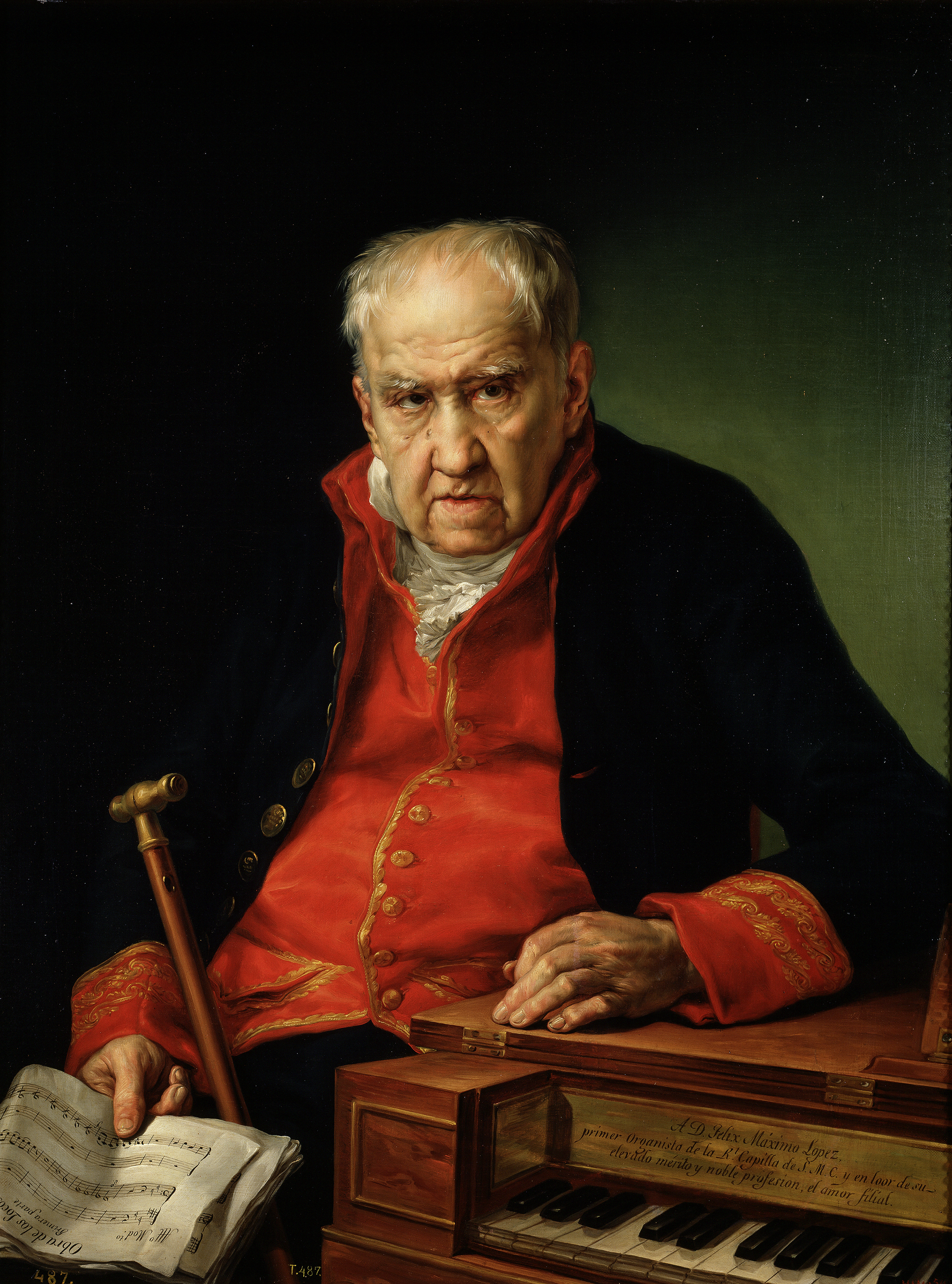
Félix Antonio Máximo López, 1820

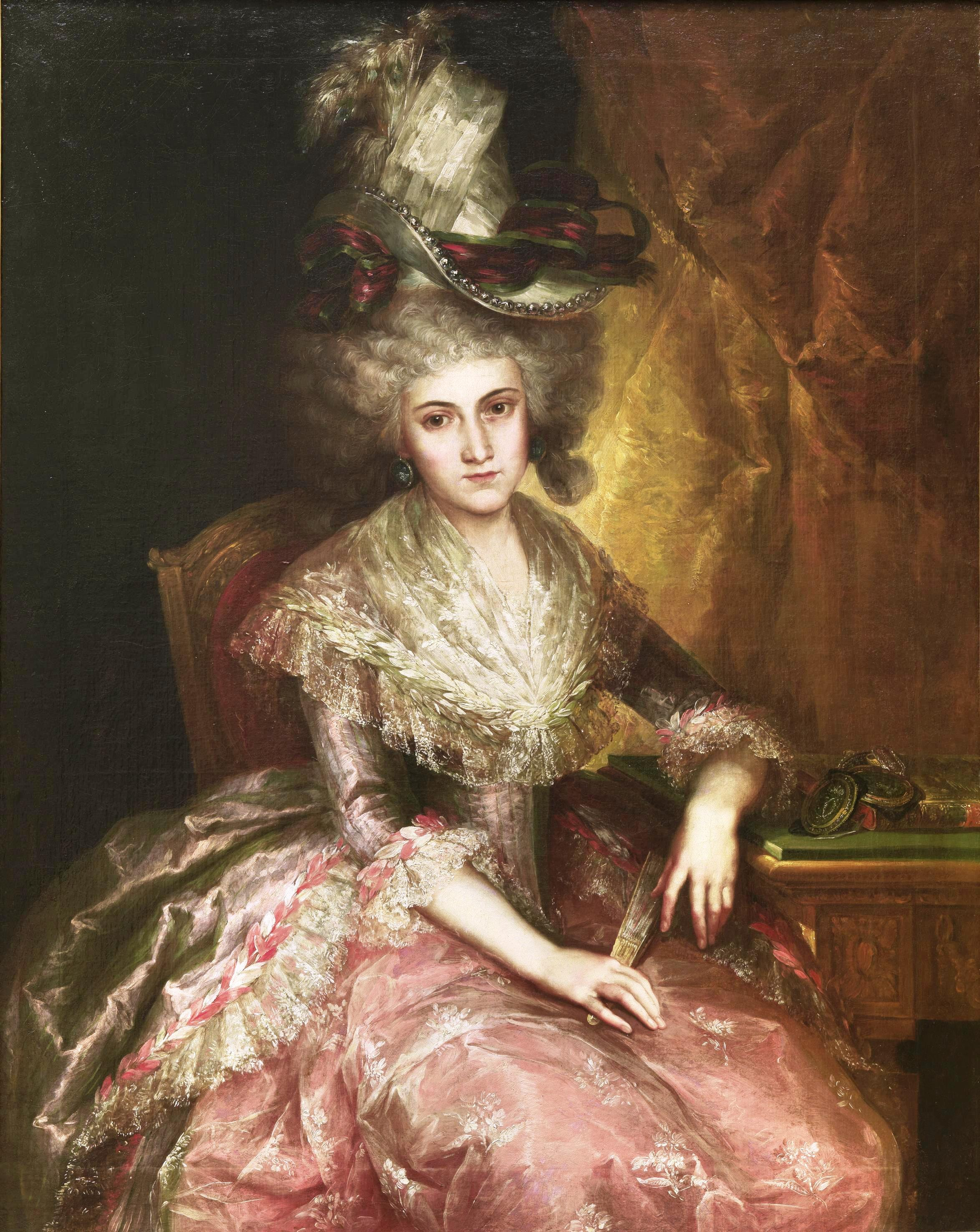
María Pilar de la Cerda y Marín de Resende, 1795

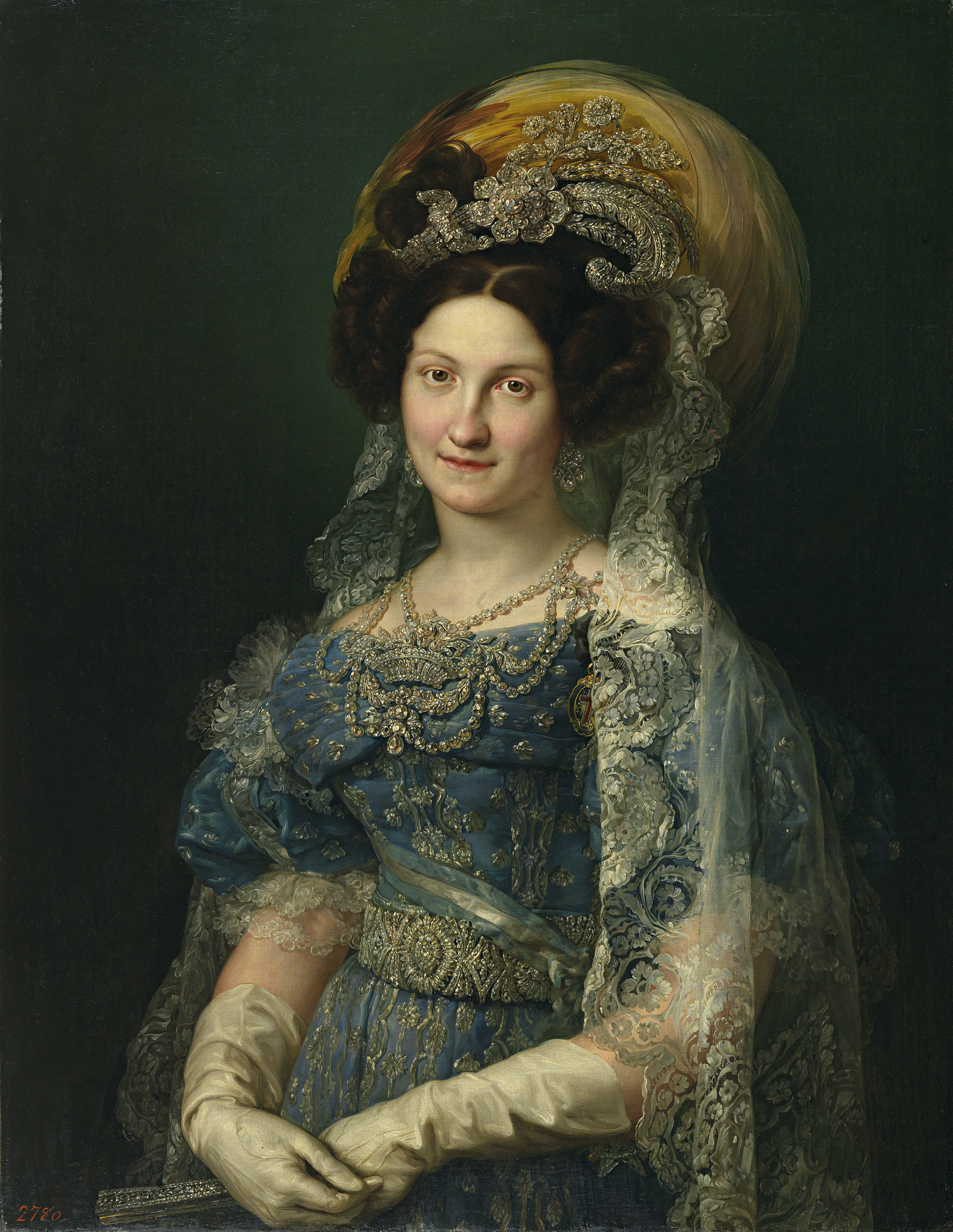
Maria Christina of the Two Sicilies, 1830

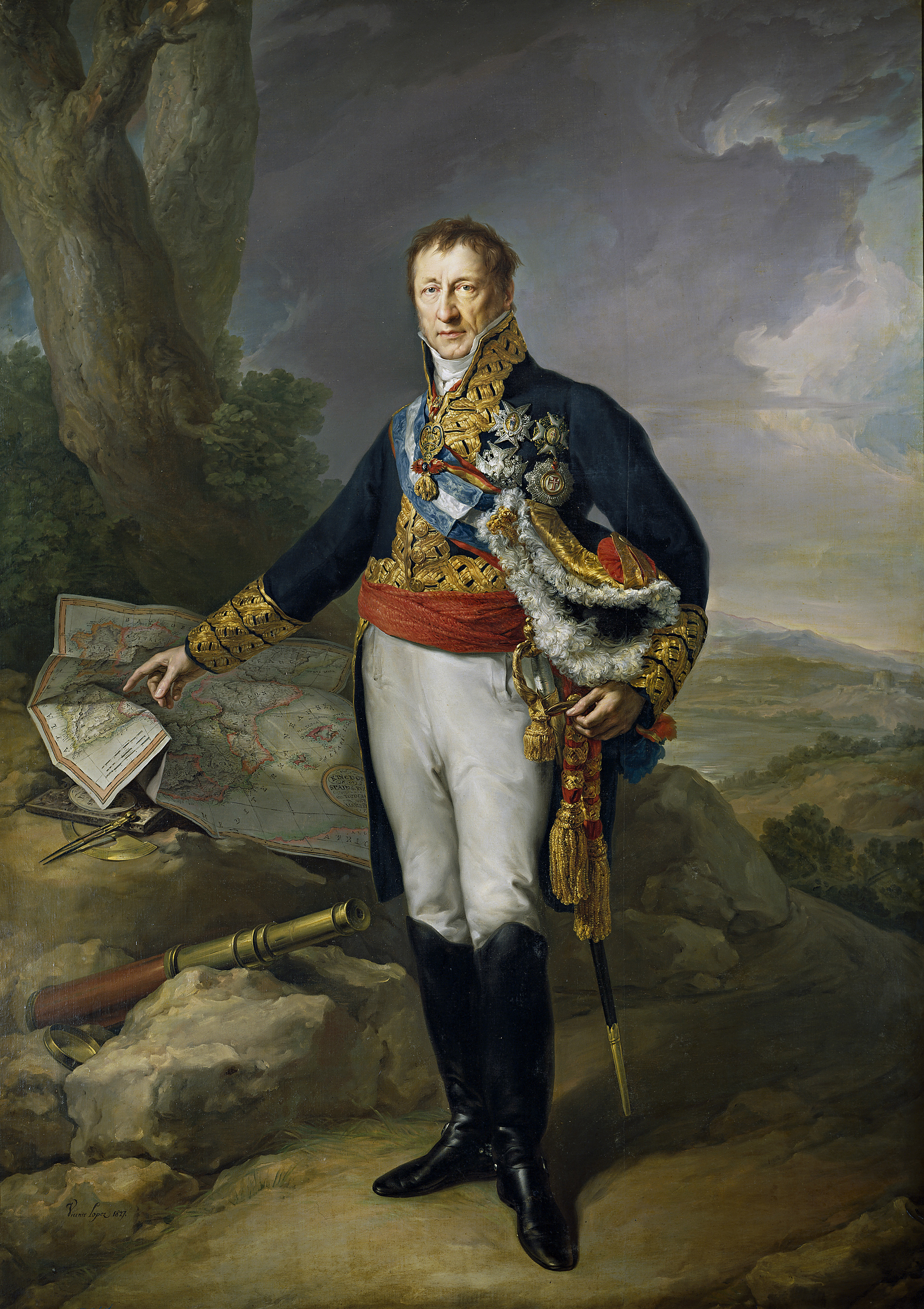
Pedro de Toledo, 13th Duke of the Infantado, 1827

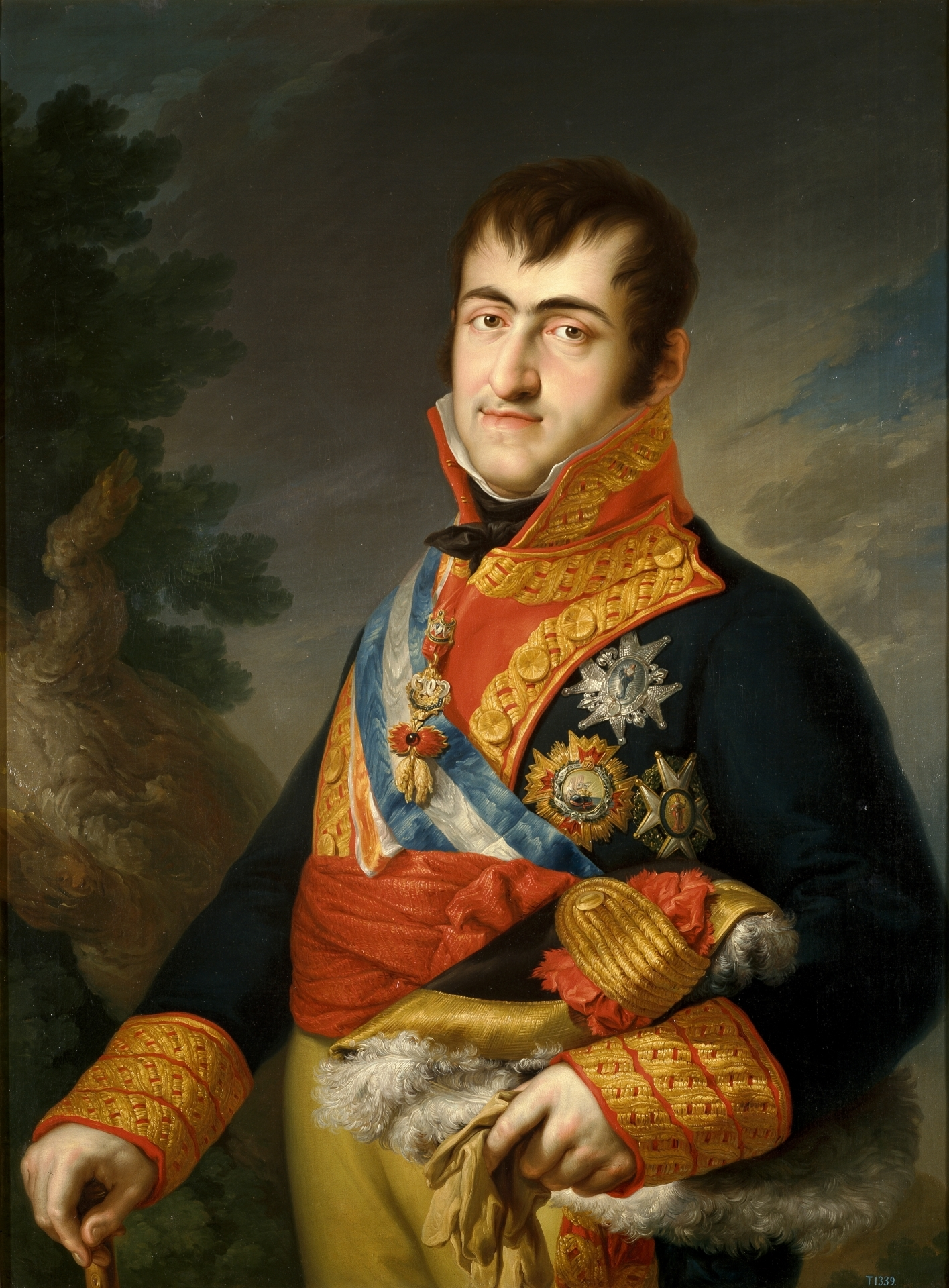
Ferdinand VII of Spain, c. 1814-15

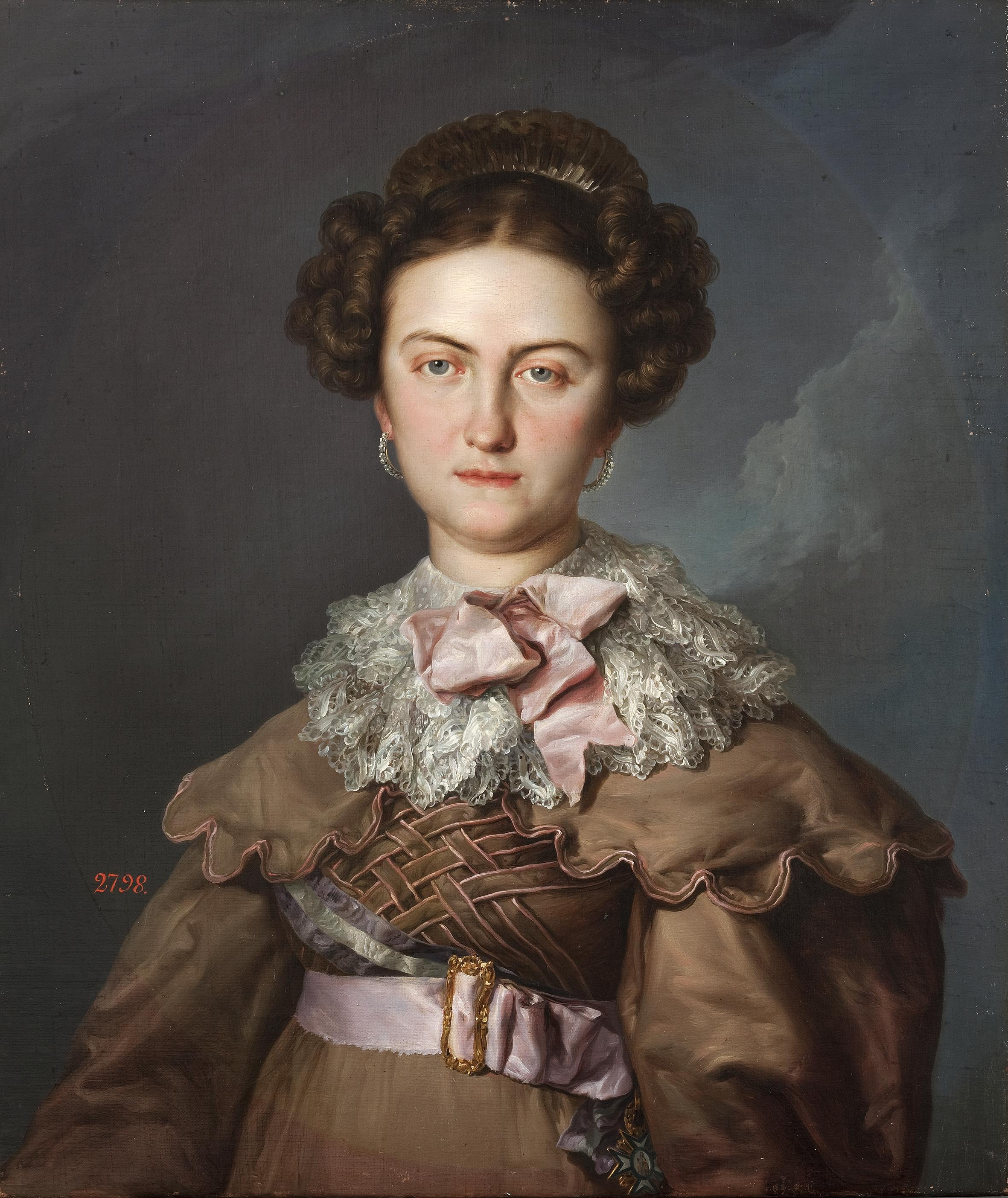
Maria Josepha Amalia of Saxony, 1828

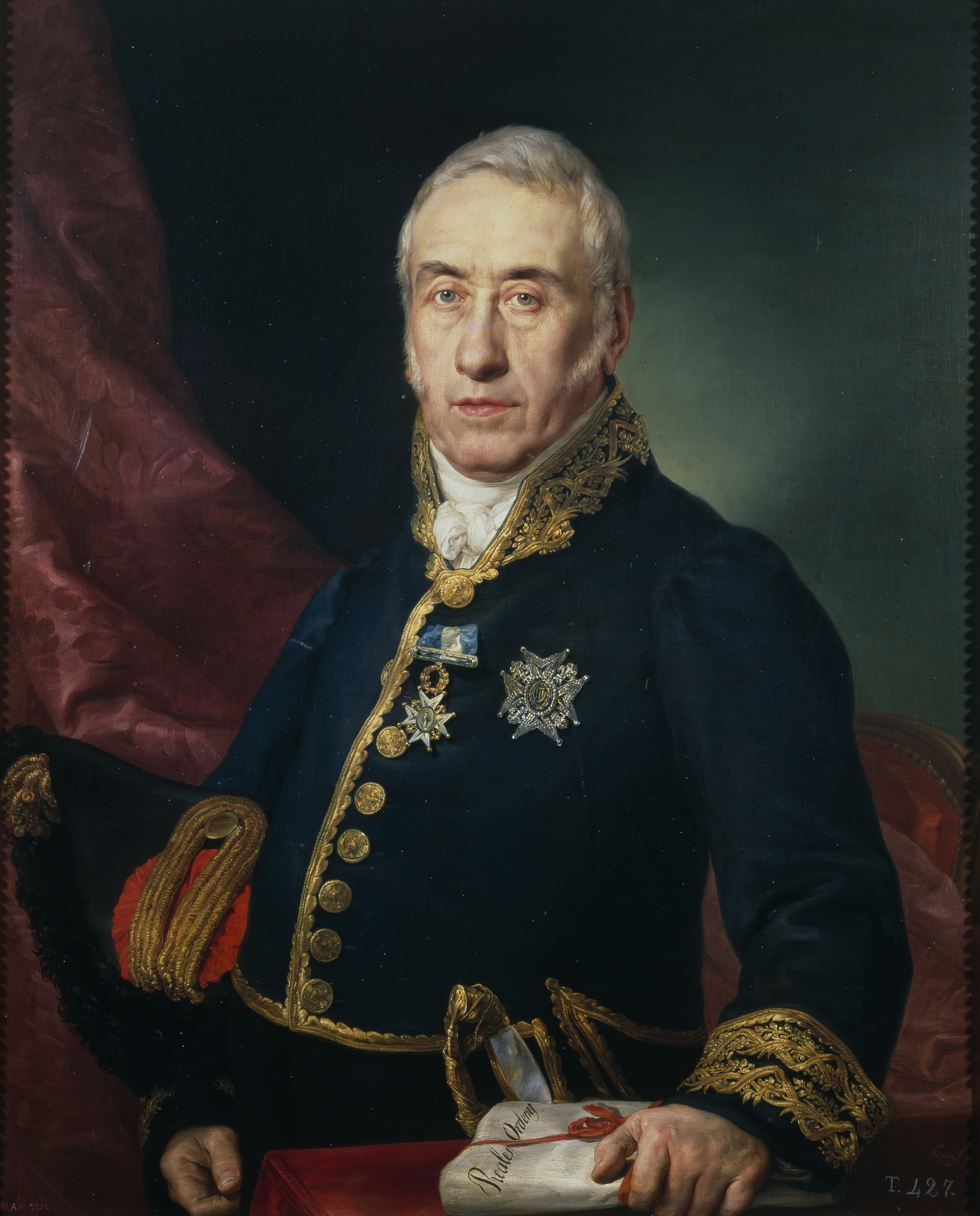
Ignacio Gutiérrez Solana, c. 1823

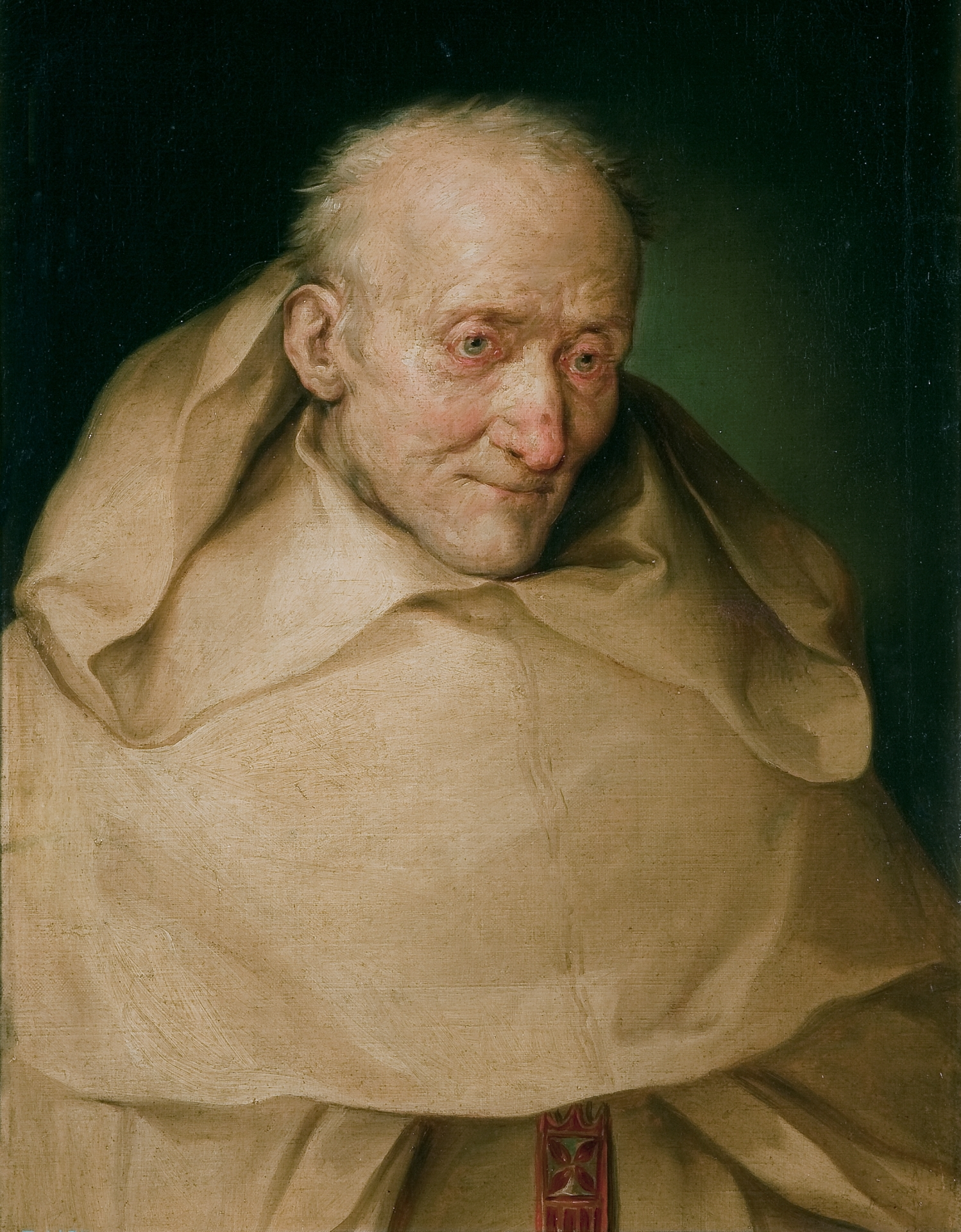
Fray Tomás Gascó, 1794

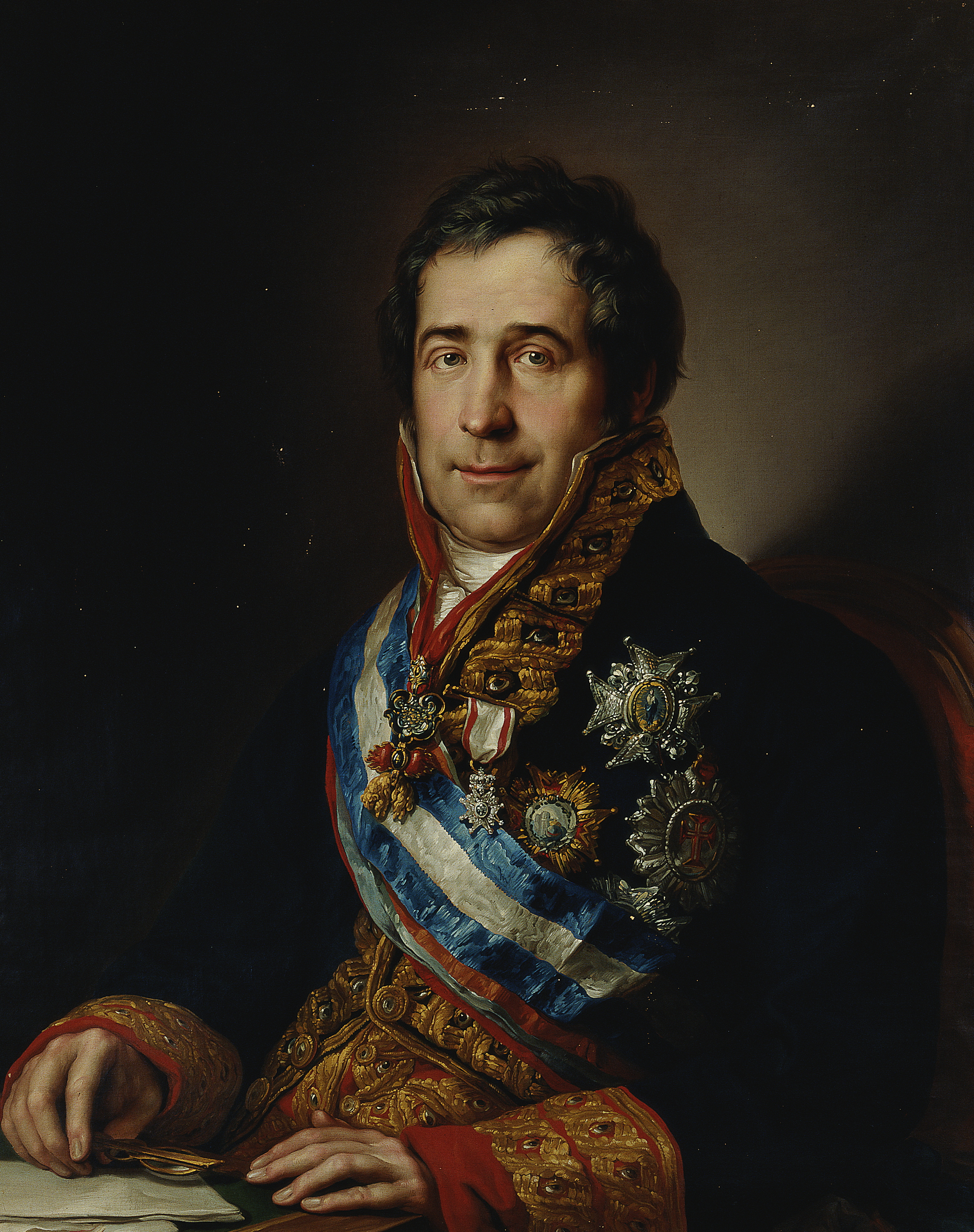
Francisco Tadeo Calomarde, 1st Duke of Santa Isabel, c. 1831

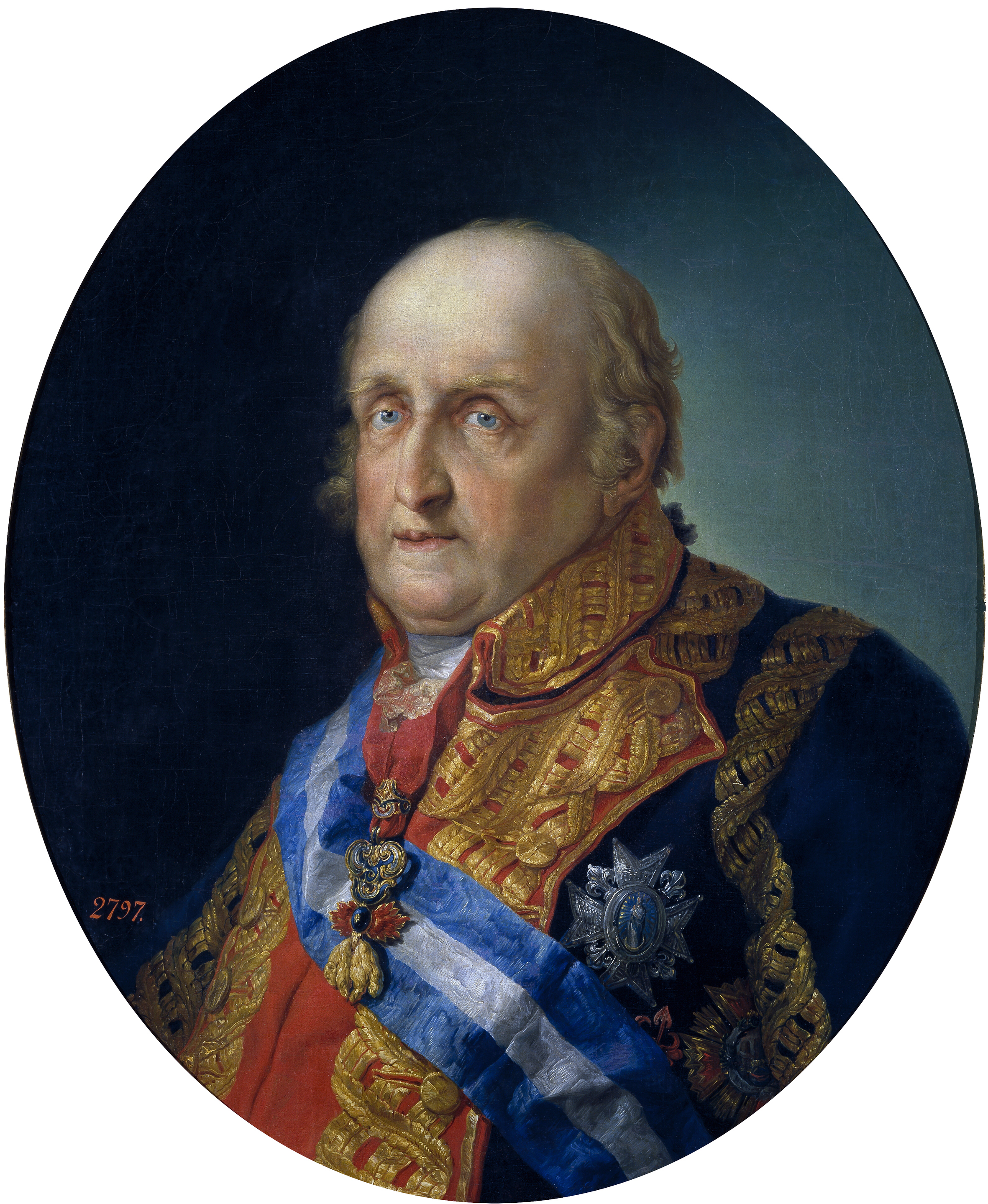
Infante Antonio Pascual of Spain, 1815

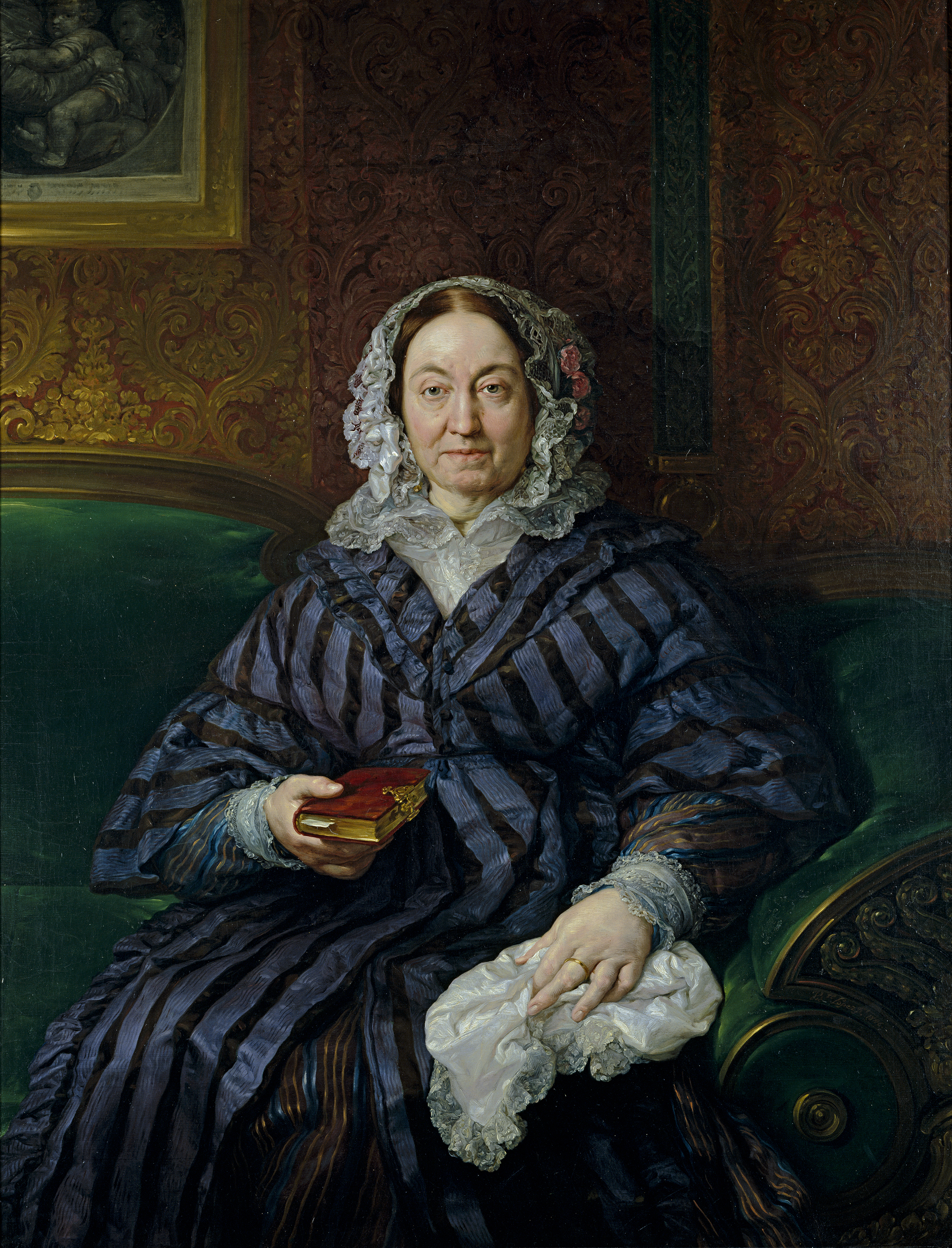
Doña Francisca de la Gándara, 1846

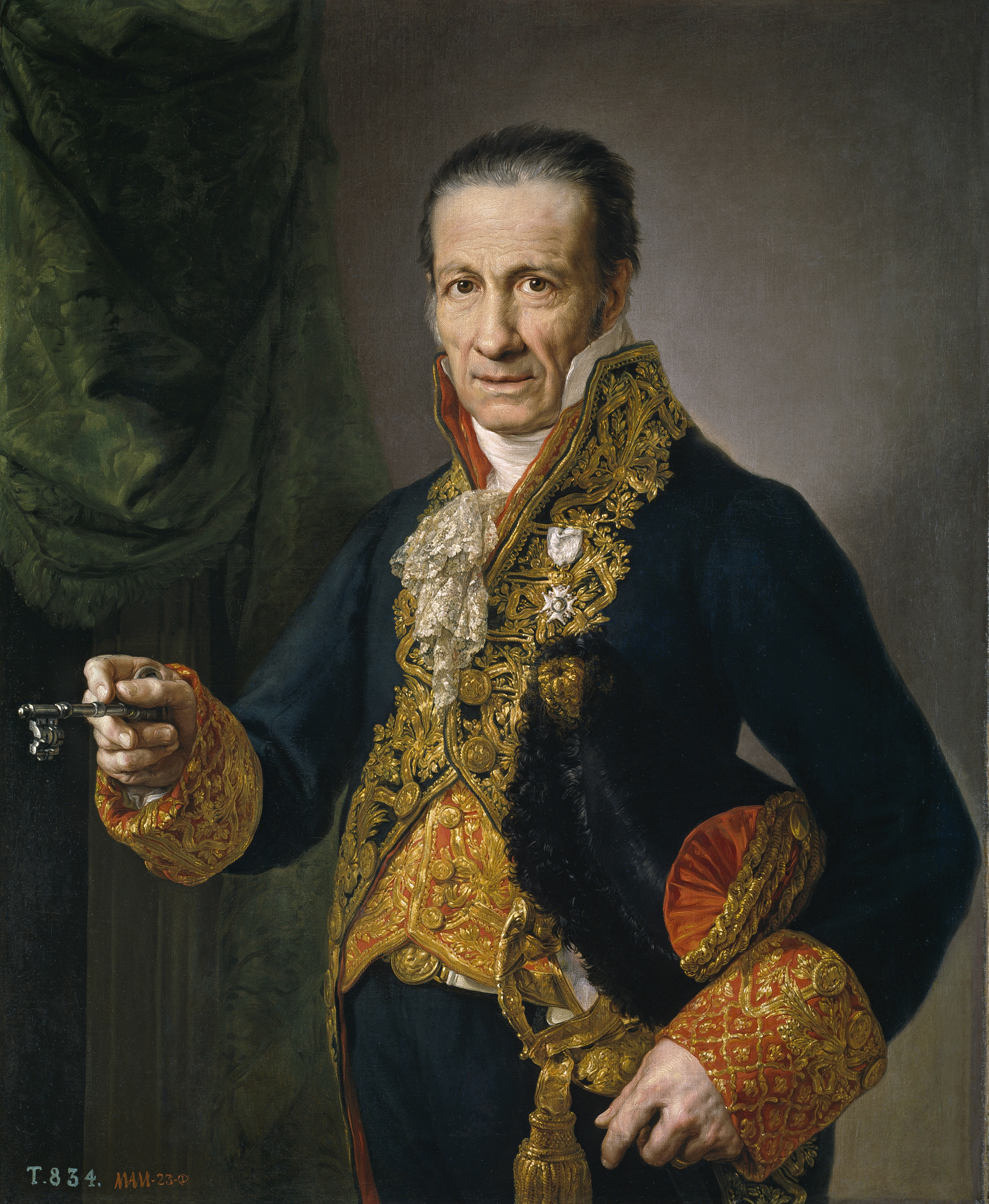
Luis Veldrof, c. 1823-25

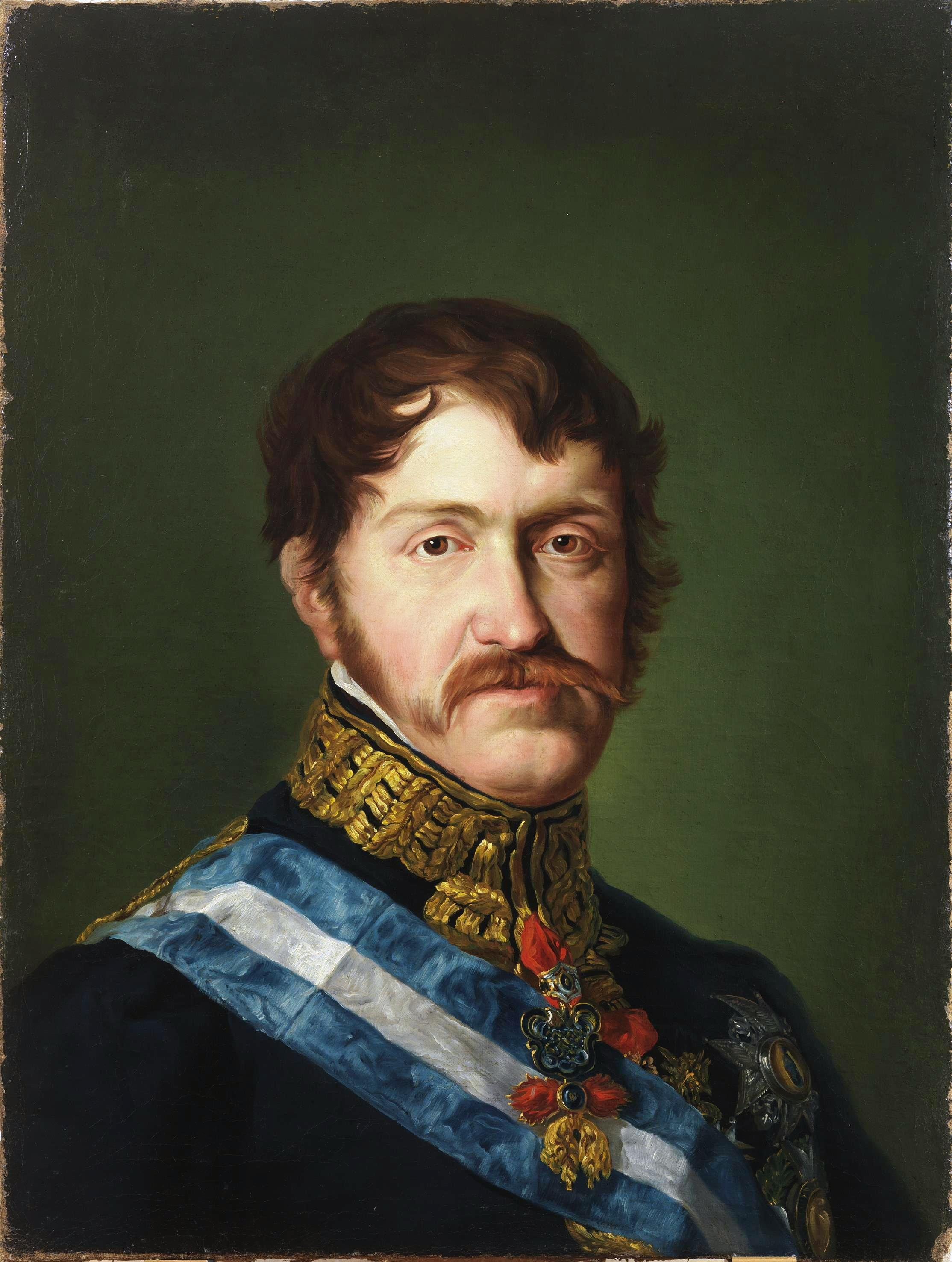
Infante Carlos María Isidro of Spain, 1823

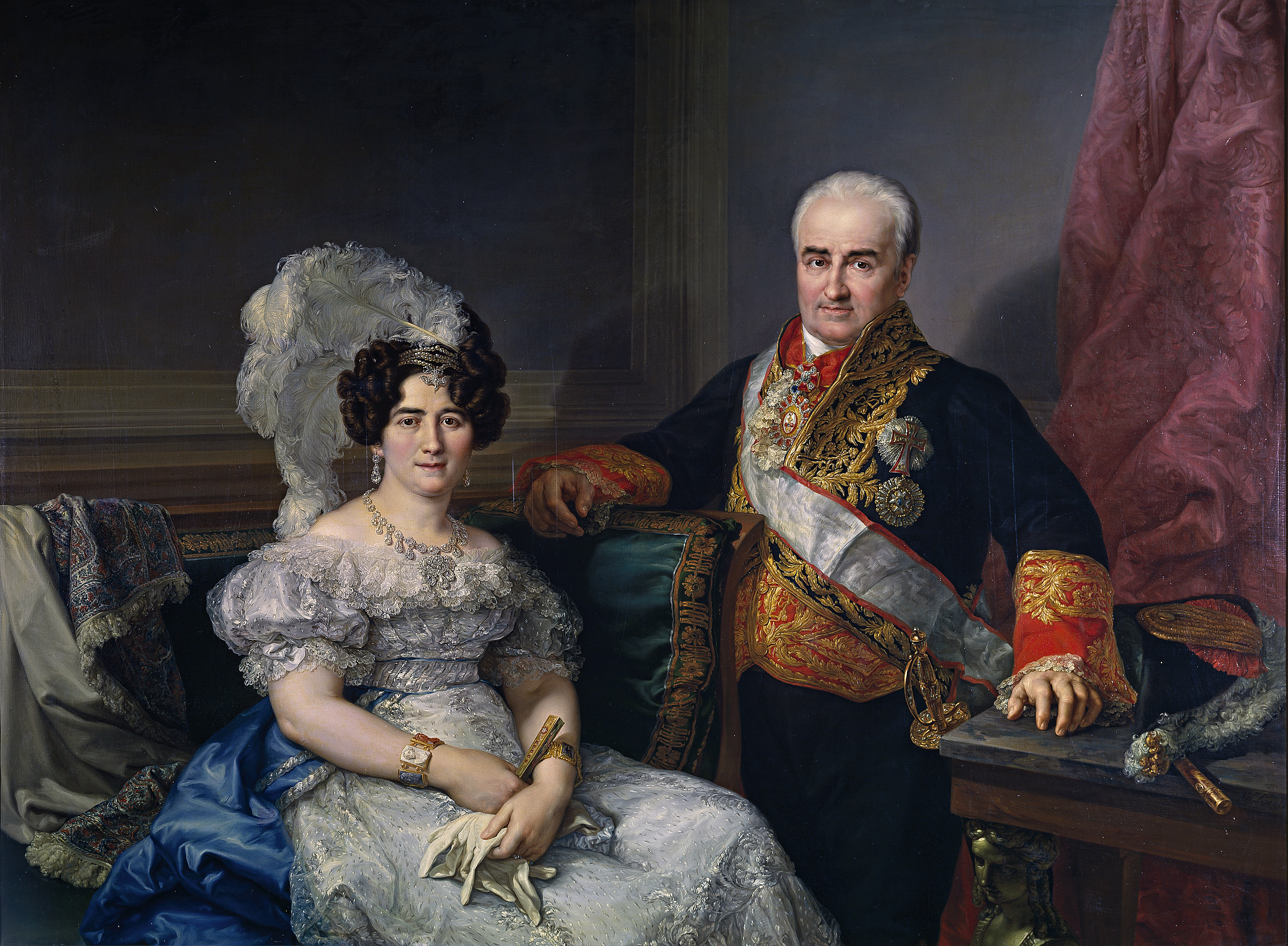
Antonio Ugarte and María Antonia Larrazábal, 1833

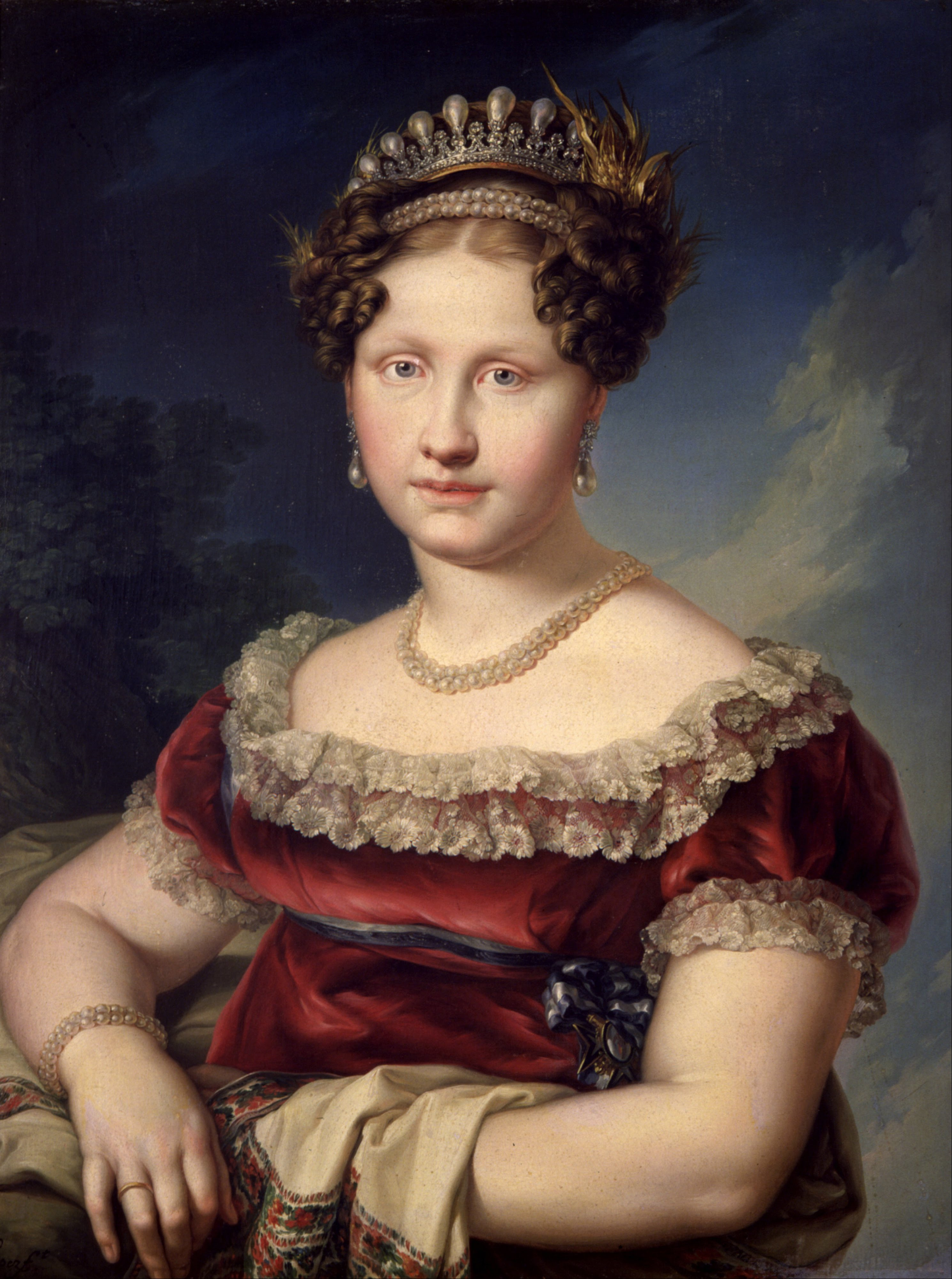
Princess Luisa Carlotta of the Two Sicilies, 1819

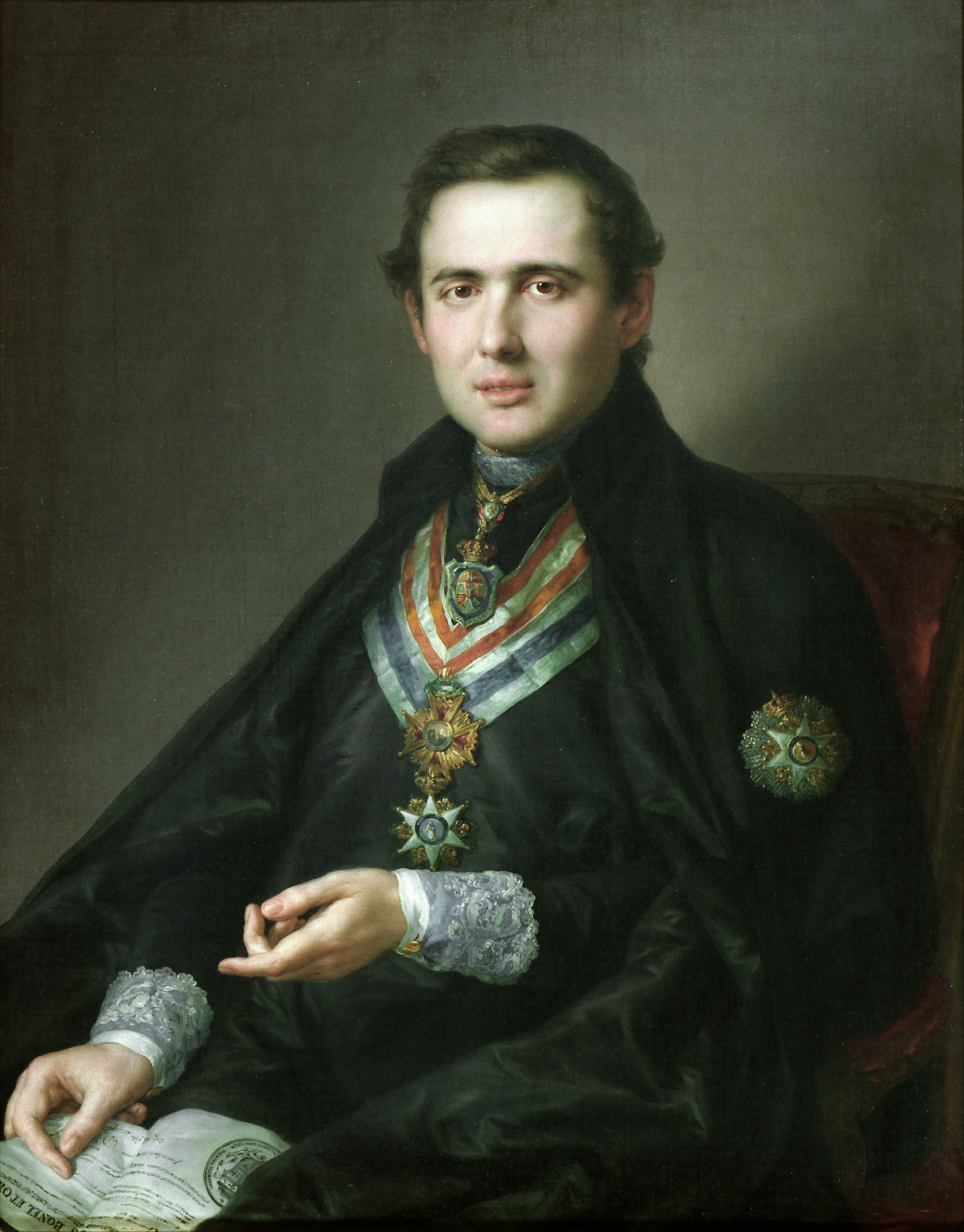
Juan Gutiérrez de León, 1840

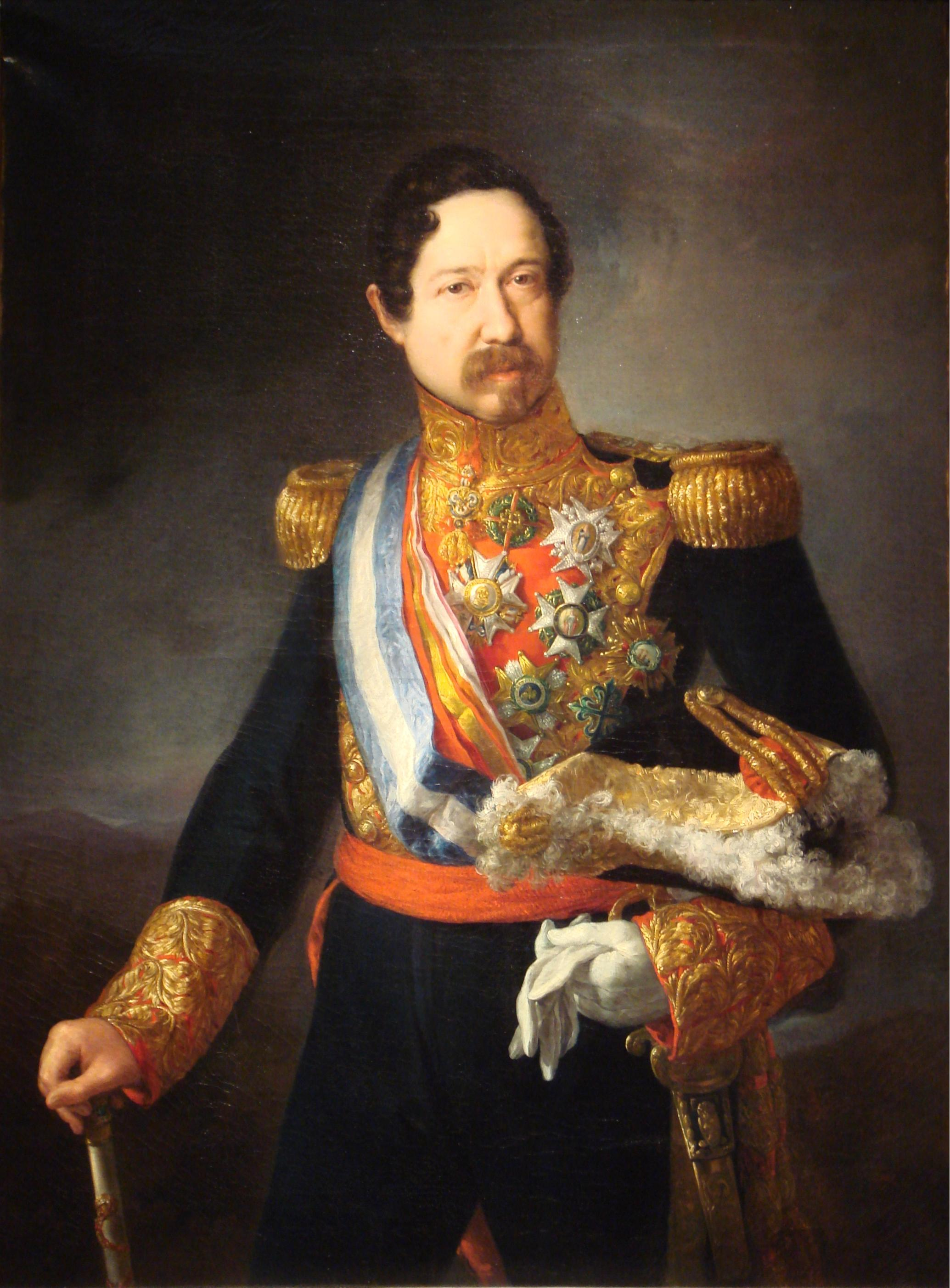
Ramón María Narváez, Duke of Valencia, 1840s

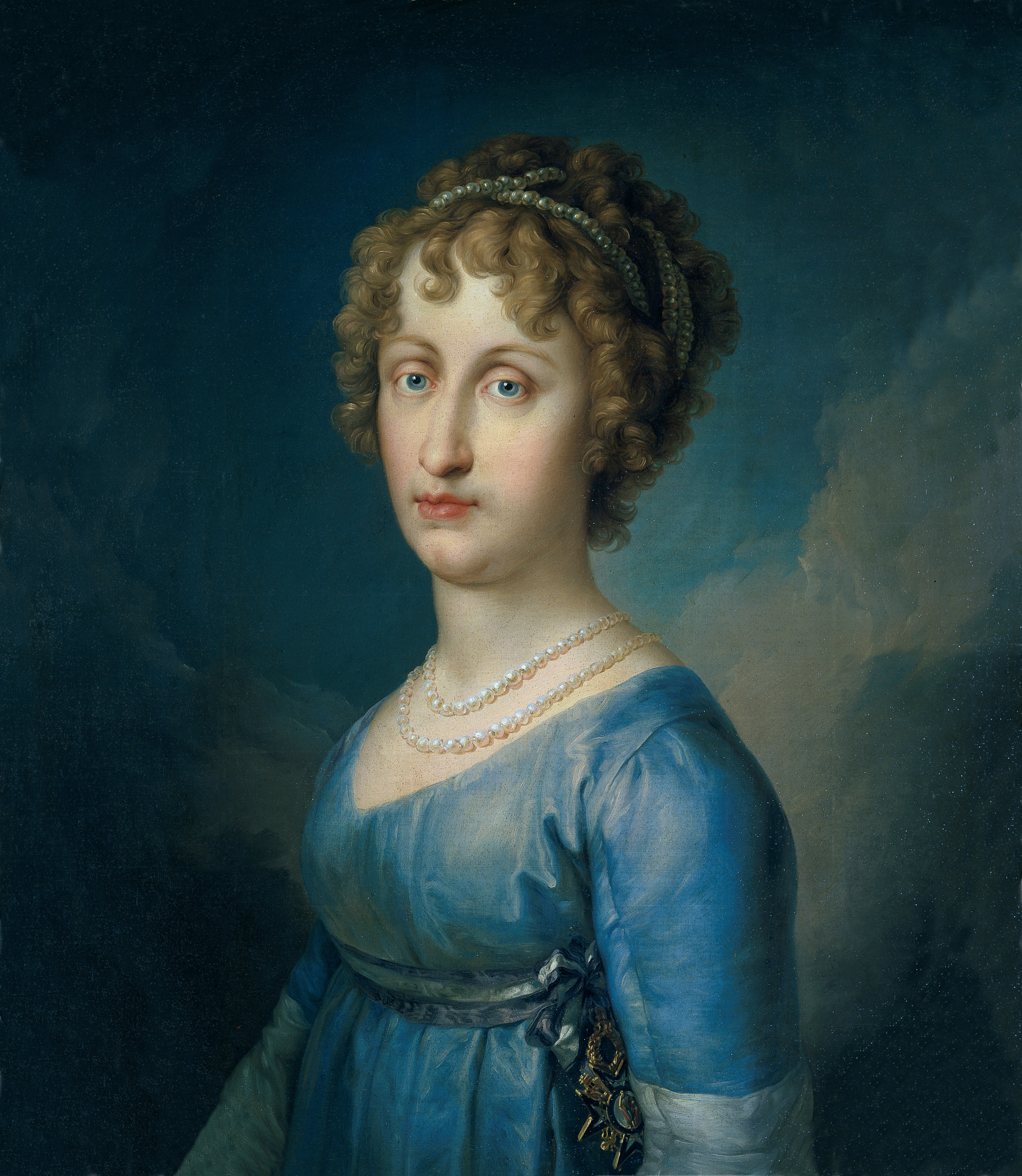
Princess Maria Antonia of Naples and Sicily, c. 1805-06

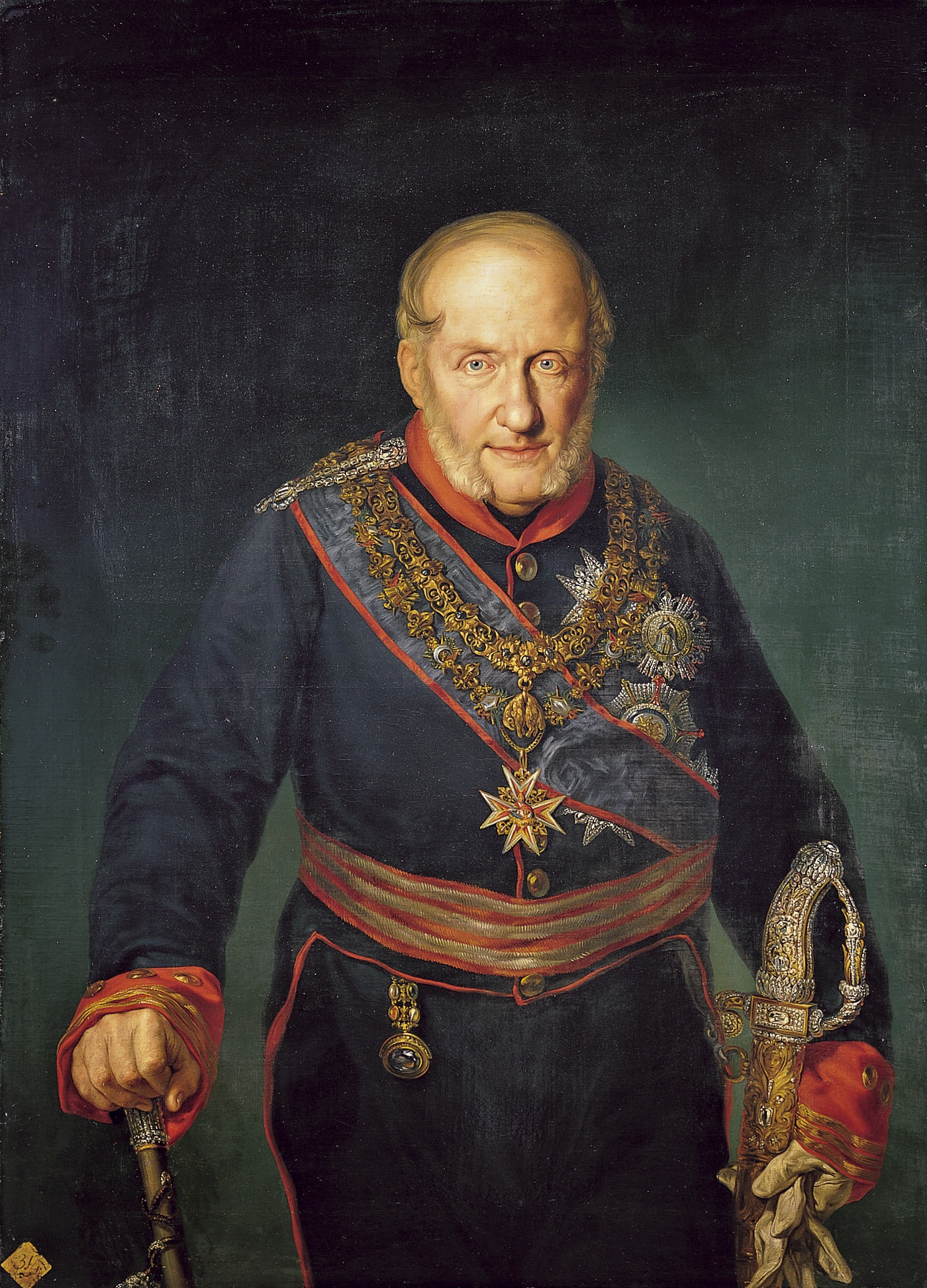
Francis I of the Two Sicilies, 1829

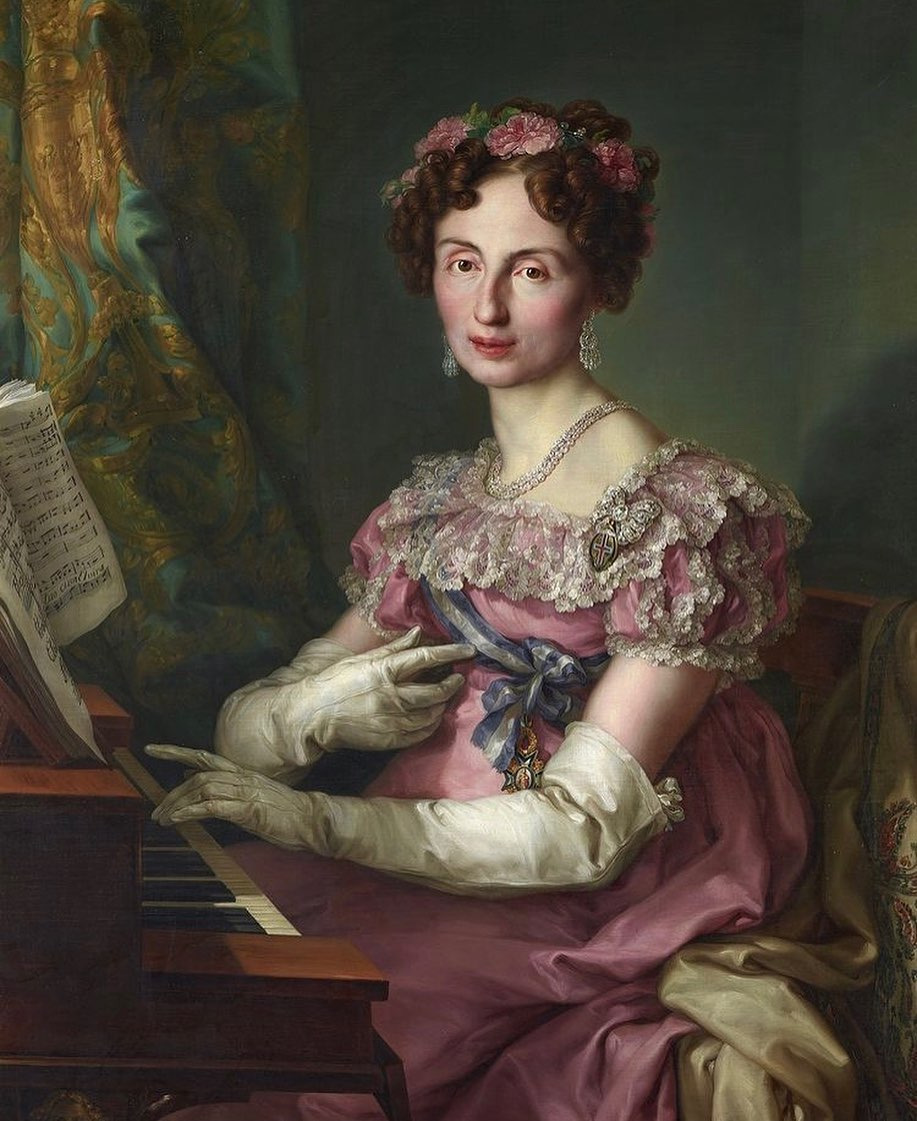
Princess Amalie of Saxony, 1825

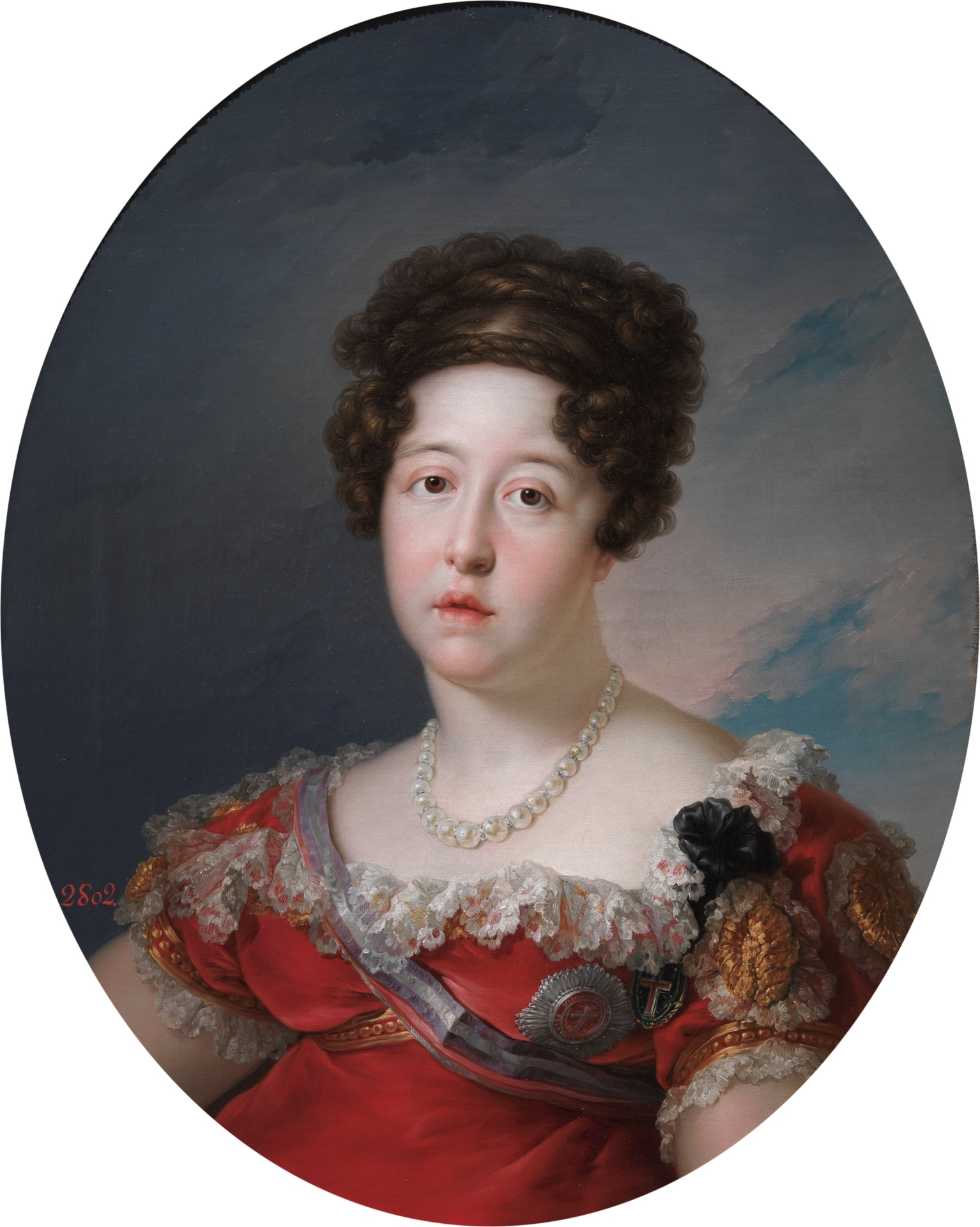
Maria Isabel of Braganza, early 19th century

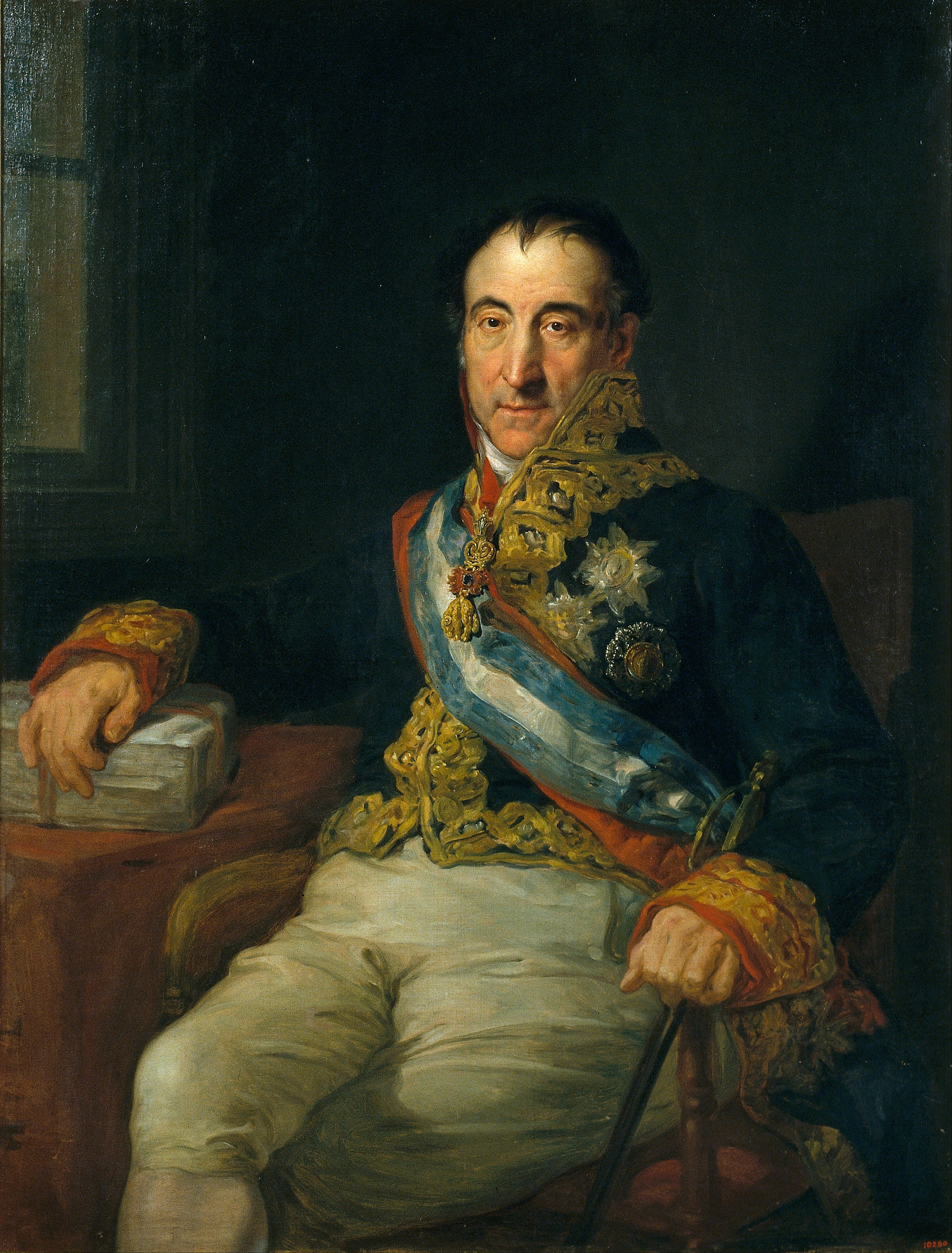
Pedro Labrador, Marquess of Labrador, c. 1833-34

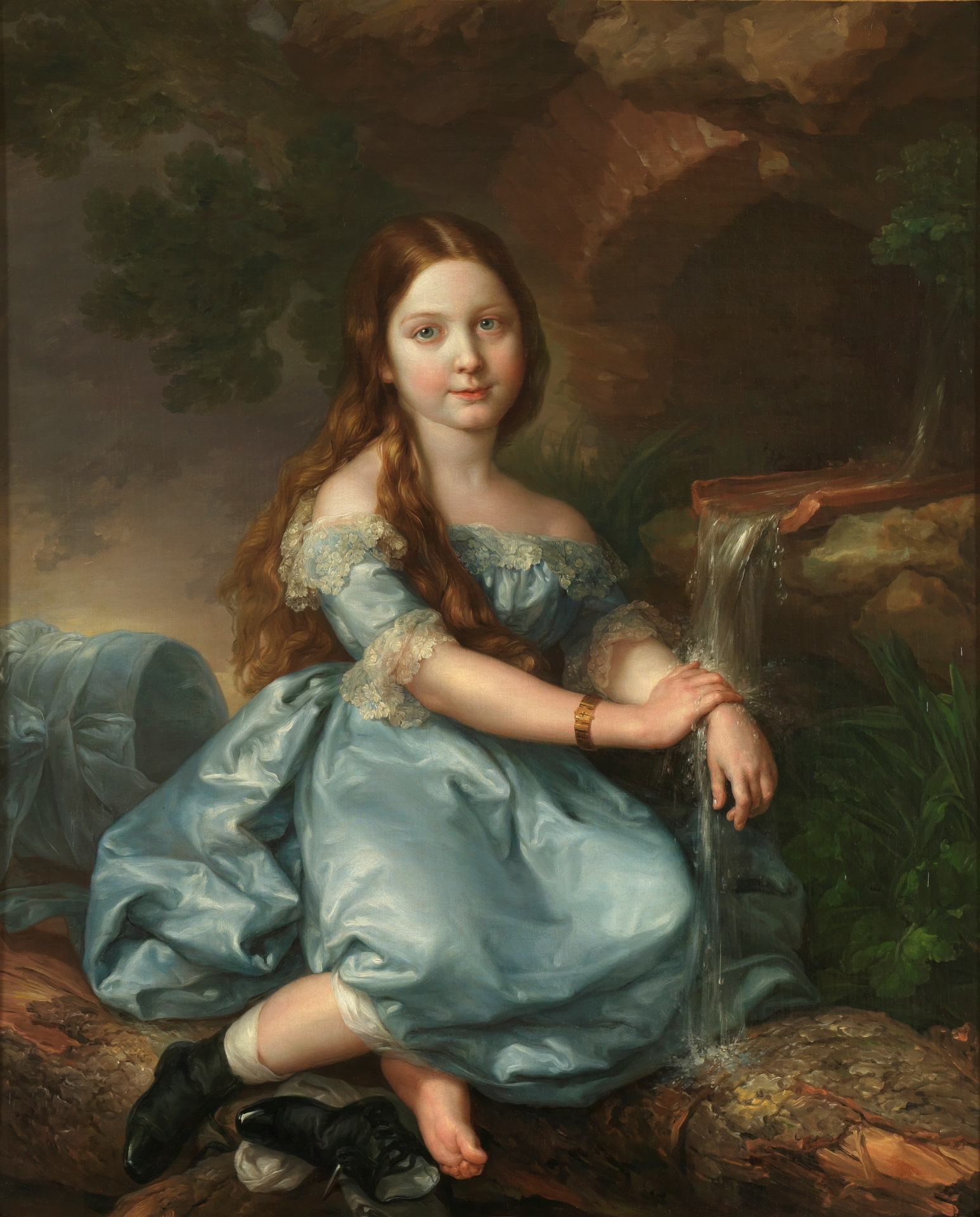
Luisa de Prat y Gandiola, 1845

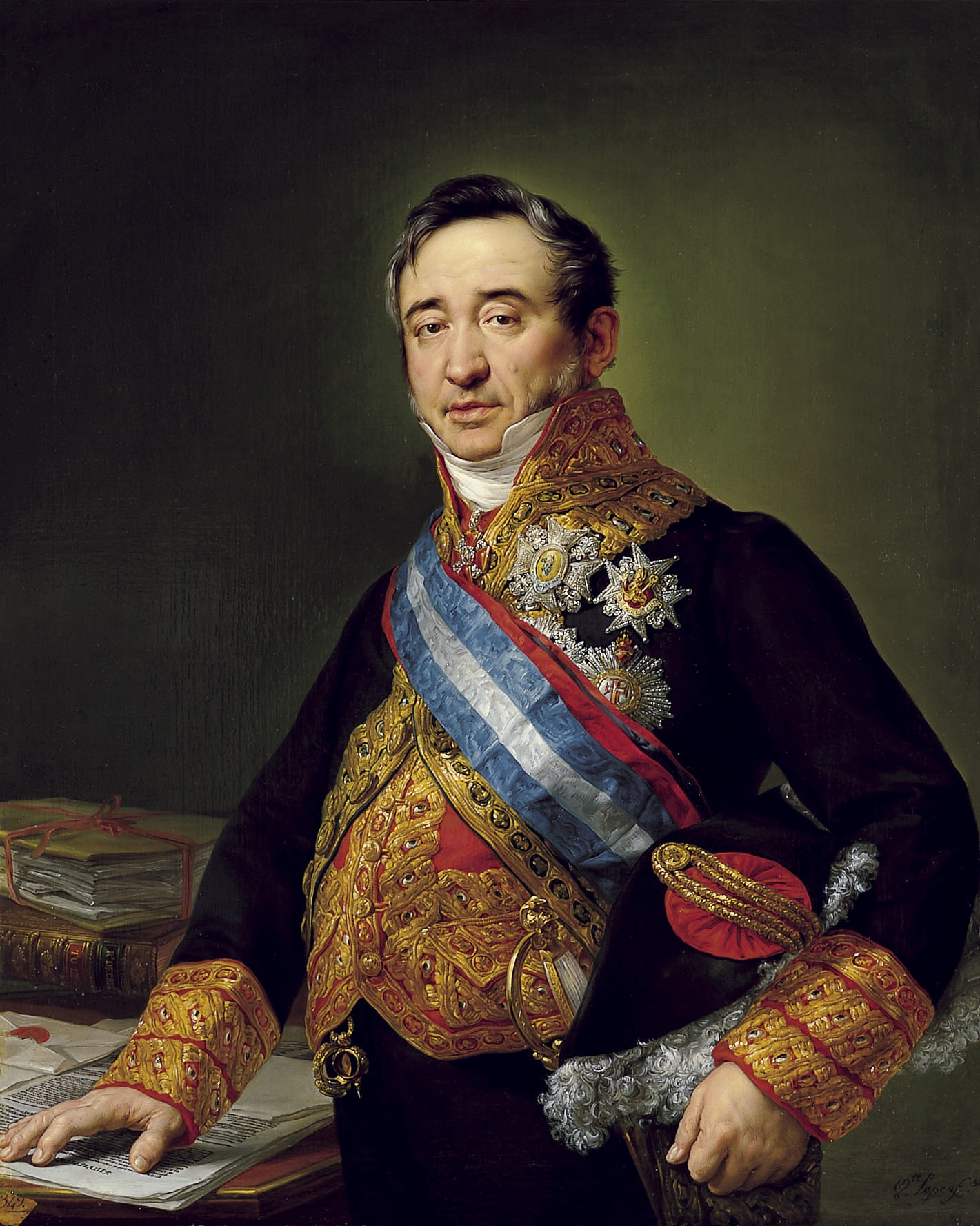
Manuel González Salmón, 1826

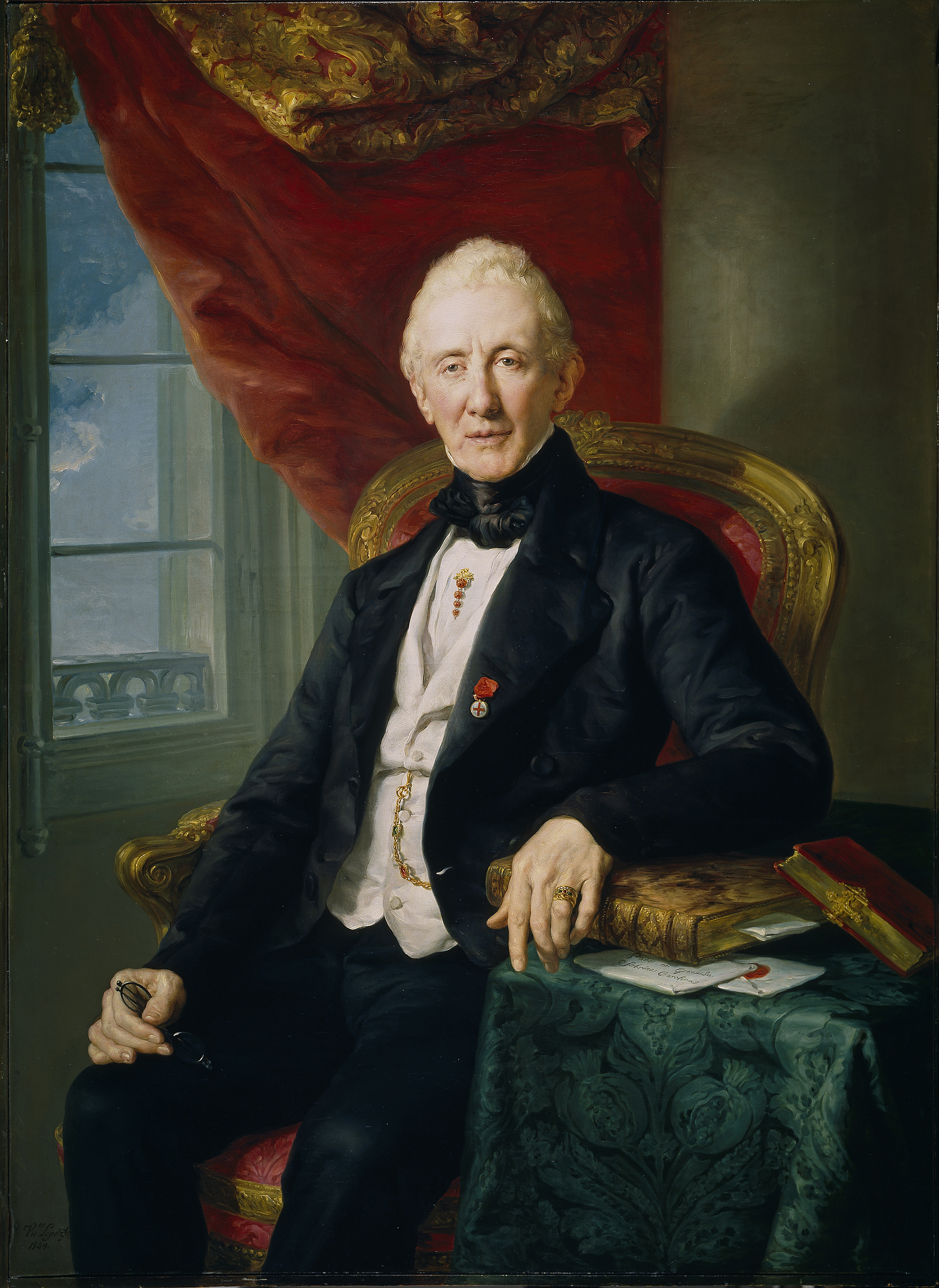
José Gutiérrez de los Ríos, 1849

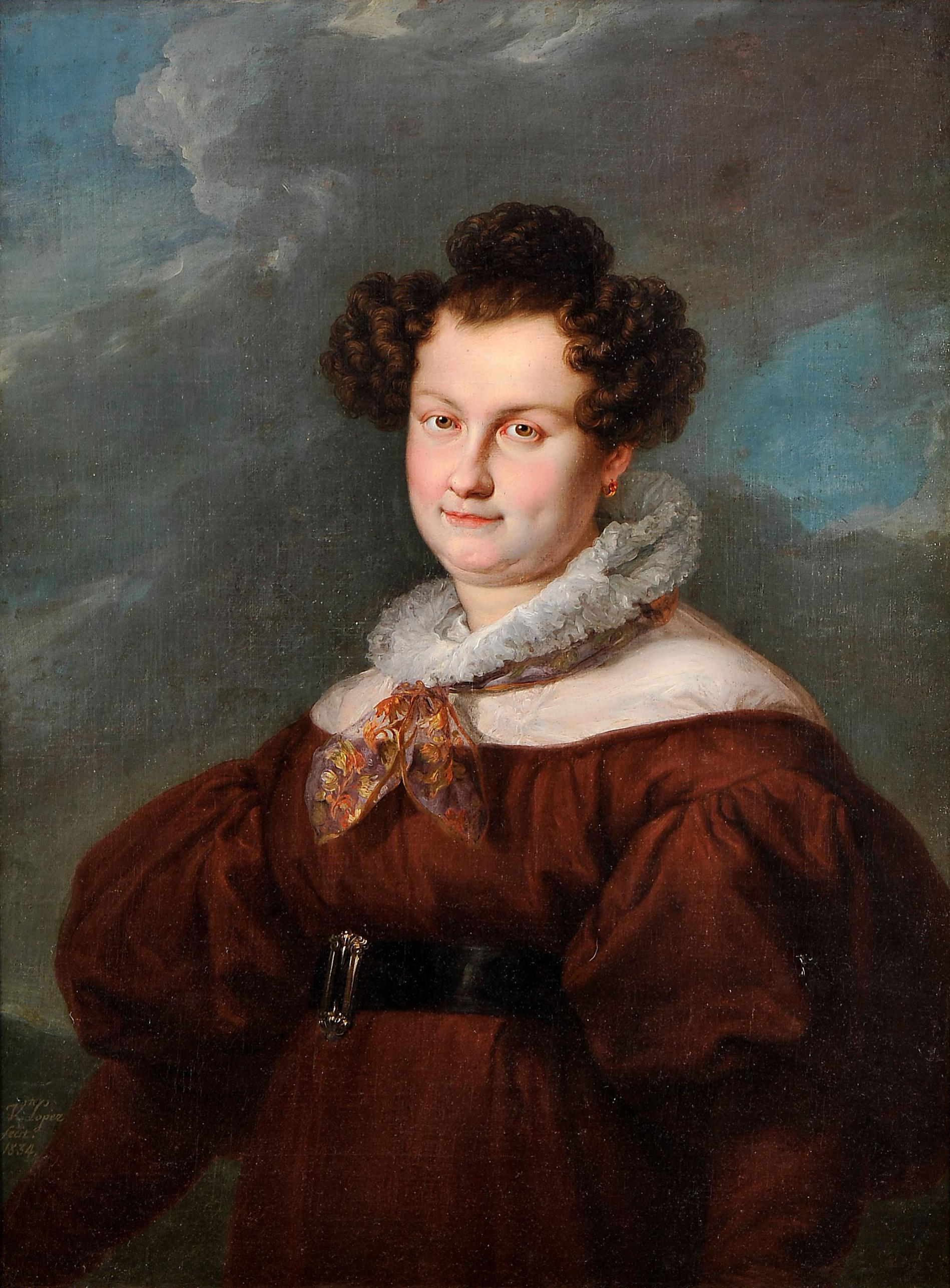
Maria Christina of the Two Sicilies, 1834

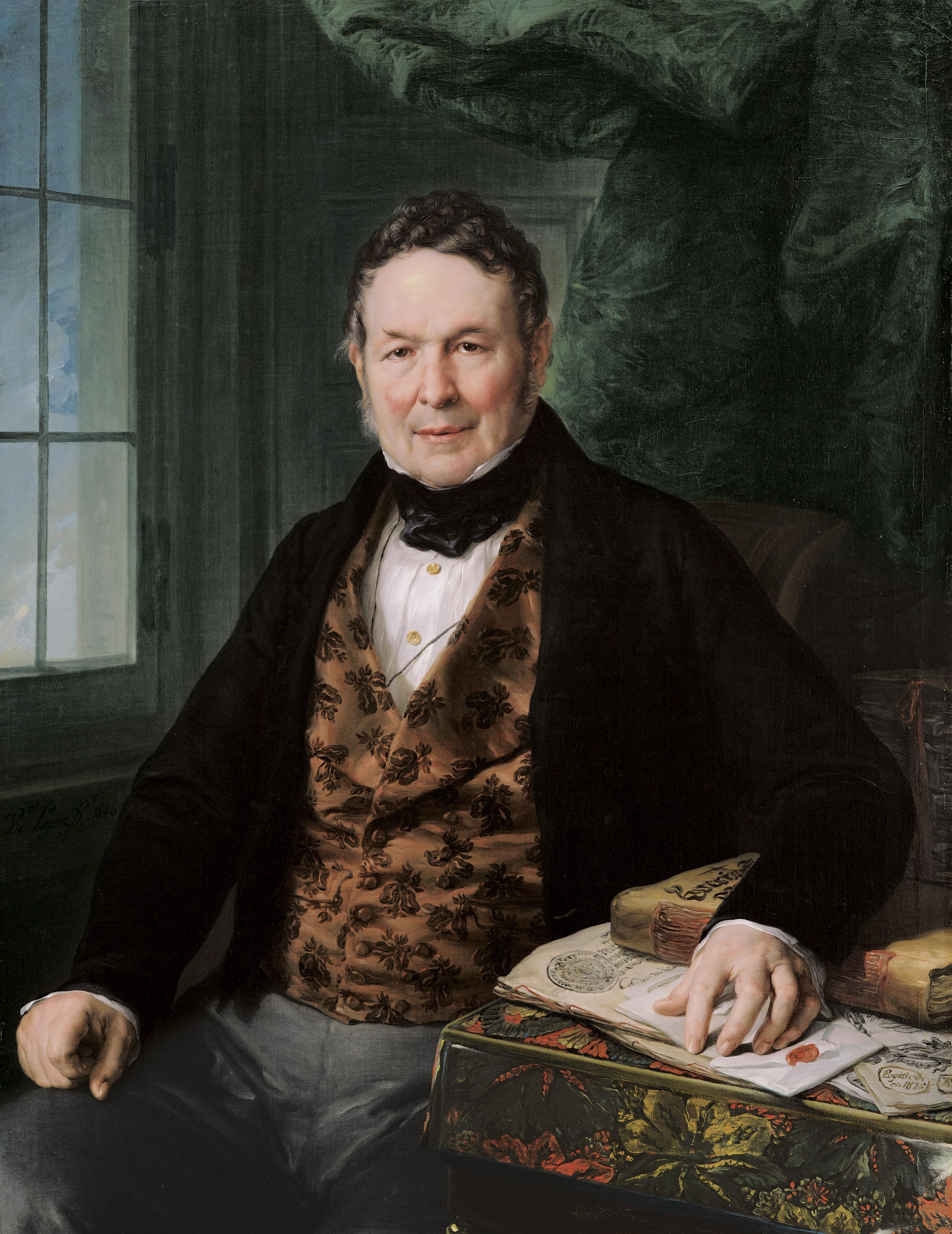
Matías Sorzano Najera, 1834

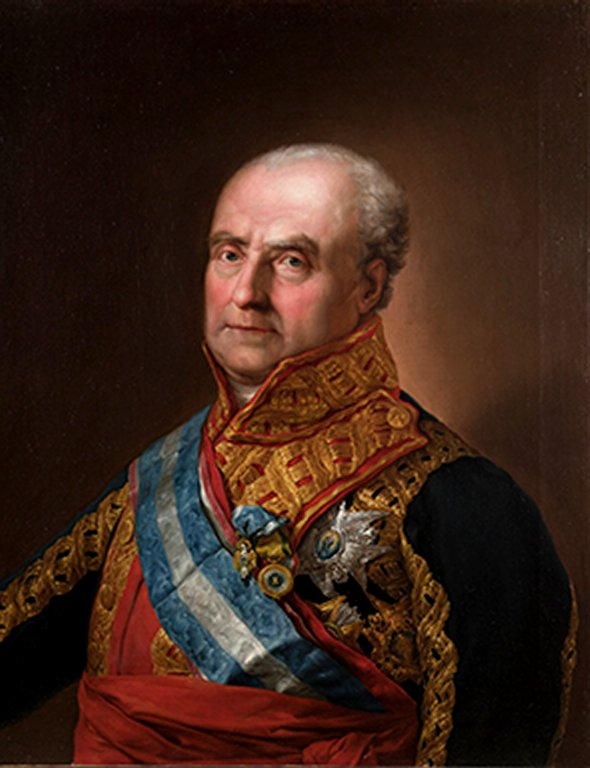
General Claude-Anne de Rouvroy, c. 1815-18
