= Luis López Piquer =

Spanish painter (1802–1865)

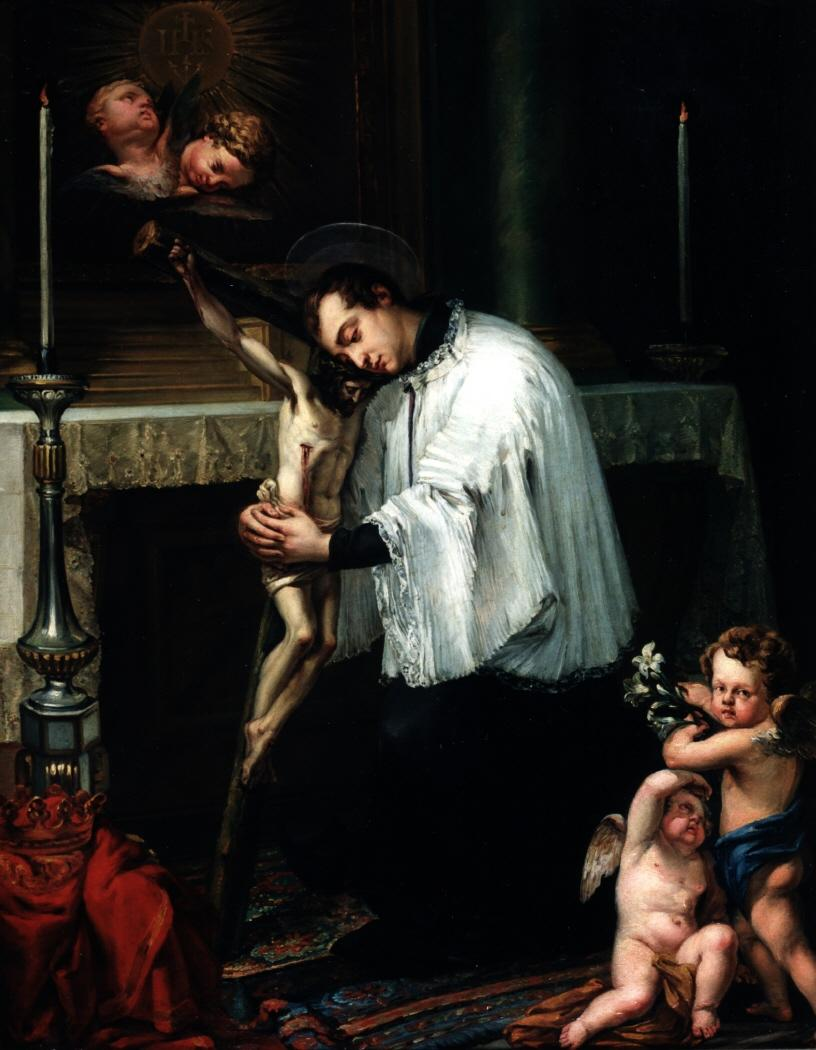
San Luis Gonzaga abrazando el Crucifijo (Saint Luis Gonzaga Hugging a Crucifix)

Luis López Piquer (21 October 1802, in Valencia – 5 June 1865, in Madrid) was a Spanish painter. He was the son of Vicente López Portaña and brother of Bernardo López Piquer, both well-known artists.

== Biography ==
Through the influence of his father, who was "Primer Pintor" at the court of King Ferdinand VII, at age nineteen he was able to present a painting (Saint Peter and the Paralytic) at the Real Academia de Bellas Artes de San Fernando. In 1825, at age twenty-three, López became a member of the Academia and was named an "Academician of Merit".

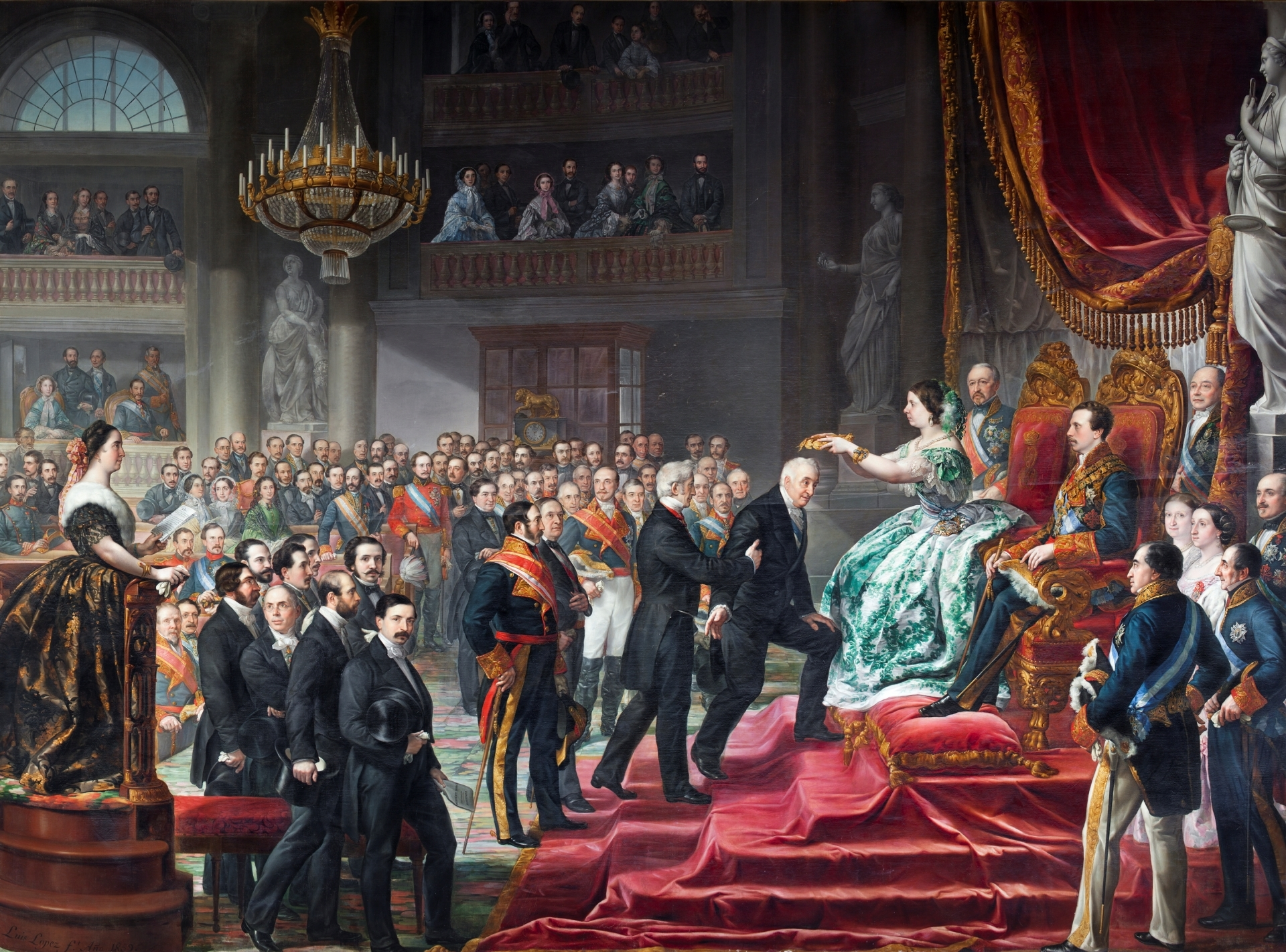
La Coronación de Quintana

Again, through parental influence, he received a commission from Queen Consort Maria Josepha to depict the Presentation of Mary (which was donated to the Church of San Antonio) and frescoes for two vaults at the Royal Palace depicting the Public Virtues and Juno in the Mansion of Dreams.

López also completed numerous religious works; notably at the church in Castromocho and, together with his brother, Bernardo, at Orihuela Cathedral.

Around 1830, he was able to study in Rome, thanks to a stipend from King Ferdinand. He had to return in 1833, when the stipend was rescinded after the king's death.

During the succession crisis that followed, López initially supported the Carlist cause. As the war turned in favor of the Liberals, he married a Frenchwoman, moved to Paris, and remained there for fourteen years.

He held his first solo exhibition at the Paris Salon of 1842. Once the Spanish political situation had stabilized, he also exhibited in Madrid. The following year, he had a showing at the Academia that included a portrait of Francis of Assisi.

In 1858, the Senate engaged López to paint La Coronación de Quintana (the poet Manuel José Quintana receiving a laurel crown), which still hangs in the Palace of the Senate and is one of his best-known works.

He was a regular participant in the National Exhibition of Fine Arts since its beginning in 1856.
