= Fernando de Borbón y Braganza =

Infante of Spain and Carlist supporter (1824–1861)

Infante Fernando
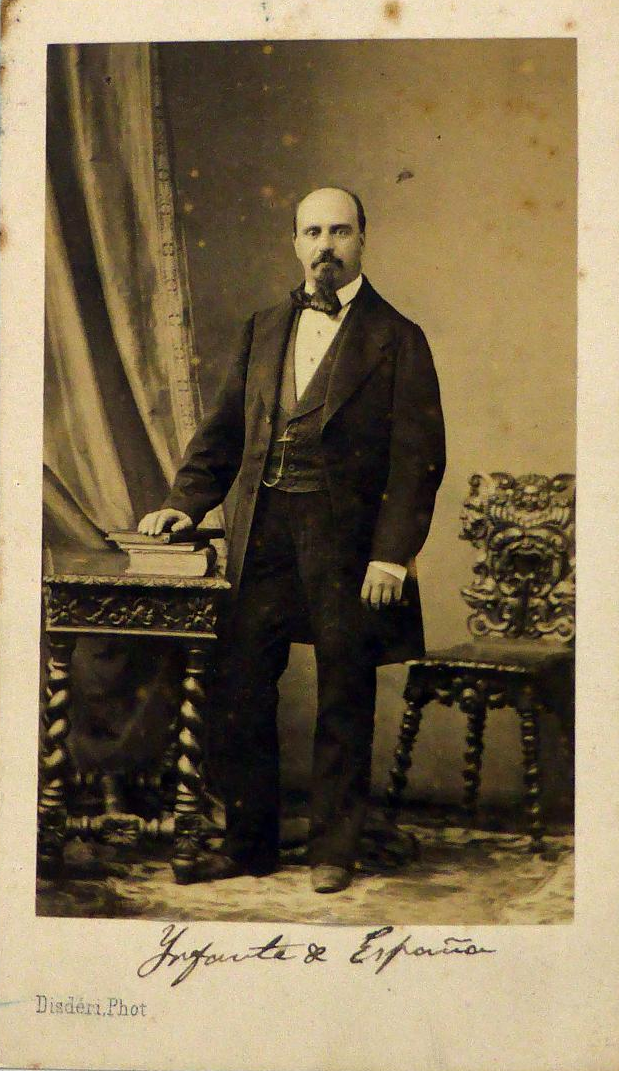
- Fernando, circa 1860
- Born: 19 October 1824; El Escorial, Madrid, Spain
- Died: 2 January 1861 (aged 36); Brunnsee
- Burial: Cathedral of St. Just, Trieste
Names
- Fernando Maria Jose
- House: House of Bourbon
- Father: Infante Carlos María Isidro of Spain
- Mother: Infanta Maria Francisca of Portugal

Don Fernando de Borbón y Braganza (full name: Fernando Maria Jose) (19 October 1824 – 2 January 1861) was a member of the Spanish royal family, and a supporter of Carlism. He lived most of his life in exile with his father and brothers.

== Biography ==
Fernando was born in El Escorial, Madrid, in 1824, during the reign of his uncle, Ferdinand VII. He was the third son of Infante Don Infante Carlos María Isidro of Spain and his first wife, Infanta Maria Francisca of Portugal. His older brothers were the Infantes Don Carlos Luis and Don Juan. His paternal grandparents were Charles IV of Spain and Maria Luisa of Parma, while his maternal grandparents were John VI of Portugal and his wife, Carlota Joaquina of Spain. He was raised in an atmosphere imbued with traditional values of loyalty to the monarchy and to the Roman Catholic Church.

== Life in court ==
When Fernando's uncle, King Ferdinand VII, was widowed for the third time in 1829, he had no legitimate issue to succeed in the event of his death. Given the King's advanced age and failing health, his brother Don Carlos, Fernando's father, was his heir presumptive and presumed successor. A clique of conservative and ultramontane supporters opposed to the King's liberalism surrounded Don Carlos at the royal court in Madrid, consolidating in opposition when the King took a fourth bride, his and Carlos's niece Maria Cristina of the Two Sicilies, by whom he fathered two daughters, the future Isabella II and Infanta Luisa Fernanda. When the king died, Don Carlos and his entourage opposed the accession to the throne of his infant niece, Isabella, whose mother nonetheless managed to obtain control as queen regent on behalf of her daughter.

== Life in exile ==
In 1833, Don Carlos was exiled to Portugal, taking his family with him, including the young Fernando. Later, in June 1834 Don Carlos moved with his family to England, where they lived at Gloucester Lodge, Old Brompton Road, and later at Alverstoke Old Rectory, Hampshire. It was in England, where a year later Fernando's mother, Infanta Maria Francisca, died. Her sons were left in the care of their father and her older sister Maria Teresa, Princess of Beira, who eventually married Don Carlos in 1838 while staying briefly with the family in Spain during the First Carlist War.

By decree of the Queen Regent, Carlos and his future descendants were legally deprived of the title infante of Spain in 1834. Thereafter, Don Fernando lived in the shadow of his father and brothers, never marrying. Faithfully supporting the cause of his father, he joined in the travails of his father following the failure of the Carlists in civil war, which imposed poverty on the family and drove them to wander Europe in their exile. They settled in the city of Trieste (in present Italy), where Don Fernando's father died in 1855.

== Death ==
In 1860, during a Carlist rising, he and his brother Infante Don Carlos Luis were taken prisoners at San Carlos de la Rápita, although later liberated. In 1861 Fernando, Carlos Luis, and the latter's wife, Carolina, died suddenly (with Fernando's death date coinciding with his paternal grandmother's), probably from typhus. The three are buried in Trieste, in the chapel of Saint Charles Borromeo in the cathedral.
