= Carlos de Borbón =

Carlos de Borbón may refer to:

- Charles III of Spain (1716–1788), King of Spain from 1759 to 1788
- Charles IV of Spain (1748–1819), King of Spain from 14 December 1788 until his abdication on 19 March 1808
- Infante Carlos María Isidro of Spain (1788–1855), Count of Molina, Carlist pretender to the Spanish throne as Carlos V
- Carlos Luis de Borbón, Count of Montemolin (1818–1861), Carlist pretender to the Spanish throne
- Prince Carlos, Duke of Madrid (1848–1909), claimant to the Spanish and French throne
- Prince Alfonso Carlos, Duke of Anjou and San Jaime (1849–1936), Carlist pretender to the Spanish throne
- Prince Carlos of Bourbon-Two Sicilies (1870–1949), nephew of Francis II of Two Sicilies, father of Infante Alfonso, Duke of Calabria
- Juan Carlos I (born 1938), King of Spain from 1975 to 2014
