= Princess Maria Carolina of the Two Sicilies (born 1820) =

Bourbon dynasty princess (b. 1820)

Princess Maria Carolina
- Countess of Montemolin
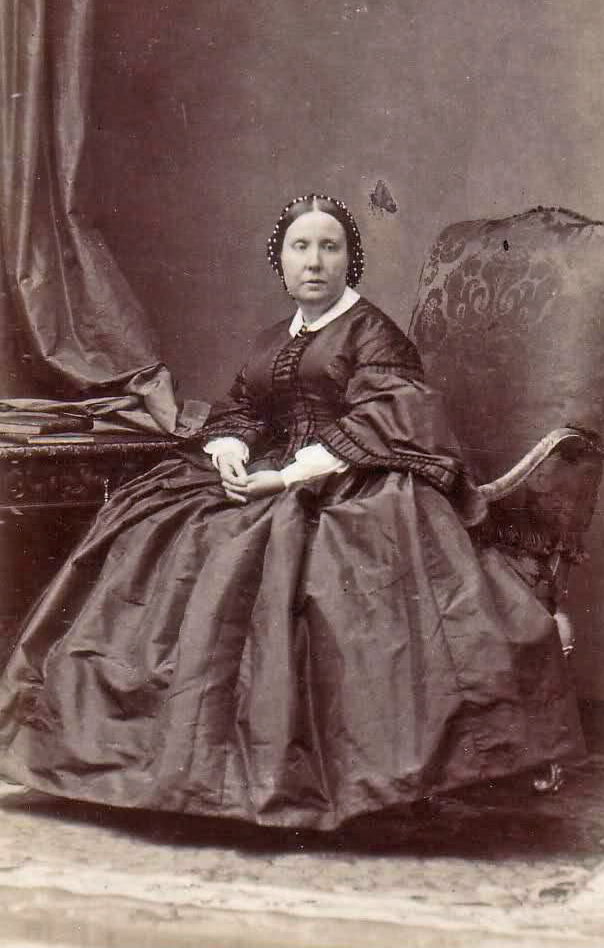
- Princess Maria Carolina, c. 1860

Consort of the Carlist pretender to the Spanish throne
- Pretence: 10 July 1850 - 13 January 1861
- Born: 29 November 1820; Naples, Two Sicilies
- Died: 14 January 1861 (aged 40); Trieste, Austrian Empire
- Burial: Cathedral of St. Just, Trieste
- Spouse: Infante Carlos, Count of Montemolin (m. 1850; died 1861)
Names
- Italian: Maria Carolina Ferdinanda
- House: Bourbon-Two Sicilies
- Father: Francis I of the Two Sicilies
- Mother: Maria Isabella of Spain

Princess Maria Carolina Ferdinanda of Bourbon-Two Sicilies (29 November 1820 – 14 January 1861) was a princess of the House of Bourbon-Two Sicilies and an infanta of Spain through her marriage to Infante Carlos, Count of Montemolin, Carlist claimant to the throne of Spain under the name Carlos VI. Maria Carolina was a daughter of Francis I of the Two Sicilies and his second wife Maria Isabella of Spain.

== Marriage and later life ==
She was considered as an early candidate for a marriage to her first cousin Prince Charles of Orléans, the fourth son of King Louis Philippe and Queen Maria Amalia but nothing ever came of these plans due to his early death.

After Infante Francisco's wife died in 1844 he wished to remarry and sent a proposal to Carolina however these plans failed as well. In the end Maria Carolina ended up marrying her first cousin, the Infante Carlos of Spain, Count of Montemolin, eldest son of Infante Carlos, Count of Molina, the carlist claimant and his wife Infanta Maria Francisca of Portugal, on 10 July 1850 at Caserta Palace in Caserta, Two Sicilies.

Maria Carolina and her husband died of typhus within a few hours of one another on 14 January 1861 in Trieste. Maria Carolina had contracted the disease from nursing her husband. The couple died without issue. Maria Carolina and Carlos were buried at the Cathedral of St. Just in Trieste.

== Ancestry ==
Ancestors of Princess Maria Carolina of the Two Sicilies (born 1820)

8. Charles III of Spain (= 12)
4. Ferdinand I of the Two Sicilies
9. Maria Amalia of Saxony (= 13)
2. Francis I of the Two Sicilies
10. Francis I, Holy Roman Emperor
5. Maria Carolina of Austria
11. Maria Theresa of Austria
1. Maria Carolina of Bourbon-Two Sicilies
12. Charles III of Spain (= 8)
6. Charles IV of Spain
13. Maria Amalia of Saxony (= 9)
3. Maria Isabella of Spain
14. Philip, Duke of Parma
7. Maria Luisa of Parma
15. Louise Élisabeth of France

Princess Maria Carolina of the Two Sicilies (born 1820) House of Bourbon-Two Sicilies Cadet branch of the House of Bourbon Born: 29 November 1820 Died: 14 January 1861
Vacant Title last held by Infanta Maria Teresa of Braganza	— TITULAR — Queen consort of Spain; 10 July 1850 - 13 January 1861	Succeeded by Maria Beatrix of Austria-Este
