= Carlos Luis de Borbón =

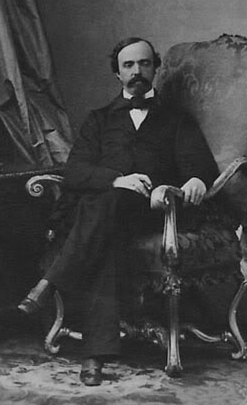

Carlist pretender to the Spanish throne
- Pretence: 18 May 1845 – 13 January 1861
- Predecessor: Carlos, Count of Molina
- Successor: Prince Juan, Count of Montizón
- Born: 31 January 1818; Madrid, Spain
- Died: 13 January 1861 (aged 42); Trieste, Austrian Empire
- Burial: Cathedral of St. Just, Trieste
- Spouse: Princess Maria Carolina of Bourbon-Two Sicilies (m. 1850)
Names
- Carlos Luis María de Borbón y Braganza
- House: House of Bourbon-Anjou
- Father: Infante Carlos María Isidro of Spain
- Mother: Infanta Maria Francisca of Portugal

Carlos Luis María de Borbón (31 January 1818 – 13 January 1861) was the Carlist claimant to the throne of Spain under the name Carlos VI after his father's renunciation in 1845. He used the title Conde de Montemolín (Count of Montemolín).

== Biography ==
Carlos Luis was born at the Royal Palace of Madrid, the elder son of Infante Carlos María Isidro of Spain and of his first wife, Infanta Maria Francisca of Portugal. His godparents were his uncle and aunt Ferdinand VII of Spain and his second wife Maria Isabel of Braganza. Carlos Luis spent his youth in exile in Portugal and Great Britain. During the First Carlist War, he accompanied his father on the northern front. At the end of the war, both settled in France.

When his father renounced his succession rights on 18 May 1845, Carlos Luis became the Carlist claimant. An attempt was made to arrange a marriage between him and his first cousin Isabella II of Spain which would end the Carlist conflict. In these negotiations Carlos insisted that he be recognised as full king and not merely as king consort as suggested by Jaime Balmes. In October 1846 Isabella married another cousin Francisco de Asís, Duke of Cádiz.

In December 1846, Carlos Luis published a manifesto in which he called for armed struggle. He settled in London and shortly after the Second Carlist War (1847–49) began. In April 1847 he tried to enter Spain, but was stopped at the French border and returned to London. The Minister Plenipotentiary of the United States in Madrid, through Antonio de Arjona and José María de Areizaga, informed Carlos Luis that the United States government would provide financial support for his restoration on condition that he agree to handing over the island of Cuba to the United States when restored. Carlos Luis replied that he preferred to always live in exile rather than attack the integrity of Spain.

He was briefly engaged in 1848 to Adeline de Horsey before marrying on 10 July 1850, his first cousin Princess Maria Carolina of the Two Sicilies, fifth daughter of Francis I of the Two Sicilies and his second wife Maria Isabella of Spain. They had no children.

In 1855, Carlos Luis maintained contacts with his cousin Francisco de Asís to reach a reconciliation between the two Bourbon branches. This failed and in May a small Carlist insurrection took place in Spain.

In March 1860, Carlos Luis went to the Balearic Islands to lead another insurrection with the support of the captain general of the Balearic Islands, Jaime Ortega y Olleta. On 1 April, with a force of 4000 men, they landed on the Catalan coast at Sant Carles de la Ràpita. After disembarking, they marched to Amposta to spend the night, but as they continued, the troops revolted, mistrusting the intentions of their commanders. Carlos Luis and the other leaders of the insurrection had to flee to Ulldecona.

On 21 April, the army of Isabella II arrested Carlos Luis and his brother Fernando and took them to Tortosa. There, Carlos and Fernando were forced to sign renunciations.

Carlos Luis and Fernando were released by Isabella's government. They went to Trieste. On 15 June they issued a statement declared their forced renunciations null. In spite of this, Carlos Luis' other brother and heir-presumptive Juan recognised the renunciations as valid and declared himself to be Carlist claimant to the throne.

In January 1861, within a space of less than two weeks, Carlos Luis, his wife Carolina, and his brother Fernando died, probably from typhus. The three are buried in the chapel of Saint Charles Borromeo in Trieste Cathedral. At Carlos' death, his brother Juan became the undisputed Carlist claimant to the Spanish throne.

== Ancestry ==
Ancestors of Carlos Luis de Borbón

8. Charles III of Spain
4. Charles IV of Spain
9. Maria Amalia of Saxony
2. Infante Carlos María Isidro of Spain
10. Philip, Duke of Parma
5. Maria Luisa of Parma
11. Louise-Élisabeth of France
1. Carlos Luis María de Borbón
12. Peter III of Portugal
6. John VI of Portugal
13. Maria I of Portugal
3. Infanta Maria Francisca of Portugal
14. Charles IV of Spain (= 4)
7. Carlota Joaquina of Spain
15. Maria Luisa of Parma (= 5)

== Notes ==
Carlos Luis de Borbón House of Bourbon Born: 31 January 1818 Died: 13 January 1861
Titles in pretence
Preceded by Infante Carlos María Isidro of Spain	— TITULAR — King of Spain; Carlist Pretender; 1845–1861	Succeeded by Prince Juan, Count of Montizón
