= The Countess of Chinchon =

Painting by Francisco Goya

- La Condesa de Chinchón (Spanish)
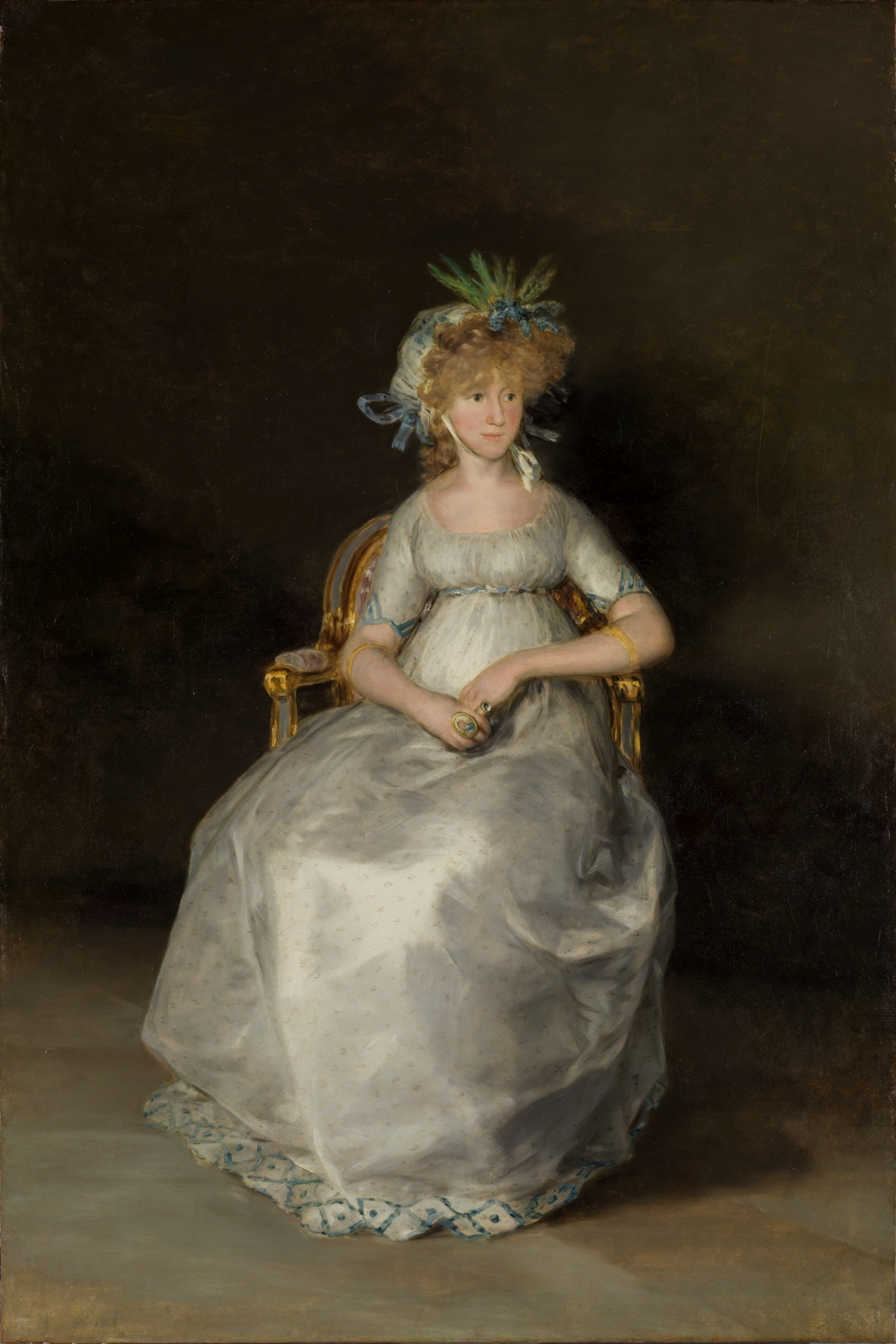
- Artist: Francisco Goya
- Year: c. 1800
- Medium: Oil on canvas
- Dimensions: 216 cm × 144 cm (85 in × 57 in)
- Location: Museo del Prado; Madrid

The Countess of Chinchon (Spanish: Condesa de Chinchón) is an oil-on-canvas portrait painted by the Spanish artist Francisco Goya, c. 1800. It is held in the Museo del Prado, Madrid. The painting depicts María Teresa de Borbón, 15th Countess of Chinchón, who had been encouraged by Queen Maria Luisa of Parma and by opportunism to marry Manuel de Godoy, the Prime Minister, in a marriage of convenience. It does not depict the more famous Countess of Chinchón who became the namesake of the cinchona genus of trees and shrubs responsible for early modern quinine production.

== Countess of Chinchón ==
Maria Teresa of Bourbon y Vallabriga, Countess of Chinchón and Marquis de Boadilla del Monte (1780–1828), was the eldest daughter of the morganatic marriage of Infant Louis Antoni Bourbon and Maria Teresa de Vallabriga y Rozas, daughter of a cavalry officer. The result of this union was the expulsion of the infant from the court by King Charles III, his brother.

The infant died when Maria Teresa was only five years old. She was then taken from her mother and brought up, together with her younger sister, in a monastery in Toledo. She left the monastery at the age of seventeen, when the new royal couple, Charles IV and Maria Ludwika of Bourbon-Parma, decided to marry her to the most influential man in court, the royal favorite Manuel Godoy.

Thanks to the queen’s protection, Godoy’s career progressed rapidly from a colonel in the royal guard to the first minister who exercised effective power in the state. The queen, who may have had an affair with Godoy, wanted to distract the favorite from his longtime mistress, Pepita Tudó.

For Godoy, marrying the king’s cousin was a distinction and social promotion, as he officially became a member of the royal family. The countess regained numerous privileges lost as a result of her father’s exile, such as the use of the name and coat of arms of the Bourbons. She became the most important lady in the country after Queen Maria Ludwika.

== The circumstances of the uprising ==
The countess' parents were patrons of the arts; they gathered many talented painters, writers and musicians. For Goya they were the first patrons, their recognition of the painter's work significantly influenced his career as a portrait painter. In the years 1783–1784, as a guest of the infanta at Arenas de San Pedro, Goya performed many works for them; including a collective portrait, "The family of Infant don Luis", in which the countess is a girl watching the painter's work. Goya also portrayed a few-year-old Maria Teresa in a stylish little lady outfit and probably also on the occasion of her wedding.

== See also ==
- List of works by Francisco Goya
- Count of Chinchón
