= Infanta Maria Francisca of Portugal =

Portuguese infanta (1800–1834)

- Countess of Molina
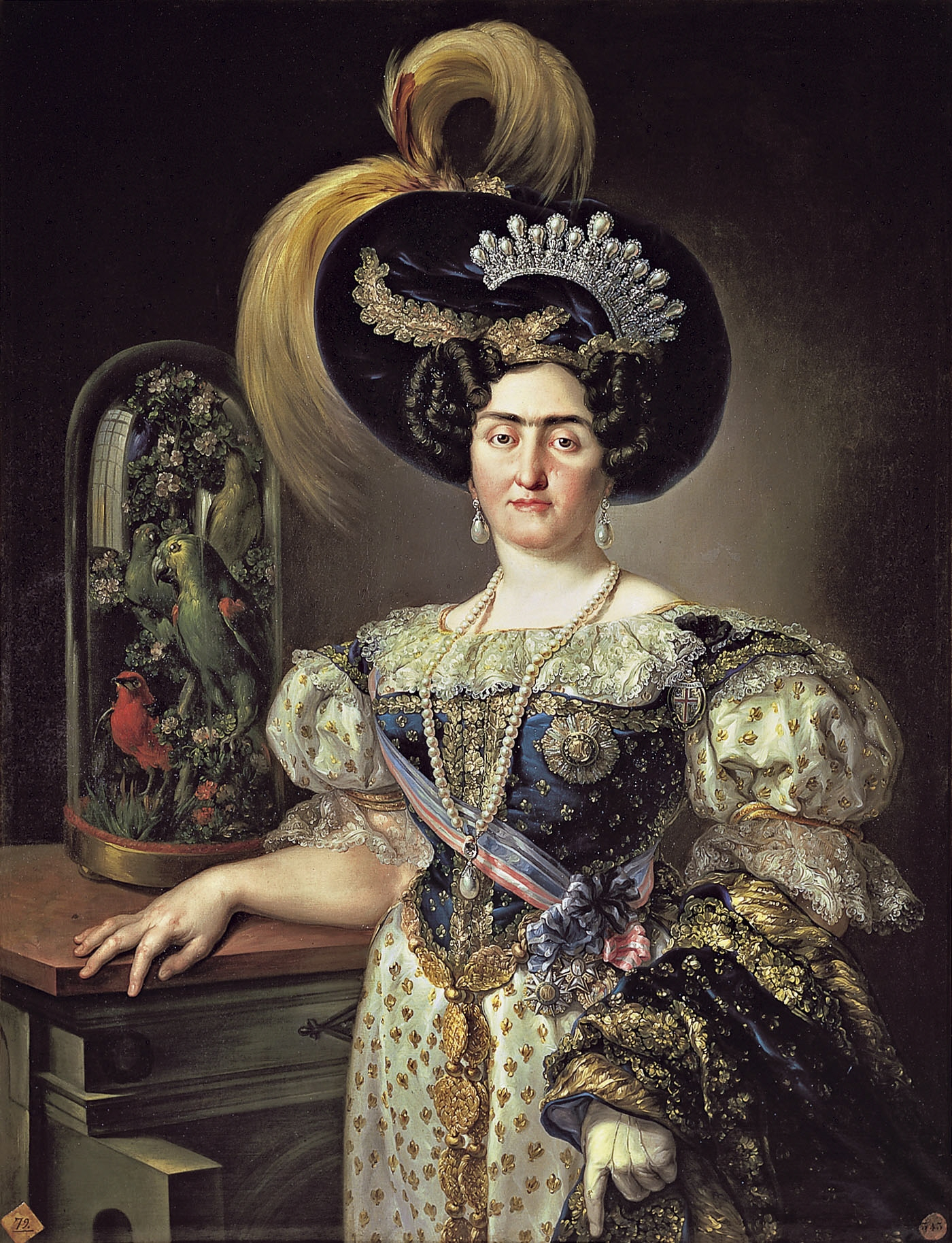
- Portrait, 1823

Consort of the Carlist pretender to the Spanish throne
- Pretence: 29 September 1833 – 4 September 1834
- Born: 22 April 1800 (Note: Born at 7:00 AM in the Palace of Queluz, as recorded in the official baptismal records of the Portuguese Royal Chapel.) (Note: Her godparents were her maternal grandparents.) (Note: She was officially baptized on 26 April 1800 at the Royal Chapel of the Queluz National Palace.); Queluz Palace, Kingdom of Portugal
- Died: 4 September 1834 (aged 34); Alverstoke, Hampshire, United Kingdom
- Burial: Trieste Cathedral, Italy
- Spouse: Infante Carlos, Count of Molina (m. 1816)
- Issue: Infante Carlos, Count of Montemolin; Infante Juan, Count of Montizón; Infante Fernando
Names
- Maria Francisca de Assis da Maternidade Xavier de Paula e de Alcântara Antónia Joaquina Gonzaga Carlota Mónica Senhorinha Sotera e Caia de Bourbon e Bragança
- House: House of Braganza
- Father: John VI of Portugal
- Mother: Carlota Joaquina of Spain

Infanta Maria Francisca of Braganza (Portuguese pronunciation: [mɐˈɾiɐ fɾɐ̃ˈsiʃkɐ]; 22 April 1800 – 4 September 1834) was a Portuguese infanta, the daughter of King John VI of Portugal and his consort Carlota Joaquina of Spain.

== Early life ==
Born at the Queluz National Palace on 22 April 1800, Maria Francisca's childhood coincided with the peak of the Napoleonic Wars in the Iberian Peninsula. In 1807, at the age of seven, she joined the royal family in their historic flight to Rio de Janeiro to escape the invading French forces under General Junot.

She spent nearly a decade in South America, receiving a rigorous education centered on Catholic piety, classical languages, and courtly diplomacy within the tropical setting of the São Cristóvão Palace. This formative period ensured she remained a key figure in future Iberian dynastic alliances upon the court's eventual return to Europe.

== Marriage ==
In a strategic effort to solidify ties between the Portuguese and Spanish thrones during the post-Napoleonic restoration, Maria Francisca married her maternal uncle, Infante Carlos, Count of Molina, on 22 September 1816 in Madrid. This union was part of a prestigious double-marriage arrangement designed by her mother, Queen Carlota Joaquina; her sister, Maria Isabel of Portugal, was wed to King Ferdinand VII of Spain during the same lavish ceremony.

The marriage produced three sons, who would later become the standard-bearers of the Carlist cause:

- Infante Carlos, Count of Montemolin (1818–1861) married Princess Maria Carolina of the Two Sicilies
- Juan, Count of Montizón (1822–1887) married Archduchess Maria Beatrix of Austria-Este
- Infante Fernando died unmarried

== Conflict and British exile ==
Following the death of Ferdinand VII in 1833, Maria Francisca emerged as a staunch defender of her husband's claim to the Spanish throne against that of her niece, Isabella II of Spain. Refusing to acknowledge the suspension of Salic law via the Pragmatic Sanction, the family was compelled into exile as the First Carlist War erupted.

They initially sought refuge in Portugal under the protection of Miguel I of Portugal, before settling in Alverstoke, Hampshire, in the United Kingdom in June 1834. Her health, already fragile from years of political stress and the hardships of travel, deteriorated rapidly during their time in England.

== Death and legacy ==
Maria Francisca died on 4 September 1834 at the age of 34, likely from a combination of exhaustion and pulmonary illness. Her funeral at St Mary's in Gosport drew thousands of mourners, reflecting the deep local sympathy for the exiled infanta.

Though initially buried in England, her remains were eventually moved to Trieste Cathedral in Italy (San Giusto), where they rest among other members of the Carlist line in the Chapel of San Carlo Borromeo. Four years after her passing, her husband married her elder sister, Maria Teresa, Princess of Beira, who continued her legacy within the Carlist movement.

== Ancestry ==
Ancestors of Infanta Maria Francisca of Portugal

8. João V of Portugal
4. Pedro III of Portugal
9. Maria Anna of Austria
2. João VI of Portugal and Brazil
10. José I of Portugal
5. Maria I of Portugal and Brazil
11. Mariana Victoria of Spain
1. Infanta Maria Francisca
12. Charles III of Spain
6. Charles IV of Spain
13. Maria Amalia of Saxony
3. Carlota Joaquina of Spain
14. Philip, Duke of Parma
7. Maria Luisa of Parma
15. Louise Élisabeth of France

== Bibliography ==
=== Primary sources and Contemporary records ===
- Almanach de Gotha: Annuaire généalogique, diplomatique et statistique (in French). Gotha: Justus Perthes. 1834.
- Lodge, Edmund (1832). The Genealogy of the Existing British Peerage: With Sketches of the Family Histories of the Nobility. London: Saunders and Otley.
- Pirala, Antonio (1868). Historia de la guerra civil, và của vương triều Carlist (in Spanish). Madrid: F. de P. Mellado.

=== Secondary sources and Academic studies ===
- Aronson, Theo (1966). Royal Vendetta: The Crown of Spain 1829–1965. Bobbs-Merrill. ISBN 978-0672503511.
- Beattie, Andrew (2003). The Danube: A Cultural History. Oxford University Press. ISBN 978-0195188356.
- Birmingham, David (2003). A Concise History of Portugal. Cambridge University Press. ISBN 978-0521536868.
- Blinkhorn, Martin (1975). Carlism and Crisis in Spain 1931–1939. Cambridge University Press. ISBN 978-0521207294.
- Carr, Raymond (1982). Spain, 1808–1975. Clarendon Press. ISBN 978-0198221234.
- Cheke, Marcus (1947). Carlota Joaquina, Queen of Portugal. London: Sidgwick & Jackson.
- Coverdale, John F. (1984). The Basque Phase of the First Carlist War. Princeton University Press. ISBN 978-0691054117.
- Lynch, John (1989). Bourbon Spain 1700–1833. Blackwell. ISBN 978-0631145769.
- Maxwell, Kenneth (2003). Naked Tropics: Essays on Empire and Other Rogues. Routledge. ISBN 978-0415945769.
- Paquette, Gabriel (2013). Imperial Portugal in the Age of Atlantic Revolutions. Cambridge University Press. ISBN 978-1107028975.
- Schultz, Kirsten (2001). Tropical Versailles: Empire, Monarchy, and the Portuguese Royal Court in Rio de Janeiro. Routledge. ISBN 978-0415929882.
- Wilcken, Patrick (2004). Empire Adrift: The Portuguese Court in Rio de Janeiro. Bloomsbury. ISBN 978-1582344775.

Infanta Maria Francisca of Portugal House of Braganza Cadet branch of the House of Aviz Born: 22 April 1800 Died: 4 September 1834
Titles in pretence
Preceded by Maria Christina of the Two Sicilies	— TITULAR — Queen consort of Spain; 29 September 1833 – 4 September 1834	Vacant Title next held by Infanta Maria Teresa of Braganza
