= Prince Juan, Count of Montizón =

Juan de Borbón
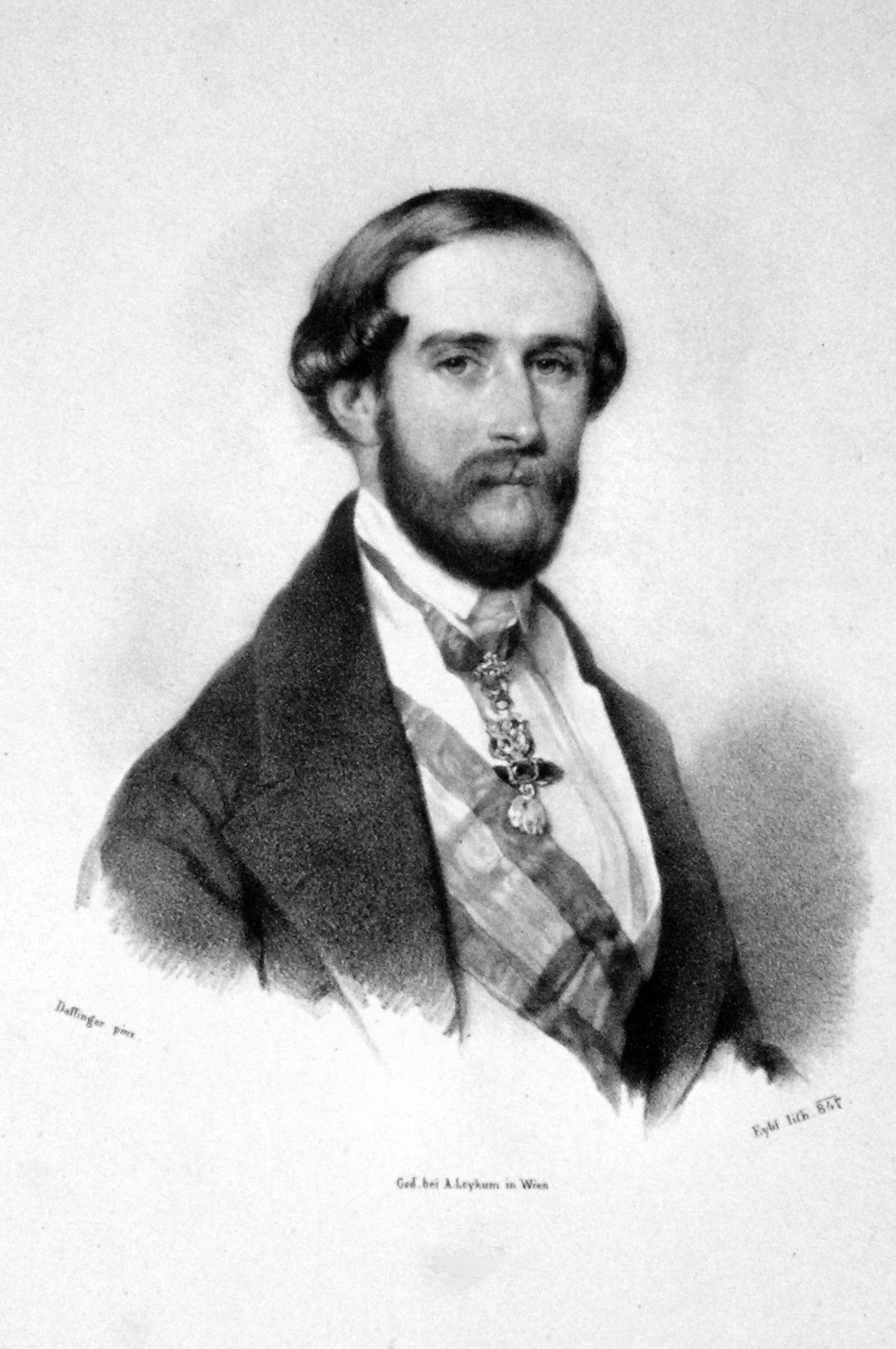
- Juan in 1847

Carlist pretender to the Spanish throne
- Pretence: 13 January 1861 – 3 October 1868
- Predecessor: Infante Carlos, Count of Montemolin
- Successor: Prince Carlos, Duke of Madrid

Legitimist claimant to the French throne
- Pretence: 24 August 1883 – 18 November 1887
- Predecessor: Prince Henri, Count of Chambord
- Successor: Prince Carlos, Duke of Madrid
- Born: 15 May 1822
- Died: 18 November 1887 (aged 65)
- Spouse: Maria Beatrix of Austria-Este (m. 1847)
- Issue: Prince Carlos, Duke of Madrid; Prince Alfonso Carlos, Duke of Anjou and San Jaime; Helen Monfort; John Monfort
Names
- Don Juan Carlos María Isidro de Borbón y Braganza
- House: Bourbon
- Father: Infante Carlos María Isidro of Spain
- Mother: Infanta Maria Francisca of Portugal

Don Juan Carlos María Isidro de Borbón (15 May 1822 – 18 November 1887) was the Carlist claimant to the throne of Spain from 1860 to 1868, holder of the Legitimist claim to the throne of France from 1883 to 1887, and was a possible candidate to the Mexican throne before the establishment of the Second Mexican Empire in the 1860s.

== Early life ==
Juan was born at the Palacio Real de Aranjuez in the province of Madrid, the younger son of the Infante Carlos María Isidro of Spain, brother of King Ferdinand VII, and his first wife, Infanta Maria Francisca of Portugal. He was raised in an atmosphere imbued with traditional values of loyalty to the monarchy and the Church.

In March 1833 Juan moved with his family to Portugal. The following September Juan's uncle Ferdinand VII died, and Juan's father Carlos claimed the throne of Spain as King Carlos V. Carlos opposed the succession of his infant niece Queen Isabella II whose mother the Queen Regent Maria Christina managed to take control on behalf of her daughter. In June 1834 Juan moved with his family to England, where they lived at Gloucester Lodge, Old Brompton Road, and later at Alverstoke Old Rectory, Hampshire. He remained in England throughout the First Carlist War, playing no part in it on account of his youth.

On 15 January 1837 the Cortes which was controlled by the Isabellists passed a law, ratified by the Queen Regent Maria Christina, which excluded Juan, his father, and brothers from the Spanish succession. By the same law the title of Infante of Spain was removed from Juan and his family. From the perspective of the Carlists this law was invalid.

== Marriage and other family relations ==
On 6 February 1847, Juan married Archduchess Maria Beatrix of Austria-Este, daughter of Francis IV, Duke of Modena and Princess Maria Beatrice of Savoy. The couple had two sons:

- Prince Carlos of Bourbon (1848–1909).
- Prince Alfonso Carlos of Bourbon (1849–1936).

Juan and Beatrix lived first in Modena, but had to leave during the revolution of 1848. After a brief time in Austria, they settled in London where their younger son was born. In spite of the conservatism and religious piety of his own family and particularly that of his wife, Juan developed liberal tendencies. He separated from his wife who returned to Modena where she raised her two sons.

In the mid-1850s Juan established an intimate relationship with Ellen Sarah Carter (1837-1910), an English commoner; her father was a merchant dealing in flowers and plants. Though upon christening of their daughter they were referred in the Clapham parish registry as “John Monfort and Helena Monfort (née Carter), legally married” it is not clear whether they actually married; in this case Juan would have been a bigamist. The couple had two children:

- Helen Mary Anne Joan Monfort (1859-1947)
- John Monfort (1861-1929)

Juan and Ellen Carter lived together until Juan’s death. Afterwards their children Helen and John were paid a regular pension by their half-brothers, first by Carlos and after 1909 by Alfonso. Helen married and had no children. John did marry and had many children, all born after Juan’s death. In the early 21st century his descendants, numbering over 50, lived in the UK, Norway and Canada. Currently the most senior male descendant of Juan (and the most senior male descendant of the Spanish king Charles IV, and possibly the most genealogically senior head of the Capetian dynasty) is his great-great-grandson, Hugh Geoffrey Monfort.

== Claimant to the throne of Spain ==
Juan played no part in the 1860 Carlist rising led by his brother Carlos Luis. On 21 April Carlos Luis was captured by the troops of Isabella II and forced to renounce his claims to the Spanish throne. On 2 June Juan published a declaration affirming his accession as Juan III, King of Spain; henceforward he used the title conde de Montizón (in commemoration of a commandery of the Order of Santiago which belonged to his father). Juan's accession declaration used phrases such as "the light and progress of the age"; these phrases caused great offence to many Carlists most of whom refused to support him.

Once he had left Spain, his brother Carlos Luis renounced his abdication. On 15 June he declared that it was invalid since he had been forced to sign against his will. Juan refused to accept his brother's declaration. Until the unexpected death of Carlos Luis the following January, there were two Carlist claimants.

During the early 1860s the popularity of the government of Isabella II continued to decline. Juan's liberal views, however, ensured that he was not a viable candidate for the Carlists. In 1866, Juan's elder son Carlos (now aged eighteen) asked his father to renounce his rights, but he did nothing. Two years later, however, on 3 October 1868, Juan signed a decree of abdication at Paris. He became an active supporter of his son Carlos' attempts to regain the Spanish throne in the Third Carlist War.

== Claimant to the throne of France ==
On 24 August 1883 Juan's distant cousin and brother-in-law Henri, Count of Chambord died. Henri had been the Legitimist claimant to the throne of France. Henri's widow, Archduchess Maria Theresa of Austria-Este, his nephews (children of his eldest sister Louise) and a minority of his supporters held that Juan as senior male descendant of Louis XIV was his successor. They proclaimed him as Jean III, King of France and Navarre. He issued a declaration saying, "Having become Head of the House of Bourbon by the death of my brother-in-law and cousin, the Comte de Chambord, I declare that I do not in any way renounce the rights to the throne of France which I have held since my birth". But other than this declaration he made no active claim to the French throne, nor showed any interest about it.

== Candidate for the Mexican throne ==
In 1821, when the Mexican Empire first achieved its independence, its original plan was for it to be ruled by a personal union with Ferdinand VII. Despite him declining the throne, many Mexican conservatives did not give up on their hope to have a Bourbon ruler as Emperor of Mexico.

During the Convention of London (1861) the issue was brought up that Juan, Count of Montizón could be a possible pretender to the Mexican throne. But it is noted that when offered the crown, he had declined it, thus the Mexican conservatives chose instead Archduke Ferdinand Maximilian to take the throne, who accepted it.

== Other ==
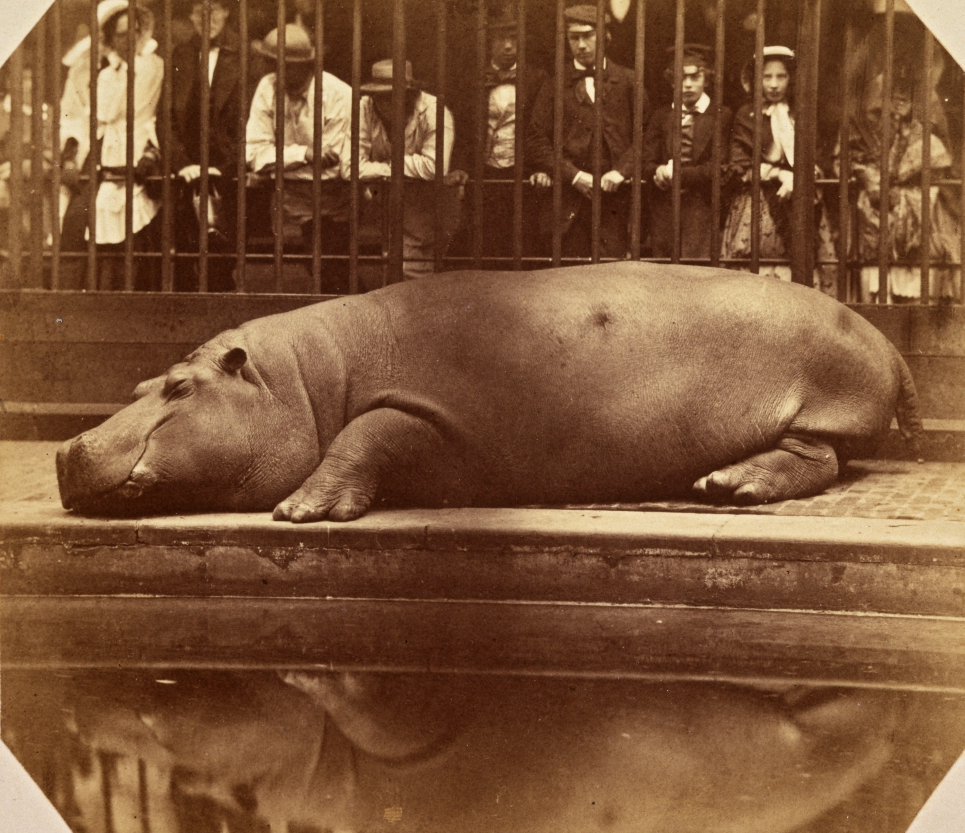
Obaysch, the hippopotamus at the Regent's Park Zoo, c. 1850. Photo by Juan, Count of Montizón.

Juan was an active photographer and a founder member of the Photographic Society (later the Royal Photographic Society) from 1853 and is last recorded as a member in 1866. Between 1850 and 1852, he took the first known photographs to emerge from the London Zoo. This series of 43 photographs was eventually purchased by Queen Victoria.

== Death ==
Juan died of angina at his home (25 Seafield Road) in Hove on Friday 18 November 1887. His death was registered by Ellen Sarah Carter. His body was moved to the Church of the Sacred Heart, Norton Road, Hove on 20 November, where he lay in state until his funeral mass was held on 24 November in the presence of his two legitimate sons, Don Carlos and Don Alfonso.

His body was moved on 6 January 1888 from Hove to St Katherine's Dock in London along with the body of his Mother, Queen Maria Francisa, who had been buried at the Roman Catholic Church of Our Lady, Gosport, where she had been laid to rest in September 1834. The bodies left aboard the General Steamship Navigation Company's vessel on 7 January bound for Hamburg and then via Berlin and Vienna and on to Trieste where it is buried in the chapel of Saint Charles Borromeo in Trieste Cathedral. The inscription on his tomb names him as the King of Spain.

== Ancestors ==
Ancestors of Prince Juan, Count of Montizón

8. Charles III of Spain
4. Charles IV of Spain
9. Maria Amalia of Saxony
2. Infante Carlos María Isidro of Spain
10. Philip, Duke of Parma
5. Maria Luisa of Parma
11. Louise-Élisabeth of France
1. Juan de Borbón y Braganza
12. Peter III of Portugal
6. John VI of Portugal
13. Maria I of Portugal
3. Infanta Maria Francisca of Portugal
14. Charles IV of Spain (= 4)
7. Carlota Joaquina of Spain
15. Maria Luisa of Parma (= 5)

Prince Juan, Count of Montizón House of Bourbon Cadet branch of the Capetian dynasty Born: 15 May 1822 Died: 21 November 1887
Titles in pretence
Preceded by Carlos Luis de Borbón	— TITULAR — King of Spain; Carlist pretender 13 January 1861 – 3 October 1868	Succeeded by Carlos de Borbón y Austria-Este
Preceded by Henri, Count of Chambord	— TITULAR — King of France; Legitimist succession 24 August 1883 – 21 November 1887	Succeeded by Carlos de Borbón y Austria-Este
