= Trieste Cathedral =

Cathedral in Trieste, Italy

Trieste Cathedral Basilica cattedrale di San Giusto Martire (in Italian)
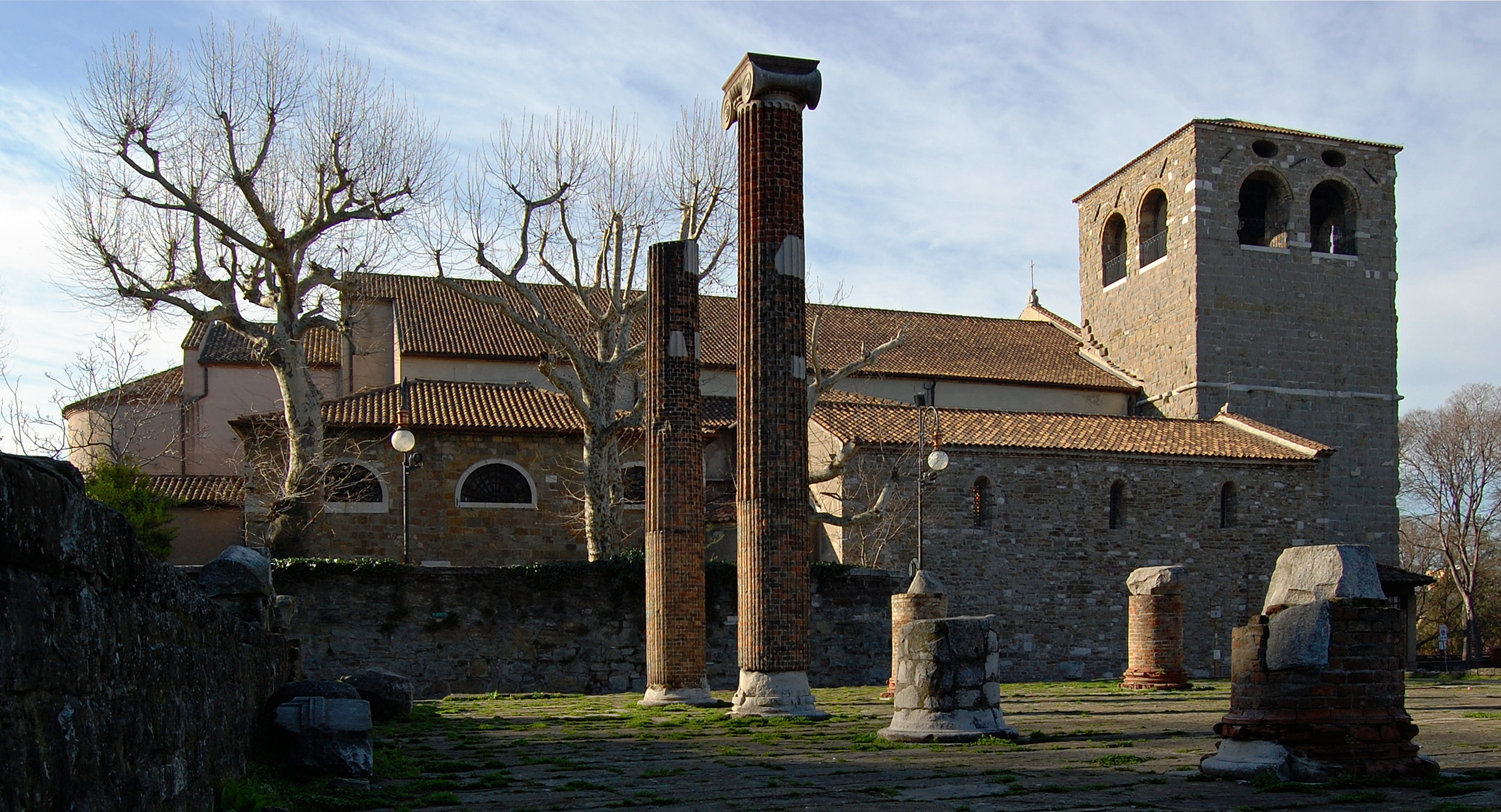
- Trieste Cathedral

Religion
- Affiliation: Roman Catholic
- Diocese: Diocese of Trieste
- Rite: Roman
- Ecclesiastical or organisational status: Cathedral
- Year consecrated: 1385

Location
- Location: Trieste, Italy
- Interactive map of Trieste Cathedral; Basilica cattedrale di San Giusto Martire (in Italian)
- Coordinates: 45°38′47″N 13°46′21″E

Architecture
- Type: Church
- Style: Romanesque, Gothic
- Groundbreaking: 1302
- Completed: 1320

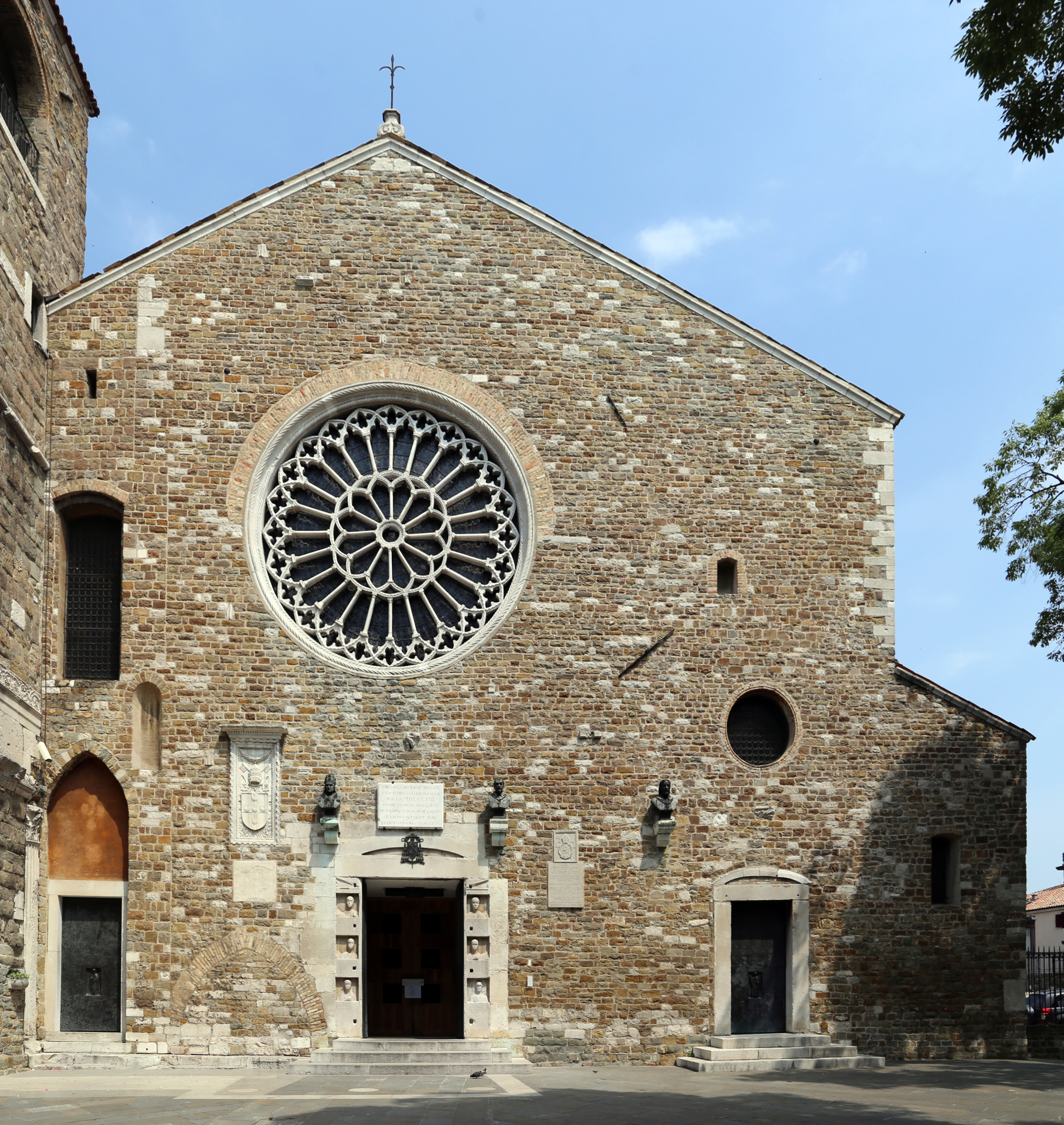
The cathedral façade, including a figure of Saint Justus in the frame on the bell tower to the far left

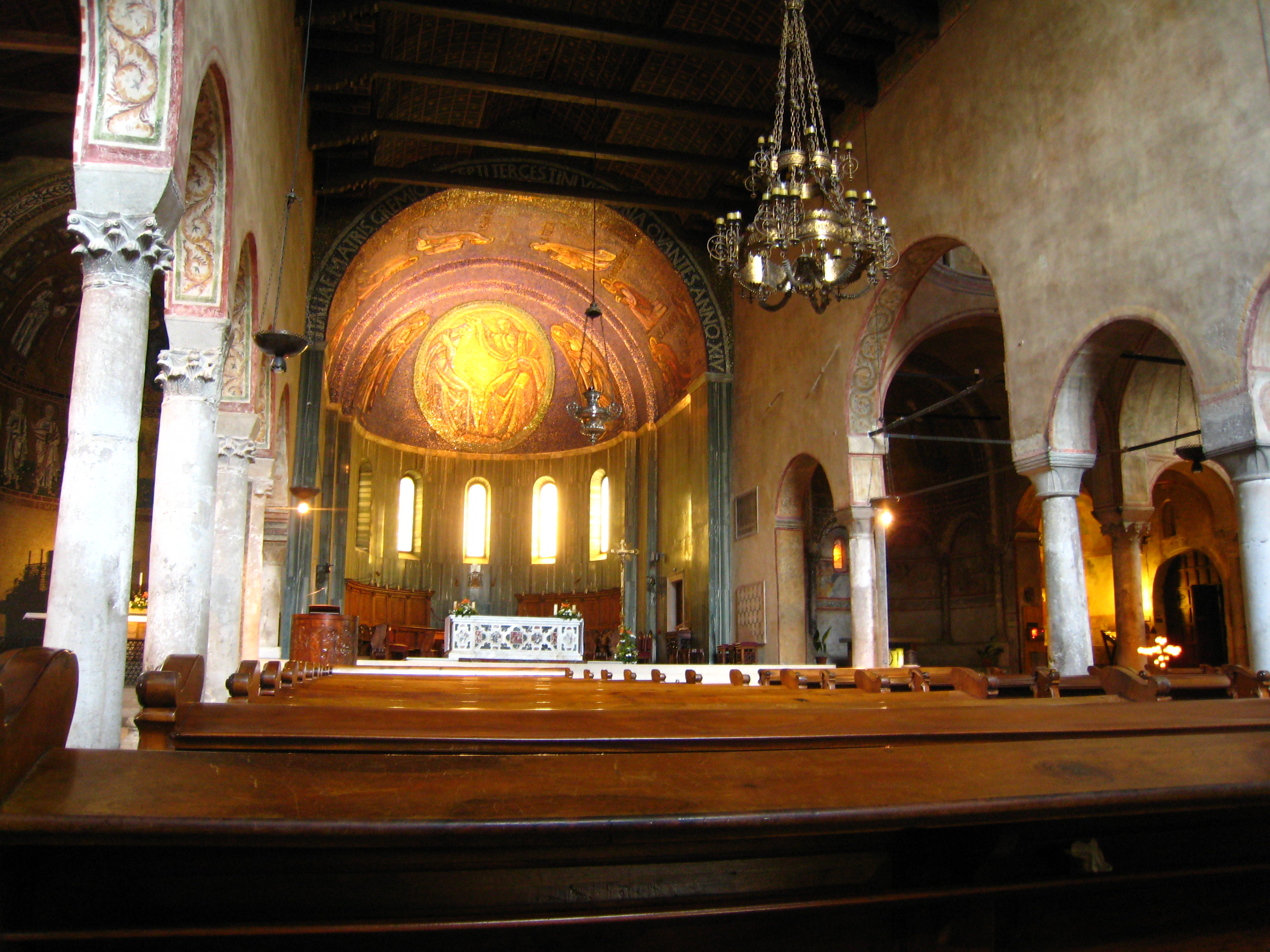
View of the interior

Trieste Cathedral (Italian: Basilica cattedrale di San Giusto Martire), dedicated to Saint Justus, is a Roman Catholic cathedral in Trieste, in northeastern Italy. It is the seat of the Bishop of Trieste.

In 1899, Pope Leo XIII granted it the status of a basilica minor.

== History ==
The first religious edifice on the site was built in the 6th century on a Roman propylaea, using part of the existing structure. Perhaps the entrance to a monument, this was commonly known as the Capitoline Temple, as a pyramidal altar with the symbols of the Capitoline Triad (Jupiter, Juno and Minerva) had been discovered inside it.

In the main hall, the original remains of part of the mosaic floor is integrated into the present-day floor, which contains markings of the outer walls of the early Christian building. Soon after it was opened for worship, the church was destroyed in the Lombard invasion.

Between the 9th and 11th centuries, two basilicas were erected on the ruins of the old church, the first dedicated to Our Lady of the Assumption and the second, the cathedral, to Saint Justus (San Giusto). The original design of the latter building was subsequently lengthened. In the 14th century, the two basilicas were joined by means of the demolition of one nave of either basilica and the construction of a simple asymmetrical façade, dominated by a delicately worked Gothic rose window, as ornate as the new bell tower, using the Romanesque debris stones found on the site and friezes of arms.

== Carlist mausoleum ==
The Chapel of Saint Charles Borromeo serves as the burial chapel for the family of the Carlist claimants to the throne of Spain. It contains the tombs of:

- Infante Carlos, Count of Molina (Carlos V)
- Infanta Maria Francisca of Portugal, first wife of the Count of Molina
- Teresa, Princess of Beira, second wife of the Count of Molina
- Infante Carlos, Count of Montemolin (Carlos VI)
- Princess Maria Carolina of Bourbon-Two Sicilies, wife of the Count of Montemolin
- Juan, Count of Montizón (Juan III)
- Infante Fernando of Spain, brother of the Count of Montemolin and the Count of Montizón
- Carlos, Duke of Madrid (Carlos VII)
- Archduke Franz Josef of Austria, Prince of Tuscany

== Works of art ==
Among the works of historical interest in the cathedral are the apsidal mosaics depicting Our Lady of the Assumption and Christ between Saints Justus and Servolus, laid by master craftsmen from Veneto in the 12th-13th centuries. The small 14th-century church of San Giovanni (Saint John), the old baptistry on the left and San Michele al Carnale on the right, by the entrance to the museum, complete a fine medieval churchyard.

In the square in front of the church is an altar commemorating the consecration and laying down of the arms of the 3rd Army. There is also a column with a halberd and a monument to those who died in the First World War.

Archaeological excavations carried out here in the 1930s laid bare the remains of the Roman forum and civic building constructed on two colonnaded floors with two apses. Two lower-floor columns have been reconstructed.

The 5 bells are tuned in scale of G major.
