= Maria Isabel of Braganza =

Queen of Spain from 1816 to 1818

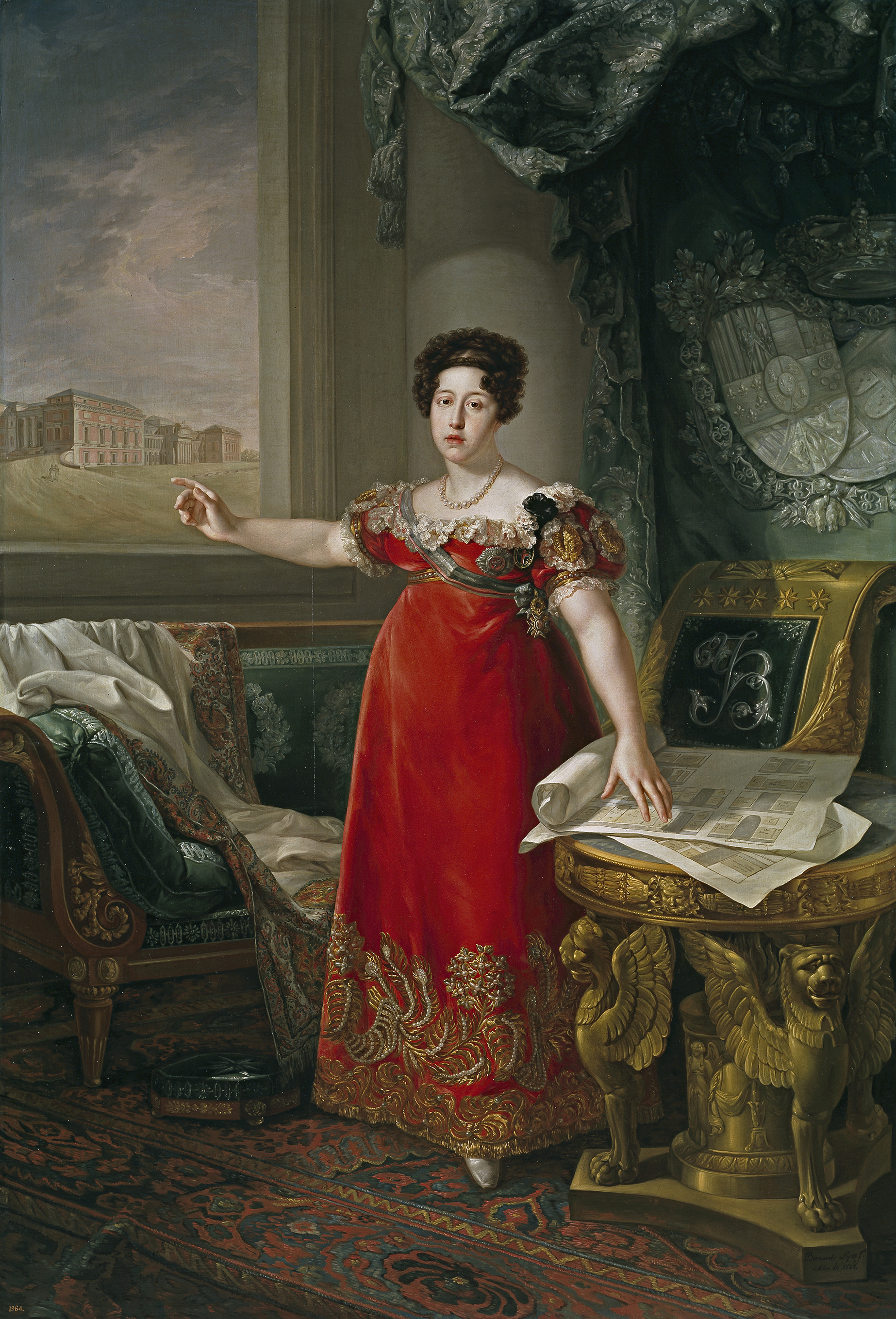
- Posthumous portrait by Bernardo López y Piquer depicting Maria Isabel as founder of the Museo del Prado, 1829

Queen consort of Spain
- Tenure: 29 September 1816 – 26 December 1818
- Born: 19 May 1797; Palace of Queluz, Portugal
- Died: 26 December 1818 (aged 21); Royal Palace of Aranjuez, Aranjuez, Spain
- Burial: El Escorial
- Spouse: Ferdinand VII of Spain (m. 1816)
- Issue Detail: Infanta María Luisa Isabel; Infanta María Luisa Isabel
Names
- Maria Isabel Francisca de Assis Antónia Carlota Joana Josefa Xavier de Paula Micaela Rafaela Isabel Gonzaga de Bragança
- House: Braganza
- Father: John VI of Portugal
- Mother: Carlota Joaquina of Spain

Maria Isabel of Braganza (Maria Isabel Francisca de Assis Antónia Carlota Joana Josefa Xavier de Paula Micaela Rafaela Isabel Gonzaga; 19 May 1797 – 26 December 1818) was a Portuguese infanta who became Queen of Spain as the second wife of King Ferdinand VII.

Maria Isabel was the second surviving child and daughter of King John VI of Portugal and Queen Carlota Joaquina. Due to the invasion of Portugal by Napoleon in 1807, the royal family fled to their colony of Brazil in South America.

When Queen Maria I, Maria Isabel's paternal grandmother, died in 1816, the family returned to Portugal. That same year, her marriage to her uncle King Ferdinand VII of Spain occurred and Maria Isabel relocated to Spain. She quickly became pregnant and gave birth in 1817; however, the infant died within six months. Her second delivery not long after was difficult; the baby was breech and her second daughter died in the womb. Maria Isabel was presumed dead and bled to death after a fatal caesarean was ordered by her husband.

As queen, Maria Isabel had been deeply interested in art and amassed a great collection in order to open a royal museum, which was opened after her death, now known as the Prado Museum.

== Early years ==
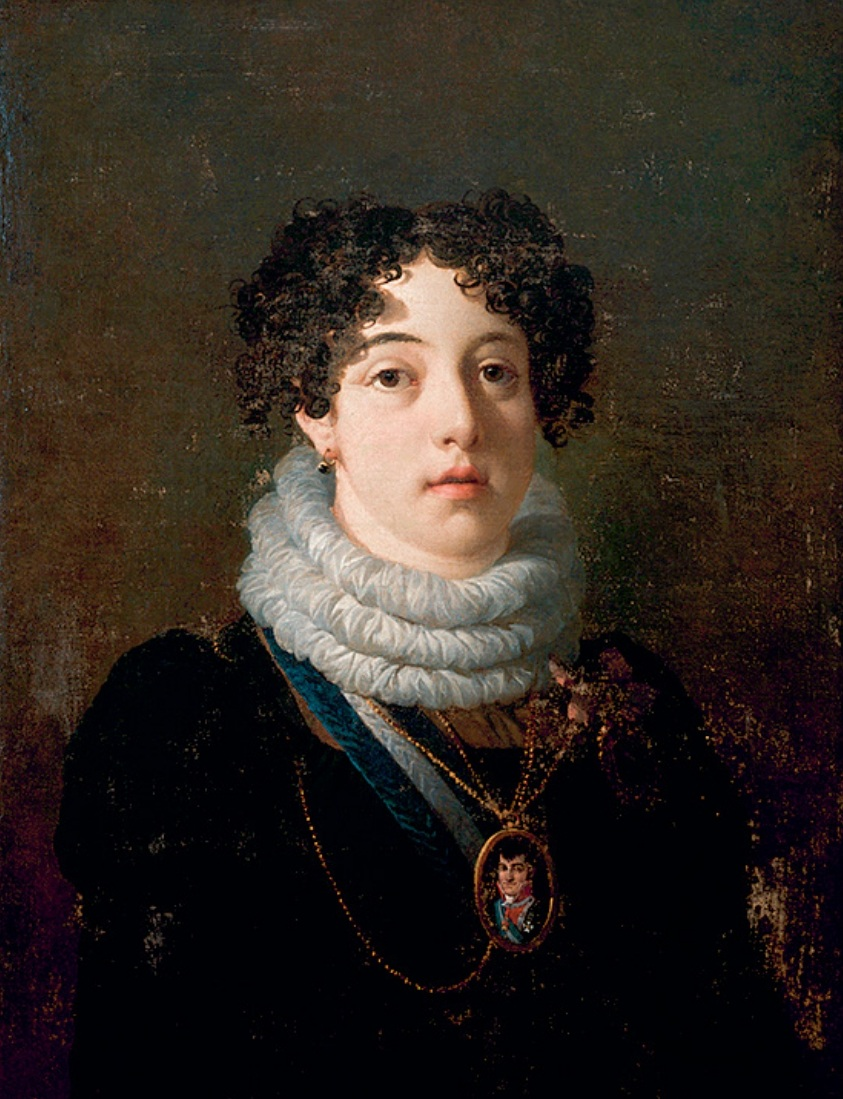
Portrait by Nicolas-Antoine Taunay, 1815

Infanta Maria Isabel of Portugal was born on 19 May 1797 as the third child and second daughter of King John VI of Portugal and his wife Queen Carlota Joaquina. The marriage between her father and mother was unhappy, Carlota Joaquina attempting to have King John VI deemed insane.

In 1807 Napoleon invaded Portugal, and the royal family unwillingly fled to Brazil. Maria Isabel's mother Carlota sent her eldest surviving son, Pedro, to join his father and grandmother on board the ship Principe Real whilst Carlota and the rest of her children would board the Affonso d'Albuquerque.

Upon their arrival, Carlota and her children were forced to shave their heads and wear white muslin hats.

=== Upbringing ===
Maria Isabel and her siblings were carefully educated by her mother liberally. Maria Isabel was noted to be kind, balanced and shy, and was much like her father within her personality.

== Marriage ==
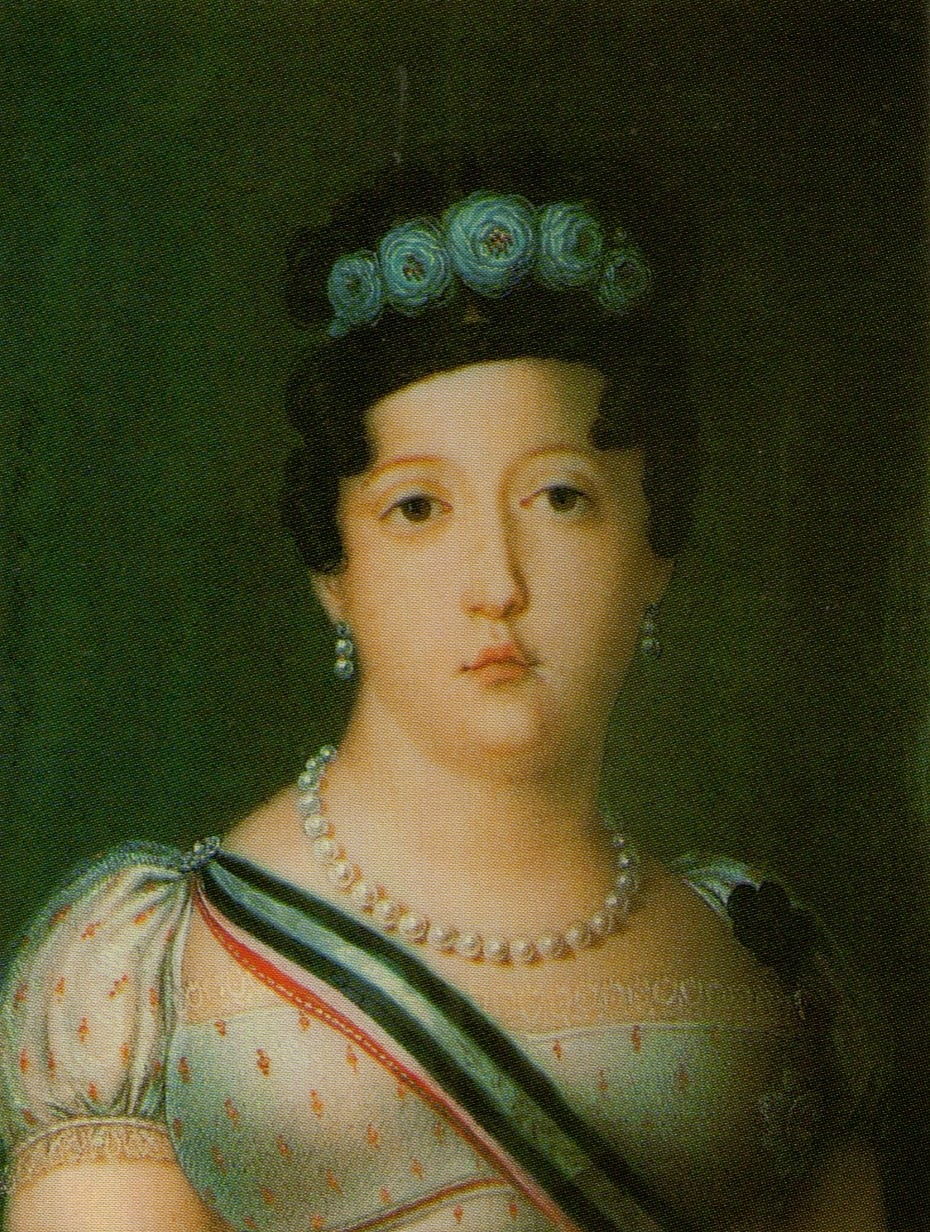
Portrait by Luis de la Cruz, 1816

On 20 March 1816, Queen Maria I of Portugal died. Due to this, Maria Isabel's father John became the King of Portugal and Brazil. On 22 February 1816, marriage contracts between Ferdinand VII of Spain (her uncle) and Maria Isabel were officially signed; they would soon marry on 29 September. At the same time, another marriage between her sister Infanta Maria Francisca and Ferdinand's brother Carlos, Count of Molina, was facilitated. At the end of the year the two princesses were received in Cádiz with great pomp and ceremony.

Towards the end of the year, Maria Isabel and Ferdinand settled in Madrid. There, she quickly became pregnant. Maria Isabel gave birth to a daughter, whom they named María Luisa Isabel, on 21 August 1817. Her daughter died less than five months later.

== Death ==
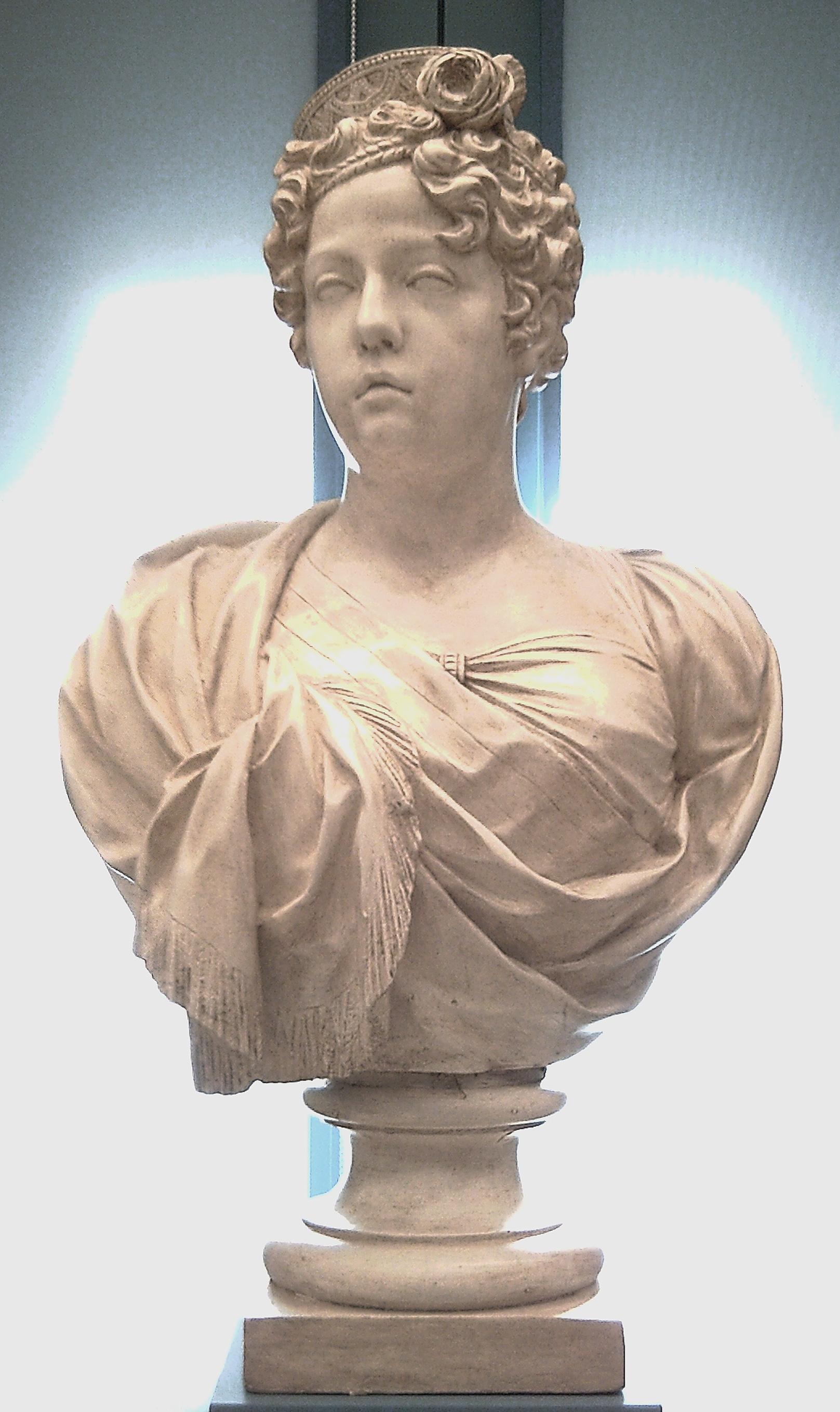
Portrait bust by José Ginés, 1820s

Maria Isabel was pregnant soon after the birth of María Luisa Isabel, but the birth was indeed a difficult one: the baby was in breech and the physicians soon found that the child had died. Maria Isabel stopped breathing soon thereafter and the doctors thought she was dead.

Maria Isabel's sister protested against the doctors' thoughts on presuming her dead. The king, however, ordered a fatal caesarean. When they started cutting her stomach to extract the dead fetus, she suddenly shouted in pain and collapsed on her bed, bleeding heavily. She died soon afterwards on 26 December 1818 in the Palace of Aranjuez, and was buried at the Escorial—the royal site of San Lorenzo de El Escorial.

== Legacy ==
Queen Maria Isabel's dedication and affection for art led her to gather many treasures from the past and create a royal museum, which would end up being the beginnings of Museo del Prado. It opened on 19 November 1819, a year after the queen's death.

== Issue ==
Children of Queen Maria Isabel of Portugal
Name	Lifespan	Notes
María Luisa Isabel; Infanta María Luisa Isabel	21 August 1817 – 9 January 1818	Died in infancy, four months after birth.
María Luisa Isabel; Infanta María Luisa Isabel	26 December 1818	Stillborn. Given the same name as her elder sister.

== Ancestors ==
Ancestors of Maria Isabel of Braganza

8. John V of Portugal
4. Peter III of Portugal
9. Maria Anna of Austria
2. John VI of Portugal
10. Joseph I of Portugal
5. Maria I of Portugal
11. Mariana Victoria of Spain
1. Maria Isabel of Portugal
12. Charles III of Spain
6. Charles IV of Spain
13. Maria Amalia of Saxony
3. Carlota Joaquina of Spain
14. Philip, Duke of Parma
7. Maria Luisa of Parma
15. Louise Élisabeth of France

== Honours and arms ==
Coat of arms of Maria Isabel of Portugal, Queen of Spain

- Dame of the Order of Queen Maria Luisa
- Dame of the Order of Saint Isabel

== See also ==
- Napoleonic Wars

Maria Isabel of Braganza House of Braganza Born: 19 May 1797 Died: 26 December 1818
Spanish royalty
Vacant Title last held by Julie Clary	Queen consort of Spain; 1816–1818	Vacant Title next held by Maria Josepha Amalia of Saxony
