= Infanta Maria Teresa of Braganza =

- Princess of Beira; Infanta Pedro Carlos of Spain and Portugal; Countess of Molina
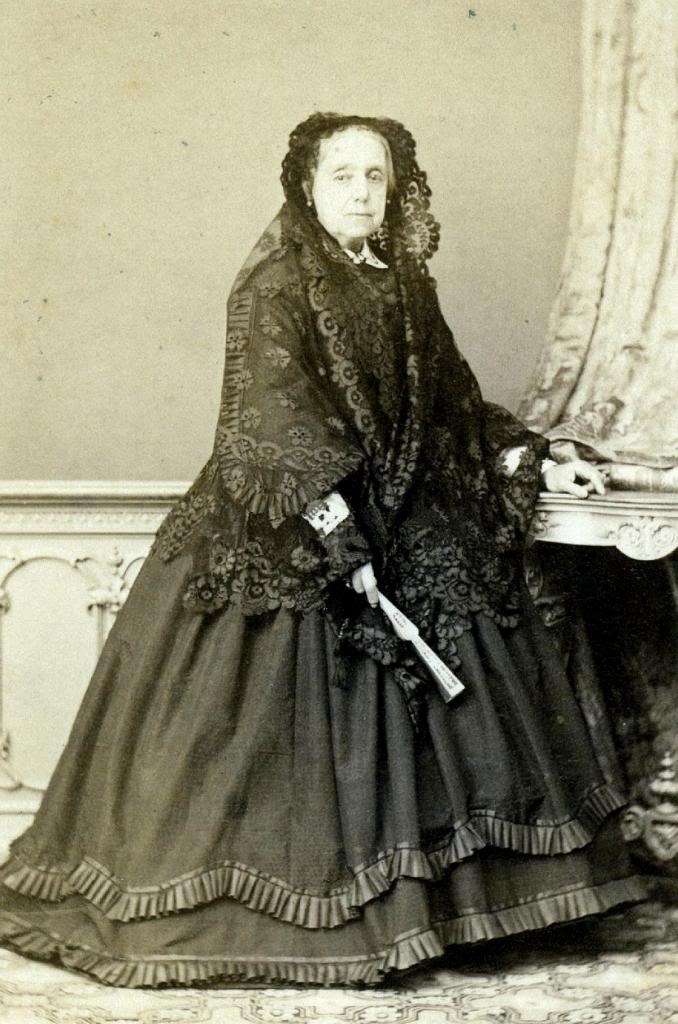

Consort of the Carlist pretender to the Spanish throne
- Pretence: 20 October 1838 – 18 May 1845
- Born: 29 April 1793; Ajuda, Lisbon, Kingdom of Portugal
- Died: 17 January 1874 (aged 80); Trieste, Austria-Hungary
- Burial: Trieste Cathedral
- Spouse: Infante Pedro Carlos of Spain and Portugal (m. 1810; died 1812) Infante Carlos, Count of Molina (m. 1838; died 1855)
- Issue: Infante Sebastião of Spain and Portugal
Names
- Maria Teresa Francisca de Assis Antónia Carlota Joana Josefa Xavier de Paula Micaela Rafaela Isabel Gonzaga
- House: Braganza
- Father: John VI of Portugal
- Mother: Carlota Joaquina of Spain

Infanta Maria Teresa of Braganza (Portuguese pronunciation: [mɐˈɾiɐ tɨˈɾezɐ] or [ˈtɾezɐ]; 29 April 1793 – 17 January 1874) was the firstborn child of John VI of Portugal and Carlota Joaquina of Spain. From 1828 to 1834, she was heiress presumptive to the Portuguese throne.

== Early life ==
Maria Teresa Francisca de Assis Antónia Carlota Joana Josefa Xavier de Paula Micaela Rafaela Isabel Gonzaga was born in Ajuda, Lisbon, in 1793 during the reign of her grandmother Queen Maria I. Maria Teresa was the eldest child of the Prince and Princess of Brazil (later King John VI and Carlota Joaquina). Her mother was the daughter of Charles IV of Spain. As the eldest child of the heir apparent, Maria Teresa was granted the title Princess of Beira, which she held until her brother Francisco António was born in 1795.

== Marriage ==
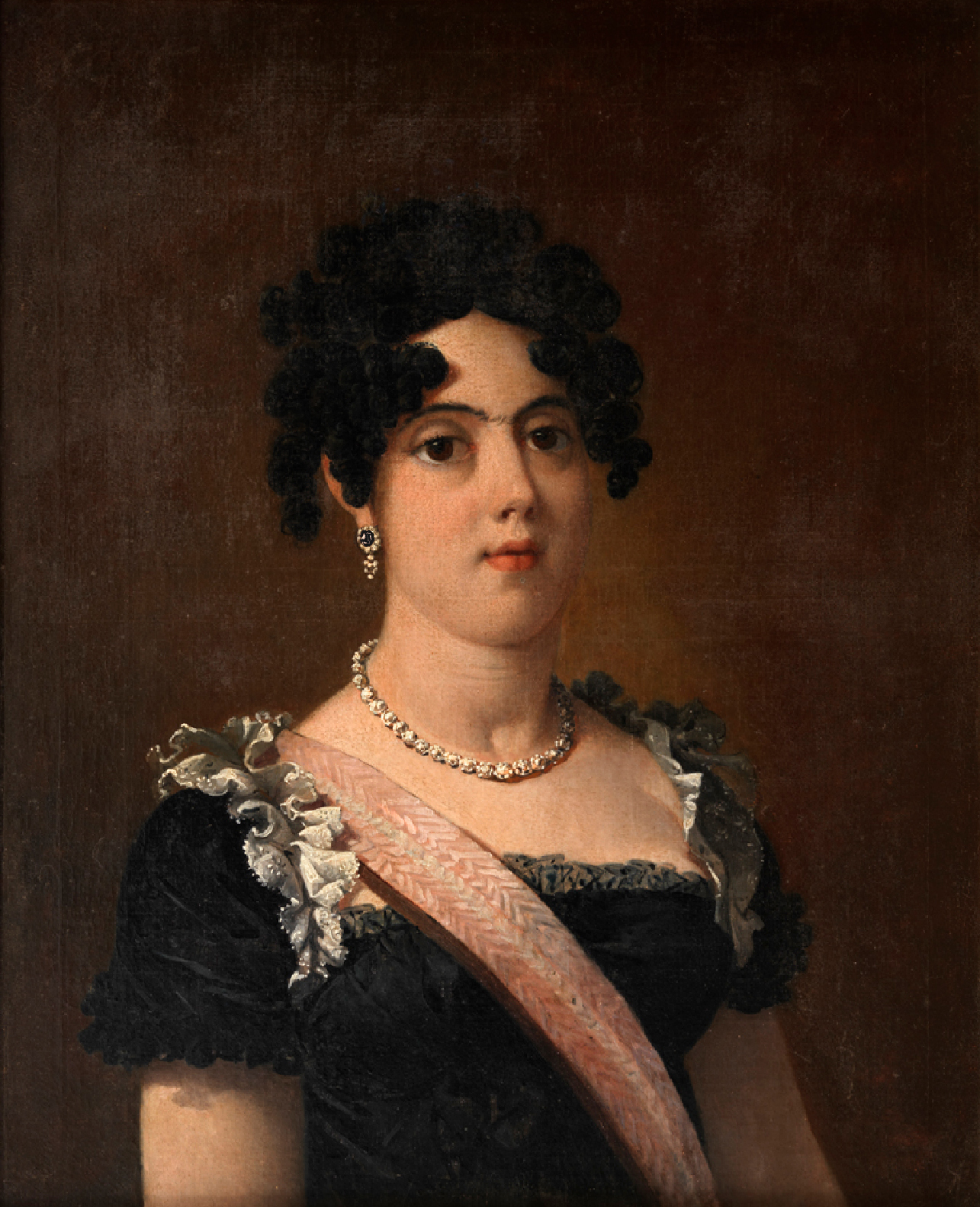
Portrait by Nicolas-Antoine Taunay, 1817.

She was married on 13 May 1810 in Rio de Janeiro (where the royal family was exiled because of the Napoleonic Wars) to her cousin Infante Pedro Carlos, Prince of Spain and Portugal. She was widowed on 26 May 1812, soon after giving birth to her only child, a son, Infante Sebastian of Portugal and Spain (1811–1875).

Very conservative, she was an ally of her younger brother Miguel I of Portugal in his attempts to obtain the throne of Portugal (civil war 1826–1834), and of her brother-in-law and uncle Infante Don Carlos, Count of Molina in his attempts to obtain the Spanish throne. Following Miguel's accession in 1828, Maria Teresa became heiress presumptive to her then childless brother, and would remain so until his deposition in 1834. In the last years of the reign of her uncle Ferdinand VII of Spain (died 1833), Teresa lived in Madrid and plotted to strengthen Don Carlos' position in succession. She participated in the First Carlist War (1833–1839), being a leading supporter of Carlism, church and reactionary interests. Her sister Francisca, Titular Queen of Spain, wife of Carlos, died in 1834.

== Spanish succession ==
On 15 January 1837, the Cortes of Spain legislated her excluded from the Spanish succession, rights belonging to her in descent from her mother, on grounds of her being a rebel along with Don Carlos. Her son Sebastian's rights were similarly excluded, but he was later, in 1859, restored in Spain. Also don Carlos' sons and Teresa's brother Miguel I of Portugal were excluded at the same law.

The next year she married again, in 1838, to her brother-in-law, uncle and longtime ally, Infante Carlos of Spain (1788–1855), whom she viewed as the rightful king of Spain; the widower of her sister Maria Francisca. The second marriage remained childless, but she took care of her stepsons, who were also her nephews and cousins. Following her marriage, her claim as the Miguelist heir passed to her only son by her first marriage, Infante Sebastião.

They soon left Spain because of unsuccess in the civil war, and never returned. She died in Trieste on 17 January 1874, having survived her second husband by nineteen years.

== Honours ==
- Dame Grand Cross of the Order of the Immaculate Conception of Vila Viçosa
- Dame of the Order of Queen Saint Isabel
- Dame of the Order of Queen Maria Luisa

== Ancestry ==
Ancestors of Infanta Maria Teresa of Braganza

8. John V of Portugal
4. Peter III of Portugal
9. Maria Anna of Austria
2. John VI of Portugal
10. Joseph I of Portugal
5. Maria I of Portugal
11. Mariana Victoria of Spain
1. Infanta Maria Teresa of Braganza
12. Charles III of Spain
6. Charles IV of Spain
13. Maria Amalia of Saxony
3. Carlota Joaquina of Spain
14. Philip, Duke of Parma
7. Maria Luisa of Parma
15. Louise Élisabeth of France

Infanta Maria Teresa of Braganza House of Braganza Cadet branch of the House of Aviz Born: 29 April 1793 Died: 17 January 1874
Titles in pretence
Vacant Title last held by Infanta Maria Francisca of Portugal	— TITULAR — Queen consort of Spain; 20 October 1838 – 18 May 1845	Vacant Title next held by Maria Carolina of Bourbon-Two Sicilies
