= Infante Carlos María Isidro of Spain =

Spanish infante (1788–1855)

Carlos María Isidro de Borbón
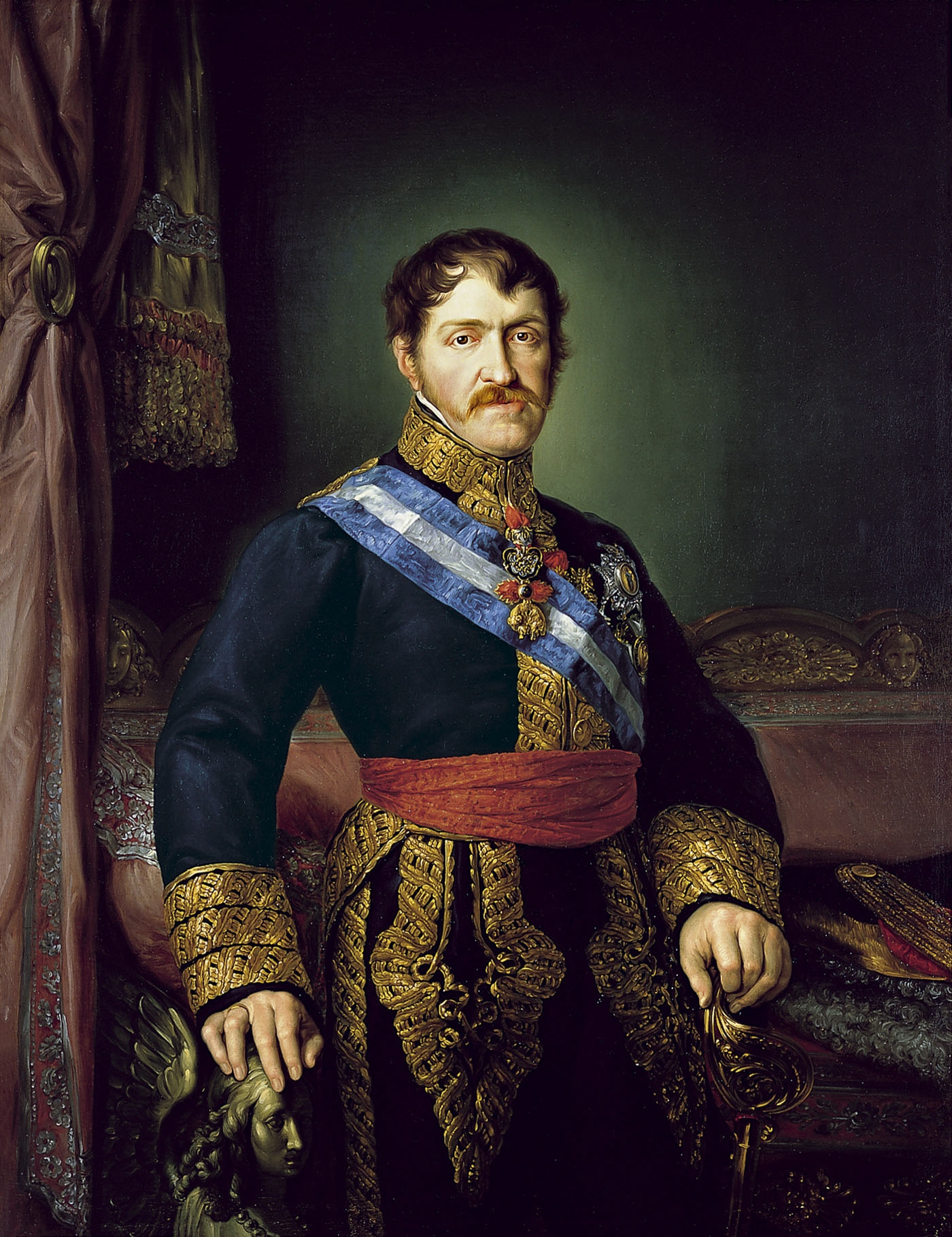
- Portrait by Vicente López Portaña, c. 1823

Carlist pretender to the Spanish throne
- Pretence: 29 September 1833 – 18 May 1845
- Successor: Carlos, Count of Montemolin
- Born: 29 March 1788; Palacio Real de Aranjuez, Spain
- Died: 10 March 1855 (aged 66); Trieste, Austria
- Burial: Trieste Cathedral
- Spouse: Infanta Maria Francisca of Portugal (m. 1816; died 1834) Infanta Maria Teresa of Portugal (m. 1838)
- Issue: Infante Carlos Luis; Infante Juan; Infante Fernando
Names
- Carlos María Isidro Benito de Borbón y Borbón-Parma
- House: Bourbon-Anjou
- Father: Charles IV of Spain
- Mother: Maria Luisa of Parma

Don Carlos María Isidro Benito de Borbón y Borbón-Parma (29 March 1788 – 10 March 1855) was an Infante of Spain and the second surviving son of King Charles IV of Spain and Maria Luisa of Parma. He claimed the throne of Spain after the death of his older brother King Ferdinand VII in 1833. His claim was contested by liberal forces loyal to the dead king's infant daughter, resulting in the First Carlist War (1833–1840). Don Carlos had support from the Basque provinces and much of Catalonia, but lost the war. His heirs continued the traditionalist cause, fought two more Carlist wars and were active into the mid-20th century, but never gained the throne.

== Early life ==
Carlos was born on 29 March 1788 at the Palacio Real de Aranjuez in Aranjuez, in what is now the Community of Madrid. In 1808, Napoleon captured Madrid in the Battle of Somosierra and he induced Carlos's father, Charles IV, and Carlos's older brother, Ferdinand VII, to renounce their rights to the throne of Spain, in favour for his brother, Joseph. But Carlos, who was heir presumptive to his brother, refused to renounce his rights to the throne, which he considered to have been given to him by God. From 1808 until 1814, he and his brothers were prisoners of Napoleon at the palace of Valençay in France.

In 1814, Carlos and the rest of the Spanish royal family returned to Madrid following release based on the Treaty of Valençay. In September 1816, he married his niece, Infanta Maria Francisca of Portugal (1800–1834), daughter of King John VI of Portugal and Carlos's sister Carlota Joaquina. Francisca was also sister of the second wife of Carlos's brother, Ferdinand VII. The couple had three sons:

- Carlos Luis de Borbón (1818–1861), known as Count of Montemolin
- Juan de Borbón y Braganza (1822–1887), known as Count of Montizón
- Fernando de Borbón y Braganza (1824–1861)

Apart from several formal offices, Carlos took no significant part in the government of Spain. Ferdinand VII had found it necessary to cooperate with the moderate liberals and to sign a Constitution. Carlos, however, was known for his firm belief in the divine right of kings to govern absolutely, the rigid orthodoxy of his religious opinions, and his personal piety.

During the revolutionary troubles of 1820–1823 (the 'liberal triennium'), Carlos was threatened by the extreme radicals, but no attack was made on him. While there were certain conservatives in Spain who wanted to put Carlos on the throne immediately, Carlos himself was a firm believer in legitimate succession and would never have taken up arms against his brother.

== Pragmatic Sanction of 1830 ==
In May 1830, Ferdinand VII published the Pragmatic Sanction by removing the Salic law in Spain, again allowing daughters to succeed to the Spanish throne as well as sons. This decree had originally been approved by the Cortes in 1786, but it had never been officially promulgated. On 10 October 1830, Ferdinand's wife gave birth to a daughter, Isabella, who thereupon displaced her uncle in the line of succession.

The clerical party (Spanish: apostólicos) continued to support the rights of Carlos to the throne. They considered the Pragmatic Sanction not only impractical but also illegal. They intrigued in favour of Carlos, but he himself would do no more than assert his rights in words. His wife and her sister, Maria Teresa (1793–1874), the former princess of Beira, on the other hand, were actively engaged in intrigues with the apostólicos.

In March 1833, Ferdinand "authorised" Carlos to go to Portugal with his wife and sister-in-law. The authorisation was in fact an order to remove Carlos and his adherents from Spain.

In April 1833, Ferdinand called upon Carlos to take an oath of allegiance to Isabella as Princess of Asturias, the title traditionally used by the first in line to the throne. In respectful but firm terms, Carlos refused. He had no personal desire for the throne, as expressed in his Manifiesto of Abrantes but he was adamant that he could not renounce what he considered to be his God-given rights and responsibilities.

== Reign ==
Ferdinand VII died on 29 September 1833. In Madrid, his widow declared herself regent for their daughter. On 1 October, Carlos issued a manifesto declaring his own accession to the throne. He informed the members of Maria Cristina's government that they were confirmed in their posts, and proceeded to the Portuguese-Spanish border. There, he was met by forces loyal to Maria Cristina and Isabella, who threatened to arrest him. Carlos remained in Portugal, which itself was in a state of civil war between the adherents of Carlos's nephew and brother-in-law Miguel and his grand-niece, Miguel's niece Maria II. In Spain, there were various risings which developed into the First Carlist War.

When the Miguelist party was finally beaten in Portugal in 1834, Carlos escaped to the United Kingdom, where the government offered to grant him an annual pension of £30,000 if he would renounce his claims and never return to Spain or Portugal, but Carlos completely refused. In July, he passed over to France, where he was actively aided by the Legitimist party. He soon joined his adherents at Elizondo in the western Pyrenees of Spain. In October 1834, his sister-in-law Cristina issued a decree depriving him of his rights as an Infante of Spain; this was confirmed by the Cortes in 1837.

Carlos remained in Spain for five years. During these years, he accompanied his armies, without displaying any of the qualities of a general or even much personal courage. But he endured a good deal of hardship, and was often compelled to take to hiding in the hills. On these occasions, he was often carried over difficult places on the back of a stout guide commonly known as the "royal jackass" (burro real).

The semblance of a court which Carlos maintained was torn by incessant personal intrigues. While some of his adherents supported him because they believed in his hereditary rights to the throne, others were more concerned about preserving home rule in the Basque districts. There were ongoing conflicts between Carlos's military staff and the clergy who exercised significant influence over him.

In the first few years of the war, there were several moments when victory was within Carlos's grasp. The last of these was the so-called Royal Expedition of the summer of 1837, when Carlos himself accompanied his army from Navarre to the outskirts of Madrid. Carlos hoped to enter the city without any significant bloodshed, but when it became clear that only a battle would win the city, Carlos vacillated. After several days, Carlos himself decided to withdraw; his army melted away and was reduced to a third of its former strength.

His first wife having died in Britain in 1834, Carlos married her elder sister, his own niece Maria Teresa of Portugal, Princess of Beira in Biscay in October 1837.

In June 1838, Carlos appointed Rafael Maroto as his commander-in-chief. In February 1839, Maroto had four Carlist generals shot and issued a proclamation criticizing Carlos's court. When Carlos removed him from office, Maroto marched to Tolosa where Carlos was living and made him a virtual prisoner. Maroto was re-appointed commander-in-chief, and his opponents in Carlos's court were dismissed. Maroto then began private negotiations with Cristina's commander-in-chief, and in August 1839 abandoned Carlos completely.

== Exile ==
=== Bourges (1839–1845) ===
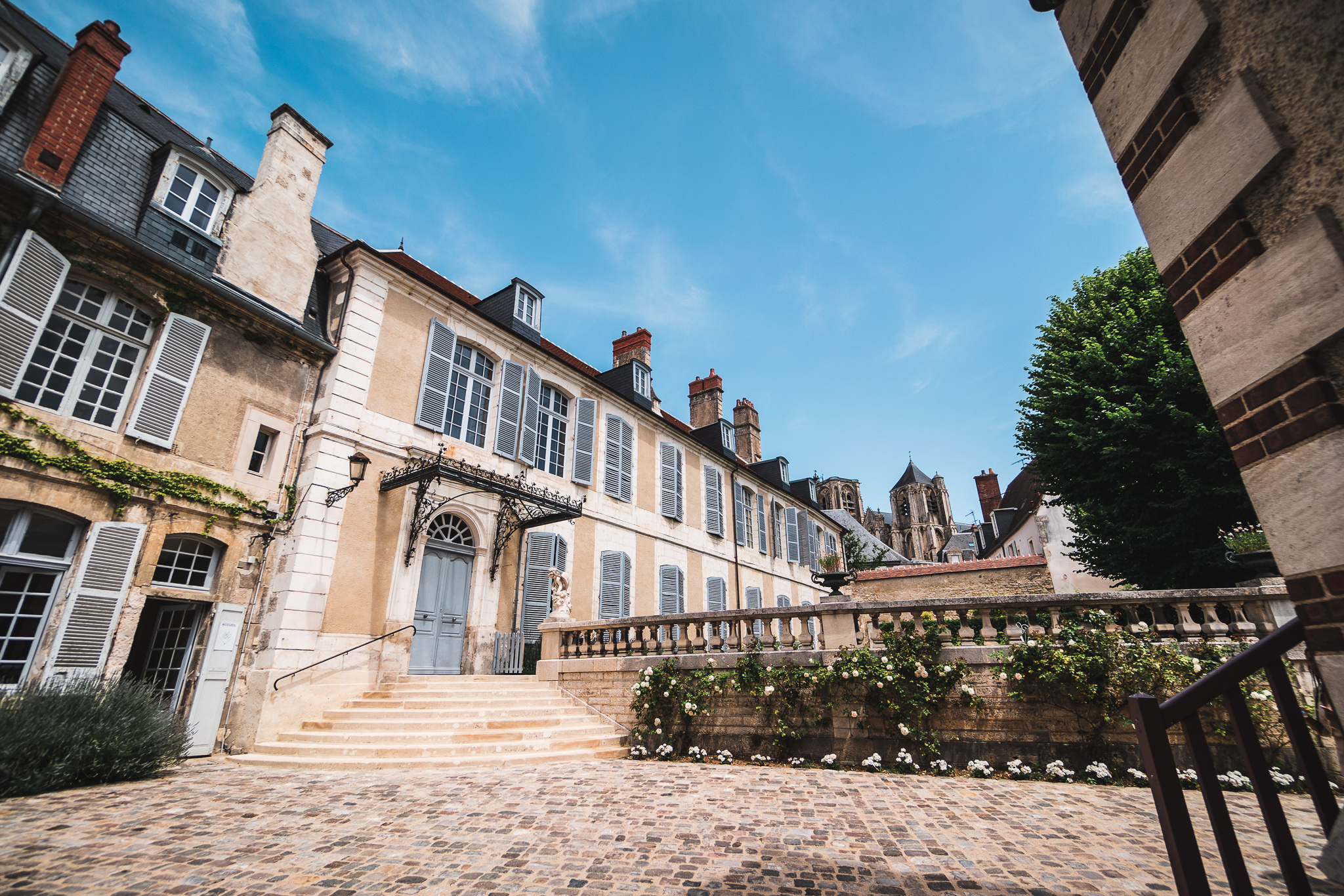
Hôtel De Panette, Bourges

Having crossed to France Carlos and his family initially stopped in Bordeaux, where for few days they remained in sort of a house arrest. He was given a choice of locations to settle, but it is not clear whether or how he responded. Modern historians speculate that it was the prime minister, marshal Soult, who picked the Cher department, located in central France 500 km from the Spanish frontier. The prefect was asked to find an appropriate location; he opted for the city of Bourges. The best he could have suggested was Hôtel Panette, a large but somewhat neglected residence in the centre of the city, which was rented for 2,000 francs per month. In late September 1839 Carlos settled there with his family and the court of some 30 people, including advisers, secretaries, chamberlains, confessors, a doctor, a pharmacist, preceptors for children, servants, cooks, grooms, a picketman, a coachman and a confectioner. Some of this staff, e.g. the confessors, had their own servants. The monthly cost of maintaining this court was around some 6,000 francs. The infant was supposed not to leave Bourges unless agreed with administration and not to engage in any political activity; he remained under supervision of governmental agents.

Carlos spent 5 years in Hôtel Panette. Throughout all this time he was accompanied by his second wife María Teresa de Braganza and by his oldest son Carlos Luis, then in his 20s; two younger sons, Juan and Fernando, during long strings were being educated in Genoa. The French administration tolerated visits of numerous Carlists, either exiled in France or arriving from Spain, given their arrivals were agreed in advance; apart from this, no official receptions or balls were given. There is little information available on their daily routine; most of it was related to religious chores. The royals attended the mass every day; they probably enjoyed the service as this was the sole case of them going out not accompanied by police agents. They also engaged in some local charity initiatives. Some scholars claim their life was marked by some puritan traits, especially that Carlos started to consider his war defeat in terms of divine punishment for his sins, while María Teresa had to do with company of 2-3 dames d'honneur and developed some depression. Unlike Carlos Luis, who watched military exercises of the French army in the neighborhood, Carlos did not attend. When in 1842 the violin professor of Carlos Luis suggested that he gives a family concert, Carlos objected; he noted that given the circumstances, enjoying music was immoral.

=== Act of Bourges (1845) ===
On 18 May 1845 La Gazette du Berri published (in Spanish, with French translations following) 4 documents: Carlos abdicated in favor of his son, Carlos Luis, while the latter accepted the hereditary claims transmitted; the papers are collectively referred to as the Act of Bourges. There are numerous motives of the abdication quoted by historians. Some are mostly personal: the 57-year-old claimant was increasing tired and tending to melancholy; his wife, diagnosed with serious respiratory and nervous problems, was heavily recommended to undergo treatment in Italian resorts, the trip the French government did not agree to unless the claim is renounced. Political considerations appear to be more important. There were serious plans developed and advanced in Spain to mend the dynastic feud; they consisted of marrying Carlos Luis with Isabella, and abdication was thought a step towards facilitating this marriage. It is possible that the plan was supported by Metternich; Marqués de Villafranca for few years has been acting as intermediary between Carlos and the Austrian chancellor, who kept suggesting abdication against longtime demurrals of the claimant. The French prime minister Guizot was neither averse to the project, though in case of France what mattered more was the position of king Louis Philippe I, who found it highly inconvenient to be forced to keep his relative in house arrest. Some scholars trace even the influence of the Russian Empire and the tsar Nicolas I personally. Last but not least, also Pope Gregory XVI recommended abdication; in his case a number of motives, related to position of the Catholic church in Spain, might have been in play. Following abdication Carlos adopted the title of Duke of Molina.

=== Last years (1845–1855) ===
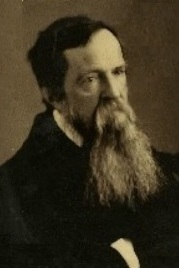
Don Carlos, photographed in the 1850s

In July 1845, two months following his abdication, Carlos and his wife were allowed to leave Bourges. They first travelled to Gréoux-les-Bains and then to Marseille, where the government – to great relief of king Louis Philippe – issued them passports. In the autumn via Nice they arrived in Genoa and then settled for few months of 1846 in Aix-les-Bains, at that time a spa in the Kingdom of Sardinia. In early 1847 the couple visited the Duchy of Modena to attend the wedding of Carlos' middle son Juan with Maria Beatrix of Austria-Este, sister of the ruling Duke of Modena, Francis V. In the autumn of 1847 they arrived in Venice, in the Austrian-held Kingdom of Lombardy-Venetia, and were hosted in Palazzo Rezzonico, the property of the Austria-Estes. The revolution and the anti-Habsburg rising of March 1848 forced them to flee Venice; they were leaving together with the Duchess of Berry towards her palace in Trieste. The Duchess left one floor of her palazzetto at what is now Via del Lazzaretto Vecchio at their disposal. The place became Carlos' last permanent residence; he was being paid a regular pension by the emperor Franz Joseph I and the tsar Nicholas I.

In 1849 Carlos, at the time in his early 60s, suffered a stroke; despite treatment in Baden, he did not regain full mobility. In 1850 the couple travelled to Kingdom of Two Sicilies to attended the wedding of Carlos' oldest son and at the time the Carlist claimant to the throne, who in Caserta married princess Maria Carolina of Bourbon-Two Sicilies. The youngest son Fernando, at the time single and in his late 20s, lived with his father in Trieste. In the early 1850s Carlos had 2 grandchildren from the marriage of Juan; however, in 1852 the latter abandoned his wife and settled in London. Carlos was admitting countless visitors, mostly Carlists, arriving either from Spain or from elsewhere in Europe, e.g. general Cabrera from London. The quasi-court, maintained in Trieste, amounted to at least 25 people; they included secretaries, advisors, aide-de-camps, a confessor, a chamberlain, a doctor, dames d'honneur and numerous servants, including a maggiordomo, butler, maids, cooks and others. Some historians write that though merely Conde de Molina, he "behaved like he were the king of Spain", but visitors were unimpressed by "povero palazzo" and some note his absent-minded gaze. Other historians claim that the alleged pompous and lavish lifestyle of Carlos is a myth, and that he led his life like that of a monk; very rarely leaving the building. He died at 18:00 CET on 10 March 1855, 19 days before his 67th birthday.

== Ancestors ==
Ancestors of Infante Carlos María Isidro of Spain

8. Philip V of Spain
4. Charles III of Spain
9. Elisabeth of Parma
2. Charles IV of Spain
10. Augustus III of Poland
5. Maria Amalia of Saxony
11. Maria Josepha of Austria
1. Infante Carlos María Isidro of Spain
12. Philip V of Spain (= 8)
6. Philip, Duke of Parma
13. Elisabeth of Parma (= 9)
3. Maria Luisa of Parma
14. Louis XV of France
7. Louise Élisabeth of France
15. Marie Leszczyńska

== Heraldry ==
Heraldry of Carlos of Spain
Coat of Arms as Infante of Spain	Coat of Arms as Pretender

== Notes ==
Infante Carlos María Isidro of Spain House of Bourbon Born: 29 March 1788 Died: 6 March 1855
Titles in pretence
Preceded by Ferdinand VII	— TITULAR — King of Spain; 29 September 1833 – 18 May 1845; Reason for succession failure: Pragmatic Sanction of 1830	Succeeded by Carlos Luis de Borbón
