= Maria Luisa of Parma =

Queen of Spain from 1788 to 1808

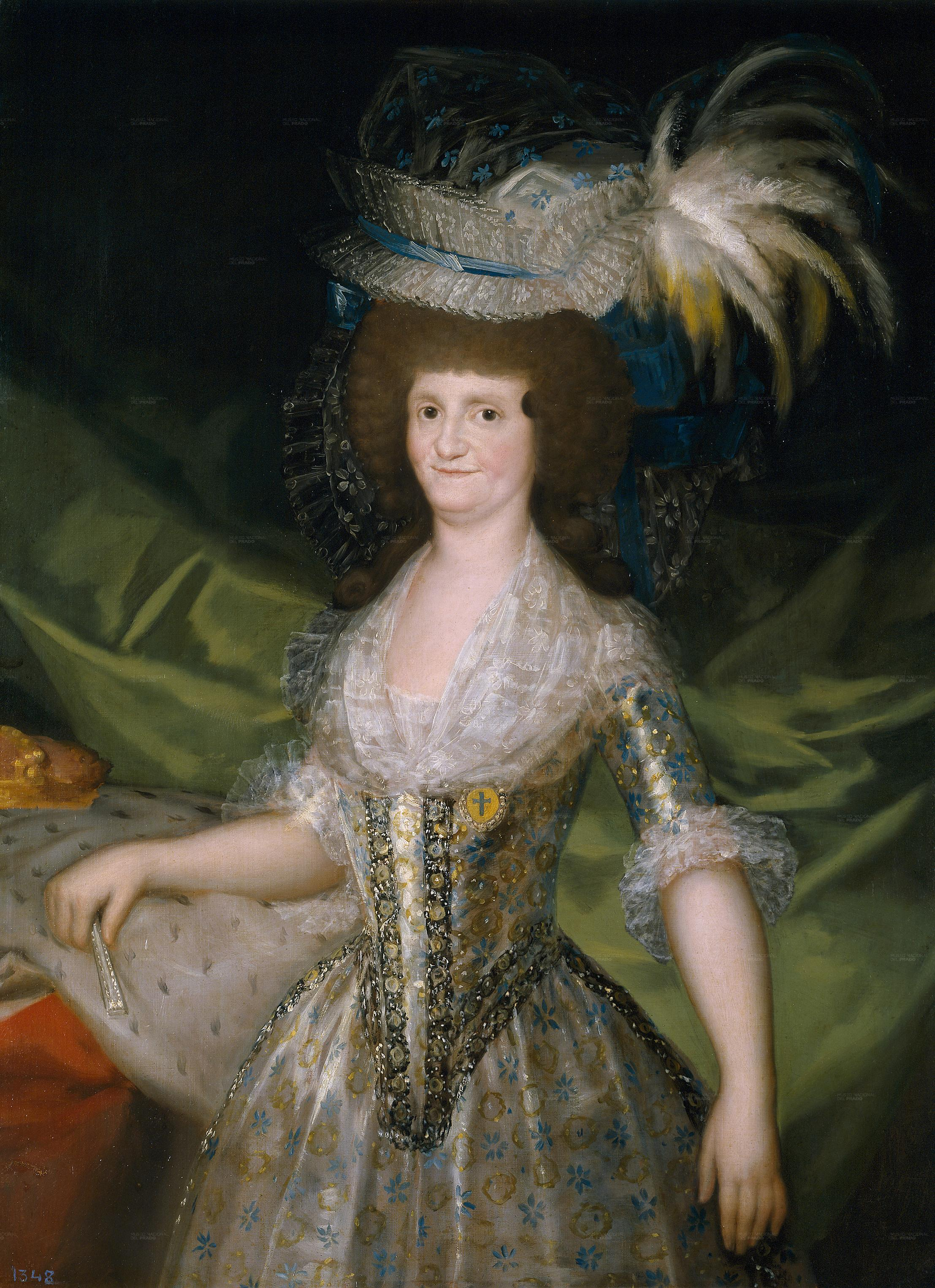
- Portrait by Goya, 1790

Queen consort of Spain
- Tenure: 14 December 1788 – 19 March 1808
- Born: 9 December 1751; Parma, Duchy of Parma
- Died: 2 January 1819 (aged 67); Palazzo Barberini, Rome, Papal States
- Burial: El Escorial
- Spouse: Charles IV of Spain (m. 1765)
- Issue Detail: Carlota Joaquina, Queen of Portugal; Infanta Maria Amalia; María Luisa, Queen of Etruria; Ferdinand VII, King of Spain; Infante Carlos, Count of Molina; Maria Isabel, Queen of the Two Sicilies; Infante Francisco de Paula
Names
- Spanish: Luisa María Teresa Ana; French: Louise Marie Thérèse Anne
- House: Bourbon-Parma
- Father: Philip, Duke of Parma
- Mother: Louise-Élisabeth of France

Maria Luisa of Parma (Luisa Maria Teresa Anna; 9 December 1751 – 2 January 1819) was, by marriage to King Charles IV of Spain, Queen of Spain from 1788 to 1808 leading up to the Peninsular War. Her relationship with Manuel Godoy and influence over the King made her unpopular among the people and aristocrats. She was rivals with the Duchess of Alba and the Duchess of Osuna. The death of her daughter-in-law Princess Maria Antonia of Naples and Sicily, whom she disliked, was said to be the result of poisoning by the Queen.

== Life ==
=== Early life ===
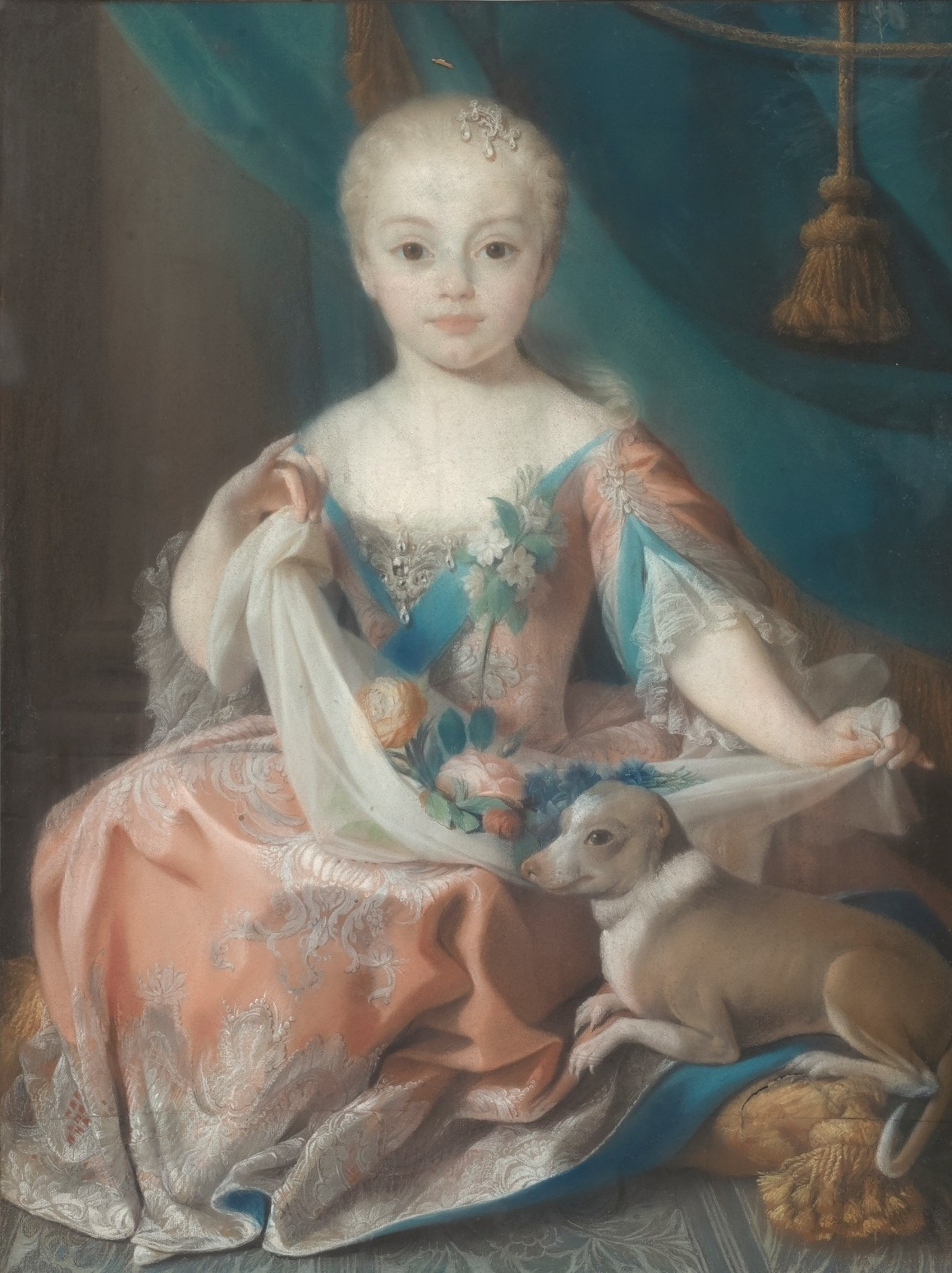
Maria Luisa as a child, by Louis-Michel van Loo.

She was the youngest daughter of Philip, Duke of Parma, the fourth son of Philip V of Spain, and Elizabeth Farnese. Born in Parma, she was christened Luisa María Teresa Anna, but is known by the short Spanish form of this name: María Luisa while Luisa was the name she used in private.

Her parents had been the Duke and Duchess of Parma since 1749, when the Treaty of Aix-la-Chapelle (1748) ceded the duchy to the Bourbons.

Maria Luisa, her brother Ferdinand and her sister Isabella are traditionally said to have been educated by Étienne Bonnot de Condillac, a well-known French philosopher. However, Condillac did in fact not arrive in Parma until 1768.

Maria Luisa was not considered as beautiful as her elder sister, but was still described as attractive, despite being short.

=== Princess of Asturias ===
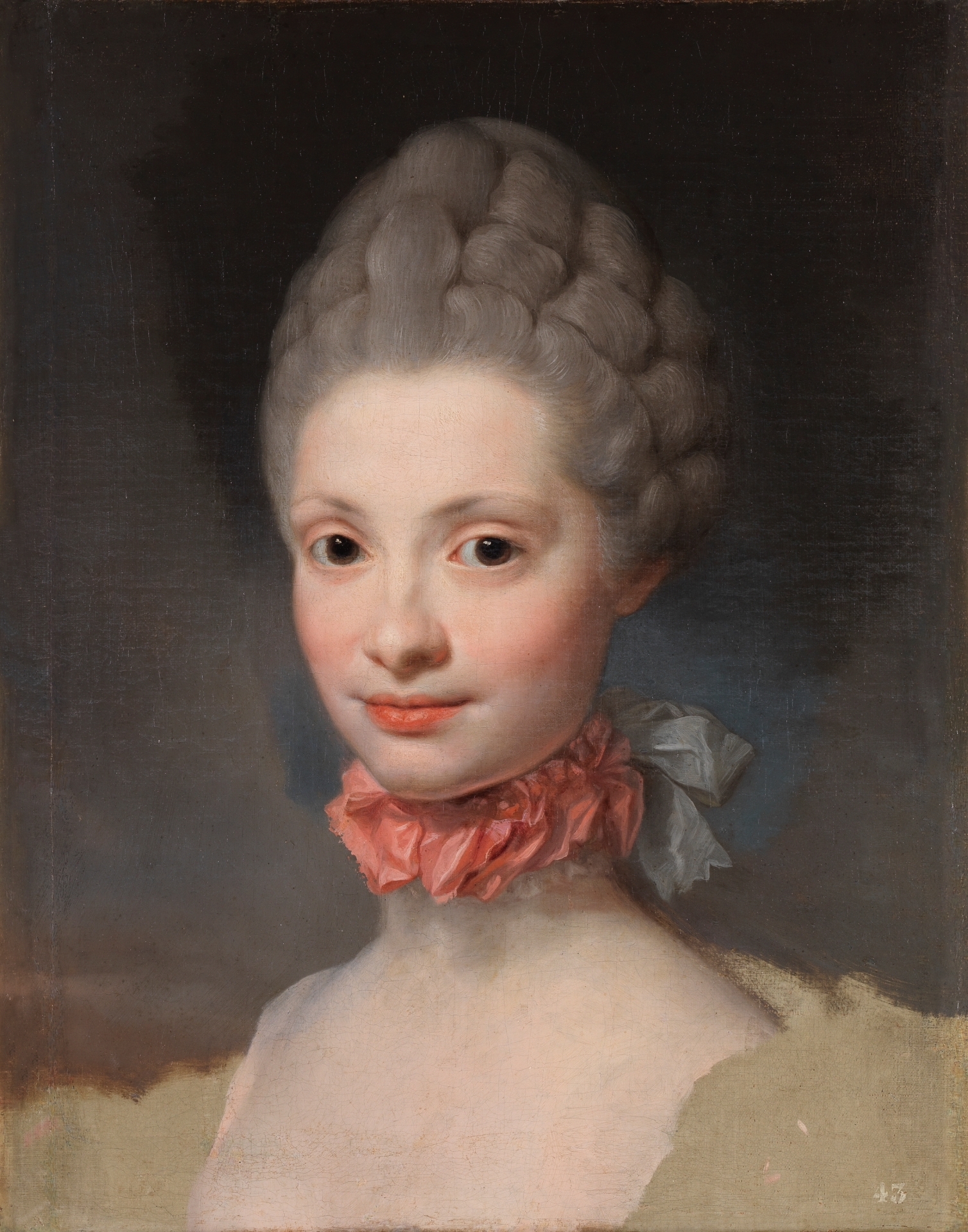
Maria Luisa of Parma by Mengs, around 1768.

María Luisa's mother tried to engage her to Louis, Duke of Burgundy, heir to the French throne. However, the young duke died in 1761. In 1762, Maria Luisa instead became engaged to her cousin Charles, Prince of Asturias, later King Charles IV of Spain. When her elder sister Isabella died in 1763, there were suggestions that Maria Luisa marry her sister's widower, Emperor Joseph II, but the proposal was refused and her engagement to the Prince of Asturias was confirmed. The wedding took place on 4 September 1765 in La Granja Palace.

Her husband was the son and heir of the widowed Charles III of Spain, previously Duke of Parma and King of Naples and Sicily. This formally gave her the title of Princess of Asturias, or crown princess. However, as there was no queen in Spain at that time, María Luisa became the first lady in precedence at the court almost from the beginning of her residence there, after the Queen Mother and former regent, Elisabeth Farnese, died a few months later.

Maria Luisa was described as intelligent, ambitious, and dominant. Regarding her appearance, she was considered to be pretty at the time of her wedding. She was known for her elegance and extravagance in fashion and jewelry. However, already by the age of thirty, she was reportedly prematurely aged and described by the Russian ambassador Zinoviev: "Repeated childbirths, indispositions and maybe some inheritable diseases has caused her to wither entirely; the yellow tone of her skin and the loss of her teeth was the final death blow to her beauty." Her father-in-law Charles III viewed her to be frivolous and attempted to control and supervise her private life and restrict her personal freedom, but with little success.

Her relationship with her husband Charles was described as a good one, but she reportedly dominated him early on. Her father-in-law took care to remove both Charles and Maria Luisa from interfering in state affairs; however, while her husband was of a passive character and devoted to his interests in hunt and mechanics, Maria Luisa was interested in state affairs and, being the dominant partner of the two, became the leading figure in the circle of opposition which gathered around the heir to the throne.

=== Queen of Spain ===
Arms of María Luisa as queen consort of Spain.

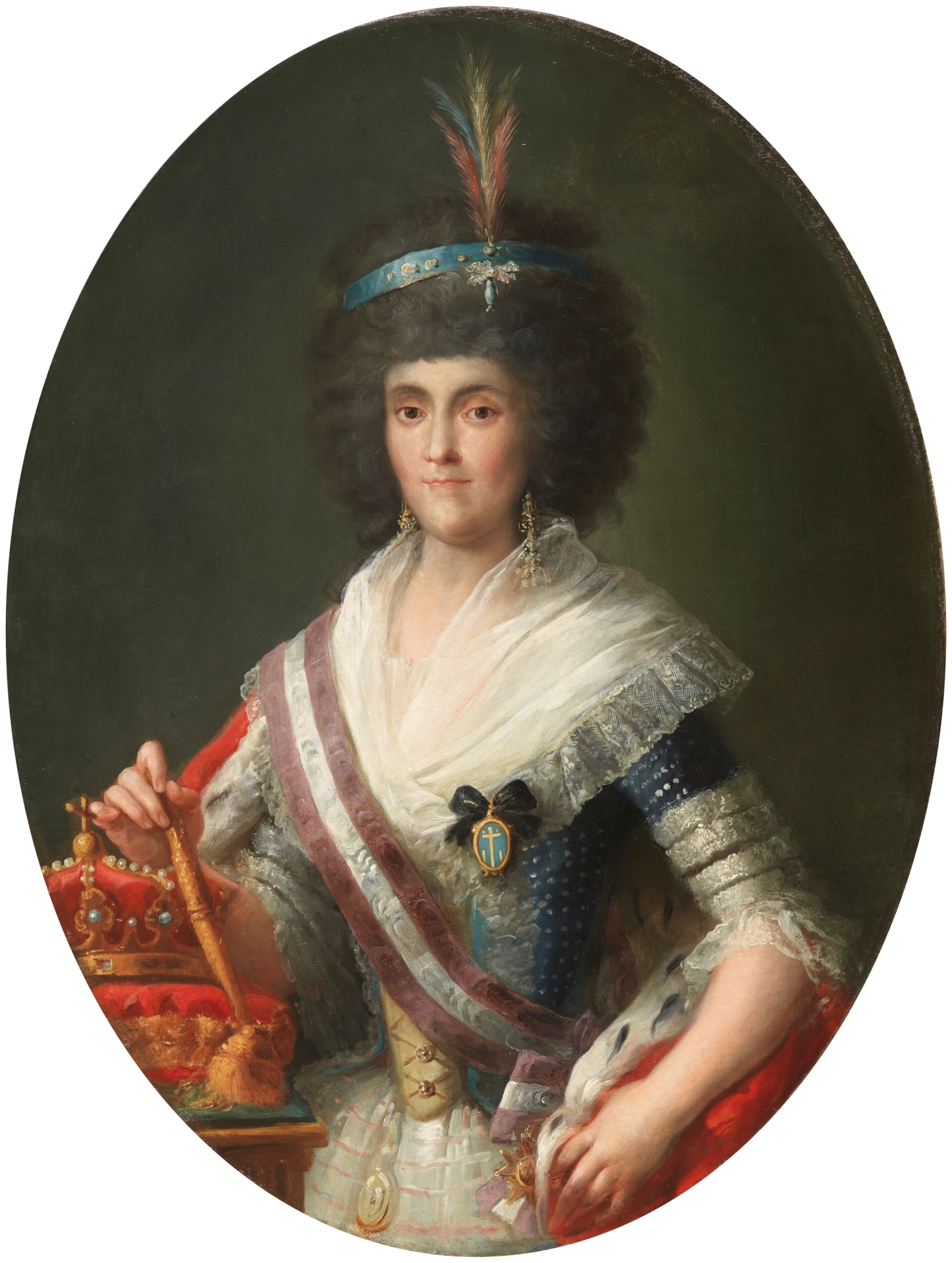
Maria Luisa as queen consort of Spain (portrait by Mariano Salvador Maella, c. 1789–92)

In 1788, her husband succeeded his father as Charles IV of Spain, making Maria Luisa queen. On the first meeting between Charles IV and his ministers, Maria Luisa was present, a step which attracted attention and which became the rule during the reign of her spouse. Maria Luisa dominated Charles IV and thus the government, but in turn reputed to be dominated by prime minister Manuel de Godoy.

María Luisa was reputed to have had many love affairs. The most infamous of them was with Godoy, whom contemporary gossip singled out as a long-time lover; in 1784 a member of the guard, he was promoted through several ranks when Charles and Maria Luisa succeeded to the throne, and was appointed prime minister in 1792. Godoy was also rumored to be the natural father of several of Luisa's children. In 1791, minister Floridablanca lost his office after accusing Godoy of being the lover of the Queen. Several other men have been pointed out as her lovers, among them her courtier Mallo.

Several contemporaries, such as the French ambassador Alquier, reported on these rumors, and they appeared in the diplomatic correspondence of the time. The truth is less clear, and these rumors may have been fabricated or exaggerated for political reasons by both the royal court and by foreign powers. The Queen's confessor Fray Juan Almaraz wrote in his last will that she admitted in articulo mortis that "none, none of her sons and daughters, none was of the legitimate marriage." The veracity of that testimony, however, remains disputed. King Charles IV never expressed any suspicions or doubt about the queen's fidelity. There is no doubt that Maria Luisa and Godoy had a close relationship regardless of the nature of it, as their correspondence illustrates that she spoke to him of such intimate matters as the discontinuation of her menstruation and the depression caused by her menopause, and was given comfort by him and assured that she would find her new state in life fulfilling as well. Aside from her purported affairs, other rumors about Luisa circulated. When the Queen's rival, the Duchess of Alba, died in 1802, she was rumored to have been poisoned by the Queen. When her son's wife, Princess Maria Antonia of Naples and Sicily, died in 1806, she was also rumored to have been poisoned by the Queen, but no real evidence has been shown to prove it.

Maria Luisa was interested in music and art, and known as a protector of artists, most notably Francisco Goya.

The Queen's purported relationship with Godoy, in combination with her reputed political influence, exposed her to the public's discontent over Godoy's Treaty with Napoleonic France, in which French troops were stationed in Spain. In one incident, the Queen was threatened by a mob and had to be protected by her life guard. In 1808, the popular discontent over the policy against France resulted in an uprising in Aranjuez.

=== Later life ===
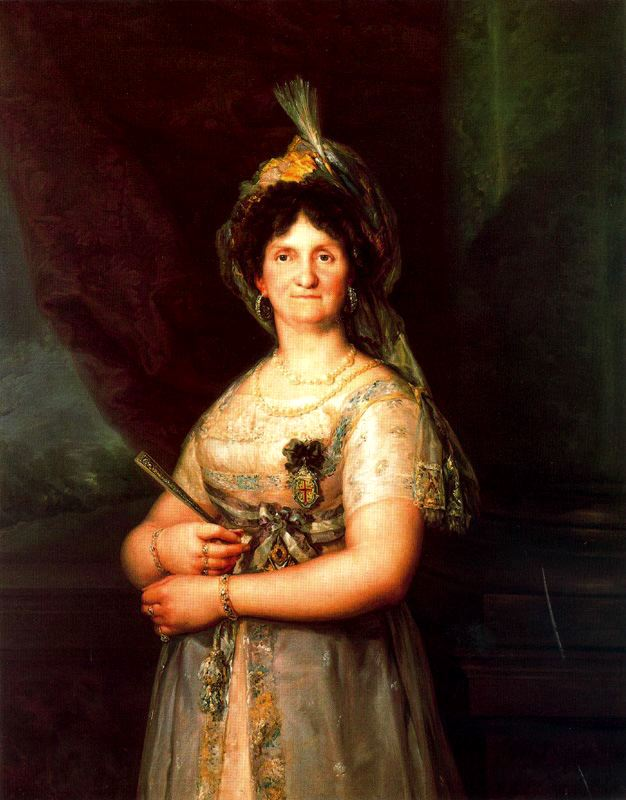
Portrait by Vicente López Portaña, 1819

On 19 March 1808, Charles IV abdicated the throne in favor of his son Ferdinand VII due to pressure from Napoleon I. In April 1808, Maria Luisa accompanied Charles IV and Manuel Godoy to a meeting with Napoleon in Bayonne, France to persuade the emperor to intercede and assist her husband in reclaiming the Spanish throne from their son. Their son Ferdinand VII also attended the meeting. At the meeting, however, Napoleon forced both Charles IV and Ferdinand VII to renounce their claims to the throne in favor of his brother Joseph Bonaparte and declared the Bourbon dynasty in Spain deposed. When Napoleon's army invaded Spain, several pamphlets blamed her for the abdication.

After the forced abdication, Maria Luisa lived with Charles IV and Manuel Godoy as state prisoners of Napoleon in France. First in Compiègne and Aix-en-Provence, they were allowed to relocate to Marseille, where they lived for four years. In 1812 they were allowed to settle under the protection of the Pope in the Barberini Palace in Rome.

After the fall of Napoleon in 1814, her son Ferdinand VII was reinstated upon the Spanish throne. However, he banned his parents as well as Godoy from returning to Spain. During Napoleon's temporary return to power in France during the Hundred Days in 1815, Maria Luisa, Charles and Godoy left for France, but after his final fall, they returned to Rome where they settled permanently.

During their residence in Rome, Maria Luisa and Charles created a large art collection of paintings by artists Titian, Correggio, Leonardo, Lucas Cranach, Andrea del Sarto, Parmigianino, Bronzino, Palma El Viejo, Tintoretto, Veronese, Poussin, Gaspar Dughet, and Alessandro Turchi. This collection was later transferred to Madrid.

Both María Luisa and her husband died in Italy in early 1819. María Luisa reportedly died of consumption. Manuel Godoy was made universal heir in her will, with the statement that he had shared their exile and lost his property for it.

== Legacy ==
In 1792, the Order of Queen Maria Luisa for women was founded on her suggestion.

=== Portrayal in film ===
Film	Year	Actress
The Naked Maja	1958	Lea Padovani
Goya or the Hard Way to Enlightenment	1971	Tatyana Lolova
Carlota Joaquina, Princess of Brazil	1995	Vera Holtz
Volavérunt	1999	Stefania Sandrelli
Goya's Ghosts	2006	Blanca Portillo

== Issue ==
Name	Portrait	Lifespan	Notes
Carlos Clemente; Infante of Spain		19 September 1771 – 7 March 1774	Born and died at El Escorial; baptized on the same day he was born, with Charles III representing "the Holy Father" at the christening. Pope Clement XIV celebrated Carlos' birth and sent the infant consecrated swaddling clothes.
Carlota Joaquina; Queen of Portugal and the Algarves		25 April 1775 – 7 January 1830	Born at the Royal Palace of Aranjuez, she married John VI of Portugal in 1785 and became Queen consort of Portugal in 1816. Had issue, including the future Pedro I of Brazil. She died at Queluz National Palace.
Maria Luisa; Infanta of Spain		11 September 1777 – 2 July 1782	Born and died at the Royal Palace of La Granja de San Ildefonso.
María Amalia; Infanta of Spain		9 January 1779 – 22 July 1798	Born at the Royal Palace of El Pardo, she married her uncle Infante Antonio Pascual of Spain in 1795. She gave birth to a stillborn son in 1798 and died shortly thereafter.
Carlos Domingo; Infante of Spain		5 March 1780 – 11 June 1783	Born at the Royal Palace of El Pardo and died at the Royal Palace of Aranjuez. After his birth, his father pardoned all of the convicts from Puerto San Julián as a sign of celebration.
Maria Luisa; Queen of Etruria; Duchess of Lucca		6 July 1782 – 13 March 1824	Born at the Royal Palace of La Granja de San Ildefonso, she married Louis I of Etruria in 1795 and had issue, including Charles II, Duke of Parma. Became Duchess of Lucca in her own right in 1817 and died in Rome in 1824 of cancer.
Carlos Francisco de Paula; Infante of Spain		5 September 1783 – 11 November 1784	Twins, born and died at the Royal Palace of La Granja de San Ildefonso. Their birth was an important event for the people of Spain and provided security for the succession, a security which was truncated with the early deaths of Carlos and Felipe.
Felipe Francisco de Paula; Infante of Spain		5 September 1783 – 18 October 1784	Twins, born and died at the Royal Palace of La Granja de San Ildefonso. Their birth was an important event for the people of Spain and provided security for the succession, a security which was truncated with the early deaths of Carlos and Felipe.
Fernando (VII); King of Spain		14 October 1784 – 29 September 1833	Born and died at El Escorial, he succeeded his father as King in 1808, but was deposed by Joseph Bonaparte one month later. Married Princess Maria Antonia of Naples and Sicily in 1802, no issue. Re-instated as King in 1813. Married Maria Isabel of Portugal in 1816, had issue. Married Maria Josepha Amalia of Saxony in 1819, no issue. Married Maria Christina of the Two Sicilies in 1829 and had issue, including the future Isabella II of Spain. Died in 1833.
Carlos María Isidro Benito; Count of Molina		29 March 1788 – 10 March 1855	Born at the Royal Palace of Aranjuez. Married Infanta Maria Francisca of Portugal in 1816 and had issue. Married Maria Teresa, Princess of Beira in 1838, no issue. First Carlist pretender to the throne of Spain as "Carlos V". Use the title "Count of Molina" between 1845 and his death in 1855.
María Isabel; Queen of the Two Sicilies		6 July 1789 – 13 September 1848	Born at the Royal Palace of Madrid, she married Francis I of the Two Sicilies in 1802 and had issue, including the future Ferdinand II of the Two Sicilies. Queen consort between 1825 and 1830, her husband's death. Died at the Palace of Portici in 1848.
Maria Teresa; Infanta of Spain		16 February 1791 – 2 November 1794	Born at the Royal Palace of Aranjuez and died at El Escorial of smallpox.
Felipe Maria; Infante of Spain		28 March 1792 – 1 March 1794	Born at the Royal Palace of Aranjuez and died at the Royal Palace of Madrid.
Francisco de Paula; Duke of Cadiz		10 March 1794 – 13 August 1865	Born at the Royal Palace of Aranjuez, he married Princess Luisa Carlotta of Naples and Sicily in 1819 and had issue. Died in Madrid in 1865.

In addition, Maria Luisa had ten other pregnancies who ended in miscarriages:

- A miscarriage of a daughter in the 4th month of pregnancy (19 December 1775).
- A miscarriage of a daughter in the 6th month of pregnancy (16 August 1776).
- A miscarriage in the 1st month of pregnancy (22 January 1778).
- A miscarriage of a son in the 4th and a half month of pregnancy (17 January 1781).
- A miscarriage in the 1st month of pregnancy (4 December 1789).
- A miscarriage in the 1st month of pregnancy (30 January 1790).
- A miscarriage in the 1st month of pregnancy (30 March 1790).
- A miscarriage of a son in the 5th and a half month of pregnancy (11 January 1793).
- A miscarriage of a son in the 4th and a half month of pregnancy (20 March 1796).
- A miscarriage in 1799.

== Ancestry ==
Ancestors of Maria Luisa of Parma

8. Louis, Dauphin of France
4. Philip V of Spain
9. Maria Anna Victoria of Bavaria
2. Philip, Duke of Parma
10. Odoardo Farnese, Hereditary Prince of Parma
5. Elisabeth Farnese
11. Dorothea Sophie of Neuburg
1. Maria Luisa of Parma
12. Louis, Duke of Burgundy
6. Louis XV of France
13. Marie Adélaïde of Savoy
3. Louise-Élisabeth of France
14. Stanisław I of Poland
7. Marie Leszczyńska
15. Katarzyna Opalińska

== See also ==
- Spanish ship Reina María Luisa (1791)

== Bibliography ==
- EPTON, Nina, The Spanish mousetrap: Napoleon and the Court of Spain (London: Macdonald, 1973).
- HILT, Douglas, The troubled trinity: Godoy and the Spanish monarchs (Tuscaloosa; London: University of Alabama Press, 1987).
- HUGUES, Robert, Goya (London: Harvill Press, 2003).
- Ursula Tamussino: Isabella von Parma. Gemahlin Josephs II. ÖBV, Wien 1989, ISBN 3-215-07068-5.
- Kendall W. Brown: Maria Luisa Teresa of Parma. In: Anne Commire (Hrsg.): Women in World History, Bd. 10 (2001), ISBN 0-7876-4069-7, S. 330f.
- Marie-Louise-Thérèse de Parma. In: Nouvelle biographie générale. Bd. 33 (1860), Sp. 668f.

Maria Luisa of Parma House of Bourbon-Parma Cadet branch of the House of Bourbon Born: 9 December 1751 Died: 2 January 1819
Spanish royalty
Vacant Title last held by Maria Amalia of Saxony	Queen consort of Spain; 1788–1808	Vacant Title next held by Julie Clary
