= Antonia de Oviedo Schöntal =

Co-founder of the Oblate Sisters of the Most Holy Redeemer

Venerable Antonia Maria de Oviedo Schöntal
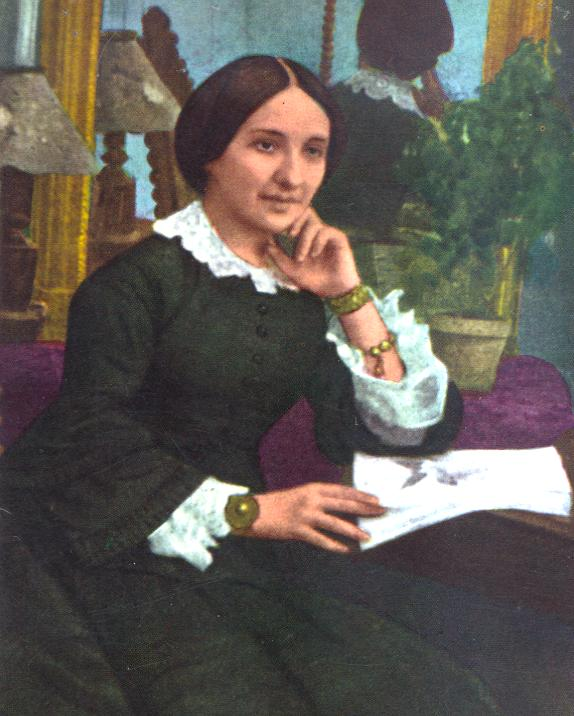
- Born: 16 March 1822; Lausanne, Vaud, Switzerland
- Died: 28 February 1898 (aged 75); Ciempozuelos, Madrid, Kingdom of Spain
- Resting place: Ciempozuelos, Madrid, Spain

Antonia Maria de Oviedo Schöntal (16 March 1822 – 28 February 1898) was a Swiss-Spanish religious sister in the Roman Catholic Church and the co-founder of the Oblate Sisters of the Most Holy Redeemer, a congregation that she established with the Benedictine Bishop José María Serra. She assumed the religious name Antonia María of Mercy and worked alongside poor and disadvantaged women.

She was declared venerable on 7 July 1962 after Pope John XXIII approved the fact that she lived a life of heroic virtue. A miracle attributed to her intercession requires papal approval after having received approval from the Congregation for the Causes of Saints in 2005.

== Life ==
Antonia Maria de Oviedo Schöntal was born on 16 March 1822 in Lausanne to the Spanish Antonio de Oviedo and the Swiss Susanna Schöntal. Antonio de Oviedo, native of Sevilla, Spain and Susana Schönthal from Lausanne, Switzerland got married on July 20, 1819. The birth of Antonia María filled with joy the home of the young couple. Few days after, she was baptized at the St. Stephen Catholic Chapel and received the names of Antonia María Victoria Juana.

At the age of 13 she made her First Communion in the Church of the Assumption in Lausanne. It was a bittersweet day due to her parents absence. Don Antonio already left for England at that time to ensure the sustenance of the family. After a long illness and accompanied by his wife, Don Antonio died in England on June 21, 1935.

The influence of Susana was crucial in Antonia's education and religious experience. Susana was a woman of sensitivity, culture, and deep faith. Antonia received in her childhood and youth a solid preparation in history, culture and geography of her small country, Switzerland. Antonia was raised by her mother. She studied in a boarding school in Fribourg, where she was praised for her knowledge, excellence in languages and behavior.

== As an educator ==
At the age of 16, the Marquis of la Romana entrusted to her the education of his 10-year-old daughter, Rosalia Caro, who later became Duchess of Medina Sidonia. Antonia, worked and lived between Geneva, Milan, and Florence for two years. At that time, due to the precarious situation of her family, she opened a boarding school for young women in Freiburg. But after six years, she was forced to close it due to the war.

After that experience, Antonia received a job offer from the Spanish ambassador in Bern, who requested her services to be the governess of the three daughters of Queen Maria Christina de Borbón from her marriage to Don Agustin Fernando Muñoz, the Duke of Riánsares. In January 1848, Antonia travelled to Madrid and lived with the royal family and dedicated herself to the education of the three princesses: Amparo, Milagros and Cristina.

For 12 years, she worked as governess to the royal children where she displayed her rich cultural background, exquisite training, special sensitivity to the arts, music, literature, languages and showed her solid faith and personal maturity. She remained in her position until 1860 when the princesses all left home following their marriages. Her departure came in October 1860 with the marriage of the last daughter: Maria Cristina Muñoz Borbón (19 April 1840 – 19 December 1921).She later moved to Rome, where she remained for two years. Her work and dedication were marked by the spirit of missionary commitment. She was then the Vice President of the apostolic work that supported foreign missions founded by Bishop Jose Benito Serra. Antonia was a woman who had experienced love with great intensity by receiving marriage proposals. But she was free to choose her future and her desire to belong to God whom she dearly loved overpowered her.

== As a writer ==
Since she was a child, she had shown interest in research and books. Between 1836 and 1855, she developed her literary facet and wrote poems, dialogues and comedies, historical and travel pieces, sea stories as well as on eucharistic, ecclesial and missionary themes, novels and autobiographical texts. The following are her literary pieces in its English translations.

=== Poems ===
- Felicitations and Acrostics (Felicitaciones y Acrósticos, Friburg, 1836-1851)
- Couplets (Coplas, Lausanne, 1844)
- Spiritual: To the cross (A la cruz, Madrid, 1850), Amen (Ciempozuelos, 1896)
- Human values: The refuge of happiness (El refugio de la felicidad, Madrid, 1852)
- Her name (Su nombre, Rome, 1861)

=== Dialogues and comedies ===
- For a prize distribution (Para una distribución de premios, Friburg, 1845)
- Goodbye (Adiós, Madrid, 1849)
- The party or The magic mirror (La fiesta o El espejo mágico, Madrid, 1850)

=== Historical and travel writings ===
- Recollections of London (Recuerdos de Londres, London, 1853)
- An excursion to Toledo (Una excursión a Toledo, Aranjuez, 1853)
- The Emperor's bench (El banco del Emperador, Aranjuez, 1853)
- Switzerland at the edge of the lake (Suiza al borde del lago, Switzerland, 1853)
- A visit to Rueil (Una visita a Rueil, La Malmaison, 1855)
- Memories of Switzerland (Recuerdos de Suiza, Switzerland, 1857–58)
- Memories and paintings (Recuerdos y cuadros, La Malmaison, 1857)

=== Marian themes ===
- A Dream (Un sueño, Friburg, 1847)
- The Immaculate Conception (La Inmaculada Concepción, La Malmaison, 1854)
- New month of Mary (Nuevo mes de María, La Malmaison, 1855)
- The Assumption (La Asunción, La Malmaison, 1857)
- The wonders of the nineteenth century (Las maravillas del siglo XIX, Madrid, 1885)

=== Eucharistic themes ===
- Month of the Blessed Sacrament (Mes del Santísimo Sacramento, La Malmaison, 1855)
- Feast of Corpus in Rueil (Fiesta del Corpus en Rueil, La Malmaison, 1855)

=== Ecclesial-missionary themes ===
- The feast of the Kings in the Propaganda School (La fiesta de los Reyes en el Colegio de Propaganda, Rome, 1858)
- Vidimus stellam (Rome, 1861)
- Christmas Party in Rome (Fiesta de Navidad en Roma, Rome, 1860)
- Miscellaneous writings on Rome (Escritos diversos sobre Roma, Rome, 1861)
- The Missionary (El Misionero, Rome, 1862)
- The field of Aníbal and the General Council of 1869 (El campo de Aníbal y el Concilio general de 1869, Ciempozuelos, 1869)
- Letter to the Pope (Carta al papa, Madrid, 1868 and 1871)

=== Novels ===
- The Rose of Magdalena (El Rosal de Magdalena, La Malmaison, 1858)
- Aurelius (Aurelio Rome, 1859)

=== Autobiographies ===
- History of a conscience (Historia de una conciencia-Bagnères de Bigorre, 1854)
- A Memory of Bliss (Un recuerdo de dicha, Parías, 1855)
- Rule of Life ( Regla de Vida, 1838)

== Death ==
In the night of February 28, 1898, Antonia Maria of Mercy at 75 years old passed away.

Her remains rest in the Chapel of the Spirituality House of the Oblate Sisters of the Most Holy Redeemer in Ciempozuelos, Madrid, Spain. After her death her fame spread even further.

== Beatification process ==
The process of beatification started in the Archdiocese of Madrid with an informative process that commenced on 23 November 1927 and concluded in 1932. Her writings received the approval of theologians on 2 August 1942 who deemed that the writings she left behind were indeed in line with the magisterium of the Christian faith. The formal introduction of the cause came on 1 February 1948, under Pope Pius XII, in which she was accorded the title of Servant of God.

An apostolic process was held in 1952 in order to continue the work of the informative process while the two processes received the validation of officials from the Congregation of Rites on 11 March 1955; this would allow for them to commence their own line of investigation into the merits of the cause.

She was proclaimed to be Venerable on 7 July 1962 after Pope John XXIII confirmed that the late religious had lived a model life of heroic virtue.

The miracle required for her beatification was investigated in Spain and received validation from the Congregation for the Causes of Saints on 26 April 1991. The medical board based in Rome approved the miracle on 24 October 2002 while theologians approved it on 15 April 2005; the C.C.S. granted their final approval on 6 December 2005.

== Bicentennial of her birth (1822-2022) ==
On March 16, 2022, the Oblate Sisters of the Most Holy Redeemer in the places where they are commemorated the Bicentennial of the birth of Mother Antonia Maria of Mercy. It kicked off with the Virtual Bicentennial Jubilee Year Celebration on March 9, 2022, the Feast of St. Joseph, that was attended by over 200 members of the Congregation and the whole Oblate Family all over the world.

As thanksgiving and remembrance of the life and legacy of Mother Antonia, this Jubilee Year was guided with the slogan "She lived what she believed. Proclaimed what she lived." The Bicentennial Commission has prepared various activities for this year until its culmination on March 16, 2021. Among these activities are the Short Video Contest "200 years with Antonia María de Oviedo" the production of film about Mother Antonia entitled, "Si Todas Las Puertas Se Cierran" (If All The Doors Are Closed).

The opening of the Bicentennial despite being virtual was celebrated in a very festive way. From Angola to the Philippines, expressions of joy of the participants were vividly seen on the screens. The Superior General of the Oblate Sisters of the Most Holy Redeemer, Lourdes Perramon Bacardit, opened the celebration with few words of welcome and thanksgiving. In her welcome address inspired by the slogan of the celebration, she pointed out three beliefs held by Mother Antonia: "Her belief in God" expressed in her living out with great depth in all the significant steps in her life of faith, "belief in the women" with a "pedagogical and evangelical perspective" that allowed her to "establish the pedagogy of love" and "belief in the project she started" and in those who, together with her and Serra, promoted that which "configured her entire life."

Marissa Cotolí, the Vice-postulator in the beatification cause of Antonia María de la Misericordia and member of the Bicentennial Commission walked through with the participants the life and works of Mother Antonia by showing some original graphic illustrations. Afterwards, the three winners of the Short Film Contest on the life and mission of Antonia were announced: the first prize went to the short entitled, "Una vida, un sueño que aún hoy se hacen realidad" (A life, a dream that still comes true today), produced by the Colegio Santísimo Redentor, in Ramos Mejia, Argentina.

The Commission received a total of 29 videos from Angola, Italy, Colombia, Brazil, Portugal, Argentina and Spain. The ten best videos can be found in the YouTube channel: Oblate Sisters – Communication.

== Film: If all the doors are closed ("Si todas las puertas se cierran”) ==
Synopsis

"If all doors are closed" tells the story of three women, apparently separated in time and space, but who end up coming together in their process of finding themselves. The three will have to listen to an inner call that requires them to face their fears and be the true protagonists of their lives, opening new paths of transformation and liberation.

== External list ==
- Hagiography Circle
