= María Muñoz =

María Muñoz may refer to:

- María Amparo Muñoz y Borbón, 1st Countess of Vista Alegre (1834–1864), 1st Countess of Vista Alegre
- María Cristina Muñoz y Borbón, Marquise of la Isabela (1840–1921), Spanish aristocrat
- María Muñoz Juan (born 1984), Spanish handballer
- María Luisa Muñoz (born 1959), Spanish long-distance runner
- María Alejandra Muñoz (born 1979), Ecuadorian politician and lawyer
- María Julia Muñoz (born 1950), Uruguayan politician
- Maria Sol Muñoz (born 1975), Ecuadorian lawyer
- María Muñoz (choreographer), Catalan dancer and choreographer
