= August Czartoryski =

Polish Roman Catholic priest

Blessed August Czartoryski SDB
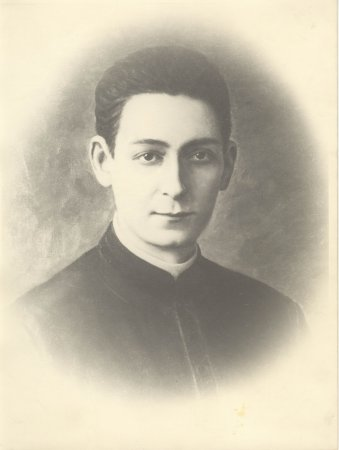
- Born: 2 August 1858; Paris, France
- Died: 8 April 1893 (aged 34); Alassio, Savona, Kingdom of Italy
- Venerated in: Roman Catholic Church
- Beatified: 25 April 2004, Saint Peter's Square, Vatican City by Pope John Paul II
- Feast: 8 April

August Franciszek Maria Anna Józef Kajetan Czartoryski, SDB, (2 August 1858 – 8 April 1893) was a Polish prince who was born in Paris during his family's exile, his constant frail health saw much of his childhood being shuttled to various health spas. Raphael Kalinowski tutored him; the prince turned to the priesthood instead of pursuing the aristocratic life.

However, his path into the Salesians was not set in stone, because Don Bosco believed his frail health would become an impediment to his ecclesial studies. Nevertheless, Bosco allowed him to undergo the novitiate after Pope Leo XIII intervened. Czartoryski was ordained a priest in 1892 and settled as a pastor in Savona where he died from tuberculosis. He was beatified on 25 April 2004.

== Life ==
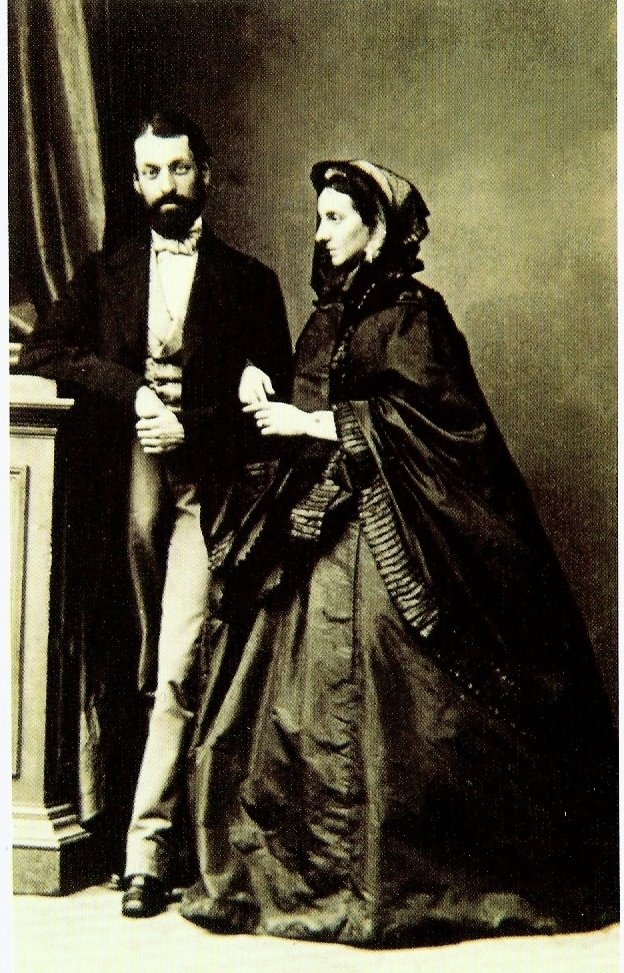
His parents c. 1860s.

August Franciszek Maria Anna Józef Kajetan Czartoryski was born in Paris on 2 August 1858 as the sole child to Prince Ladislaus Czartoryski and Princess María Amparo Muñoz. His noble household was one of the most powerful families in Poland but the Russians later exiled them to France around 1830 where the clan set themselves up at the Hôtel Lambert in Paris.

To his parents and other relatives he was known as "Gucio"; he was often frail having contracted tuberculosis from his mother in 1864 and he inherited his mother's title upon her death from the disease in 1864 and he held this until 1876 when it was made a dukedom and until his death as the first duke. Much of his life was spent being shuttled to different health spas in the mountains and along beaches that had "good air" for the afflicted and he was moved to places such as Switzerland and Spain before being sent to doctors on the Italian peninsula and later in Egypt. From 1868 until 1875 he studied in Paris and in Kraków though some of that period from 1870 saw him homeschooled due to his poor health. He had been forced – due to his status – to attend court functions and other social gatherings though had no interest in those things. In 1878 he wrote to his father to tell him that he grew wearisome from all the social engagements he had to attend and expressed his dissatisfaction with them as mere vanities. Marriage proposals were offered to him though he never gave an outright refusal out of respect even though he had been firm on never accepting such offers. He made his First Communion in 1871 at Sieniawa.

In 1872 his father remarried to Marguerite Adélaïde and had two more sons in 1872 and 1876. In 1874 his father hired the tutor Raphael Kalinowski. Kalinowski also suffered from lung ailments and accompanied the prince to some of his destinations. Kalinowski introduced him to Aloysius Gonzaga and Stanislaus Kostka. In a letter to his sister Maria the priest wrote that he served as the "father, mother, nurse, brother, companion and caretaker" for the prince. The two remained close companions until 1877 when Kalinowski joined the Discalced Carmelites. But Kalinowski – just before he left – wrote to the prince's father suggesting he would be better off in the care of a priest's direction; his father took this advice and Father Stanisław Kubowicz began to oversee his spiritual growth. In May 1883 he first met Giovanni Bosco – the founder of the Salesians – and served as his altar server when the priest celebrated Mass at the Hôtel Lambert for his relations.

His father desired that his son pursue a diplomatic career but the prince felt a different calling that was aimed towards the priesthood; Pope Leo XIII encouraged him in his vocation to join the Salesians when the two met in Rome. He had met with Bosco in 1887 asking to be admitted though Bosco was reluctant since he thought the prince's frail health would be an impediment to his ecclesial studies (he left to meet Bosco with his father's assent). But Leo XIII had intervened and convinced Bosco to allow him admittance. Once he announced his intentions to his father the latter disapproved but said he could not change the will of God and therefore his reservations were to be kept silent. He joined their ranks in Turin with the blessing of an ailing Bosco on 17 June 1887 and in his novitiate was under the care of Father Giulio Barberis; he received the cassock from Bosco himself on 24 November 1887 at the Basilica of Our Lady Help of Christians, Turin, who whispered words of encouragement to him. But his father continued to attempt to convince him to leave and reclaim his noble status but his son kept on refusing the offer. There was even one occasion when his father tried to get Cardinal Lucido Maria Parocchi to dismiss his son from the Salesians though the prince sent a letter to both expressing his commitment to God and the seriousness of the vows he had made.

The prince made his vows as a Salesian at Bosco's grave on 2 October 1888 after Bosco had died. He began his theological and philosophical studies though his health began to decline while he became close friends with Andrea Beltrami in Liguria. He received his ordination to the priesthood on 2 April 1892 from the Bishop of Ventimiglia Tommaso Reggio in San Remo and his most of relations – who discouraged his calling – refused to attend the ordination. His stepmother and stepbrother Witold Kazimierz attended the celebration. He celebrated his first Mass on 3 April. But he was reunited with his father and other relatives at Mentone on 3 May 1892 where his father reconciled with his son's decision and had expressed his happiness. He was assigned to the Salesian community and school in Alassio, but on account of his illness was largely confined to his room overlooking the boys' playground.

He died from tuberculosis during the evening on 8 April 1893 in Savona. His remains were interred in his house's mausoleum in Sieniawa after being transported to Poland though were later buried at a Salesian church in Przemyśl. One of his descendants is Jan Franciszek Czartoryski.

== Beatification ==
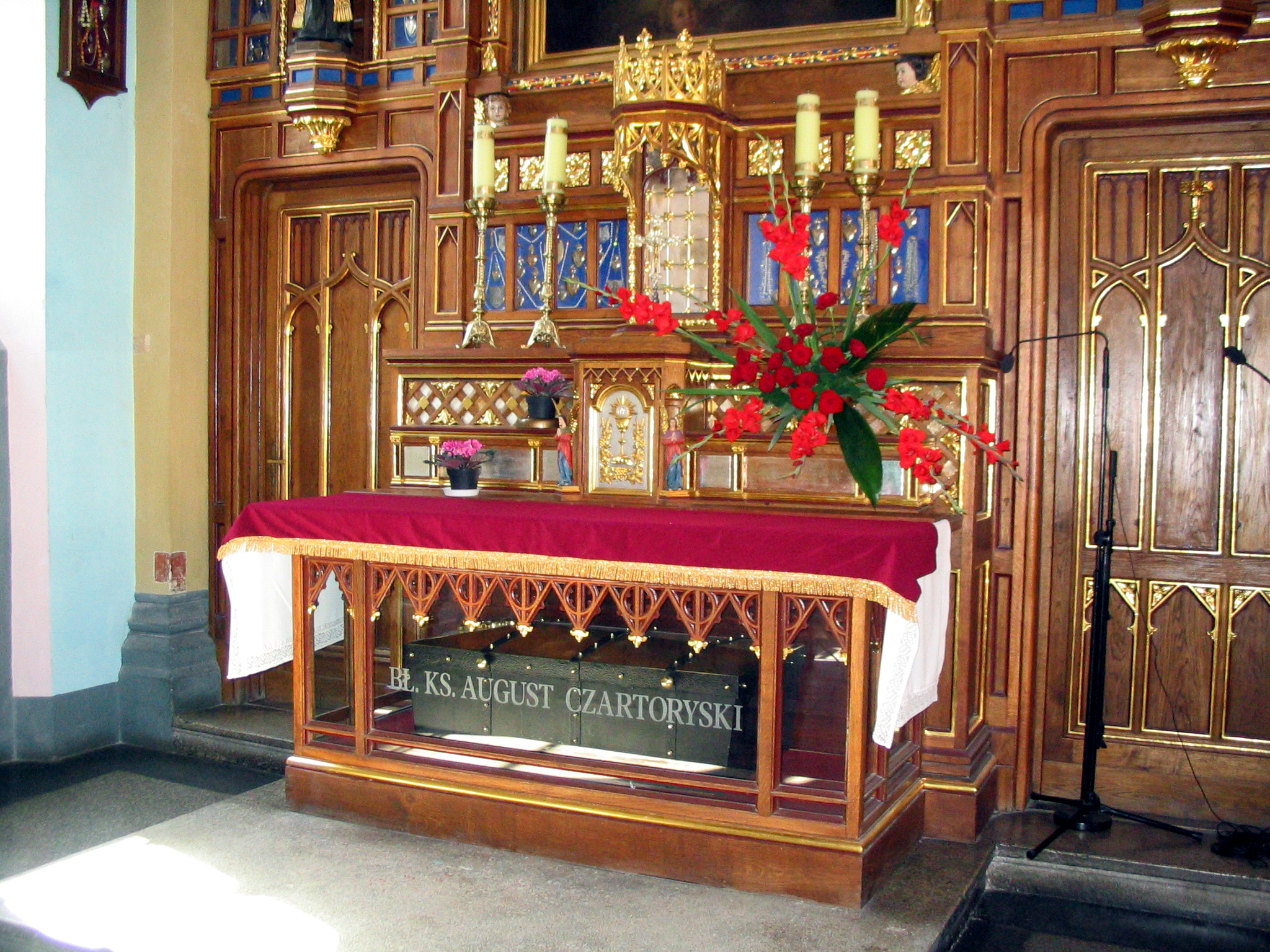
Czartoryski's tomb in Przemyśl

The beatification process commenced first in an informative process that opened in the Albenga-Imperia diocese and also the Przemyśl archdiocese from its opening on 14 February 1921 until its closure later in 1927. Theologians collected and examined his spiritual writings while approving them to be in line with doctrine on 20 September 1940. The formal introduction to the cause came on 23 March 1941 under Pope Pius XII and he became titled as a Servant of God as a result. An apostolic process was held from 1943 to 1948 while the results of both processes were sent to the Congregation for Rites who validated the aforementioned processes on 4 November 1951. The antepreparatory committee assigned to investigate the cause approved it on 11 October 1966 as did the officials and consultants of the Congregation for the Causes of Saints on 24 January 1978; the Congregation alone gave their positive verdict as well on 25 April 1978. On 1 December 1978 he became titled as venerable after Pope John Paul II confirmed that Czartoryski had lived a life of heroic virtue.

His beatification depended on the investigation and approval of a miraculous healing attributed to his intercession; one such case was investigated and sent to the Congregation who validated this process on 22 June 2001. The medical experts approved this healing on 23 January 2003 as did the consulting theologians on 2 May 2003 and the Congregation on 7 October 2003. John Paul II approved this miracle on 20 December 2003 and beatified Czartoyski on 25 April 2004 in Saint Peter's Square. The postulator for this cause is Pierluigi Cameroni SDB.

== Lineage ==
Ancestors of August Czartoryski

16. August Aleksander Czartoryski
8. Adam Kazimierz Czartoryski
17. Maria Zofia Sieniawska
4. Adam Jerzy Czartoryski
18. Georg Detlev von Flemming
9. Izabela Fleming
19. Antonina Czartoryska
2. Władysław Czartoryski
20. Józef Sapieha
10. Aleksander Antoni Sapieha
21. Teofila Jabłonowska
5. Anna Zofia Sapieha
22. Andrzej Zamoyski
11. Anna Zamoyska
23. Konstancja Czartoryska
1. August Czartoryski
24. Francisco Javier Muñoz y Carrillo de Torres
12. Juan Antonio Muñoz y Funes, Count of Retamoso
25. Eugenia Dorotea Funes y Martínez
6. Agustín Fernando Muñoz, Duke of Riánsares
26. Gabriel Antonio Sánchez y Ordóñez
13. Eusebia María Sánchez y Ortega
27. María Ortega y Campos
3. María Amparo Muñoz, Countess of Vista Alegre
28. Ferdinand I of the Two Sicilies
14. Francis I of the Two Sicilies
29. Maria Carolina of Austria
7. Maria Christina of the Two Sicilies
30. Charles IV of Spain
15. María Isabella of Spain
31. Maria Luisa of Parma

Spanish nobility
Preceded by María Amparo Muñoz	Count of Vista Alegre; 1864–1876	Countship elevated into dukedom
Countship elevated into dukedom	Duke of Vista Alegre; 1876 – 8 April 1893	Succeeded by Fernando Sánchez de Toca
