= United Kingdom of Ecuador, Peru and Bolivia =

Country proposed in 1846

Greater Ecuador Gran Ecuador (Spanish)
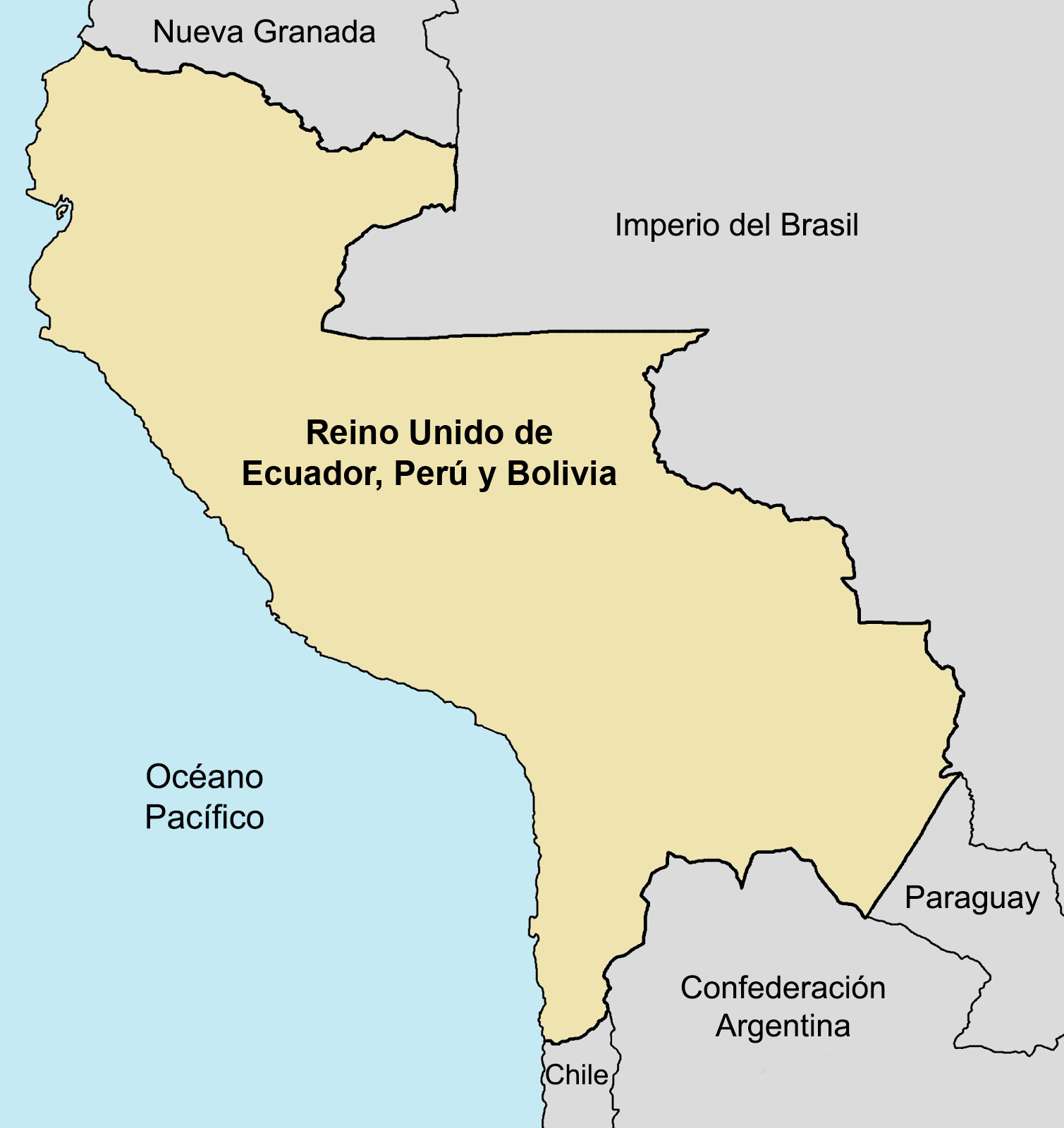
Preceded by
| Ecuador |
| Bolivia |
| Peru |
Succeeded by
| Ecuador |
| Bolivia |
| Peru |

The United Kingdom of Ecuador, Peru and Bolivia was the name given to the reconquest project proposed in 1846 by the former president of Ecuador, Juan José Flores, who was exiled in France after being dispossessed of power.

The project planned to obtain the three main territories of the Spanish Empire in the Viceroyalty of Peru – The Province of Quito (Republic of Ecuador), Viceroyalty of Peru (Peruvian Republic) and the region of Upper Peru (Republic of Bolivia).

== History ==
After being overthrown, Juan José Flores, president of Ecuador in the periods 1830–1834, 1839–1843 and 1843–1845, planned a project in 1846 to carry out a monarchical expedition. He was convinced of the ungovernability of Ecuador under a republican system and that either a dictatorship presided over by him or a monarchy could rescue the country from the civil war. Flores gathered 6,000 men in Europe to undertake an expedition with the aim of conquering Ecuador, establishing a monarchy there presided over by a European prince with a throne in Quito, and subsequently expanding the new kingdom, absorbing the republics of Peru and Bolivia to form the "United Kingdom of Ecuador, Peru and Bolivia".

He contacted his friend and former companion in the independence struggles, the Irish general Richard Wright, who was in England as a former Ecuadorian ambassador. He was given the task of recruiting 1,200 men, obtaining weapons and acquiring three ships of war to proceed to invade and conquer Ecuador. He also contacted José Joaquín de Mora, General Andrés de Santa Cruz's agent in Europe, to intercede for the cause with Minister Palmerston, who had just taken charge of the British Foreign office for the second time. Santa Cruz at that time was also in exile, after having established the Peru-Bolivian Confederation, which had been dissolved in 1839; however, he did not give up on his dream of restoring his Confederation because his main adversary, the Chilean president Manuel Bulnes, remained alert to the incursions and plans of Santa Cruz, which he reported to the Argentine government of Juan Manuel de Rosas.

It is also highly suspected that Generals Flores and Santa Cruz are united in the enterprise, and that there is an attempt to revive, in one form or another, perhaps monarchical, the old Peru-Bolivia Confederation. Letter from Manuel Bulnes (president of Chile) to Juan Manuel de Rosas (in charge of the Argentine Confederation).

Flores' project received the support and financing of the former regent of the Kingdom of Spain, María Cristina de Borbón-Dos Sicilias, exiled in France, where she met Flores, so it was established that the candidate for king of this new kingdom would be Agustín Muñoz y Borbón, whom she called prince of Ecuador and restorer of the monarchy in Peru and Bolivia, son of María Cristina de Borrbón and her second husband, Agustín Muñoz, whom she had known as a simple bodyguard after the death of Ferdinand VII of Spain. Likewise, there are other documents by which it is presumed that King Louis Philippe I of France may also have been financially involved in this project, as María Cristina de Borbón had done, to place her son Antonio de Borbón on the South American throne. Orleans and Luisa Fernanda de Borbón, who had just gotten married.

On August 7, 1846, the Madrid newspaper El Clamor Público made the news of the Florean-Bourbon monarchist expedition project to Ecuador known. By October 20, the growing opposition of British public opinion that joined the efforts of the Latin American delegations in that country intensified with the formal protest of more than thirty commercial houses led by Baring Brothers, who saw in the General Flores' project a threat to English economic interests, as Peruvian Minister Iturregui had previously stated.

This situation forced Palmerston to confiscate General Flores' ships, which were anchored in the East India Company Dock in London, through customs officials, invoking the Foreign Recruitment Act. He initiated a lawsuit against those responsible for the company, while at the same time, the mayor of Limerick in Ireland took charge of stopping the recruitment that was carried out in that town.

This whole situation causes Flores, who was in Paris, to go to England to defend himself and obtain the return of his ships. Faced with the possibility of being involved in the trial, he tried to return to Spain via Paris. In Spain, Joaquín José de Osma published in the newspapers of the Iberian capital the news of the embargo, which, added to other reasons, forced the cabinet of Francisco Javier de Istúriz, who had supported him, to dismiss him. The new government, headed by the VIII Duke consort of Sotomayor, reversed the deposit of soldiers who were ready for the attempt in the port of Santander. Flores remained for several months in Europe, trying to recover her ships with the support of the former regent, María Cristina de Borbón, who wanted to recover part of her investment.

=== Plan ===
Although most diplomatic records point to Agustín María Muñoz, son of María Cristina de Borbón's second marriage to the Duke of Riánsares, as a possible candidate for the throne of Ecuador, there is evidence that suggests that King Luis Felipe I of France may also have been involved in this scheme, using her own money, like that of María Cristina de Borbón, to establish the leadership of South America for her children: Antonio de Orleans and Luisa Fernanda de Borbón.

=== End ===
The French government denied any participation or support for the Spanish conquest of Ecuador, and the attempt by General Flores and the former queen regent of Spain was frustrated.
