= Duke of Riánsares =

- Creation date: 23 June 1844
- Created by: Isabella II
- Peerage: Spanish nobility
- First holder: Agustín Fernando Muñoz y Sánchez, 1st Duke of Riánsares
- Present holder: María de la Consolación Muñoz y Santa Marina, 6th Duchess of Riánsares
- Remainder to: heirs of the body of the grantee according to absolute primogeniture
- Subsidiary titles: Marquess of San Agustín
- Status: Extant

Duke of Riánsares (Spanish: Duque de Riánsares) is a hereditary title of Spanish nobility, accompanied by the dignity of Grandee. It was created on 23 June 1844 by Queen Isabella II in favor of Agustín Fernando Muñoz y Sánchez, second husband of the Queen Mother, Maria Christina of the Two Sicilies.

== Name ==
The name refers both to the Riánsares River, which runs near the town of Tarancón in the province of Cuenca, where the grantee was from, and to the Virgin of Riánsares, patron saint of said town of which the Queen Mother was very devoted.

== Dukes of Riánsares ==
1. Agustín Fernando Muñoz y Sánchez, 1st Duke of Riánsares (1844–1873)
2. Fernando María Muñoz y Borbón, 2nd Duke of Riánsares (1876–1910)
3. Fernando Muñoz y Bernaldo de Quirós, 3rd Duke of Riánsares (1911–1913)
4. Fernando Muñoz y Canga-Argüelles, 4th Duke of Riánsares (1917–1925)
5. José Bernardo Muñoz y Acebal, 5th Duke of Riánsares (1954–2008)
6. María de la Consolación Muñoz y Santa Marina, 6th Duchess of Riánsares (since 2009)

== Line of succession ==
- Agustín Fernando Muñoz y Sánchez, 1st Duke of Riánsares, 1st Marquess of San Agustín (1808–1842)
  - Fernando María Muñoz y Borbón, 2nd Duke of Riánsares and of Tarancón, 2nd Marquess of San Agustín, 1st Count of Casa Muñoz, 1st Viscount of Alborada, 2nd Viscount of Rostrollano (1838–1910)
    - Fernando Muñoz y Bernaldo de Quirós, 3rd Duke of Riánsares, 3rd Marquess of San Agustín, 3rd Viscount of Rostrollano (1864–1913)
      - Fernando Muñoz y Canga-Argüelles, 4th Duke of Riánsares, 3rd Marquess of San Agustín (1894–1925)
      - Juan Muñoz y Canga-Argüelles, 4th Marquess of San Agustín (1897–1970)
        - José Bernardo Muñoz y Acebal, 5th Duke of Riánsares, 5th Marquess of San Agustín (1923–2008)
          - María de la Consolación Muñoz y Santa Marina, 6th Duchess of Riánsares, 6th Marchioness of San Agustín, 2nd Marchioness of Castillejo, 2nd Viscountess of Arboleda (b. 1948)
            - (1). María Cristina de las Alas-Pumariño y Muñoz, 3nd Marchioness of Castillejo, 6th Viscountess of Rostrollano (b. 1982)
