= Spanish succession issue of 1789 =

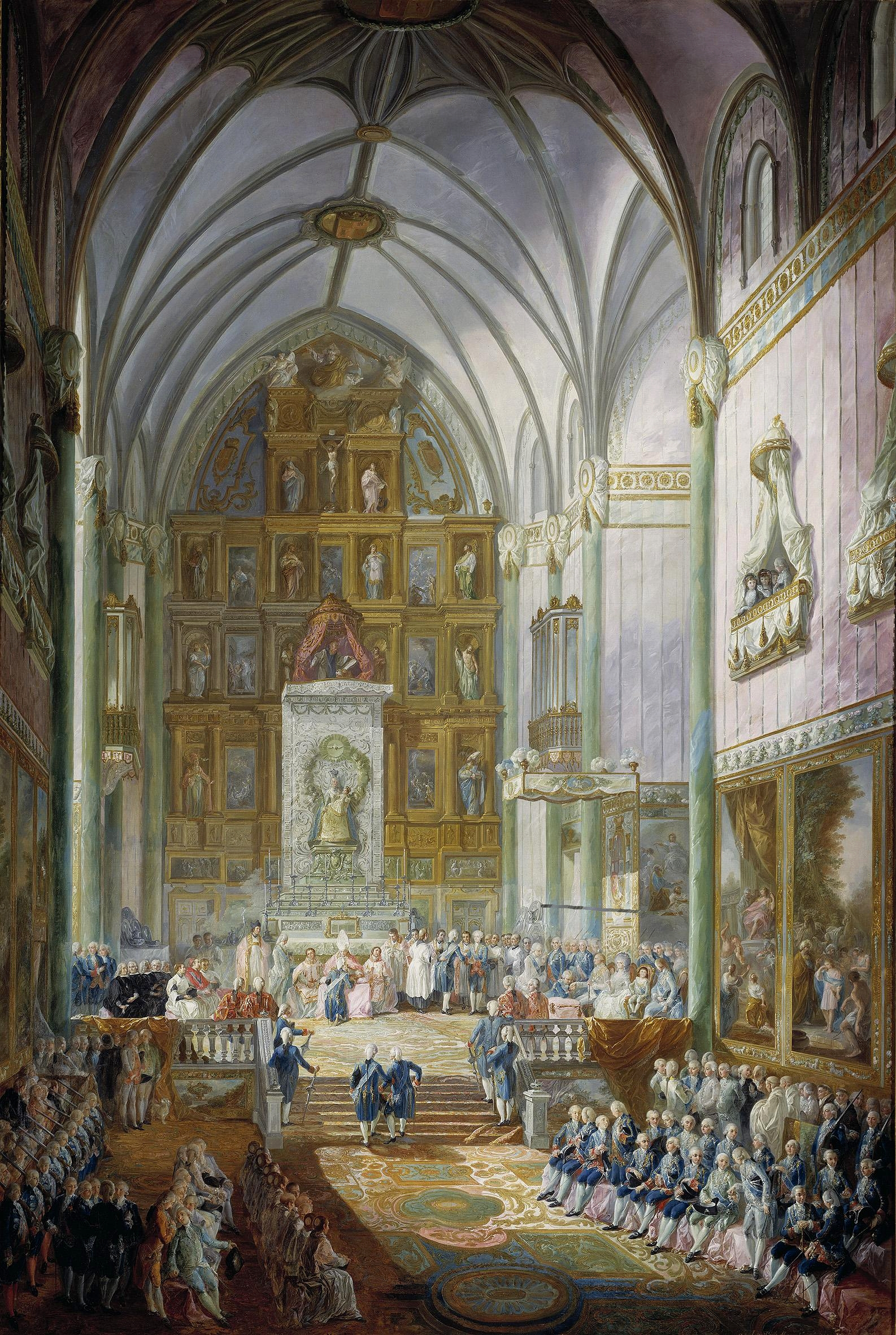
Cortes swearing allegiance to prince Fernando, Madrid 1789

The Spanish succession issue of 1789 was a series of debates and decisions, taking place and adopted prior, during, and after the Cortes sittings. They were initiated by King Carlos IV, who had suggested that the succession law in force be altered to give preference to females of main descendant lines over males of collateral lines. The proposal was accepted and formally adopted as the Cortes' petition to the king. However, a corresponding law was not published until 1830, triggering both a dynastical conflict and a series of civil wars known as the Carlist Wars. Whether the succession law was effectively changed in 1789 became a heated juridical, historical, and political debate which continued well into the 20th century. In current historiography it is usually considered of secondary importance and dealt with in highly ambiguous terms.

== Background ==
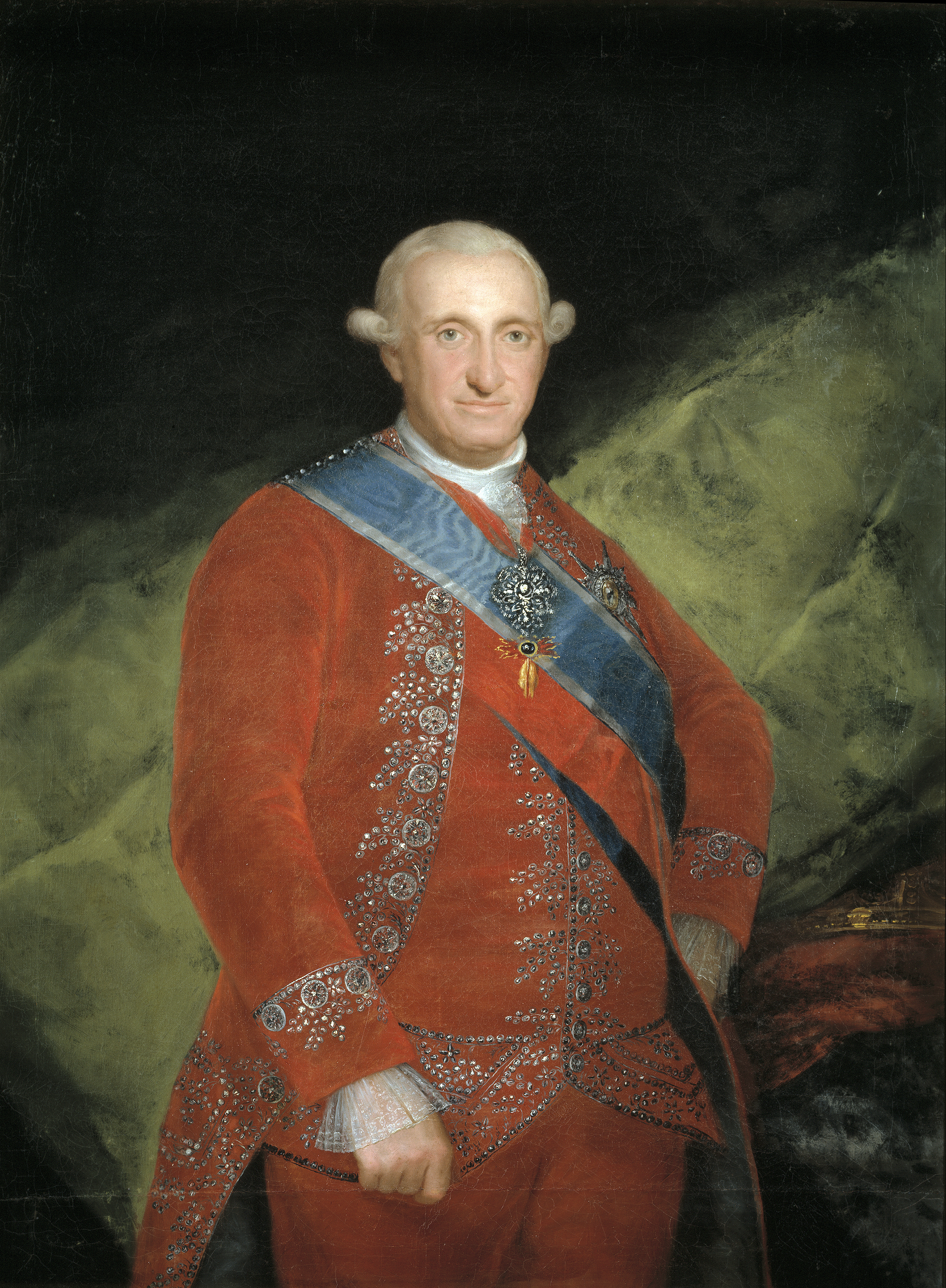
Carlos IV

Carlos IV ascended to the throne of Spain in December 1788 under the existing succession rules. In May 1789, he issued circular letters calling for the convening of the Cortes. The primary objective of the Cortes was to swear an oath of allegiance to the heir to the throne, Prince Fernando, at the time five years old and the elder of the two living sons of Carlos IV. The procedure was completely routine. The absolutist Bourbon rule even stripped the Cortes of its fiscal prerogatives. The formality of taking oath to the heir was the principal reason for the very limited number of meetings held by the diet in the 18th century. However, the circulars also urged the deputies, at that time called procuradores, to be provided with sufficient powers to discuss and decide on unspecified other matters, were such to be proposed.

In the late 18th century, the Spanish Cortes Generales consisted of 70-odd members, delegated according to different local procedures, including elections, by councils of municipalities entitled to representation. The deputies started to arrive in Madrid in the summer, but the diet formally met for the first time only on September 19, 1789. The deputies were addressed by the king, who confirmed the principal objective of the convocation, adding also that they would "treat and conclude other matters". Once the king had withdrawn, the president of the Cortes, Count of Campomanes, informed the gathering that the Cortes would remain open also after the ceremony of taking oath. The purpose of this was specified vaguely as "to take measures respecting the Law of Succession".

The procuradores gathered again on September 23, when the pompous and solemn ceremony of swearing allegiance to Prince Fernando took place as planned in the church of San Gerónimo in Madrid. Another week passed as deputies attended various religious or royal feasts without the Cortes having been convened. However, at least once, on September 28, the king met with Campomanes and the Count of Floridablanca, head of the Junta Suprema de Estado and effectively the prime minister of Spain. The three discussed disturbing news about ongoing events in France. Still, they also pondered planned changes to the law of succession, apparently an issue that had already been discussed earlier. The king, the prime minister, and the Cortes president decided to launch the procedure of altering the succession regulations at the first Cortes session; they also agreed that it must be kept secret.

== September 30, 1789: succession law proceeded ==
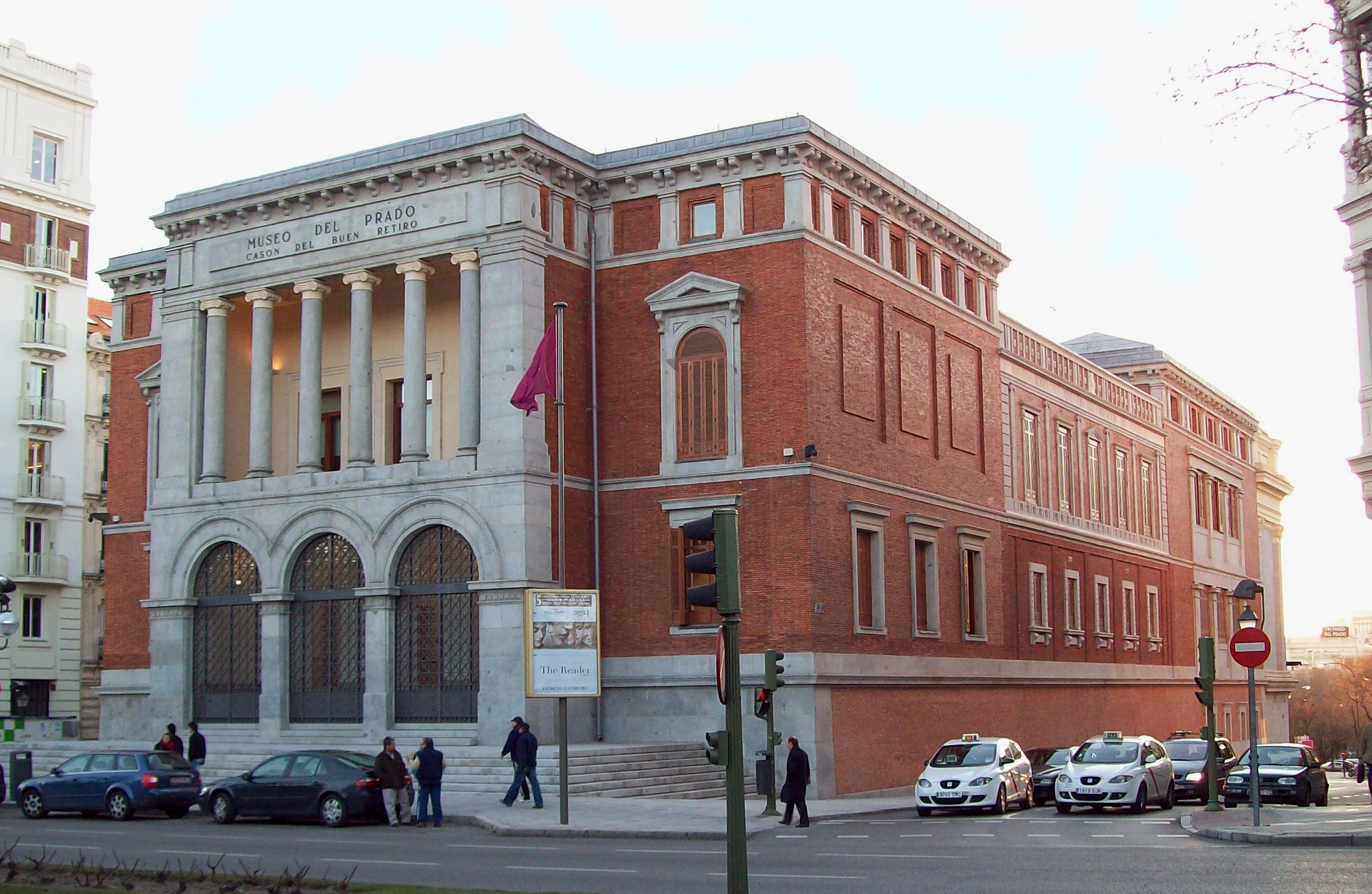
Buen Retiro palace

The deputies formally met again in the Sala de los Reinos of the Buen Retiro palace on September 30, early or late morning. With one minor exception, which did not affect the legality of the proceedings, all deputies entitled were present. The president informed the gathering that the king expected them to take a strict oath of secrecy before the start of the proceedings. The pre-prepared text was read by the president. It specified that all convened would agree to never disclose anything discussed at the meeting unless permitted to do so by the king or the president. The deputies acknowledged this with a collegial "amen". None of the sources consulted specifies whether the secret mode of proceeding was exceptional, unusual, or customary in the Cortes of that time.

The president subsequently read to the chamber a text of royal proposal. Its essence was that the 1713 succession regulations, which barred females from inheriting the throne save for extraordinary circumstances, be replaced with the previous Spanish medieval rules, which in terms of succession did not discriminate between the sexes. The text noted that the 1713 rules had been born out of circumstances which no longer existed, that they were incompatible with traditional Spanish customs, and that they had resulted in numerous conflicts, having been a threat to peace. The proposal was then followed by the reading out of a pre-prepared draft of a petition, to be adopted by the Cortes and directed to the king. Its 2-paragraph text was relatively brief; it proposed that the king order the publication of a law ordaining that "Law 2, Title 15, Partida 2" be observed notwithstanding the changes introduced in the later "Law 5, Title 7, Book 5". The former, known as Ley de Partida, was the succession law of medieval statutory code; the latter was the 1713 regulation which established new succession rules upon the Bourbon assumption of the Spanish throne, usually referred to as the "Semi-salic law" or "Salic law".

There is no information on whether the proposal of such a fundamental change shocked the deputies, merely surprised them, or whether it was anticipated and caused no excitement at all. The only record available states that the next to speak was Marqués de Villacampo, as the Burgos deputy traditionally speaking for the chamber; in the name of the house, he expressed concurrence. The petition was then signed by all deputies and placed in the hands of Campomanes for further proceedings. The gathering briefly discussed a number of other minor unrelated issues, and around 12 AM the session was closed. According to a present-day historian, the debate on succession lasted "a matter of minutes".

== October 1789: further proceedings ==
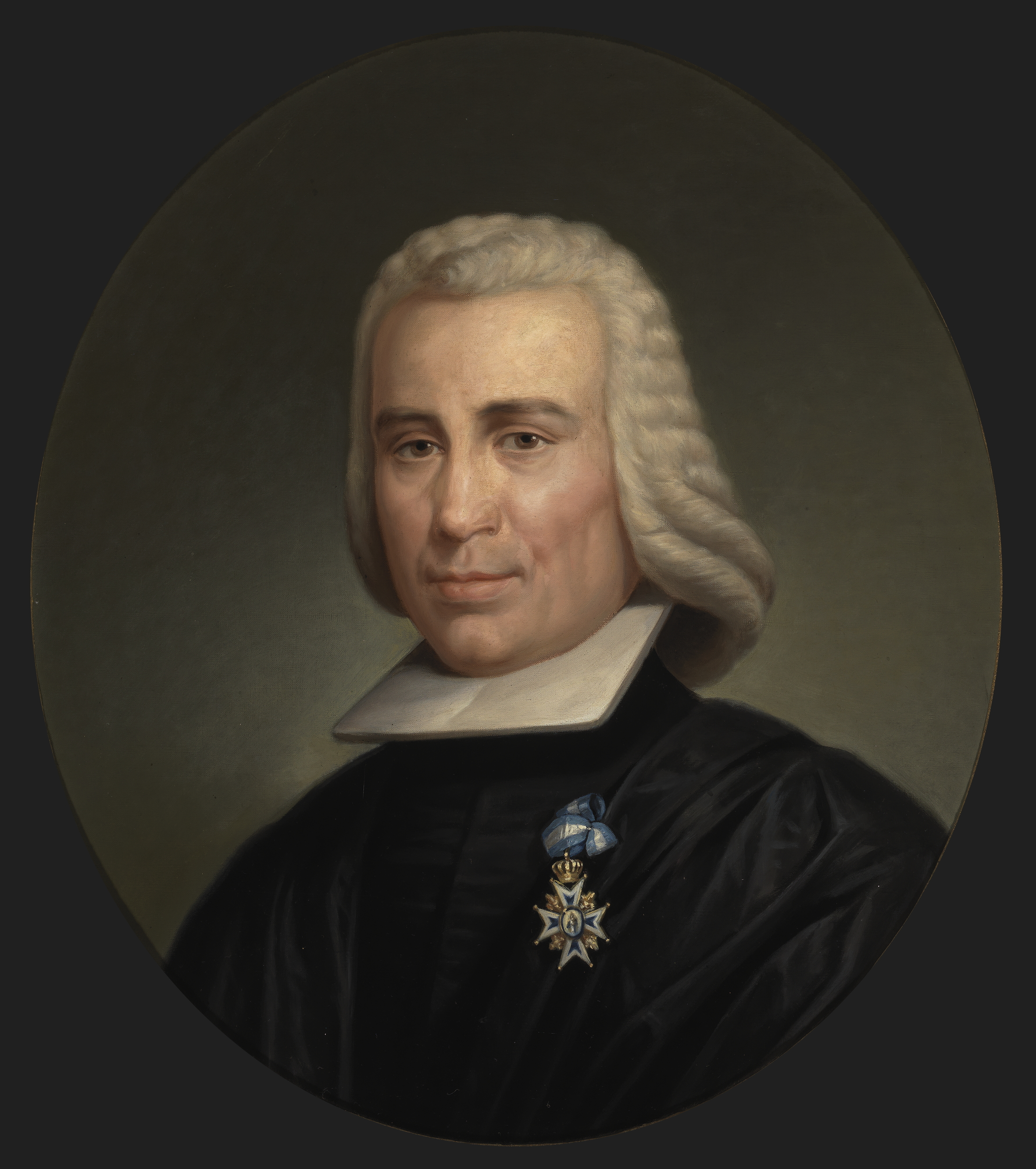
Conde de Campomanes

The Cortes met again on October 3, 1789, at which point the record of the September 30 proceedings was read and agreed to. There is no information on any discussion or difference of opinions. Four days later, on October 7, 1789, the Cortes petition was inspected by the Catholic hierarchs, gathered earlier to attend the ceremony of taking oath. In the presence of Conde de Floridablanca, 14 bishops and archbishops acknowledged the proposal with their own document, which fully endorsed the changes suggested and recommended that the "original and natural order" be re-established.

At an unknown date in October, the petition was also reviewed at one or few meetings of a body named Junta de Asistentes de Cortes, serving as a board providing non-binding legal opinion. In a separate address to the king, dated October 30, 1789, the Junta fully endorsed the Cortes proposal. The address was then acknowledged with written royal assent, also dated October 30, declaring the resolution to "correspond to the accompanying petition" and enjoining that greatest secrecy be observed.

Following the October 3 session, the diet met on five other dates, always discussing issues unrelated to the succession question. The agenda was dominated by issues concerning the agrarian regime, principally the huge landholdings, named mayorazgos, their fiscal obligations and hereditary rules. Some authors claim that as the news of the events unfolding in Paris reached Madrid, fearing unrest Campomanes dissolved the Cortes on October 17, ending it abruptly. Detailed studies by other authors claim that the Cortes proceedings went on as planned.

On October 31, 1789 the chamber met again. During the sitting the president informed the deputies that the king had answered all petitions sent to him. As to the succession issue, the procuradores were informed that the original petition had been appended to the royal resolution, stating that "I will ordain those of my Council to issue the Pragmatic Sanction which in such cases is expedient and customary, bearing in mind your petition and the opinions thereof taken". During the same meeting of October 31 the deputies once again acknowledged the king's special injunction, pledged to observe it, and formally renewed their oath of secrecy. The written record of the session notes also that they expressed the wish for the succession law to be secured in substance and in manner "until the publication of the Pragmática takes place, at such time as H. M. might think proper". That same day Campomanes announced the king's intention to dissolve the Cortes on November 5. The meeting was terminated and the deputies re-convened as planned 6 days later, when in presence of the king the Cortes was formally dissolved as "having met its objectives".

== Aftermath ==
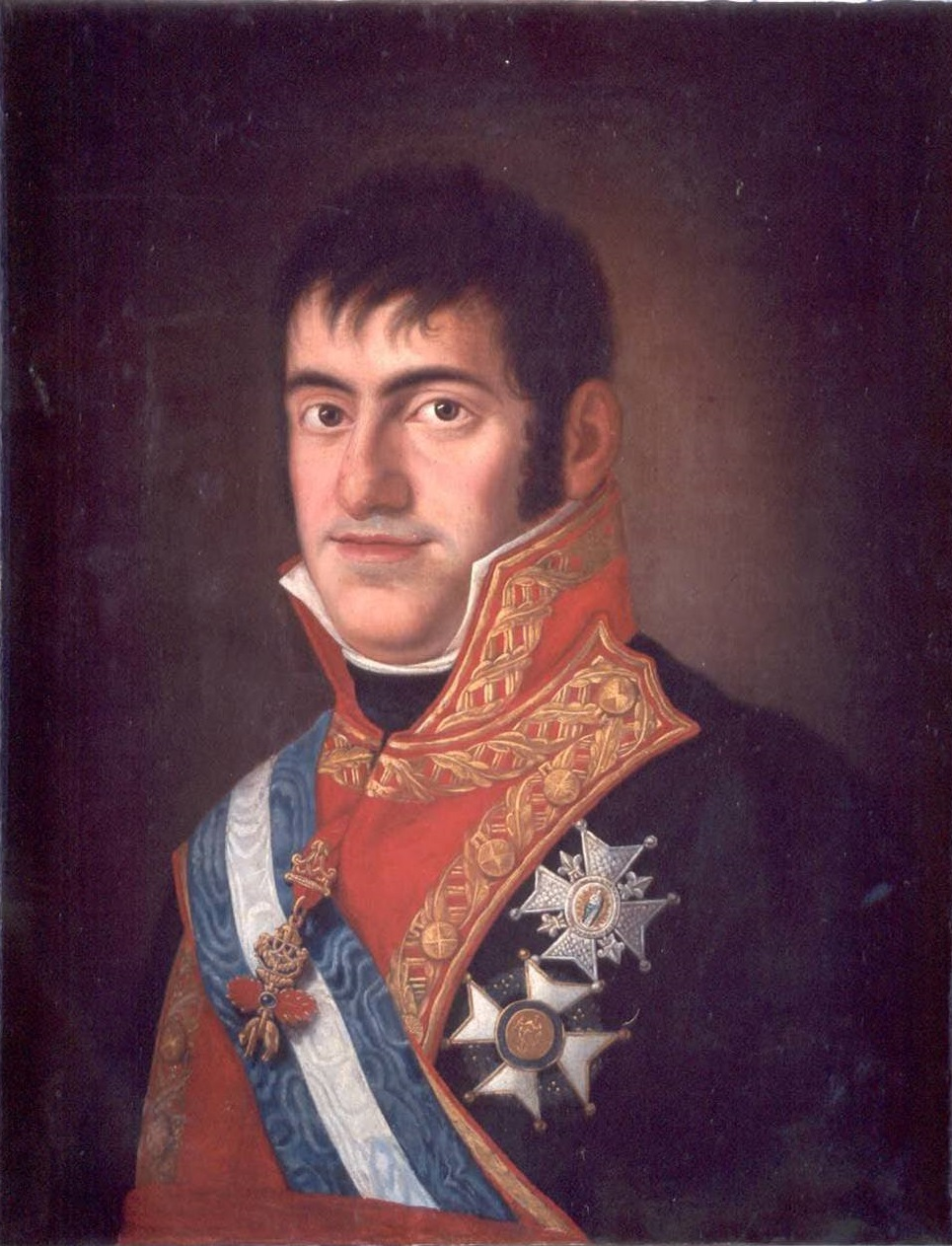
Fernando VII

According to routine legislative procedure, once a law was approved, it was made public by ordering the printing of an appropriate document. In this case, however, no law on changing succession rules was published, be it as Ley Fundamental, Pragmática Sanción, Auto Acordado, or in any other format. The periodical re-edition of an updated set of key legislation, published in 1805, known as Novisima Recopilación and confirmed by Carlos IV, referred, in terms of succession to the throne, to the 1713 rule and contained no information on any alteration. Upon Carlos IV's forced abdication in 1808, the throne was assumed by his son, Fernando VII; as he had no issue, no ceremony similar to the 1789 taking-of-oath took place. The revolutionary Constitution of Cádiz, issued in 1812, did not discriminate between the sexes in terms of royal hereditary rights; it contained no reference to the 1789 Cortes, although the Junta Suprema of the Cádiz gathering was aware of its proceedings. Once Fernando VII returned to power in 1813 the pre-revolutionary status quo ante was restored, though with no specific reference to succession law. The deposed Carlos IV died in 1819. As Fernando VII turned 40 and still had no issue, in the 1820s it was widely understood that if he were to die without a male heir, the throne would pass to his younger brother, Don Carlos. No participants of the 1789 Cortes were still alive when on March 29, 1830, Fernando VII issued a document styled as the publication of the 1789 succession law.

The 1830 document briefly referred to the events of 1789, noting that turbulent times had prevented the "execution of those important designs". It also claimed that with peace and tranquillity fully restored, the "Pragmática-sanción" of 1789 was now being published and promulgated. The document, also named "Pragmática Sanción", was published along a few others, signed by the Minister of Justice. Certified as based on original documentation stored in the ministry archive, they detailed the events of 1789. Until today they remain the key, if not only, source on the succession debate during the Cortes of Charles IV.

The 1830 regulation also designated a would-be daughter of Fernando VII as a potential heir to the throne. At the moment of its publication, the document seemed pointless as the king had no children and the throne was expected to pass on to Don Carlos anyway. However, in May 1830, it was announced that the Queen was pregnant, and in October 1830 she gave birth to a daughter. At this point, the 1830 document would have relegated Don Carlos to the second-in-succession. However, he refused to recognize its legality and a dynastic crisis ensued. As it overlapped with political conflict between pro-liberal and anti-liberal groupings, the crisis developed into an open conflict, resulting in a series of civil wars that rocked the country for some time, and lingered until the 20th century.

== Was the 1713 law changed? ==
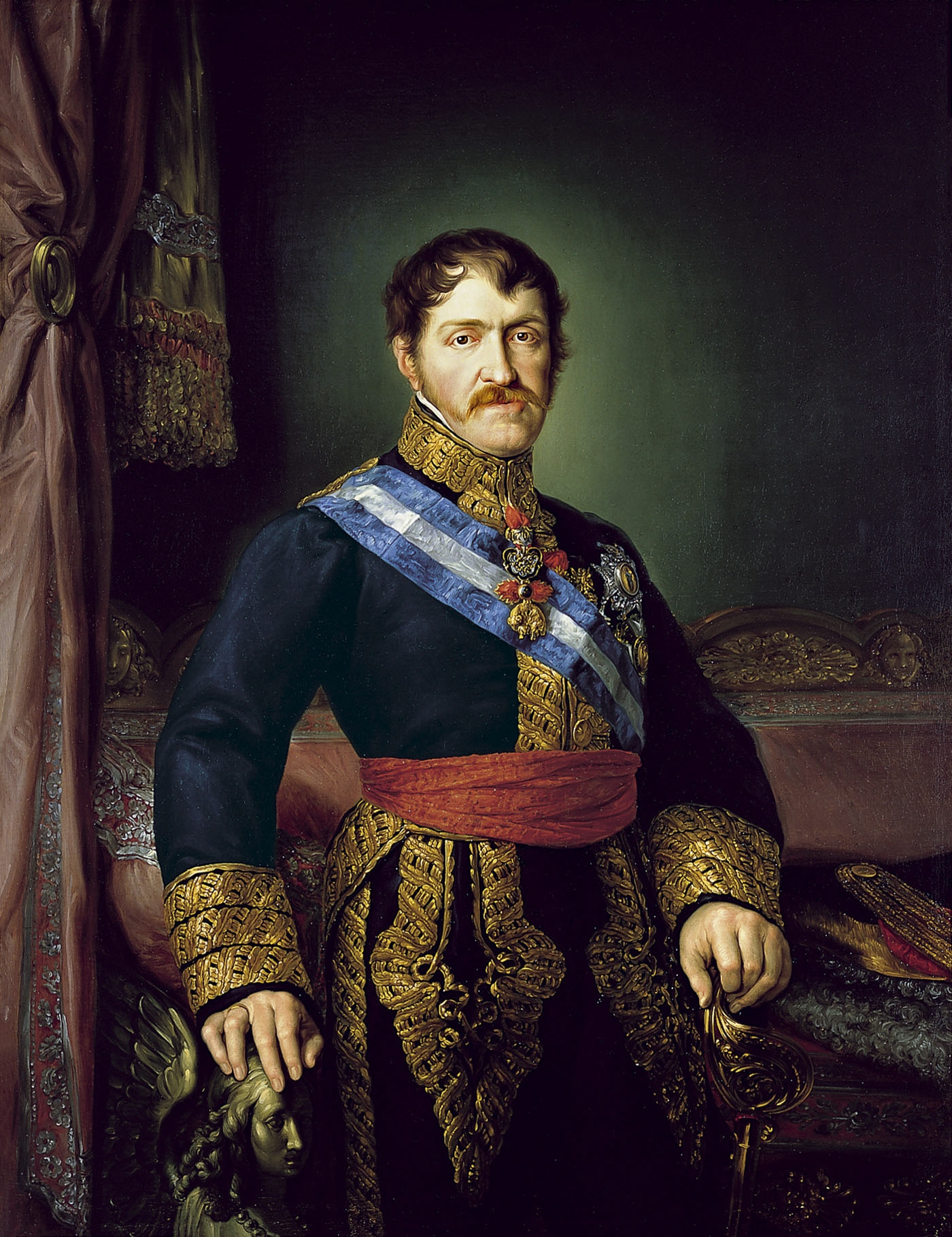
Don Carlos

After the proceedings of the 1789 Cortes had been kept almost completely under wraps for a generation, starting in the 1830s they turned into the point of an extremely heated political, juridical, and historical debate. The question of what had been decided, and more specifically whether the 1789 Cortes had abrogated the 1713 succession law, became perhaps the most controversial constitutional issue in 19th century Spain. In the 1830s "rivers of ink" were spilled over the problem, taking the shape of countless booklets, leaflets, and press articles, arguing either that the 1713 law had been changed in 1789 or that it had not. The debate continued over the following decades, reaching another climax in the late 1860s and early 1870s. From the 1880s the question was eclipsed by a number of ongoing juridical disputes, and transitioned from being a legal issue to being a historical one. However, debates persisted well into the 20th century, animated mostly by the longevity of Carlism.

The opinion that the 1789 Cortes did not alter the 1713 regulations would seem to support the dynastic claims of Don Carlos and his followers; hence, scholars holding that opinion usually either self-identified or are labeled as Carlists. They advance a host of arguments which they claim prove their point. The key one is that as the 1789 accord between the Cortes and the king was not formally issued as a law, it never entered into force. Other arguments, some of them contradictory, include the contentions that the deputies were not legally qualified to discuss the issue as they lacked a so-called mandato imperativo; that Campomanes abused the will of Carlos IV; that according to the lex retro non agit rule the law could have not affected Don Carlos, who was already one year old in 1789; that the proceedings would have been legal prior to, but not after the swearing of allegiance to Prince Fernando; that Carlos IV never formally endorsed the Cortes petition; that there is no such thing as "secret laws"; that the Novisima Recopilación of 1805 confirmed the binding legal status of the 1713 regulations; that the 1789 draft could have been declared law until 1808 but not later, as the Cortes entitled only Carlos IV, and not his successors, to make it binding; that most documentation on the 1789 events was released in 1830 and could have been tampered with; that the whole process was a sort of coup agreed between Floridablanca and Campomanes; and other points.

The opinion that the 1789 Cortes did alter the 1713 succession law would seem to support the dynastic claim of Fernando's descendants; hence, scholars holding that opinion were usually labeled Cristinos, Isabellinos, or Alfonsinos. They tended to repudiate any argument alleging the non-binding legal character of the 1789 events, their key line of reasoning being that Carlos IV adopted a new law in full agreement with the Cortes, and that the publication of that law was a minor technical issue. Among their other claims, not entirely without contradictions, were the following: that deputies were specifically asked to come equipped with powers to discuss all issues; that the reason for not applying the law retroactively was that Fernando's daughter Isabel had not been born at the time; that Carlos IV formally approved of the Cortes petition; that the author of Novisima Recopilación was not aware of the 1789 law; and that Fernando as the son of Carlos IV inherited from him the right to publish the law at a time deemed appropriate. Some claim that the law entered into force already in 1789, referring to the "Pragmatic Sanction of Carlos IV/of 1789", some that it entered into force upon its publication in 1830, referring to the "Pragmatic Sanction of Fernando VII/of 1830", and some refer to both.

== Other questions ==
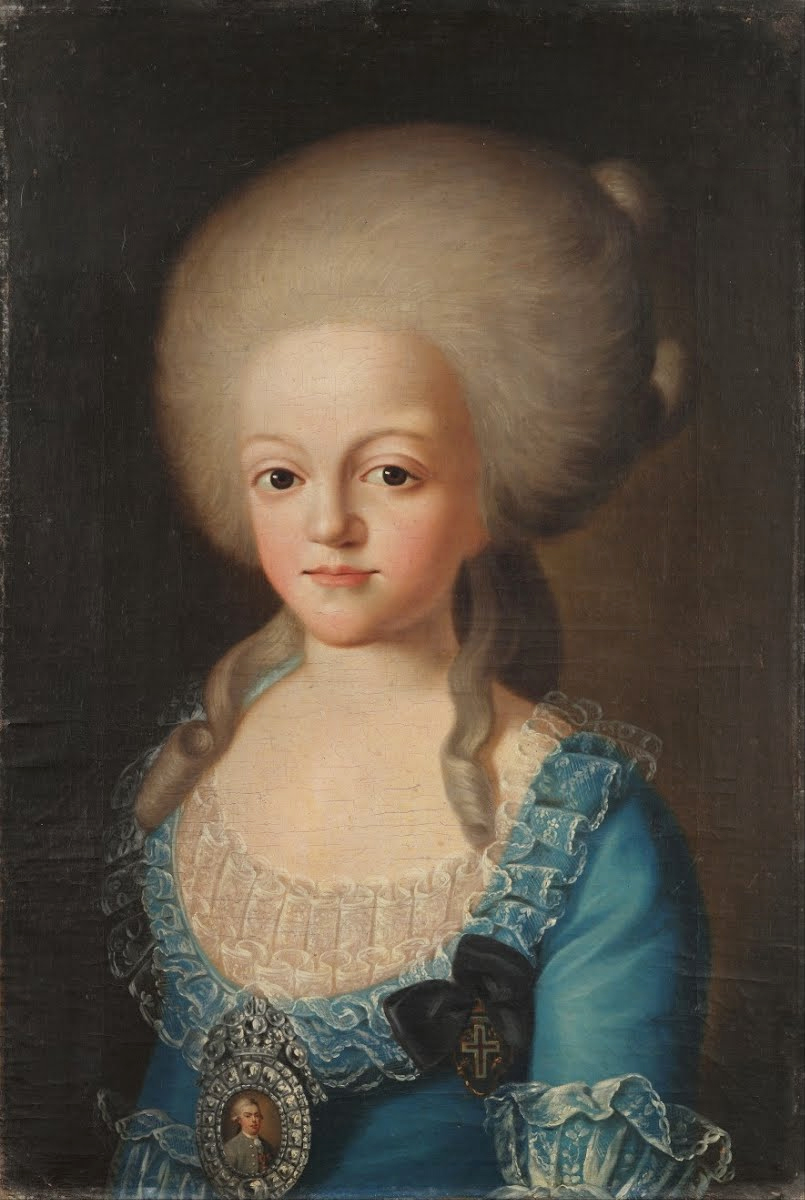
Carlota Joaquina

Apart from the problem of the legally binding or non-binding nature of the 1789 events, in particular two questions stand out, namely the motives for launching the procedure to change the 1713 law, and the reasons for keeping the process and its outcome secret.

Many scholars suggest that the initiative should be considered against the broad background of foreign policy, mostly though not exclusively related to a would-be union with Portugal. In September 1788, Prince João, upon the unexpected death of his older brother, became heir to the Portuguese throne, and his wife Carlota Joaquina, daughter of Carlos IV, became a queen-in-waiting. Her assumption of the Spanish throne would enable a Spanish–Portuguese union, a constant objective of Spanish foreign policy since medieval times. It is also suggested that another important motive was ensuring succession to descendants of Carlos IV. In 1789 he had four daughters, aged 14, 10, 7 and less than 1-year old, and two sons, aged 5 and 1. His four other sons all having died at the age of three or younger, he may have feared the potential loss of his remaining sons. However, from their early infancy, Carlos IV intended to secure the succession to his daughters, who now had already grown out of the very dangerous early age. One more motive could have been that the 1713 law limited succession to males born in Spain; with Carlos IV born in Naples, this might have served as a far-fetched yet viable legal claim against his rule. Finally, some historians point to the desire to re-establish traditional Spanish regulations just for the sake of their traditional nature.

Nuances of foreign policy are also commonly quoted as motives for keeping the proceedings secret. It is supposed that Carlos IV feared the adverse reaction of the courts in Paris and Naples, especially that both monarchs would protest to Madrid should news of the 1789 agreement leak out despite the renewed secrecy oath. Following the outbreak of the Revolution, France was deemed unpredictable and Carlos IV was determined to avoid any provocation. There are also scholars who suspect that his intention from the outset was to apply or not to apply the 1789 rule depending upon the circumstances, and that secrecy allowed him more room for maneuvering. Finally, some authors admit that the reasons for keeping the decision secret are unclear.

Other questions related to the 1789 Cortes that remain have a less fundamental character. Was the 1789 Cortes routine or exceptional? To what extent was the procedure inspired by ilustrados and other proponents of a new line? Did the Cortes strengthen or weaken the absolutist position of the king? To what extent did Floridablanca and Campomanes influence the Cortes? Who was the moving spirit behind the attempt to alter the succession law: Floridablanca, Queen Maria Luisa, or Carlos IV? Did the deputies adopt the royal proposal swiftly and unanimously because they appreciated the motives, because they were servile, or for some other reason?

== Current historiographic reading ==
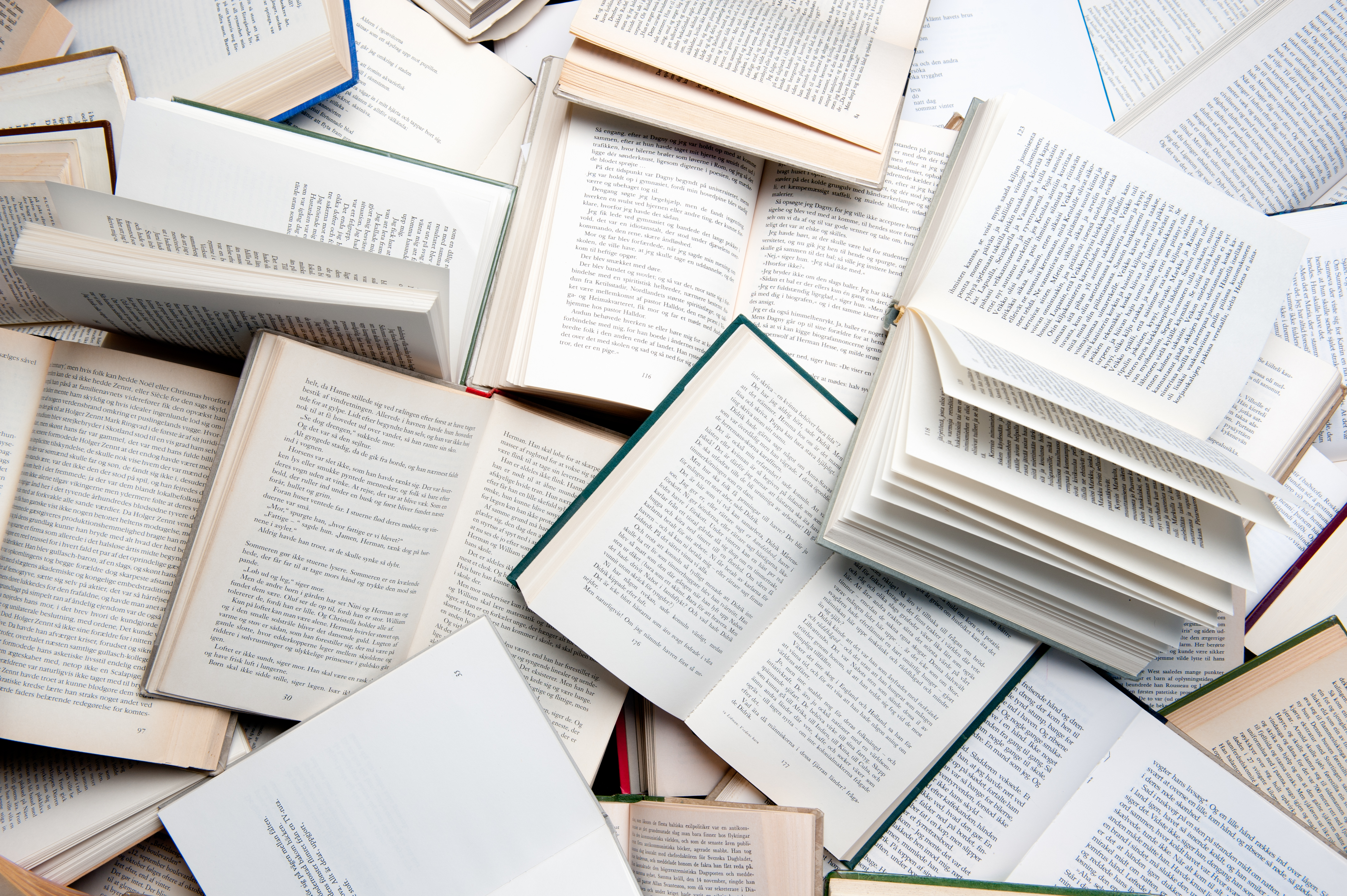

Though the object of heated debate in the 19th century, today the question of the succession law 1789 generates little interest among professional historians; the last identified dedicated monograph dates from 1978. Some authors consider the succession issue the only important point of the 1789 Cortes, while others refer to it as a minor problem, second to questions of rural rent, mayorazgos and other agrarian issues. In some syntheses the 1789 debate is completely absent from chapters dedicated to Carlos IV, and only briefly referred to when discussing the 1830 document of Fernando VII. In general, historians tend to avoid normative pronouncements on the 1789 process, though the wording used in different works can vary enormously, possibly suggesting diverging interpretations.

One group of authors suggest that the events of 1789 effectively changed the succession law, claiming that Carlos IV decreed the Pragmatic Sanction while keeping its contents secret; others tend to agree vaguely that the 1713 law was effectively altered in 1789, although the decision was not published. Some write ambiguously about the issue, noting that while the law of 1713 was indeed changed in 1789, the decision was only put into effect in 1830, or stating both that the 1713 law was "modified during the reign of Carlos IV" and that the new regulation was promulgated in 1830. Some claim that Carlos IV did not promulgate any such law, while at the same time referring to the "Pragmatic Sanction of Carlos IV". Yet another group of authors make no reference either to a "law of 1789" or to an "amendment of the 1713 law", dwelling instead on the approval of the Cortes of the draft, on Carlos IV "returning to traditional law", on procuradores agreeing the petition, on Cortes "registering the proposal", etc. Finally, there are historians who more or less clearly suggest that while the new law was indeed "formulated" or "agreed" in 1789, it did not enter into force at that time. This is also the position shared by most historians related to Carlism, although they add that the 1830 promulgation was not legally binding either. The author of the latest monograph on the issue presents it under yet another perspective, namely that the 1789 events should not be viewed in isolation but analyzed as one of 8 phases, starting with the law of 1713 and ending with the decree of 1832.

== See also ==
- Carlism
- Alfonsism
- succession regulations of 1713
- succession regulations of 1830
