= Maria Cristina, Queen of Spain =

Maria Cristina, Queen of Spain may refer to:

- Maria Christina of Bourbon-Two Sicilies, wife of Ferdinand VII of Spain
- Maria Christina of Austria, wife of Alfonso XII of Spain
