= Pragmatic Sanction of 1830 =

Reform of Spanish royal succession law

The Pragmatic Sanction of 1830 (Spanish: Pragmática Sanción), issued on 29 March 1830 by King Ferdinand VII of Spain, ratified a Decree of 1789 by Charles IV of Spain, which had replaced the semi-Salic system established by Philip V of Spain with the mixed succession system that predated the Bourbon monarchy (see also Carlism).

When Philip V, from the French House of Bourbon acceded to the Spanish throne in the War of the Spanish Succession, he brought with him the Salic law, which restricted succession to the throne to the direct male line. However, King Ferdinand VII would father only two daughters, Isabella and Luisa Fernanda of Bourbon. Ferdinand's father, Charles IV of Spain had made a weak attempt to eliminate the Salic Law, and Ferdinand brought forth the Pragmatic Sanction of 1830, so that his oldest daughter would inherit the throne and be declared queen upon his death, as was the older Castilian law.

This removed his brother, Infante Carlos, Count of Molina, as the next in the line of succession under Salic Law. Carlos' supporters, among whom was Francisco Calomarde, pressured Ferdinand VII to repeal the Pragmatic Sanction. A severe attack of gout, however, incapacitated Ferdinand and, when he died on 29 September 1833, Isabella was proclaimed queen. As she was still a minor, the kingdom fell under the regency of her mother Maria Christina of the Two Sicilies.
