= María Amparo Muñoz y Borbón, 1st Countess of Vista Alegre =

Spanish aristocrat

María Amparo Muñoz y Borbón
- 1st Countess of Vista Alegre; Princess Czartoryski
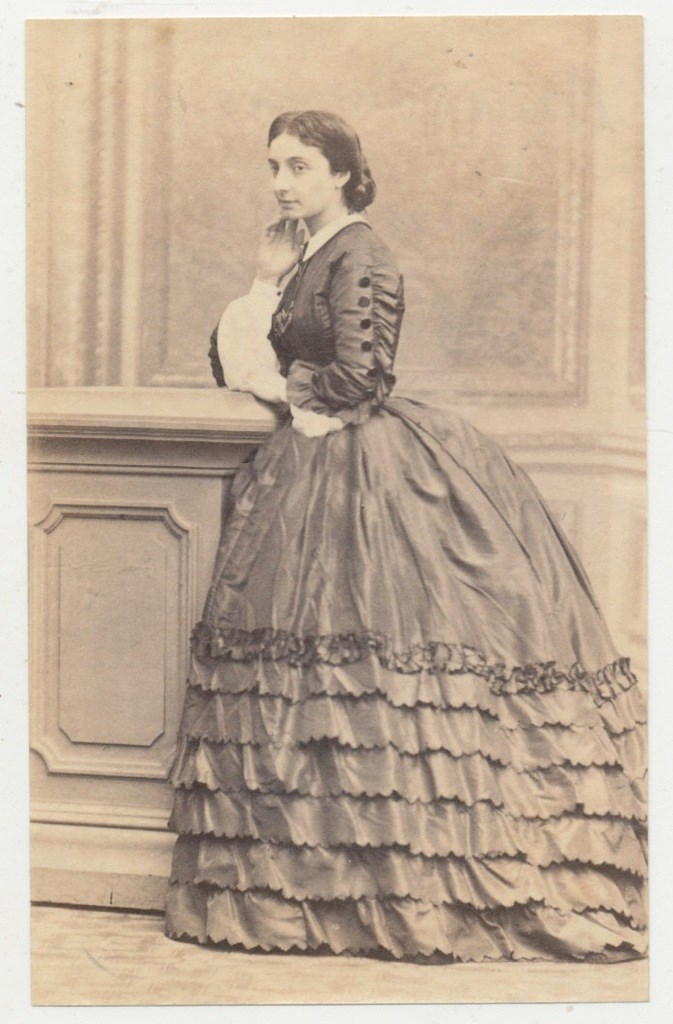
- Photograph by Eugène Disdéri
- Born: 17 November 1834; Madrid, Kingdom of Spain
- Died: 19 August 1864 (aged 29); Paris, Second French Republic
- Burial: 1865; Sieniawa
- Spouse: Prince Władysław Czartoryski (m. 1855)
- Issue: August Czartoryski
- Father: Agustín Fernando Muñoz, 1st Duke of Riánsares
- Mother: Queen Dowager Maria Christina

Doña María Amparo Muñoz y Borbón, 1st Countess of Vista Alegre (17 November 1834 – 19 August 1864) was the daughter of Maria Christina of the Two Sicilies, queen dowager and regent of Spain, and her morganatic second husband, Agustín Fernando Muñoz, Duke of Riánsares (before he was Duke). Her full title was María de los Desamparados Muñoz y de Borbón, condesa de Vista Alegre.

== Biography ==
=== Birth and background ===
Her mother, Queen mother María Christina, had been the fourth queen consort of Ferdinand VII of Spain, a maternal uncle with whom she had had two daughters; the elder, Infanta María Isabel Luisa, was proclaimed Queen Isabella II of Spain at the age of three upon her father's death on 29 September 1833, with Queen Mother María Christina as regent. María Christina married Agustín Fernando Muñoz, a sergeant from the royal guard, on 28 December 1833, and María Amparo was their first child, born in Madrid in 1834.

=== First Carlist War and life in France ===
The conservative supporters of the late king's brother, Carlos de Borbón, believed that Carlos should have been next in line to the throne. The infant Queen Isabella held on to the throne through the period of the First Carlist War, in which General Baldomero Espartero led the forces of Queen Isabella to victory. Soon after the war's end, in 1840, Espartero took over as regent, with María Amparo leaving with her parents to live in exile in France. There, María Amparo and her siblings grew up in the Château de Malmaison. In 1844, when María Amparo's half-sister Queen Isabella was declared to be of age, Isabella gave their father (stepfather), Muñoz, the title Duque de Riánsares.

On 1 March 1855, María Amparo was married at Malmaison to Władysław Czartoryski, a Polish prince living in exile in France. They lived at the Hôtel Lambert, the Czartoryski family's base of operations during the Second French Empire. She and Prince Władysław had a son, August Czartoryski, born on 2 August 1858. August became a priest in 1892, and acted in ways that have led to his consideration for sainthood, receiving beatification in 2004.

=== Illness and death ===
María Amparo contracted tuberculosis, which she passed to her son when he was six. She died shortly thereafter on 19 August 1864, aged 29, in Paris. Her remains were buried in the tomb of three of her brothers in the cemetery at Rueil-Malmaison. A year later her husband moved them to his family mausoleum in Sieniawa.
