= Agustín Muñoz y Borbón, 1st Duke of Tarancón =

Spanish aristocrat (1837–1855)

Agustín Muñoz, 1st Duke of Tarancón
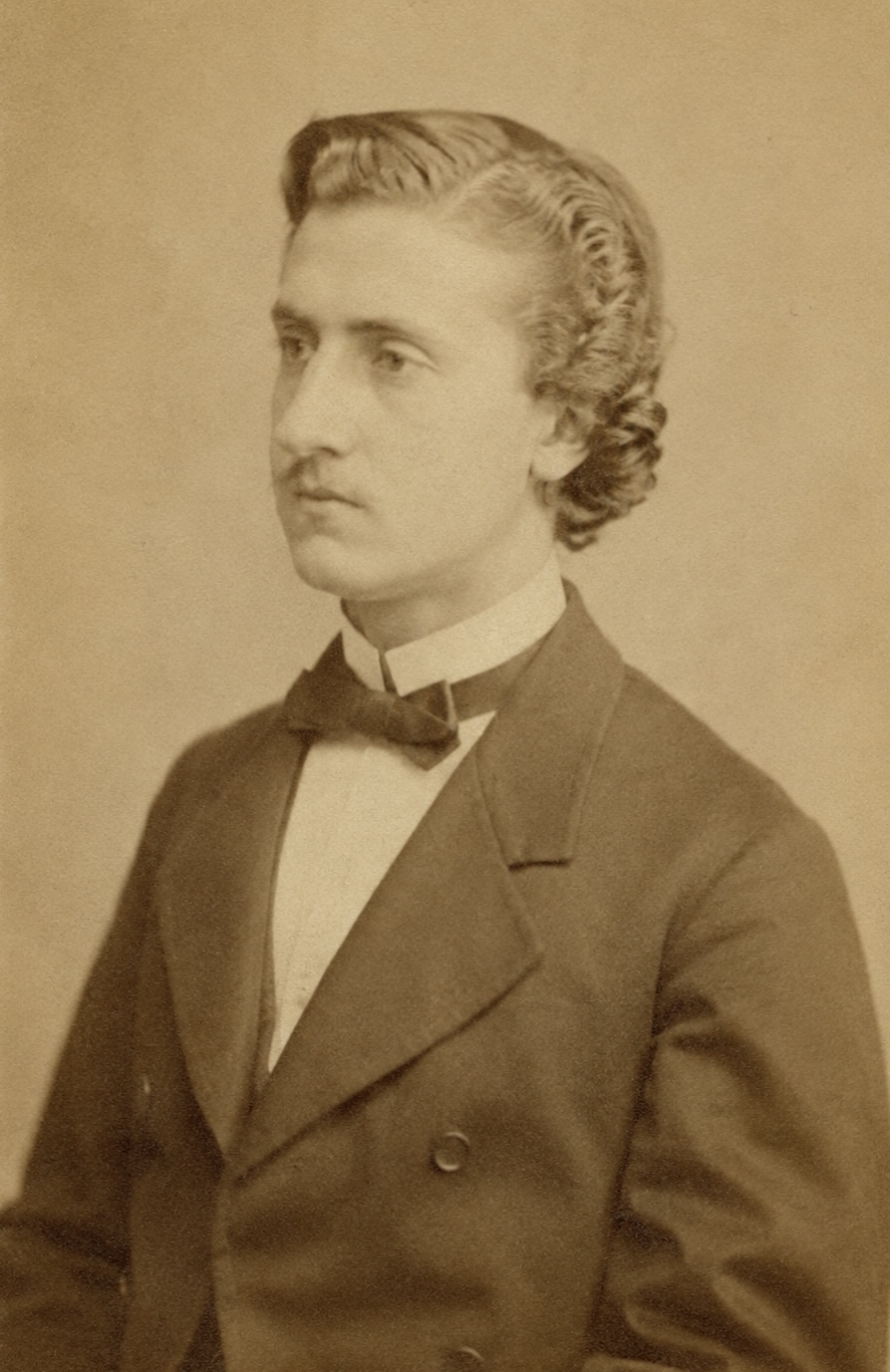
- Born: 15 March 1837; Royal Palace of Madrid, Spain
- Died: 15 July 1855 (aged 18)
- Burial: Rueil-Malmaison, France
- Father: Agustín Fernando Muñoz, Duke of Riánsares
- Mother: Maria Christina of the Two Sicilies

Don Agustín Maria Muñoz y de Borbon, 1st Duke of Tarancón, Grandee of Spain (es: Don Agustín Maria Muñoz, Duque de Tarancón) (15 March 1837 – 15 July 1855) was the eldest son of Maria Christina, Queen mother and Regent of Spain, and of her morganatic second husband Agustín Fernando Muñoz, Duke of Riánsares (made duke in 1844 by his step-daughter, Isabella II of Spain).

== Biography ==
Muñoz was born in Madrid while his mother was still Regent of Spain and his parents' marriage was not publicly known. In 1840 Muñoz went with his parents into exile in France. In 1842 his mother purchased the Château de Malmaison where Muñoz and his siblings grew up.

In 1844 Muñoz's half-sister Queen Isabella II of Spain was declared to be of age. On 19 November 1847, Isabella gave to Muñoz the title Duke of Tarancón (duque de Tarancón) which was attached to a Grandeeship. On 10 June 1849 she gave Muñoz a second title, Viscount of Rostrollano (vizconde de Rostrollano).

== Death ==
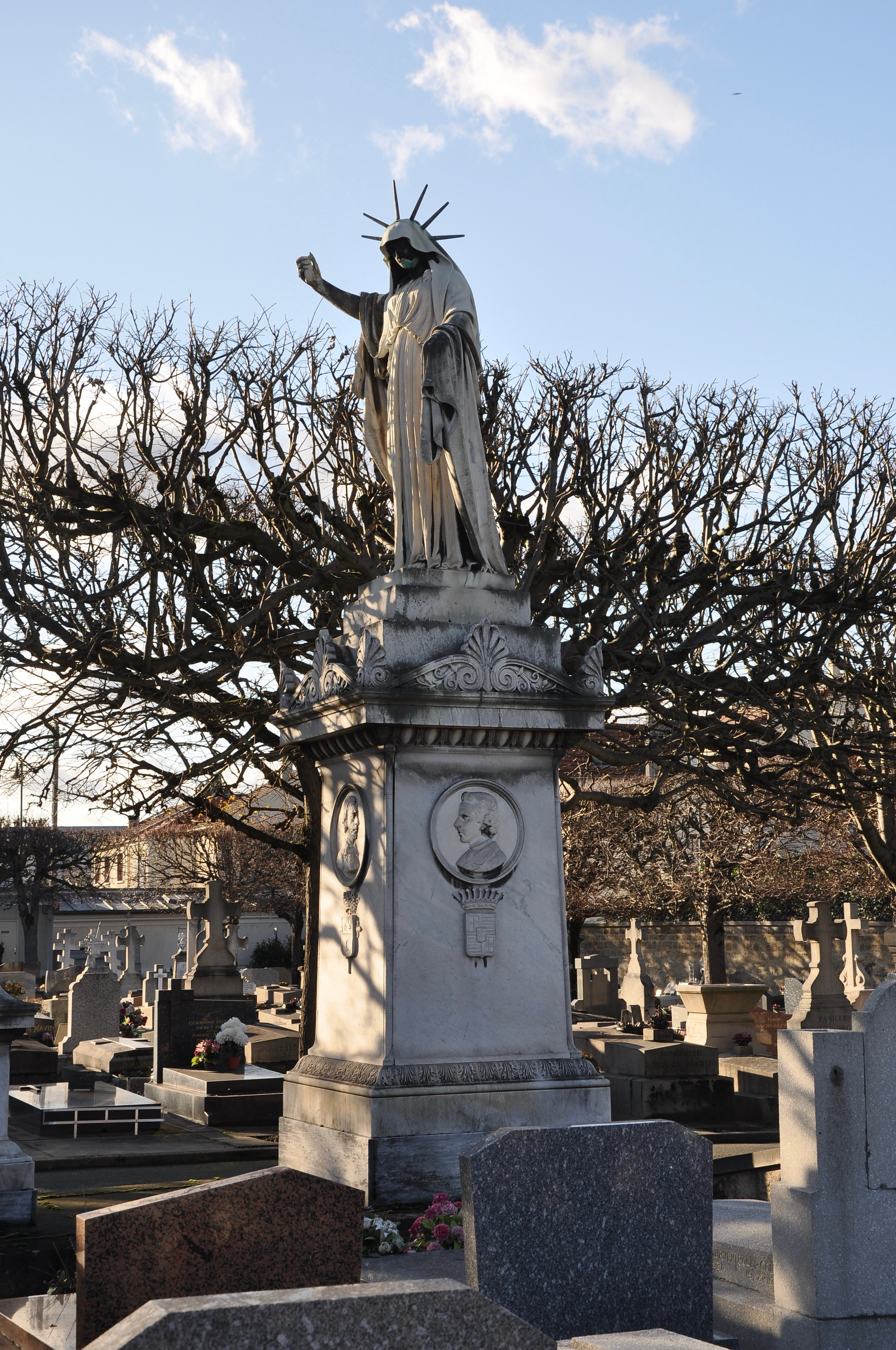
Monument of Three Children, an homage to the three sons of Queen Marie Christine who died in French exile, in the cemetery of Rueil-Malmaison. Sculptor: Felipe Moratilla y Parreto

With exile imposed on his mother by the Spanish Courts first, and by his own sister Queen Isabella II, Muñoz moved with her mother to France, where he would live in the town of Rueil-Malmaison, near Paris, settling in the Château de Malmaison who had previously belonged to the Empress Josephine. He died in the same palace on 15 July 1855, at the age of 18, and was buried in the Rueil-Malmaison cemetery, where his mother had a mausoleum built in memory of the three children who died before her.
