= Fernando Muñoz y Borbón, 2nd Duke of Tarancón =

Spanish noble

Fernando Muñoz, 2nd Duke of Tarancón
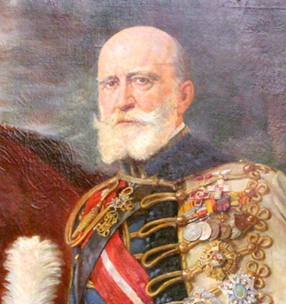
- Born: 27 April 1838; Madrid, Spain
- Died: 7 October 1910 (aged 72)
- Father: Agustín Fernando Muñoz, Duke of Riánsares
- Mother: Maria Christina of the Two Sicilies

Fernando María Muñoz y Borbón (April 27, 1838 – December 7, 1910), also known as Fernando Muñoz, 2nd Duke of Tarancón and Riánsares, was the second son and fourth child of the Maria Christina, Regent of Spain, and her morganatic husband Agustín Fernando Muñoz, Duke of Riánsares. As such, he was the half-brother of Queen Isabella II.

== Biography ==
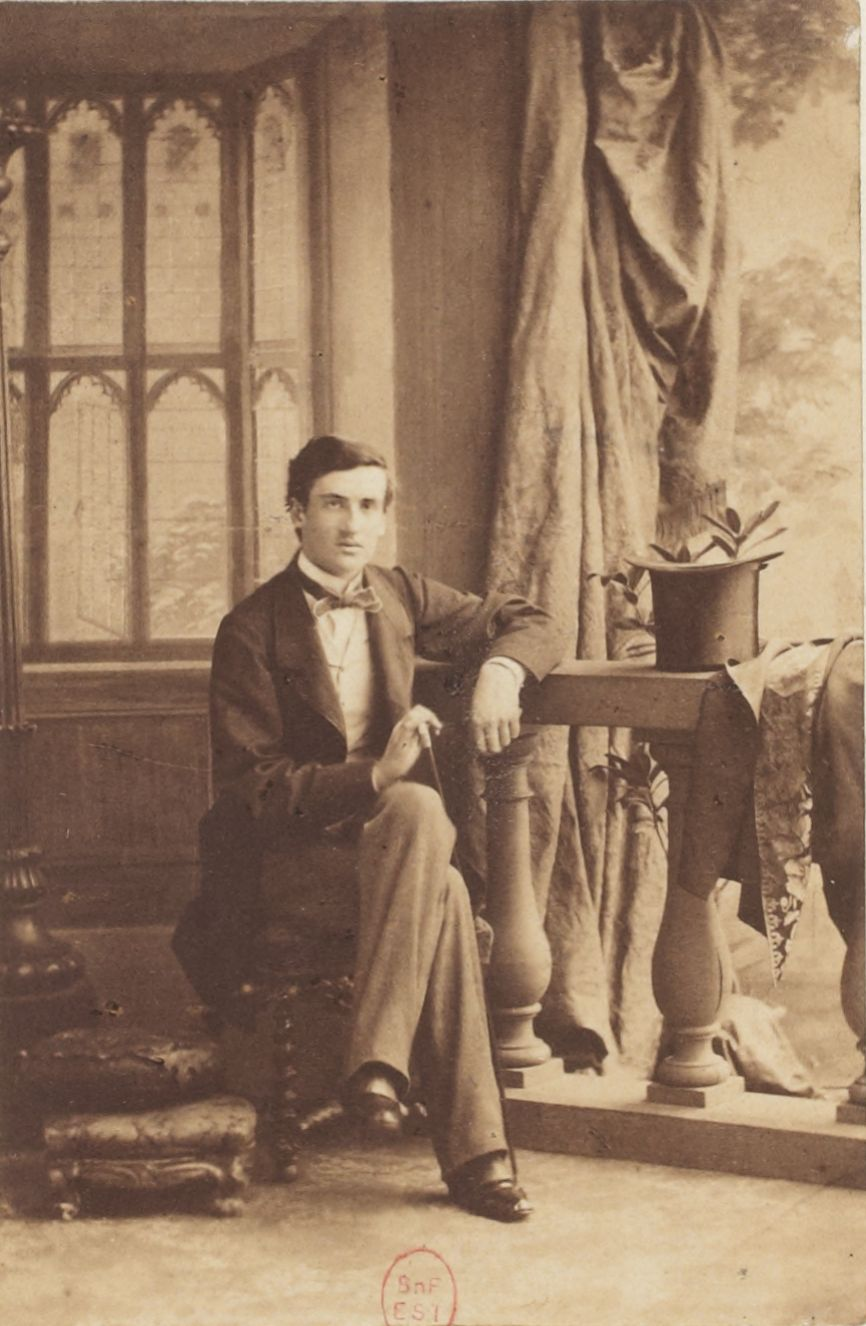
Photograph of Fernando by Camille Silvy, c. 1860

In 1840, Fernando María Muñoz y Borbón was exiled from Spain along with his parents when Baldomero Espartero, Prince of Vergara, took power. They returned to Madrid in 1843. However, in 1847, the queen mother was once again exiled to France with her children, settling in Rueil-Malmaison.

During this period of exile, Fernando faced significant family losses. His older brother, Agustín, died without descendants on July 15, 1855, at the age of 18. His other brothers, Juan Muñoz, Count of Recuerdo, and José Muñoz, Count of Gracia, died as well. As the sole surviving son, Fernando inherited his older brother's titles, becoming the Duke of Tarancón and Viscount of Rostrollano.

In 1873, upon his father's death, Fernando became the Duke of Riánsares and Montmorot. Following the restoration of the monarchy in 1874, he returned to Spain during the reign of his nephew, Alfonso XII, who conferred upon him the title of Grandee of Spain.

== Marriage and descendants ==
On September 11, 1861, he married Eladia Bernaldo de Quirós González de Cienfuegos, daughter of José María Bernaldo de Quirós Llanes, 7th Marquis de Campo Sagrado, who gave him eleven children:

- María Cristina Muñoz y Borbón de Quirós (1862),
- Eladia Muñoz y Borbón de Quirós (1863–1933),
- Fernando Muñoz y Borbón de Quirós (1864–1913), 3rd Duke of Riánsares and Tarancón,
- María Josefa Muñoz y Borbón de Quirós (1865–1947),
- Rita Muñoz y Borbón de Quirós (1865–1952),
- María del Consuelo Muñoz y Borbón de Quirós (1866–1947),
- María de los Dolores Muñoz y Borbón de Quirós (1866–1931),
- José Muñoz y Borbón de Quirós (1868–1891),
- Juan Bautista Muñoz y Borbón de Quirós (1870–1943),
- María de la Inmaculada Muñoz y Borbón de Quirós (1873–1914),
- Genoveva Muñoz y Borbón de Quirós (1875–1890).

== Sources ==
- Real Academia de la Historia: Diccionario Biográfico electrónico (DB~e) - Fernando María Muñoz y Borbón
