= Agustín Fernando Muñoz y Sánchez, 1st Duke of Riánsares =

1st Duke of Riánsares (1808–1873)

The Most Excellent Agustín Muñoz y Sánchez
- Duke of Riánsares
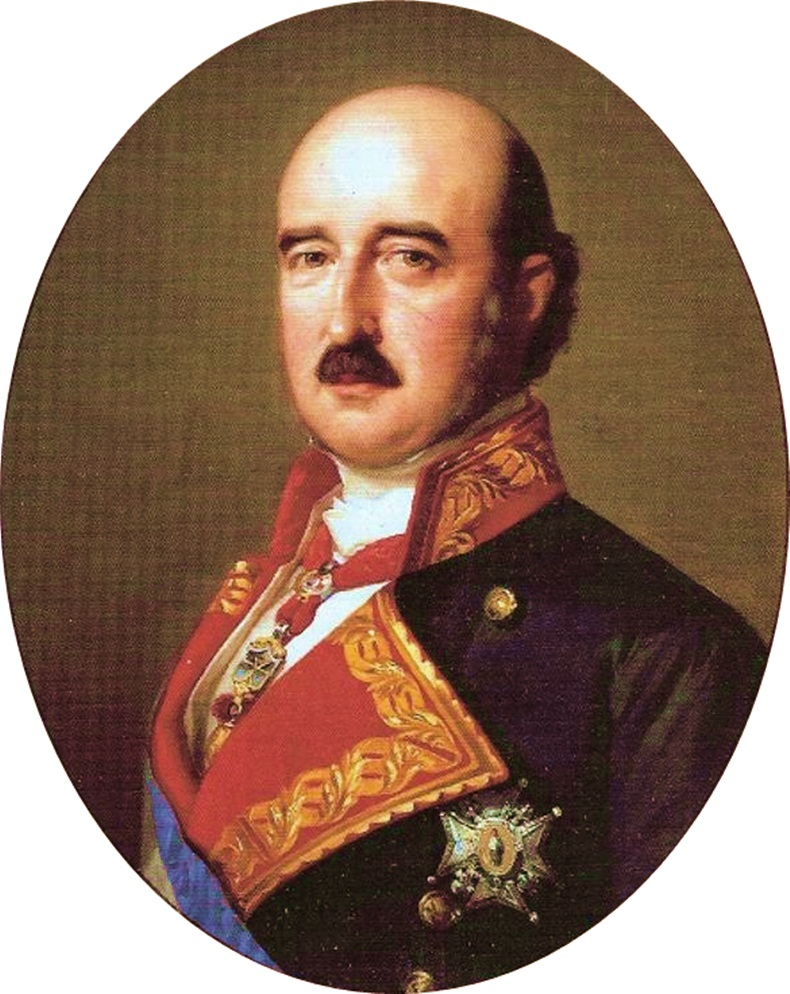
- Portrait of Agustín Muñoz, c. 1855–65
- Born: Agustín Fernando Muñoz y Sánchez; 4 May 1808; Tarancón, Spain
- Died: 11 September 1873 (aged 65); Le Havre, France
- Spouse: Maria Christina of the Two Sicilies (m. 1833)
- Issue among others...: María Amparo Muñoz y Borbón, 1st Countess of Vista Alegre; Agustín María Muñoz y Borbón, 1st Duke of Tarancón; Fernando María Muñoz y Borbón, 2nd Duke of Tarancón; María Cristina Muñoz y Borbón, Marquise of la Isabela

Don Agustín Fernando Muñoz y Sánchez (4 May 1808 – 11 September 1873), 1st Duke of Riánsares, 1st Marquess of San Agustín, 1st Duke de Montmorot (in France), was the second and morganatic husband of Queen Maria Christina, Regent of Spain.

== Early life ==
Muñoz was born at Tarancón in the Province of Cuenca, New Castile. He was the second son of Juan Antonio Muñoz de Funes (1779–1849), later created Count of Retamoso and his wife, Eusebia Maria Sánchez Ortega (b. 1781). His paternal grandmother Eugenia Dorotea de Funes Martínez (b. 1753) was a nursemaid of Infanta Carlota Joaquina, while his father was the keeper of an estanco or office for the sale of the tobacco of the government monopoly.

== Marriage to the Queen Regent ==
Muñoz enlisted in the Royal Guard, and he attracted the attention of Queen Maria Christina. According to one account, he distinguished himself by stopping the runaway horses of her carriage; according to another, he only picked up her handkerchief; a third and scandalous explanation of his fortune has been given. Maria Christina's husband, King Ferdinand VII died on 28 September 1833 and, on 29 December 1833, she and Muñoz were privately married.

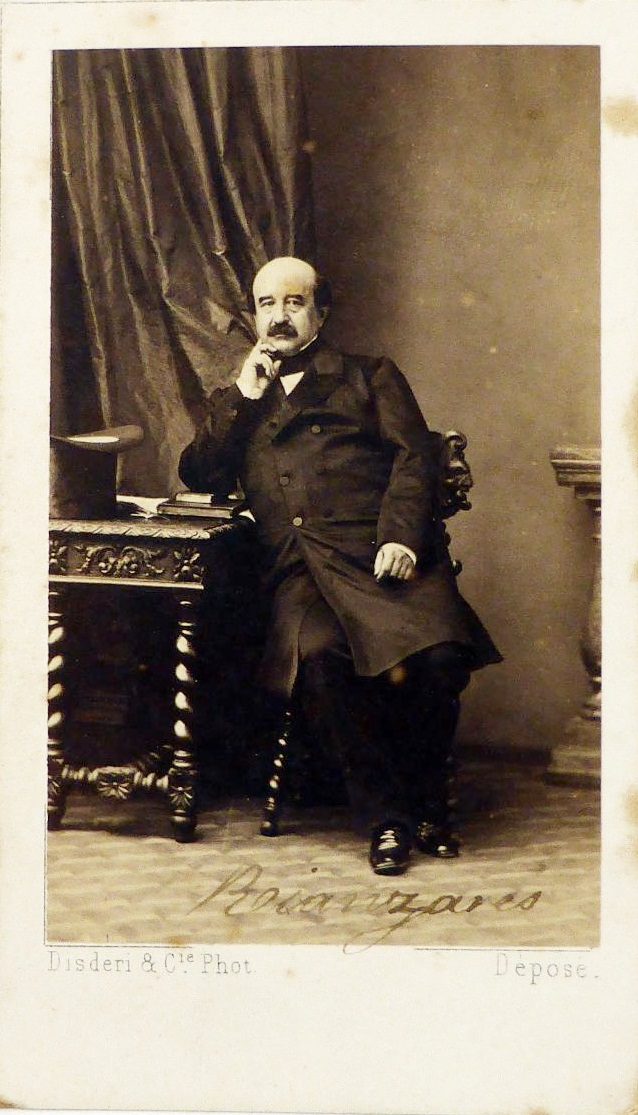
The Duke of Riánsares

If Maria Christina had officially made the marriage public, she would have forfeited the regency; but her relations with Muñoz were perfectly well known within the Spanish court. When on 13 August 1836 the soldiers on duty at the summer palace of La Granja mutinied and forced the regent to grant a Constitution, it was generally, though wrongly, believed that they overcame her reluctance by seizing Muñoz, whom they called her guapo, or fancy man, and threatening to shoot him. In 1840 Maria Christina found her position intolerable; she renounced the regency and left Spain with Muñoz. In 1842 Maria Christina purchased the Château de Malmaison as their residence. In 1843, on the overthrow of General Baldomero Espartero they returned to Spain.

== Public recognition of the marriage ==
In 1844, Muñoz's stepdaughter Queen Isabella II was declared to be of age. On 23 June 1844 Isabella created Muñoz as Duke of Riánsares, with the dignity of Grandee; the title came from the river Ánsares, near Muñoz's birthplace in Tarancón. On 12 October 1844, Isabella gave official consent to the marriage between her mother and Muñoz, and it was publicly performed. In 1846 Isabella made Muñoz a Knight of the Golden Fleece. On 30 May 1846 she gave Muñoz a second title, Marquess of San Agustín. Muñoz was made a captain general, the highest rank in the Spanish Army. In 1847 Louis Philippe, King of the French, gave Muñoz the title of Duke de Montmorot; he also invested Muñoz with the Grand Cross of the Legion of Honour.

Until driven from Spain with Maria Christina by the revolutionary movement of 1854, Muñoz is credibly reported to have applied himself to making a large fortune out of railway concessions and by judicious stock exchange speculations. Of political ambitions he had none. All authorities agree that he was not only good-looking, but kind and well-bred.

Muñoz died in 1873, five years before his wife, at his home, Villa Mon Désir in Le Havre, near Sainte-Adresse, in France. His remains are buried in the crypt of the Santuario de Nuestra Señora de Riánsares, several kilometres outside Tarancón.

== Children ==
Muñoz and Maria Christina had several children:

- María Amparo Muñoz, 1st Countess of Vista Alegre (17 November 1834 – 19 August 1864) married Prince Władysław Czartoryski (1828–1894)
- Maria de los Milagros Muñoz, 1st Marchioness of Castillejo (8 November 1835 – 9 July 1903) married to Filippo del Drago, Prince di Mazzano e d'Antuni (1824–1913).
- Agustín Muñoz, 1st Duke of Tarancón (15 March 1837 – 15 July 1855)
- Fernando Muñoz, 2nd Duke of Tarancón and Riansares (27 April 1838 – 7 December 1910) married to Eladia Bernaldo de Quirós y Gonzalez de Cienfuegos (1839–1909).
- María Cristina Muñoz, Marchioness of La Isabella (19 April 1840 – 20 December 1921) married to Jose Maria Bernaldo de Quirós y Gonzalez de Cienfuegos, 8th Marquess de Campo Sagrado (1840–1911).
- Juan Muñoz, Count of Recuerdo (29 August 1841 – 2 April 1863)
- Antonio Muñoz y de Borbón (3 November 1842 – 1847)
- José Muñoz, Count of Gracia (21 December 1843 – 17 December 1863)
