= María Cristina Muñoz y Borbón, 1st Marquise of la Isabela =

Spanish aristocrat

María Cristina Muñoz y Borbón
- 1st Marquise of la Isabela; 1st Viscountess of la Dehesilla
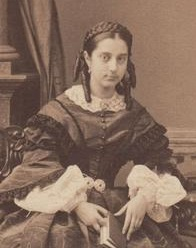
- Born: 19 April 1840; Royal Palace of Madrid
- Died: 20 December 1921 (aged 81); Tutor Street
- Spouses: José María Bernaldo de Quirós y González de Cienfuegos, Marquis of Campo Sagrado
- Issue: Jesús María Bernaldo de Quirós; Ana Germana Bernaldo de Quirós; María de los Desamparados Bernaldo de Quirós
- Father: Agustín Fernando Muñoz y Sánchez
- Mother: Maria Christina of the Two Sicilies

María Cristina Muñoz y Borbón (19 April 1840 - 20 December 1921) was a Spanish aristocrat, 1st Marquise of la Isabela.

== Biography ==
Born on 19 April 1840 in the Royal Palace of Madrid, she was the uterine sister of Queen Isabella II, one the children conceived in the marriage between Queen Regent Maria Christina and her morganatic husband Agustín Fernando Muñoz y Sánchez, 1st Duke of Riánsares.

She was granted the titles of Viscountess of La Dehesilla and the title of Marchioness of La Isabela in 1847.

She married in the Malmaison on 20 October 1860 José María Bernaldo de Quirós y González de Cienfuegos, 8th Marquis of Campo Sagrado, with whom she had three surviving children: Jesús María, Ana Germana and María de los Desamparados.

She died in Tutor Street 22, Madrid on 20 December 1921.

She is an ancestor of Íñigo Méndez de Vigo and Carlos Espinosa de los Monteros.

== Ancestry ==
Ancestors of María Cristina Muñoz y Borbón, 1st Marquise of la Isabela

8. Francisco Javier Muñoz y Carrillo de Torres
4. Juan Antonio Muñoz y Funes, 1st Count of Retamoso
9. Eugenia Dorotea Funes Martínez
2. Agustín Fernando Muñoz y Sánchez, 1st Duke of Riánsares
10. Gabriel Antonio Sánchez Ordoñez
5. Eusebia Sánchez y Ortega
11. María Francisca Ortega Campos
1. María Cristina Muñoz y Borbón, 1st Marquise of la Isabela
12. Ferdinand I of the Two Sicilies
6. Francis I of the Two Sicilies
13. Maria Carolina of Austria
3. Maria Christina of the Two Sicilies
14. Charles IV of Spain
7. Maria Isabella of Spain
15. Maria Luisa of Parma
