= Maria Christina of the Two Sicilies =

Queen of Spain from 1829 to 1833

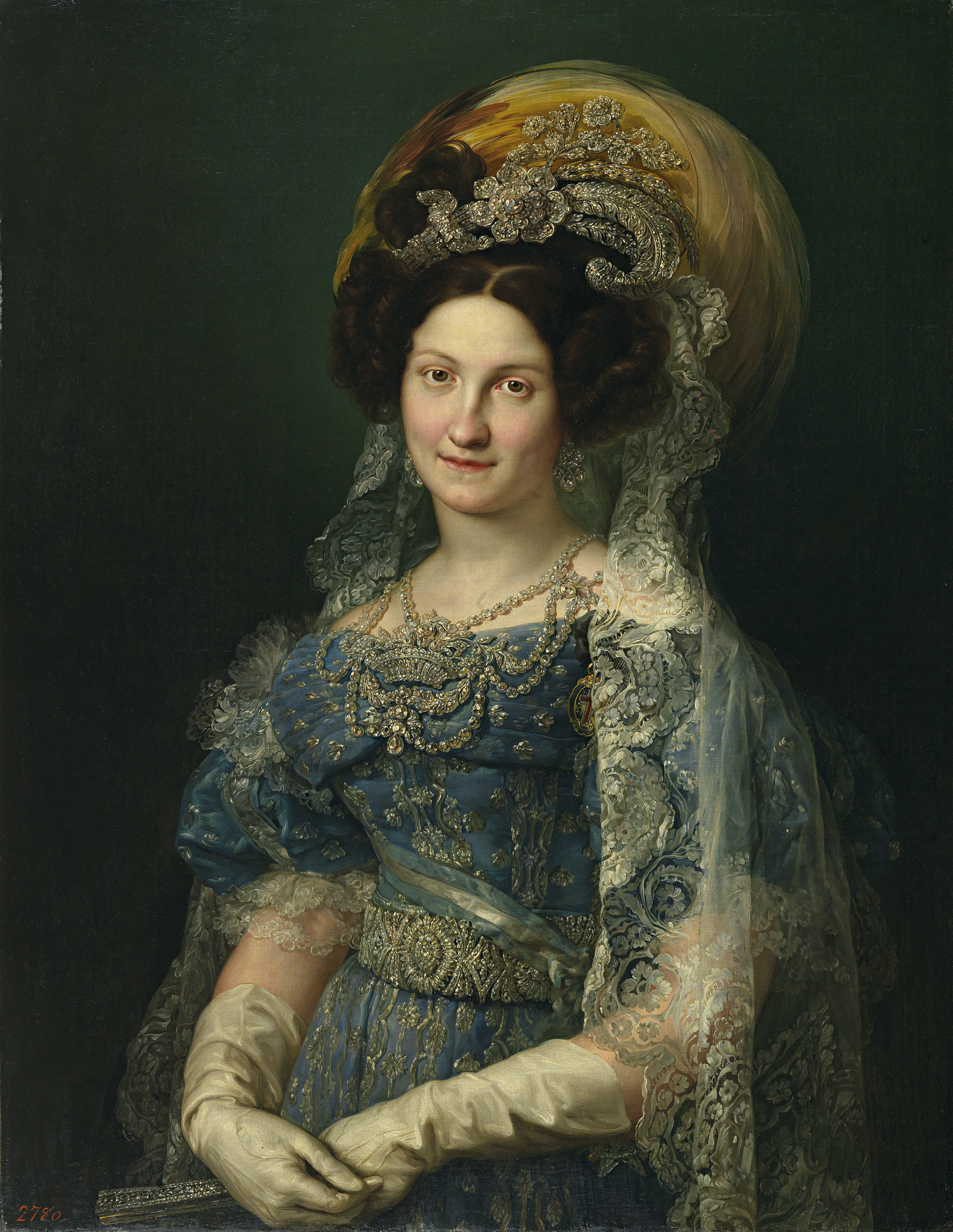
- Portrait by Vicente López y Portaña, 1830

Queen consort of Spain
- Tenure: 11 December 1829 – 29 September 1833

Queen regent of Spain
- Regency: 29 September 1833 – 12 October 1840
- Monarch: Isabella II
- Born: 27 April 1806; Palermo, Kingdom of Sicily
- Died: 22 August 1878 (aged 72); Le Havre, France
- Burial: El Escorial
- Spouses: Ferdinand VII of Spain (m. 1829; died 1833) Agustín Fernando Muñoz y Sánchez, 1st Duke of Riánsares (m. 1833; died 1873)
- Issue among others...: Isabella II of Spain; Infanta Luisa Fernanda, Duchess of Montpensier; María Amparo Muñoz y Borbón, 1st Countess of Vista Alegre; Agustín Muñoz y Borbón, 1st Duke of Tarancón; Fernando Muñoz y Borbón, 2nd Duke of Tarancón; María Cristina Muñoz y Borbón, 1st Marquise of la Isabela
Names
- Maria Cristina Ferdinanda di Borbone delle 2 Sicilie
- House: Bourbon-Two Sicilies
- Father: Francis I of the Two Sicilies
- Mother: María Isabella of Spain

Maria Christina of the Two Sicilies (Italian: Maria Cristina Ferdinanda di Borbone, Principessa delle Due Sicilie, Spanish: María Cristina de Borbón, Princesa de las Dos Sicilias; 27 April 1806 – 22 August 1878) was the Queen of Spain from 1829 to 1833 and Queen regent of the kingdom from 1833, when her daughter became queen at age two, to 1840. By virtue of her short marriage to King Ferdinand VII of Spain, she became a central character in Spanish history for nearly 50 years, thanks to introducing a bicameral model of government based on the Bourbon Restoration in France: the Spanish Royal Statute of 1834.

== Early life ==
Born in Palermo, Sicily on April 27, 1806, she was the daughter of King Francis I of the Two Sicilies and Maria Isabella of Spain.

== Queen of Spain ==
On 27 May 1829, Maria Josepha Amalia of Saxony, the third wife of King Ferdinand VII of Spain, died. Ferdinand VII, old and ill, had not sired a male heir, sparking a succession duel between the Infanta Maria Francisca and the Infante Carlos, and the Infanta Luisa Carlotta and the Infante Francisco de Paula. Ferdinand VII declared his intention to marry and assembled the Council of Castile, who tasked the King with remarriage. Following Luisa Carlotta's suggestion, Ferdinand VII sent for Maria Christina, his niece, who pleased the King's eyes. They were married on 12 December 1829 at the Basilica of Nuestra Señora de Atocha.

With her betrothal and then marriage to Ferdinand VII, Maria Christina became embroiled in the conflict between the Spanish Liberals and the Carlists. The former faction, and the Spanish people, greatly revered Maria Christina, and made her their champion; when she first arrived in Madrid in 1829, the blue of the cloak she wore became their official color. The latter were absolutists and highly conservative, and derived their name from that of the Infante Carlos, who they favored for the throne. Using King Philip V's enactment of Salic law, which banned women from taking the throne, Maria Francisca and Carlos pushed for the latter's claim. Ferdinand VII and Maria Christina produced two daughters, Isabella on 10 October 1830 and Luisa Fernanda a little over a year later on 30 January 1832. However, in a secret session of the Cortes in 1789, King Charles IV reversed this law with the Pragmatic Sanction. Seeking to secure the succession of an heir of his siring, no matter their gender, Ferdinand VII announced the Pragmatic Sanction in March 1830.

In July 1832, Maria Christina, Ferdinand VII, their daughters, Maria Francisca and Carlos, and Maria Teresa, Princess of Beira, set out for the Royal Palace of La Granja. On the trip to La Granja, Ferdinand VII was badly injured by a coach accident. He became ill and increasingly sick over the summer. At one point, Ferdinand VII was found unconscious at the palace chapel. Seeking counsel in the event of Ferdinand VII's death, Maria approached the Carlist Francisco Calomarde, who advised her that the Spanish people would rally behind Carlos. Acting on this, she coerced Ferdinand VII into signing a decree making her regent if he died, with Carlos as her chief adviser. Carlos refused, demanding total governance. Calomarde, with Maria Francisca and Maria Theresa, reissued his warning, coercing King and Queen into repealing the Pragmatic Sanction. When Ferdinand VII appeared to have died, the repealing was announced publicly, and Maria Christina deserted by her courtiers. Ferdinand VII was discovered to be alive, and news of this also spread. Luisa Carlotta, at that time in Andalusia, soon arrived at La Granja and speedily persuaded Ferdinand to re-enact the Pragmatic Sanction and orchestrated Calomarde's dismissal.

== Regency ==
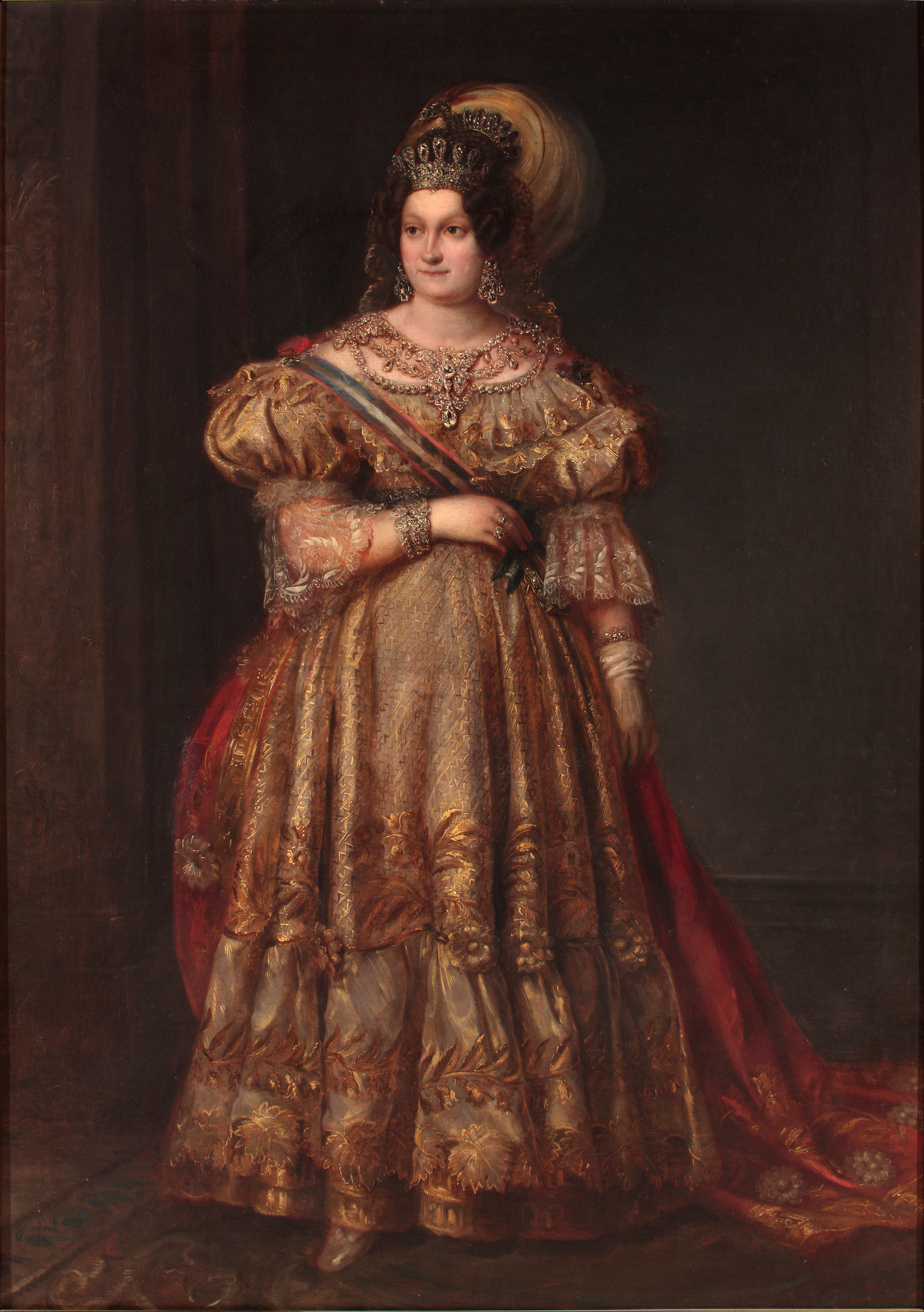
Maria Christina - Regent of Spain, by Valentín Carderera, mid 1830s

When Ferdinand died on 29 September 1833, Maria Christina became regent for their daughter Isabella. Isabella's claim to the throne was disputed by Carlos, who claimed that his brother Ferdinand had unlawfully changed the succession law to permit females to inherit the crown again (see Carlism). Some supporters of Don Carlos went so far as to claim that Ferdinand had actually bequeathed the crown to his brother but that Maria Christina had suppressed that fact. It was further alleged that the Queen had signed her dead husband's name to a decree recognizing Isabella as heir.

Carlos' attempt to seize power resulted in the First Carlist War. Despite considerable support for Carlos from conservative elements in Spain, Cristina's side (also known as "Isabelinos") successfully retained the throne for her daughter.

=== Downfall ===
On 28 December 1833, shortly after the death of Ferdinand VII, Maria Christina secretly married an ex-sergeant from the royal guard, Agustín Fernando Muñoz (1808–1873). Maria Christina and Muñoz had several children together while trying to keep their marriage a secret.

- Maria de los Desamparados, Countess of Vista Alegre (17 November 1834 - 19 August 1864); married Prince Władysław Czartoryski (1828–1894).
- Maria de los Milagros, Marchioness of Castillejo (8 November 1835 – 9 July 1903); married Prince Filippo Massimiliano Del Drago of Mazzano and Antuni (1824–1913). Their fourth son Giovanni Battista was known as the Prince del Drago in New York society.
- Agustín Maria, 1st Duke of Tarancón (15 March 1837 - 15 July 1855)
- Fernando Maria, 2nd Duke of Riansares and Tarancon (27 April 1838 – 7 December 1910); married Eladia Bernaldo de Quirós y González de Cienfuegos (1839–1909).
- Maria Cristina, Marchioness of La Isabella (19 April 1840 – 19 December 1921).
- Juan Bautista, Count of Recuerdo (29 August 1841 – 2 April 1863)
- Antonio Muñoz y de Borbón (3 November 1842 – 1847)
- Jose Maria, Count of Gracia (21 December 1843 – 17 December 1863)

Muñoz enlisted in the royal bodyguard, and attracted the attention of Maria Christina. According to one account, he distinguished himself by stopping the runaway horses of her carriage; according to another, he only picked up her handkerchief; a third, scandalous explanation of his fortune has been given. Maria Christina's husband, King Ferdinand VII of Spain died on 29 September 1833, and on 28 December 1833 she and Muñoz were privately married.

If Maria Christina had officially made the marriage public, she would have forfeited the regency; but her relations with Muñoz were perfectly well known within the Spanish court. When on 13 August 1836 the soldiers on duty at the La Granja summer palace mutinied and forced the regent to grant a constitution, it was generally, though wrongly, believed that they overcame her reluctance by seizing Muñoz, whom they called her guapo, or fancy man, and threatening to shoot him.

Eventually, news of Maria Christina's marriage to this low-ranking soldier became public. That news made Maria Christina deeply unpopular. Her position was undermined by news of her remarriage and concerns that she was not actually supportive of her liberal ministers and their policies. Eventually, the army, which was the backbone of Isabella II's support, and the liberal leadership in the Cortes combined to demand that Maria Christina stand aside from the regency. In 1840 Maria Christina found her position intolerable; she renounced the regency and left Spain with Muñoz. The army commander, General Baldomero Espartero, replaced her as regent.

== Titles and styles ==
- 27 April 1806 – 11 December 1829: Her Royal Highness Princess Maria Cristina of the Two Sicilies
- 11 December 1829 – 29 September 1833: Her Majesty The Queen
- 29 September 1833 – 12 October 1840: Her Majesty The Queen Governor (or Regent)
- 12 October 1840 – 30 September 1868: Her Majesty The Queen Mother Doña María Cristina de Borbón
- 30 September 1868 – 22 August 1878: Her Majesty The Queen Doña María Cristina de Borbón

== Exile ==
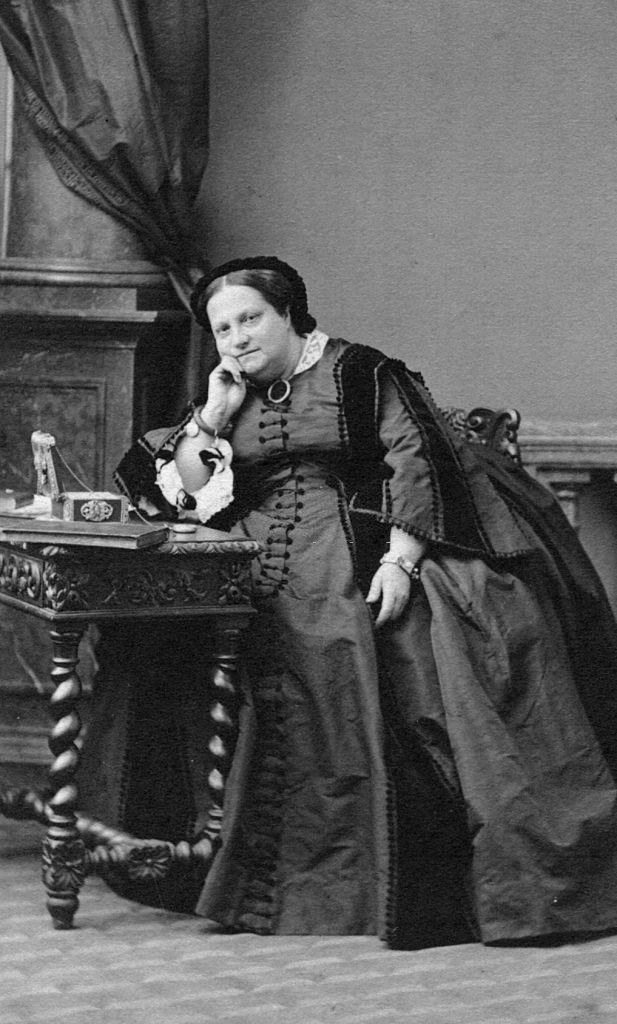
Queen Maria Christina of Spain in old age

In 1842 Maria Christina purchased the Château de Malmaison as her residence. In 1843, on the overthrow of General Baldomero Espartero she returned to Spain with her husband. In 1844, Muñoz's stepdaughter Queen Isabella II was declared to be of age. On 23 June 1844 Isabella gave to Muñoz the title Duque de Riánsares, to which was attached a Grandeza de España; the title came from the River Riánsares, near Muñoz's birthplace in Tarancón. On 12 October 1844 Isabella gave official consent to the marriage between her mother and Muñoz, and it was publicly performed. In 1846 Isabella made Muñoz a Knight of the Golden Fleece. On 30 May 1846 she gave Muñoz a second title, Marqués de San Agustín. Muñoz was made a Captain General, the highest rank in the Spanish Army. In 1847 Louis Philippe, King of the French, gave Muñoz the title Duc de Montmorot; he also invested Muñoz with the Grand Cross of the Légion d'honneur. In 1854, Maria Christina left for France a second time. France remained her primary residence for the remainder of her life.

== Death and burial ==
Maria Christina's illness returned and she suffered from serious coughing, fainting and fever. She died in Le Havre, France on 22 August 1878. As the mother of Isabella II and consort of Ferdinand VII, Maria Christina was buried in the royal crypt of El Escorial.

=== Ancestry ===
Ancestors of Maria Christina of the Two Sicilies

8. Charles III of Spain (= 12)
4. Ferdinand I of the Two Sicilies
9. Maria Amalia of Saxony (= 13)
2. Francis I of the Two Sicilies
10. Francis I, Holy Roman Emperor
5. Maria Carolina of Austria
11. Maria Theresa of Austria
1. Maria Cristina of the Two Sicilies
12. Charles III of Spain (= 8)
6. Charles IV of Spain
13. Maria Amalia of Saxony (= 9)
3. Maria Isabella of Spain
14. Philip, Duke of Parma
7. Maria Luisa of Parma
15. Louise Élisabeth of France

== See also ==
- Monument to Maria Christina of Bourbon (Madrid)

== Citation ==
Maria Christina of the Two Sicilies House of Bourbon-Two Sicilies Cadet branch of the House of Bourbon Born: 27 April 1806 Died: 22 August 1878
Spanish royalty
Vacant Title last held by Maria Josepha; Amalia of Saxony	Queen consort of Spain; 11 December 1829 – 29 September 1833	Vacant Title next held by Francisco de Asís, Duke of Cádiz as king consort
