= Museum of Romanticism =

Art museum in Madrid, Spain

- Museo del Romanticismo
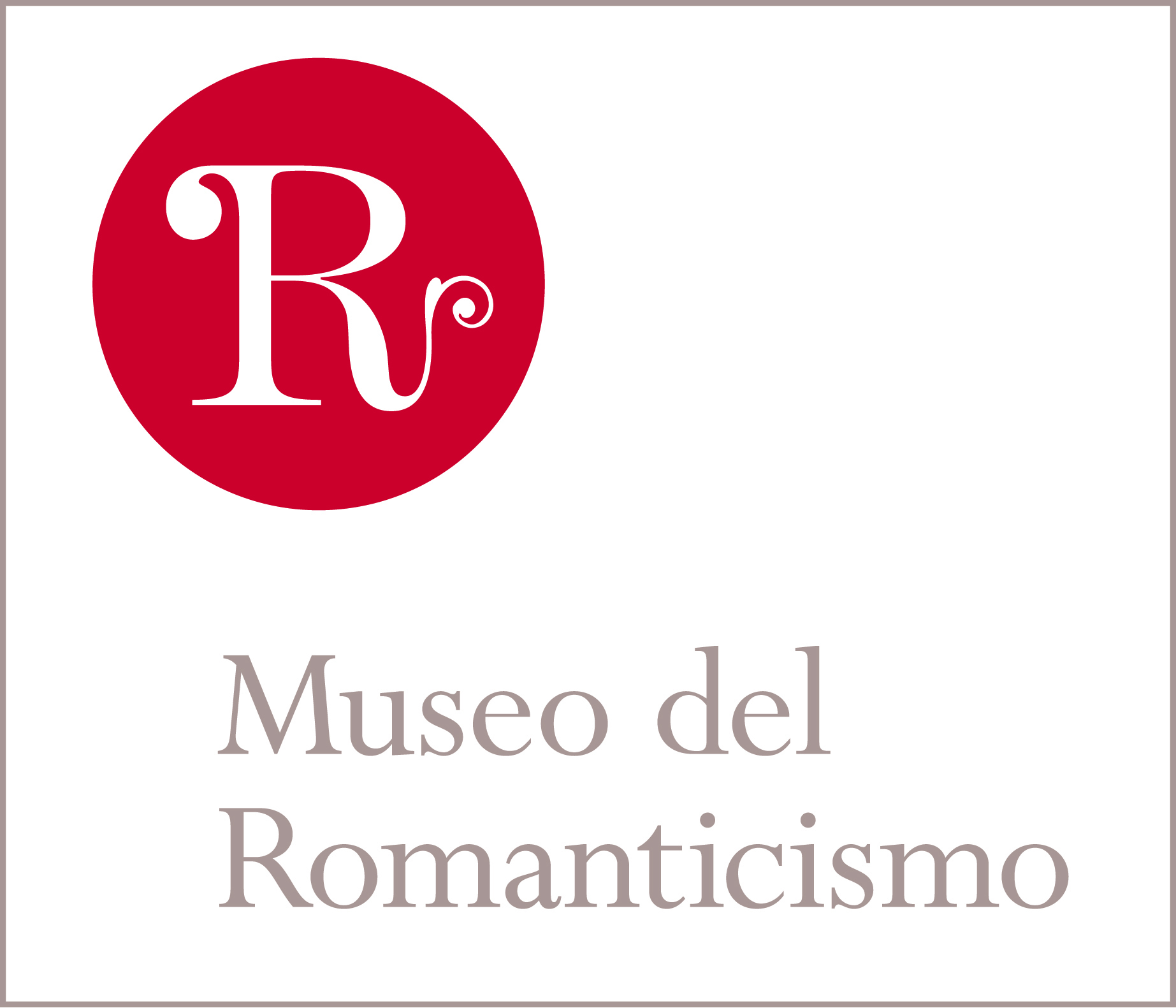

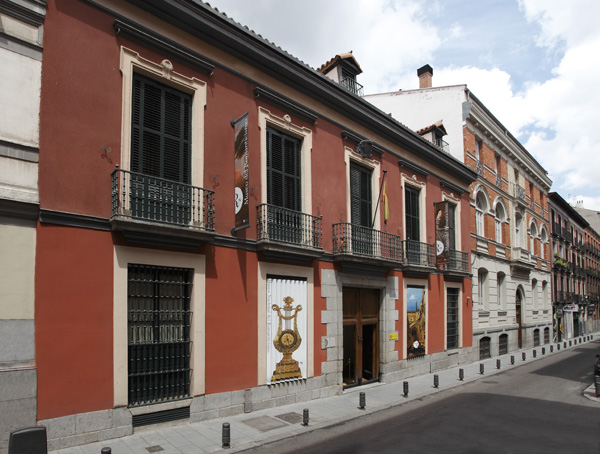
- Main façade of the Museum
- Former name: Museo Romántico
- Established: 1 June 1924
- Location: Calle de San Mateo 13, Madrid, Spain
- Coordinates
- Type: Art museum

Spanish Cultural Heritage
- Official name: Museo del Romanticismo
- Type: Non-movable
- Criteria: Monument
- Designated: 1962
- Reference no.: RI-51-0001381

The Museum of Romanticism (Spanish: Museo del Romanticismo) is an art museum in Madrid, Spain, devoted to Romanticism. It was inaugurated in 1924 as Museo Romántico. It is one of the National Museums of Spain and it is attached to the Ministry of Culture.

== History ==
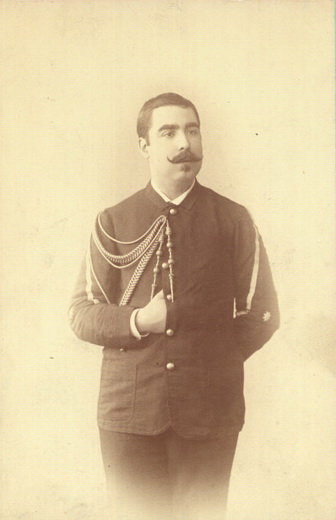
Benigno de la Vega-Inclán, promoter of the museum.

The museum is housed at Calle de San Mateo 13. It was linked since its inception to the patronage of the Marquis of Vega-Inclán. The museum opened on 1 June 1924. The building was purchased by the Spanish State three years after the inauguration of the museum, in 1927. The overseeing institution and the entire collection of the Marquis was bequeathed to the Spanish State after the death of the former in 1942.

The building, dating from the late 18th-century, consists of two stories plus an attic floor, which is not open to the public.

Both the collection and the building were protected as historical-artistic monument in 1962.

The museum's exhibits are presented in the context of a historic house with a dining room, billiard room etc. They include items related to the romantic writer Mariano José de Larra.

In November 2009, the Council of Ministers determined the renaming of the museum to Museo Nacional del Romanticismo.

== Collection ==
Some of the landmark items exhibited at the museum include painting works by Francisco de Goya (San Gregorio Magno), Benjamin de Rolland (Retrato de dos niñas ante un paisaje), Leonardo Alenza (Satira del suicidio romántico, Sátira del suicidio por amor and El dios grande), Valeriano Domínguez Bécquer (El conspirador carlista), Antonio Carnicero (Retrato de Godoy), José Aparicio (Desembarco de Fernando VII), Joaquín Espalter (La familia Flaquer), Vicente López Portaña (Retrato del Marqués de Remisa), Antonio María Esquivel (El general Prim a caballo and Retrato de Alfredito Romea), Eugenio Lucas Velázquez (Cueva de bandidos), Charles Porion (Isabel II pasando revista a las tropas), Federico de Madrazo y Kuntz (Retrato del Duque de Rivas, Retrato de la Duquesa de Rivas, and Retrato de Julián Romea), José de Madrazo (Retrato de Fernando VII a caballo), Jenaro Pérez Villaamil (Puerta de Serranos en Valencia), Joaquín Sorolla (Retrato del Marqués de la Vega-Inclán), Manuel Cabral Bejarano (La copla), José Gutiérrez de la Vega (Retrato de Isabel II and Retrato de Larra) and Francisco de Zurbarán (San Francisco).

== Gallery paintings ==
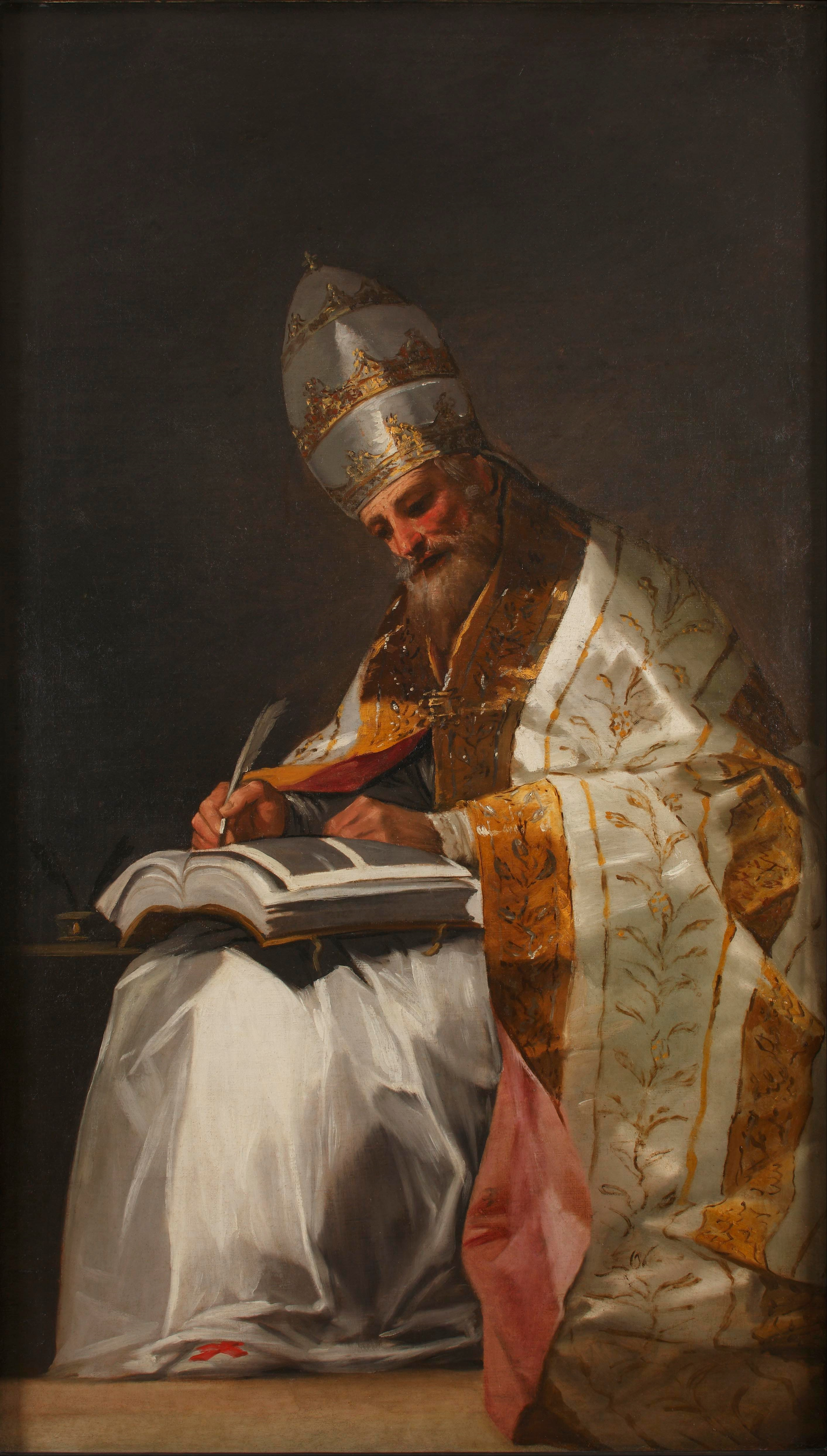
Francisco de Goya, San Gregorio Magno

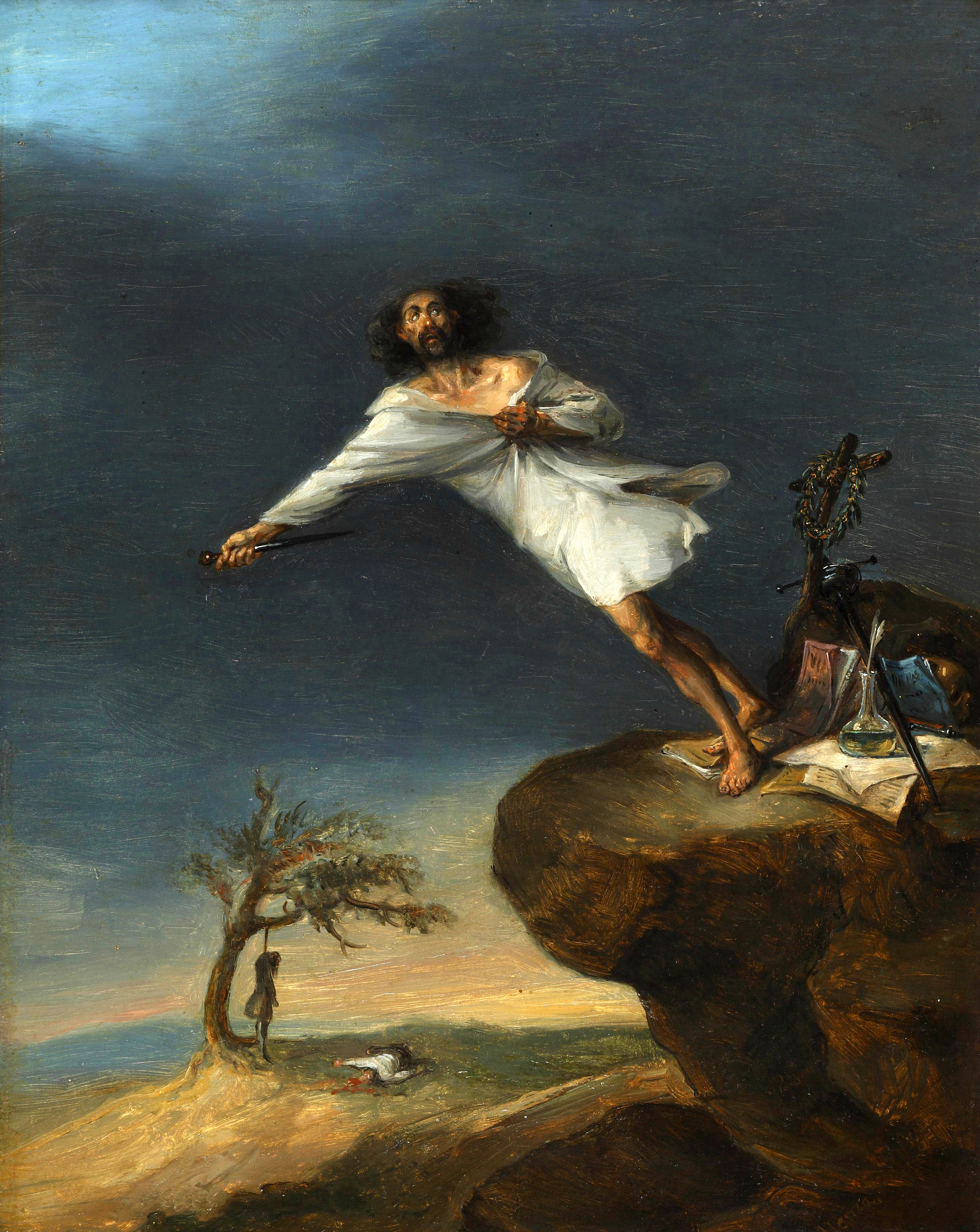
Leonardo Alenza, Sátira del suicidio romántico

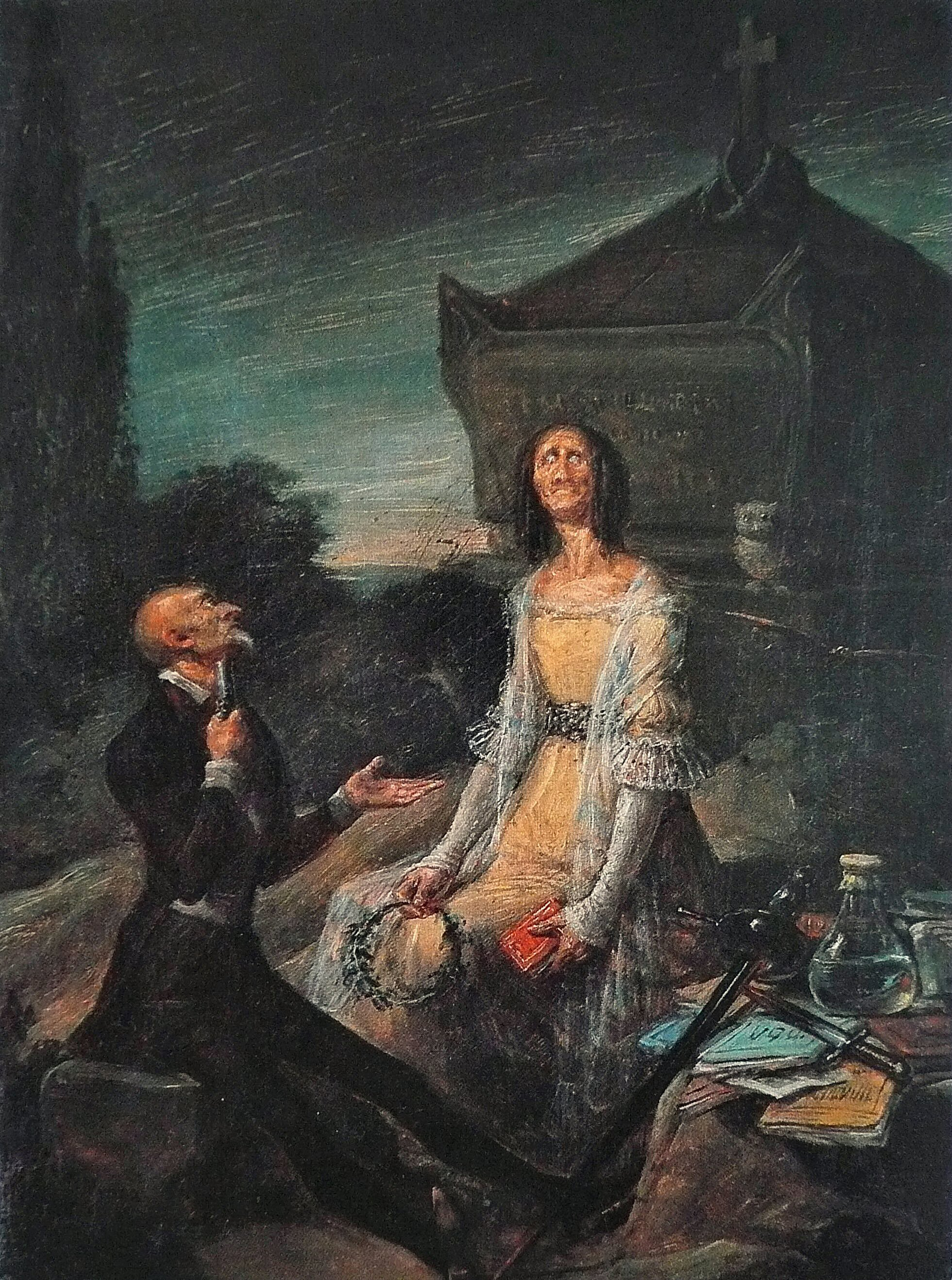
Leonardo Alenza, Sátira del suicido por amor

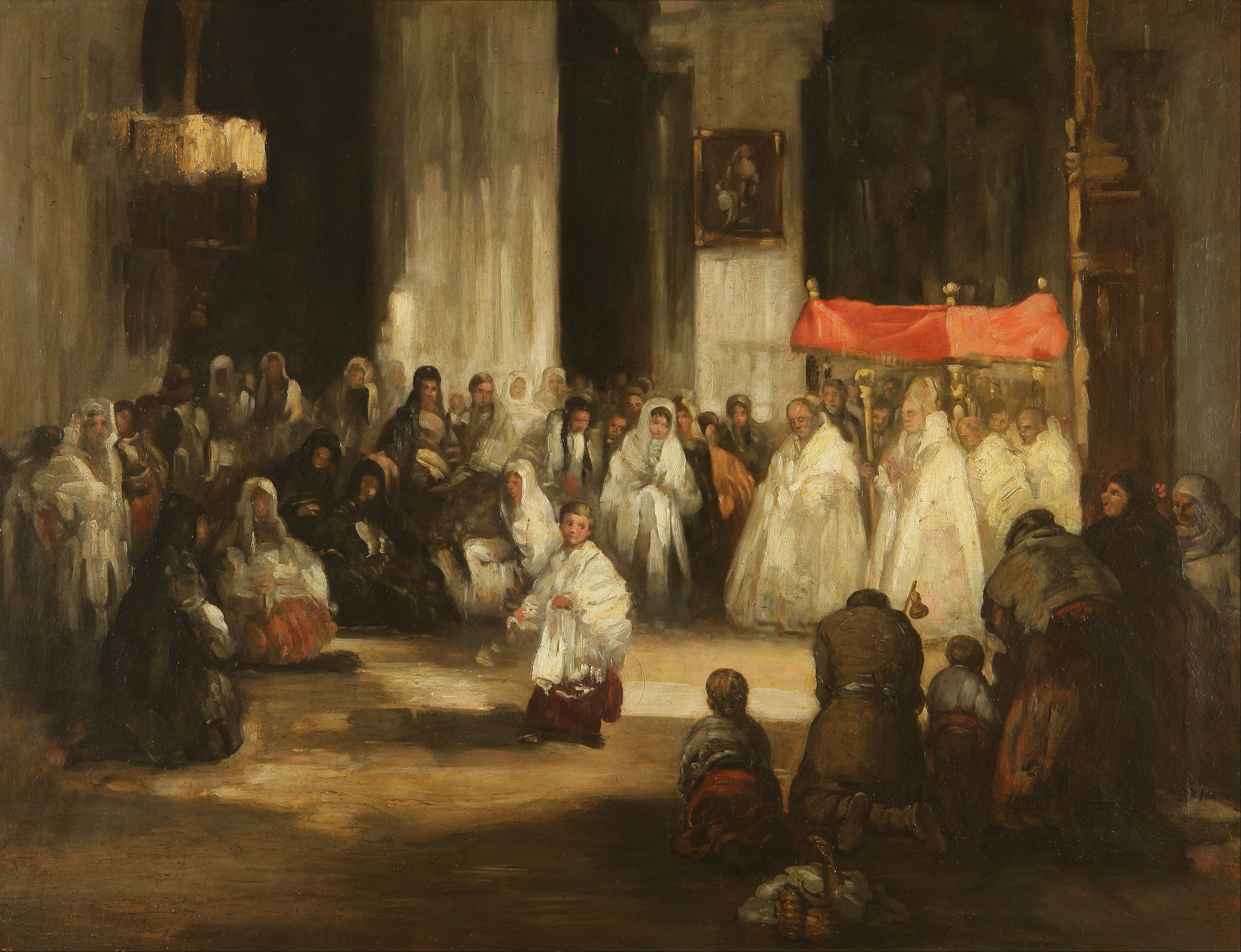
Leonardo Alenza, El dios grande

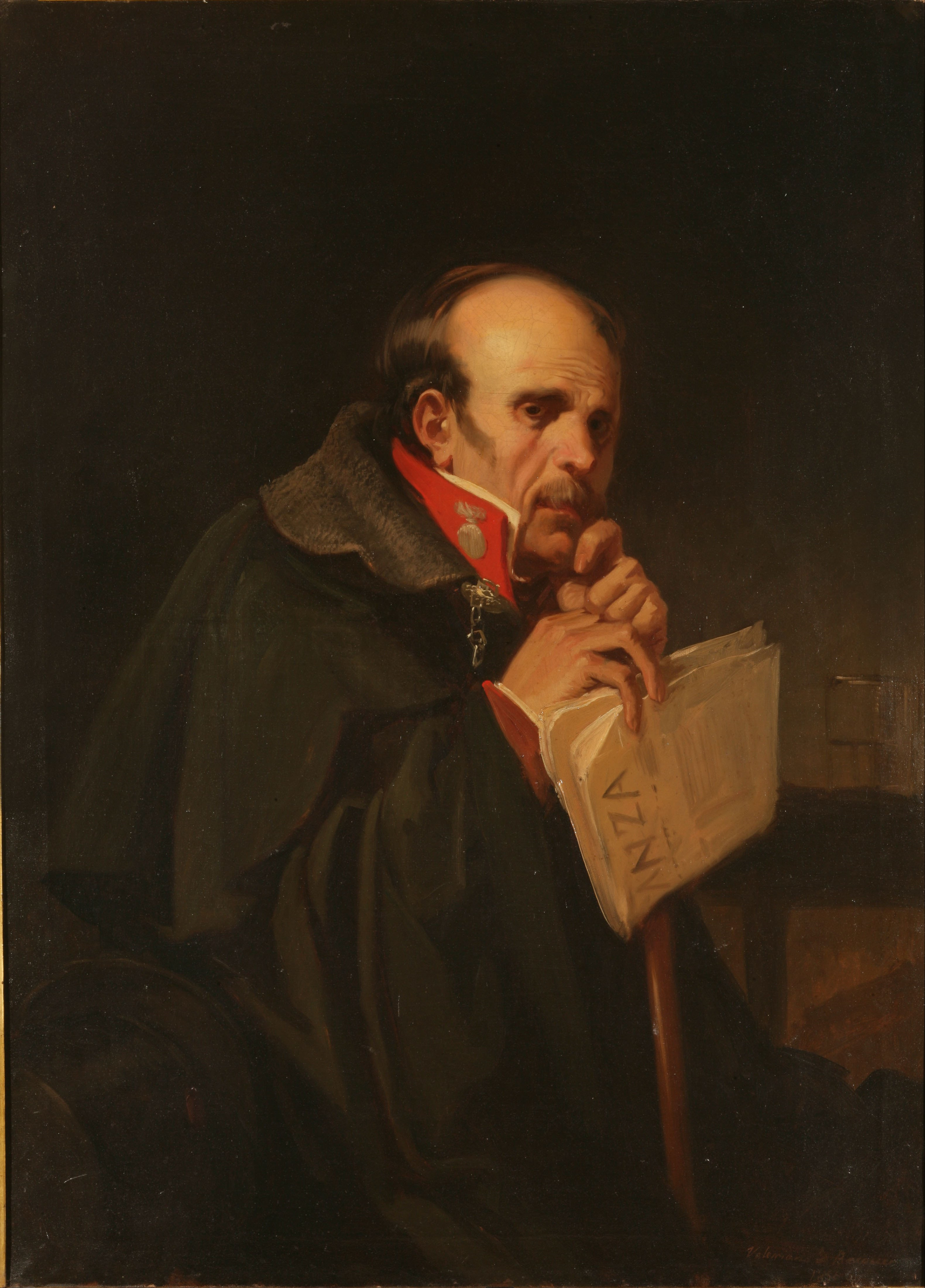
Valeriano Domínguez Bécquer, The carlist conspirator

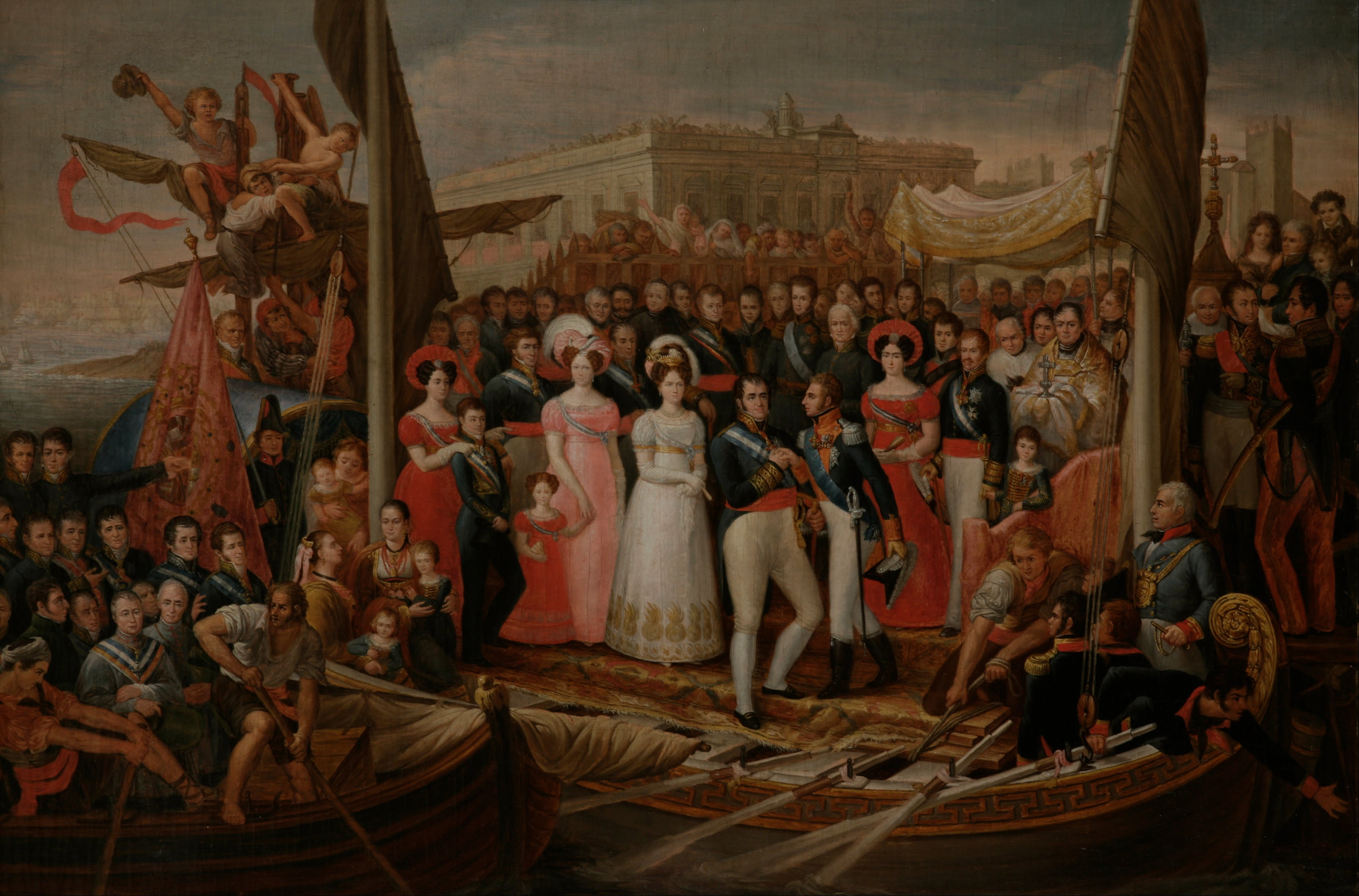
José Aparicio, The Landing of Ferdinand VII in El Puerto de Santa María

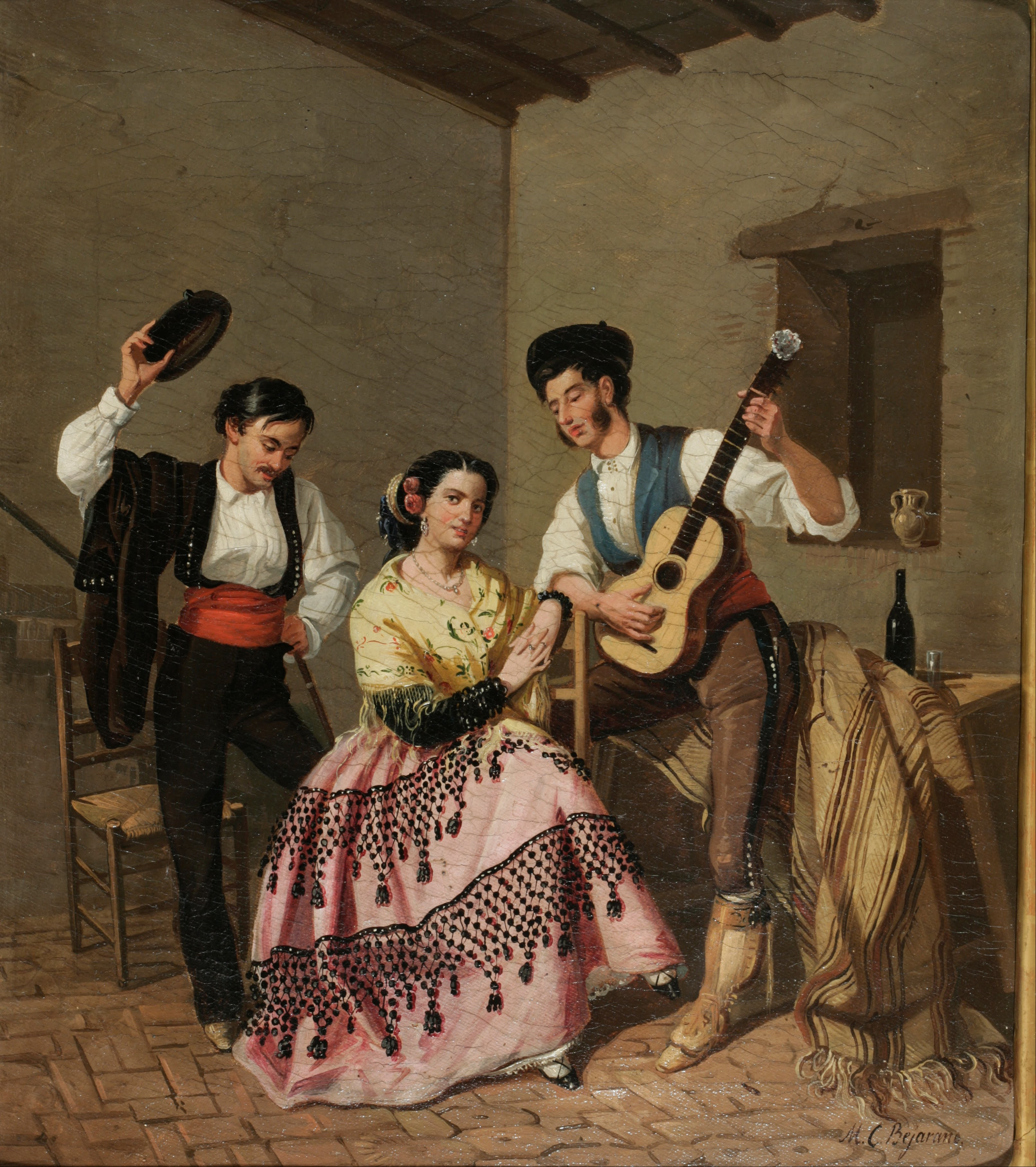
Manuel Cabral Bejarano, La copla

== Museum galleries ==
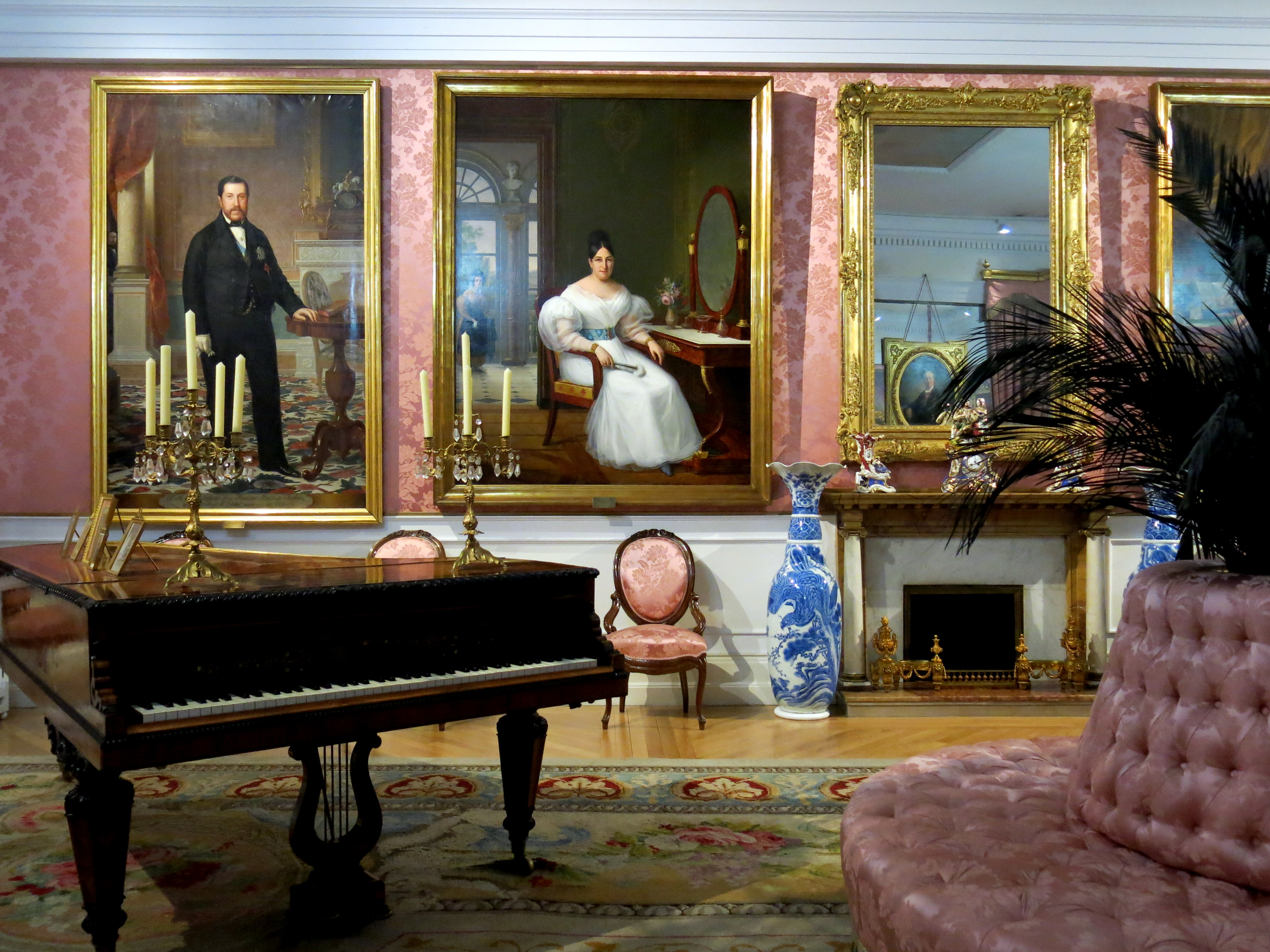

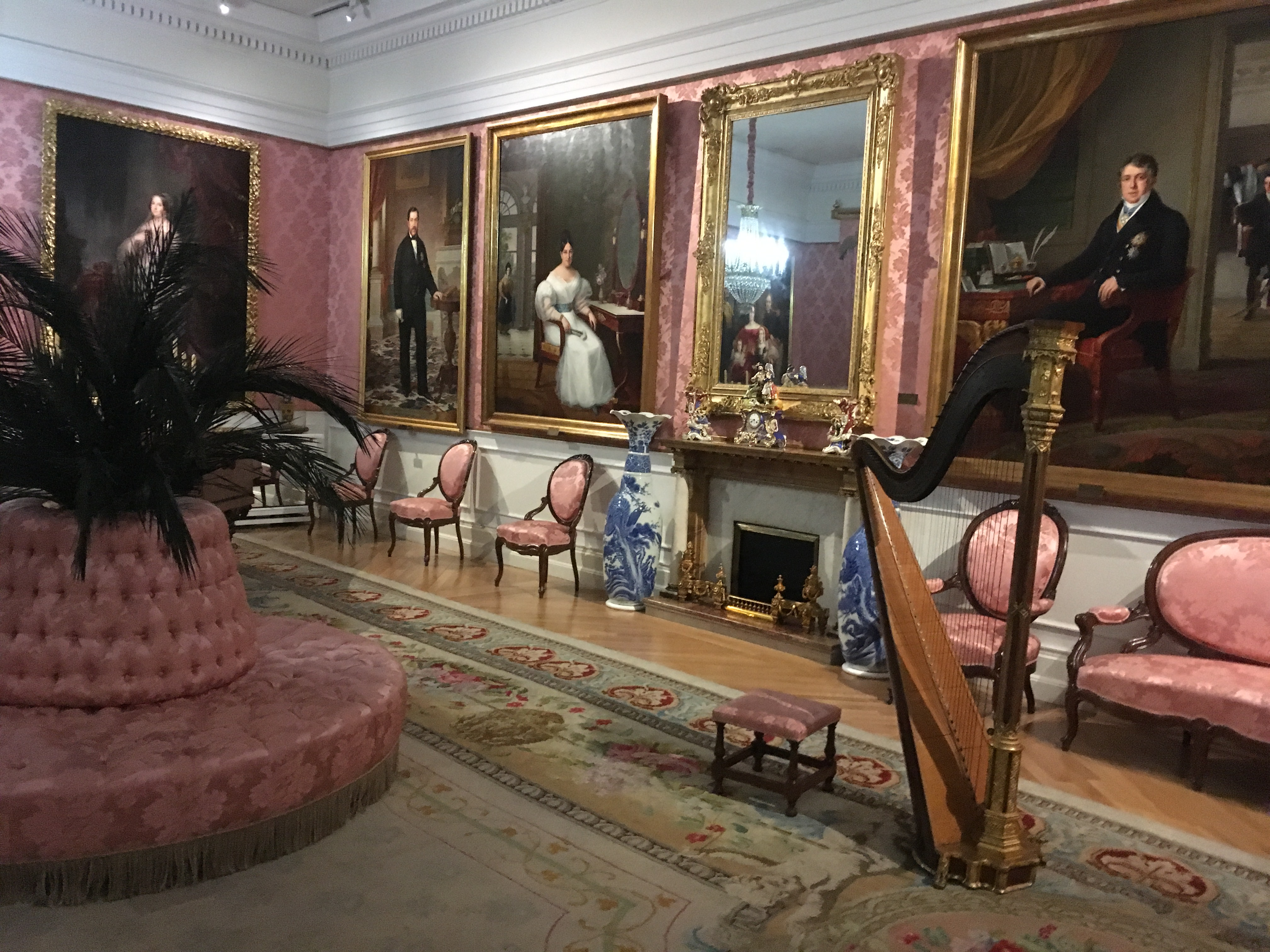

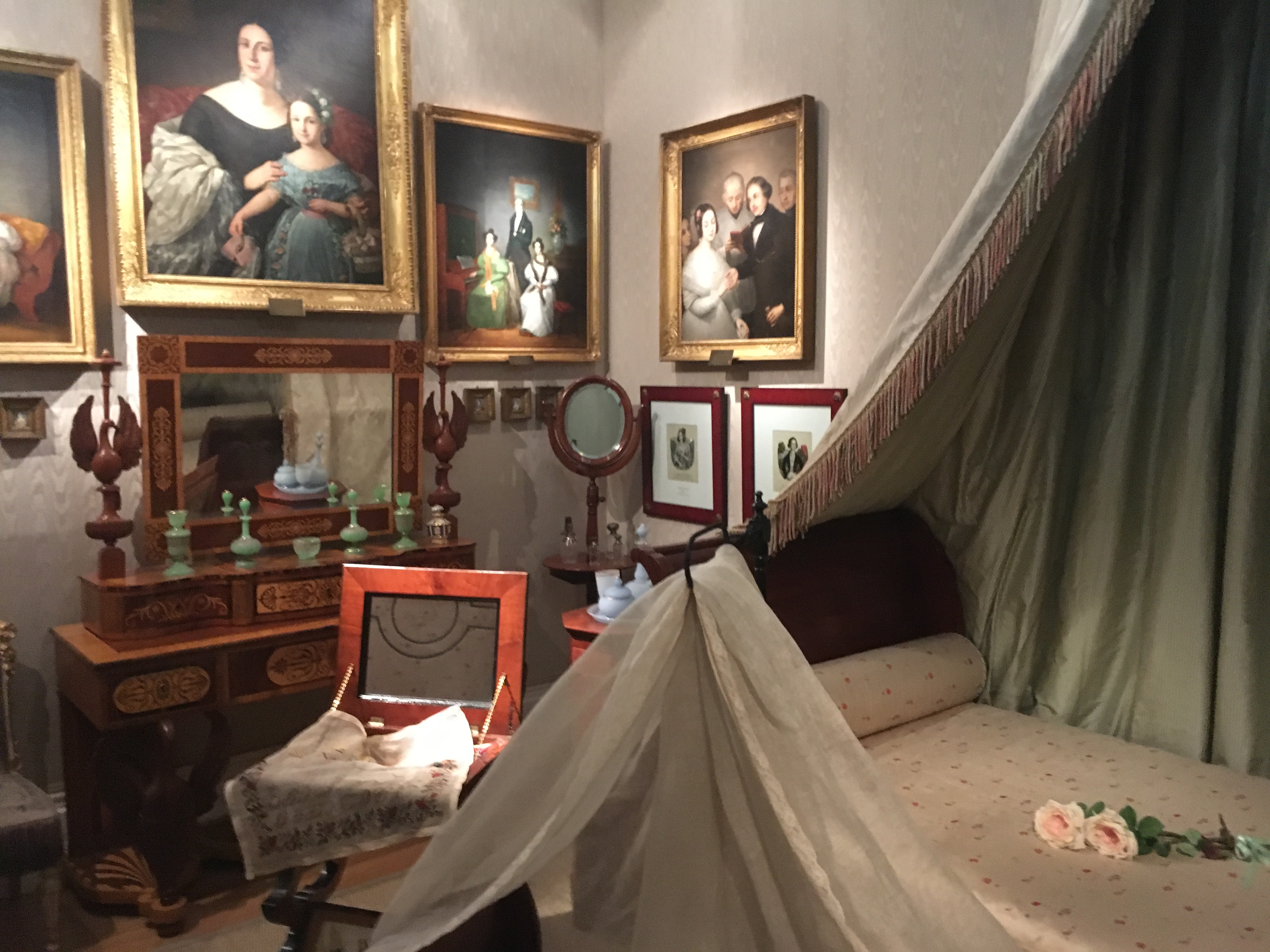

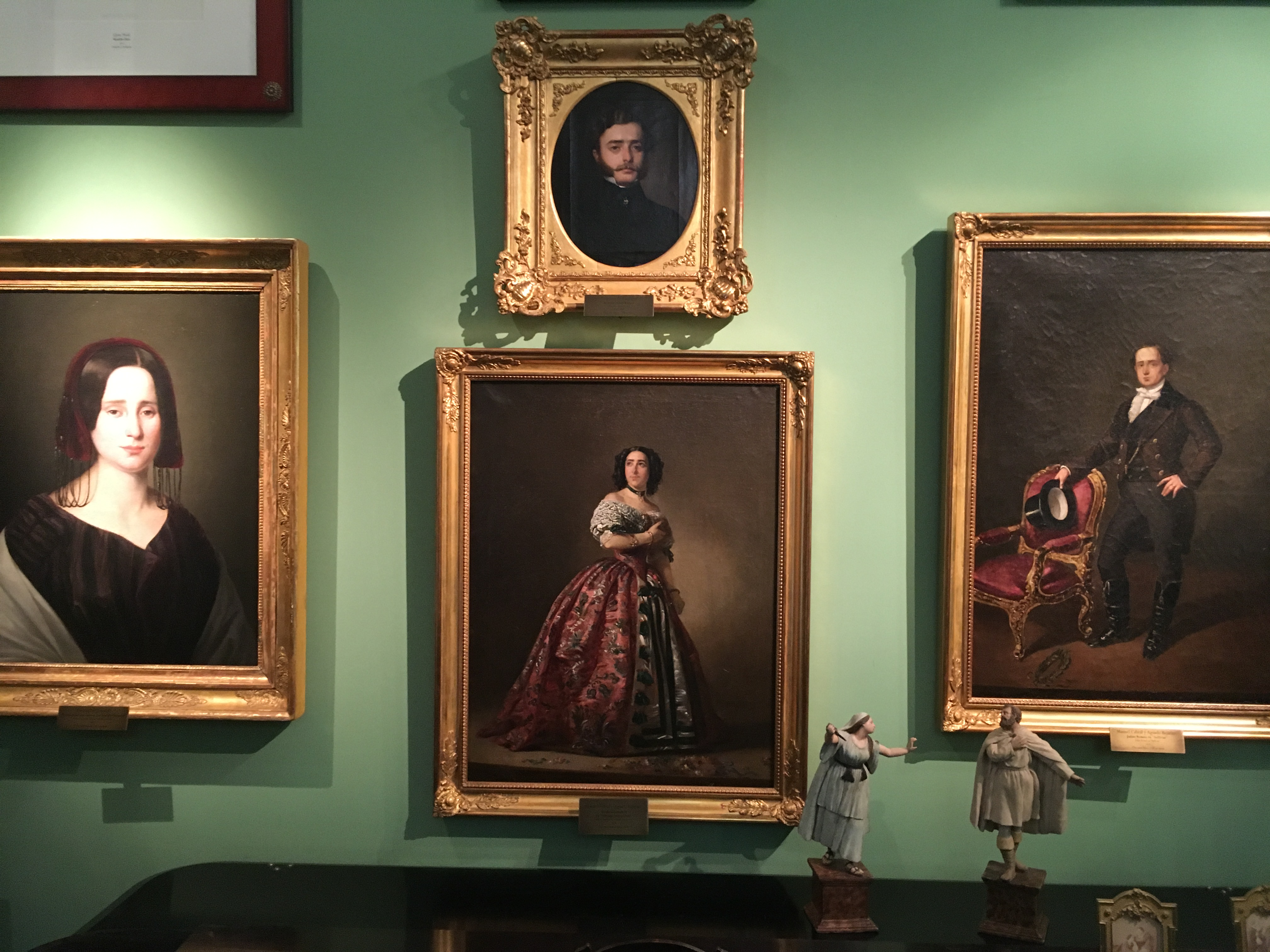

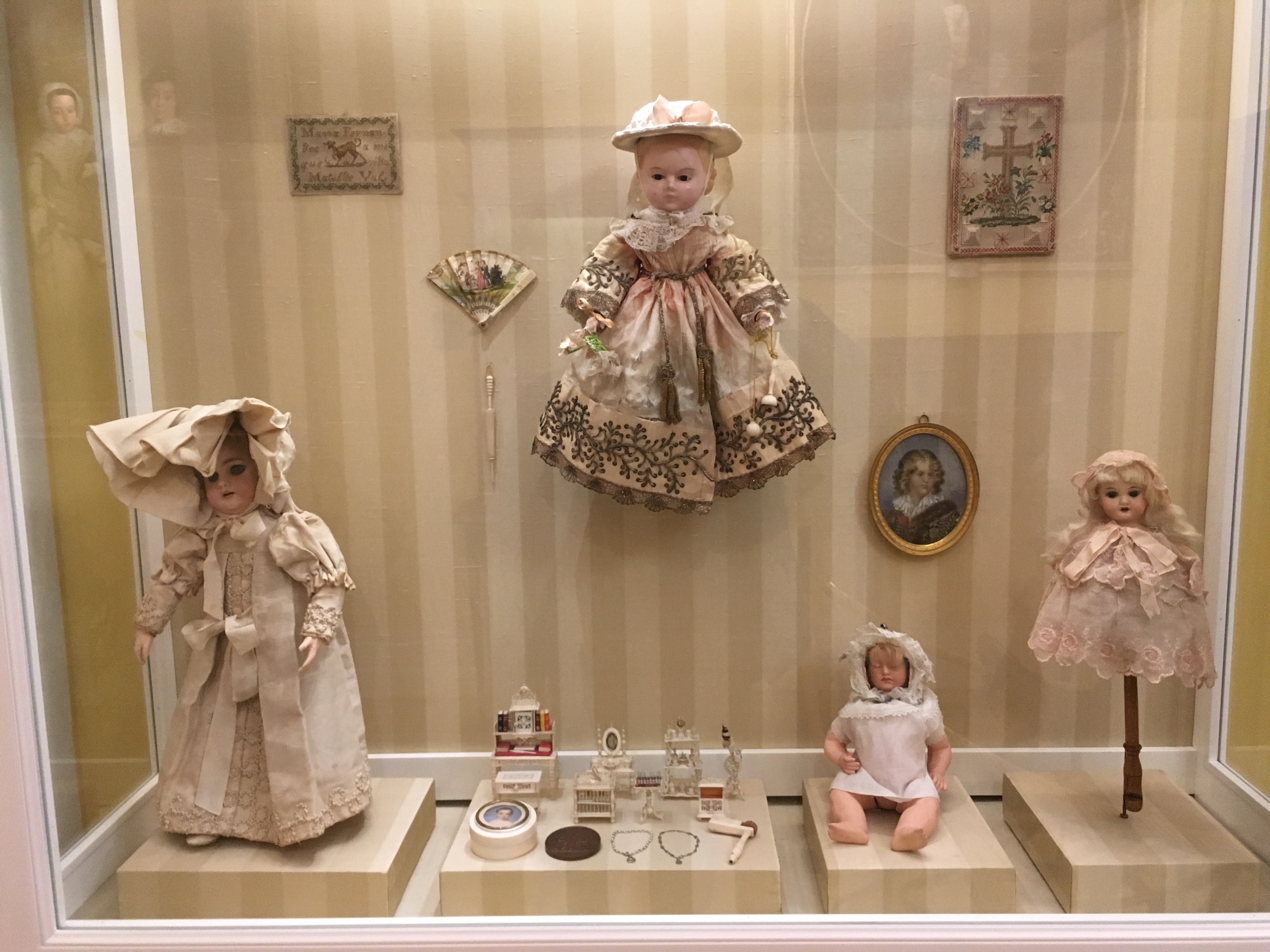
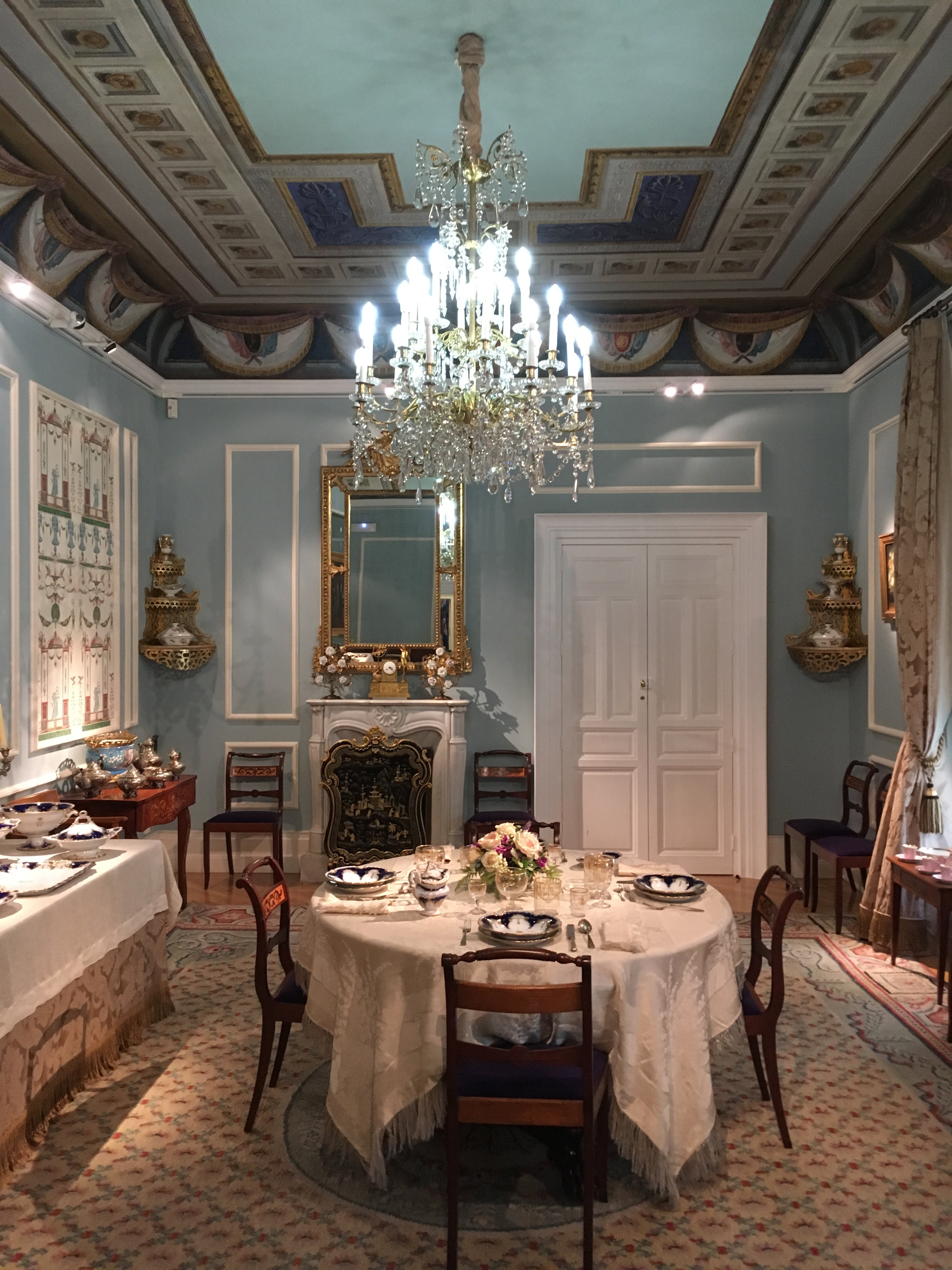

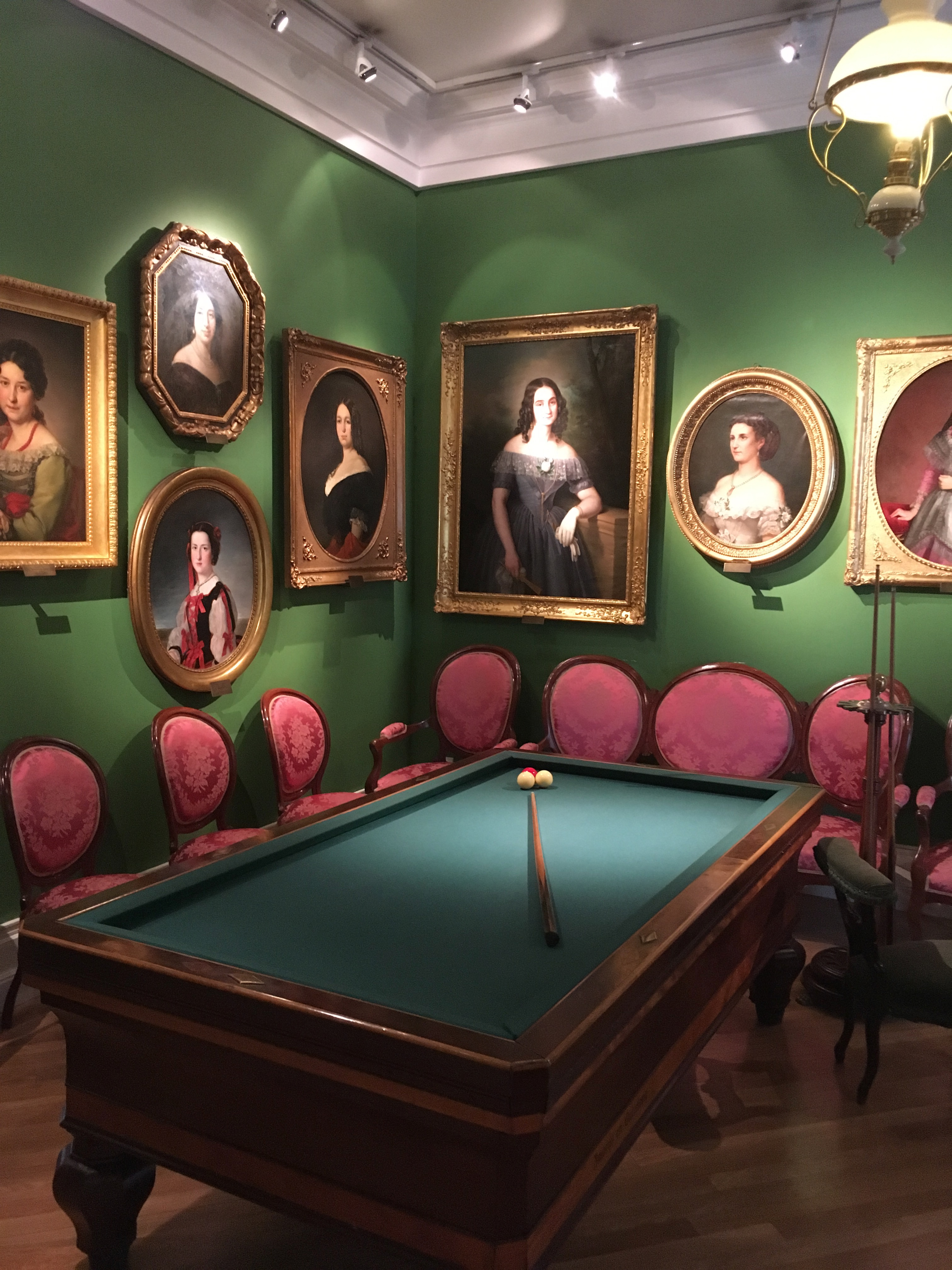

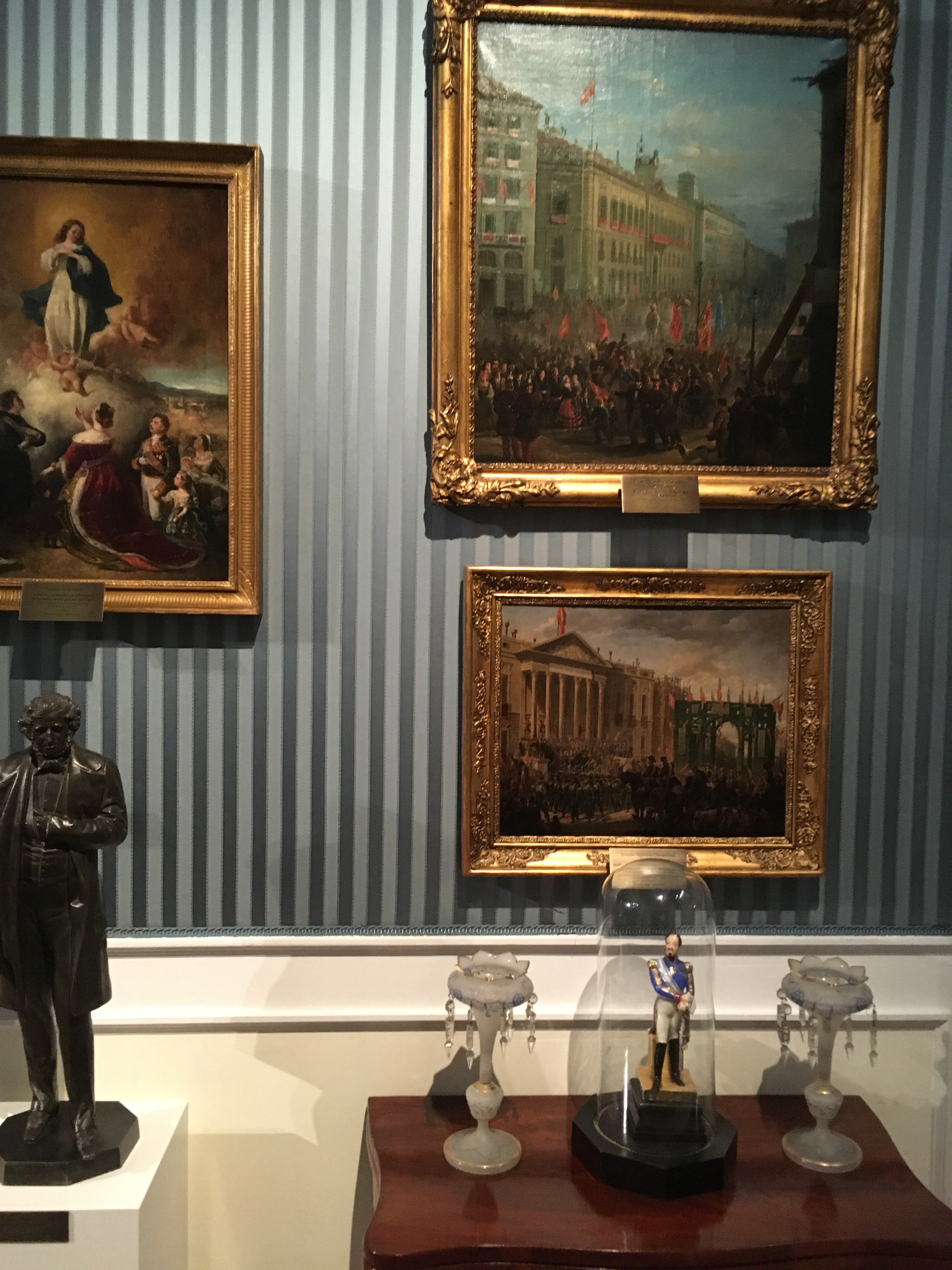

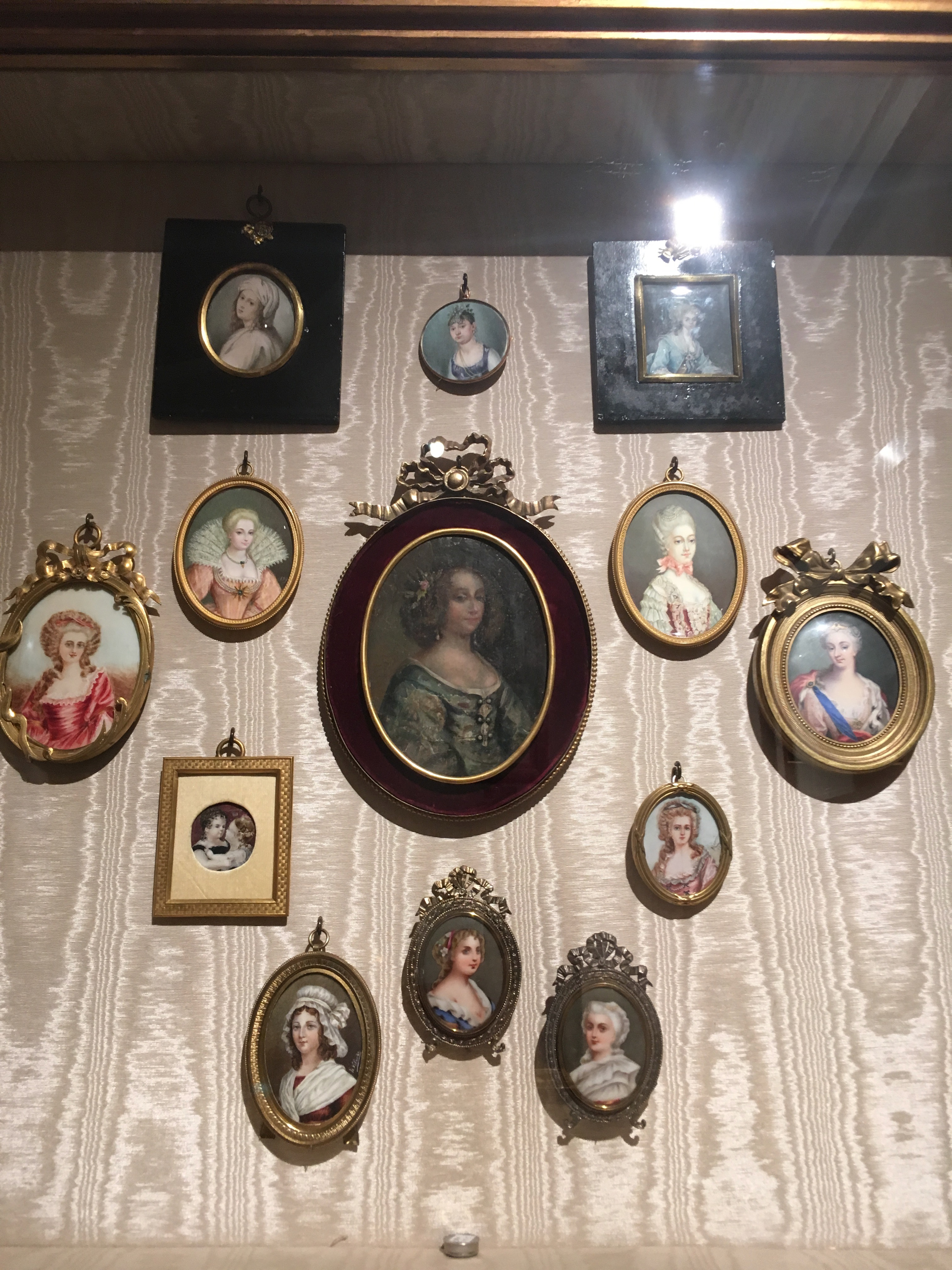
