= Ferdinand VII =

King of Spain (1808, 1813–1833)

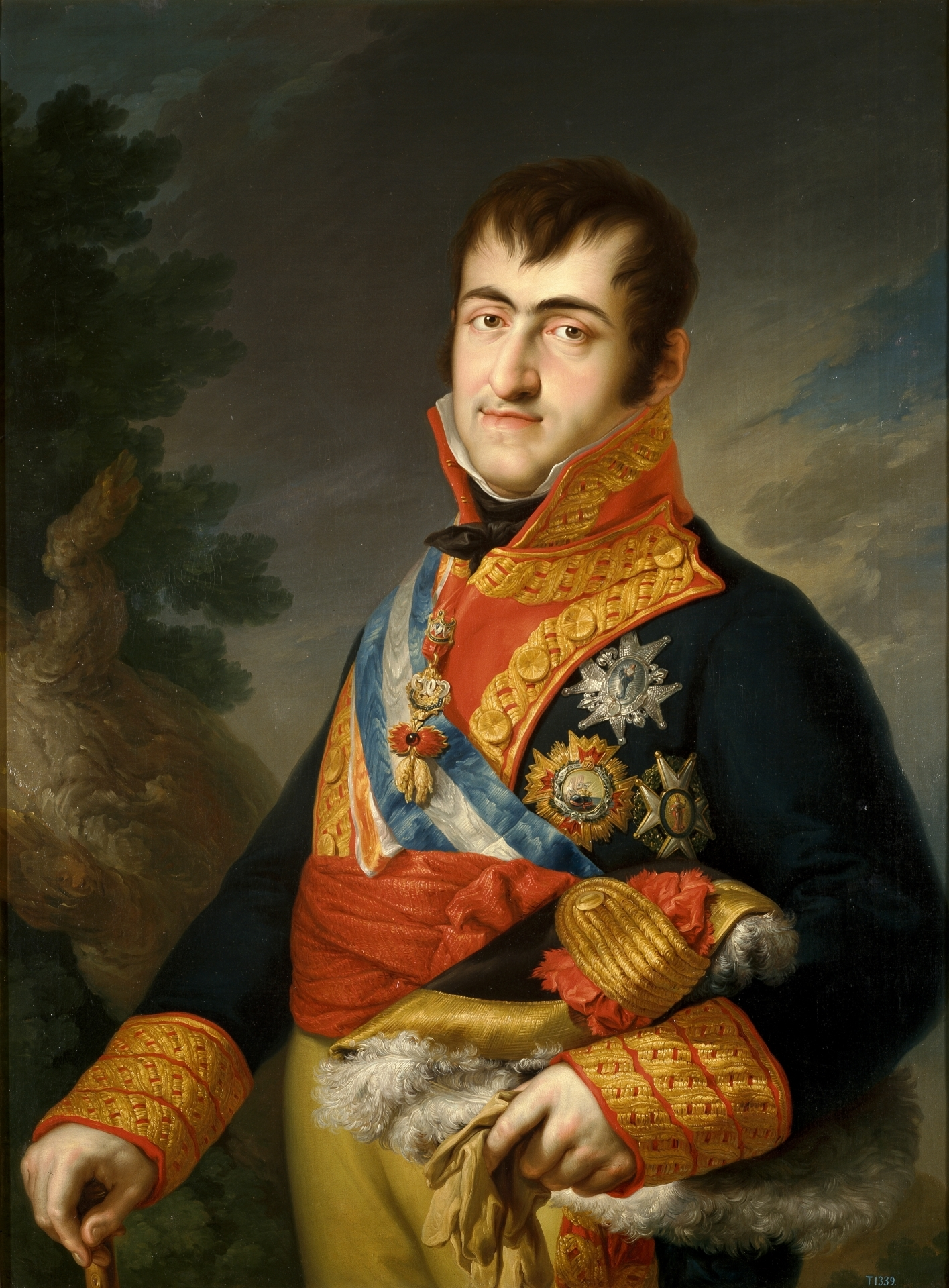
- Portrait by Vicente López Portaña, c. 1814–15

King of Spain
- 2nd reign: 11 December 1813 – 29 September 1833
- Predecessor: Joseph I
- Successor: Isabella II
- Prime ministers: See list: Víctor Damián Sáez (1823–1823); The Marquess of Casa Irujo (1823–1823); The Count of Ofalia (1823–1824); Francisco Cea Bermúdez (1824–1825); The Duke of the Infantado (1825–1826); Manuel González Salmón (1826–1832); The Count of la Alcudia (1833–1833)
- 1st reign: 19 March 1808 – 6 May 1808
- Predecessor: Charles IV
- Successor: Joseph I
- Born: 14 October 1784; El Escorial, Spain
- Died: 29 September 1833 (aged 48); Madrid, Spain
- Burial: El Escorial
- Spouses: Maria Antonia of Naples and Sicily (m. 1802; died 1806) Maria Isabel of Portugal (m. 1816; died 1818) Maria Josepha Amalia of Saxony (m. 1819; died 1829) Maria Christina of the Two Sicilies (m. 1829)
- Issue Detail: Isabella II; Infanta Luisa Fernanda, Duchess of Montpensier
Names
- Spanish: Fernando Francisco de Paula Domingo Vincente Ferrer Antonio José Joaquín Pascual Diego Juan Nepomuceno Januario Francisco Javier Rafael Miguel Gabriel Calisto Cayetano Fausto Luis Raimundo Gregorio Lorenzo Jerónimo de Borbón y Borbón-Parma
- House: Bourbon
- Father: Charles IV of Spain
- Mother: Maria Luisa of Parma

Ferdinand VII (Spanish: Fernando VII; 14 October 1784 – 29 September 1833) was King of Spain and the Indies during the early 19th century, and king of the Spains during the Spanish liberal period. He reigned as a prisoner of Napoleon, in absentia, or without effective sovereignty during the periods of Spanish liberalism, 1808–1813 and 1820–1823 (Trienio Liberal). Before 1813, he was known as el Deseado (the Desired), and after, as el Rey Felón (the Felon King).

Born in Madrid at El Escorial, Ferdinand was heir apparent to the Spanish throne in his youth. Following the 1808 Tumult of Aranjuez, he ascended the throne. That year, Napoleon overthrew him; he linked his monarchy to counter-revolution and reactionary policies that produced a deep rift in Spain between his forces on the right and liberals on the left. Back in power in December 1813, he re-established the absolutist monarchy and rejected the liberal constitution of 1812. A revolt in 1820 led by Rafael del Riego forced him to restore the constitution, starting the Liberal Triennium, a three-year period of liberal rule. In 1823, the Congress of Verona authorised a successful French intervention, restoring him to absolute power for the second time. He suppressed the liberal press from 1814 to 1833, jailing many of its editors and writers.

Under his rule, the liberal revolution took place throughout the Spanish Empire; Spanish America obtained its independence and Spain entered into a large-scale civil war upon his death. His political legacy has remained contested since his death; some historians regard him as incompetent, despotic, and short-sighted.

== Early life ==
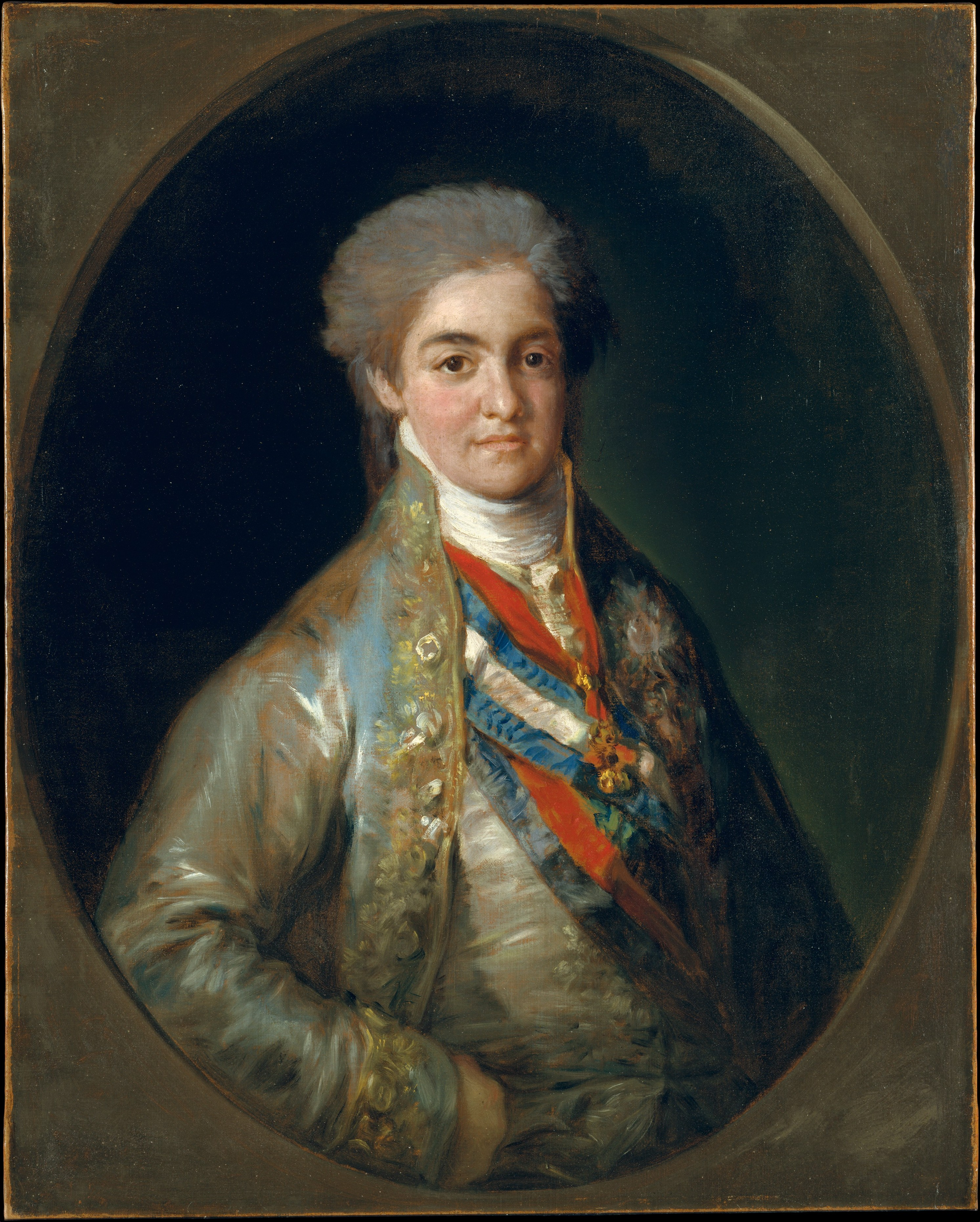
Young Ferdinand as Prince of Asturias, 1800

Ferdinand was the eldest surviving son of Charles IV of Spain and Maria Luisa of Parma. He was born in the palace of El Escorial near Madrid. In his youth, he occupied the position of an heir apparent excluded from any participation in government by his parents and their favourite advisor and Prime Minister, Manuel Godoy. National discontent with the government produced a rebellion in 1805. In October 1807, Ferdinand was arrested for his complicity in the El Escorial Conspiracy in which the rebels aimed at securing foreign support from the French Emperor Napoleon. When the conspiracy was discovered, he submitted to his parents.

== First reign and abdication ==
Royal monogram

Following a popular riot at Aranjuez, Charles IV abdicated in March 1808. Ferdinand ascended the throne and turned to Napoleon for support. He abdicated on 6 May 1808, and thereafter Napoleon kept Ferdinand under guard in France for six years at the Château de Valençay. Historian Charles Oman records that the choice of Valençay was a practical joke by Napoleon on his former foreign minister Talleyrand, the owner of the château, for his lack of interest in Spanish affairs.

While the upper echelons of the Spanish government accepted his abdication and Napoleon's choice of his brother Joseph Bonaparte as king of Spain, the Spanish people did not. Uprisings broke out throughout the country, marking the beginning of the Peninsular War. Provincial juntas were established to control regions in opposition to the new French king. After the Battle of Bailén proved that the Spanish could resist the French, the Council of Castile reversed itself and declared null and void the abdications of Bayonne on 11 August 1808. On 24 August, Ferdinand VII was proclaimed king of Spain again, and negotiations between the council and the provincial juntas for the establishment of a Supreme Central Junta were completed. On 14 January 1809, the British government acknowledged Ferdinand VII as king of Spain.

== Second reign ==
=== Restoration ===
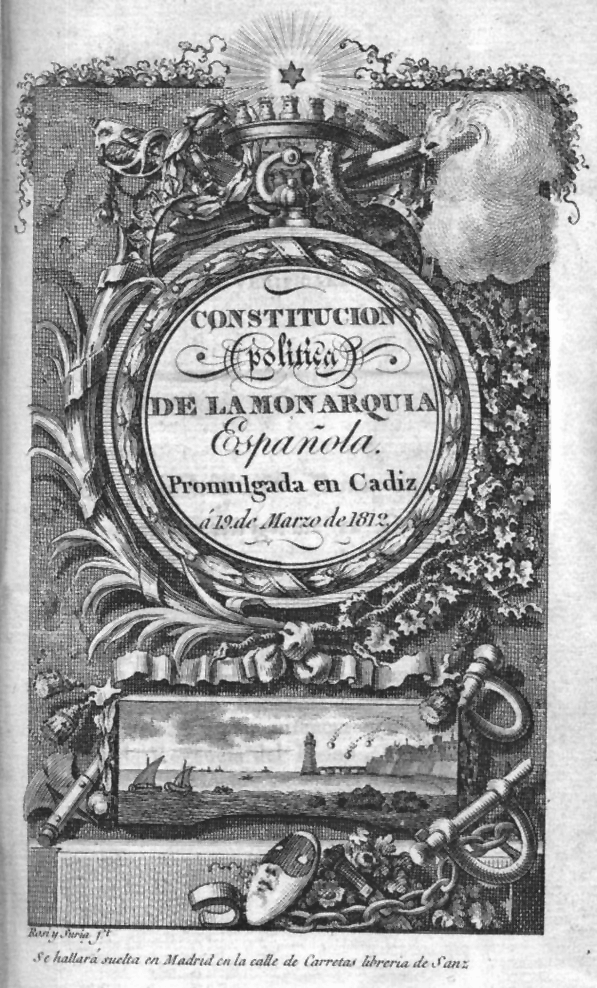
Constitution of 1812

Five years later, after experiencing serious setbacks on many fronts, Napoleon agreed on 11 December 1813 to acknowledge Ferdinand VII as king of Spain, and signed the Treaty of Valençay so that the king could return to Spain. The Spanish people, blaming the policies of the Francophiles (afrancesados) for causing the Napoleonic occupation and the Peninsular War by allying Spain too closely to France, at first welcomed Fernando. Ferdinand soon found that in the intervening years a new world had been born of foreign invasion and domestic revolution. In his name, Spain fought for its independence and in his name as well juntas had governed Spanish America. Spain was no longer the absolute monarchy it had been when he had relinquished six years earlier. Instead, he was now asked to rule under the liberal Constitution of 1812. Before being allowed onto Spanish soil, Ferdinand had to guarantee the liberals that he would govern on the basis of the constitution, but he only gave lukewarm indications that he would do so.

On 24 March, the French handed him over to the Spanish Army in Girona, and thus began his procession towards Madrid. During this process and in the following months, he was encouraged by conservatives and the Church hierarchy to reject the constitution. On 4 May, he ordered its abolition, and on 10 May had the liberal leaders responsible for the constitution arrested. Ferdinand justified his actions by claiming that the constitution had been made by a Cortes illegally assembled in his absence, without his consent and without the traditional form. (It had met as a unicameral body, instead of in three chambers representing the three estates: the clergy, the nobility and the cities.) Ferdinand initially promised to convene a traditional Cortes, but never did so, thereby reasserting the Bourbon doctrine that sovereign authority resided in his person only.

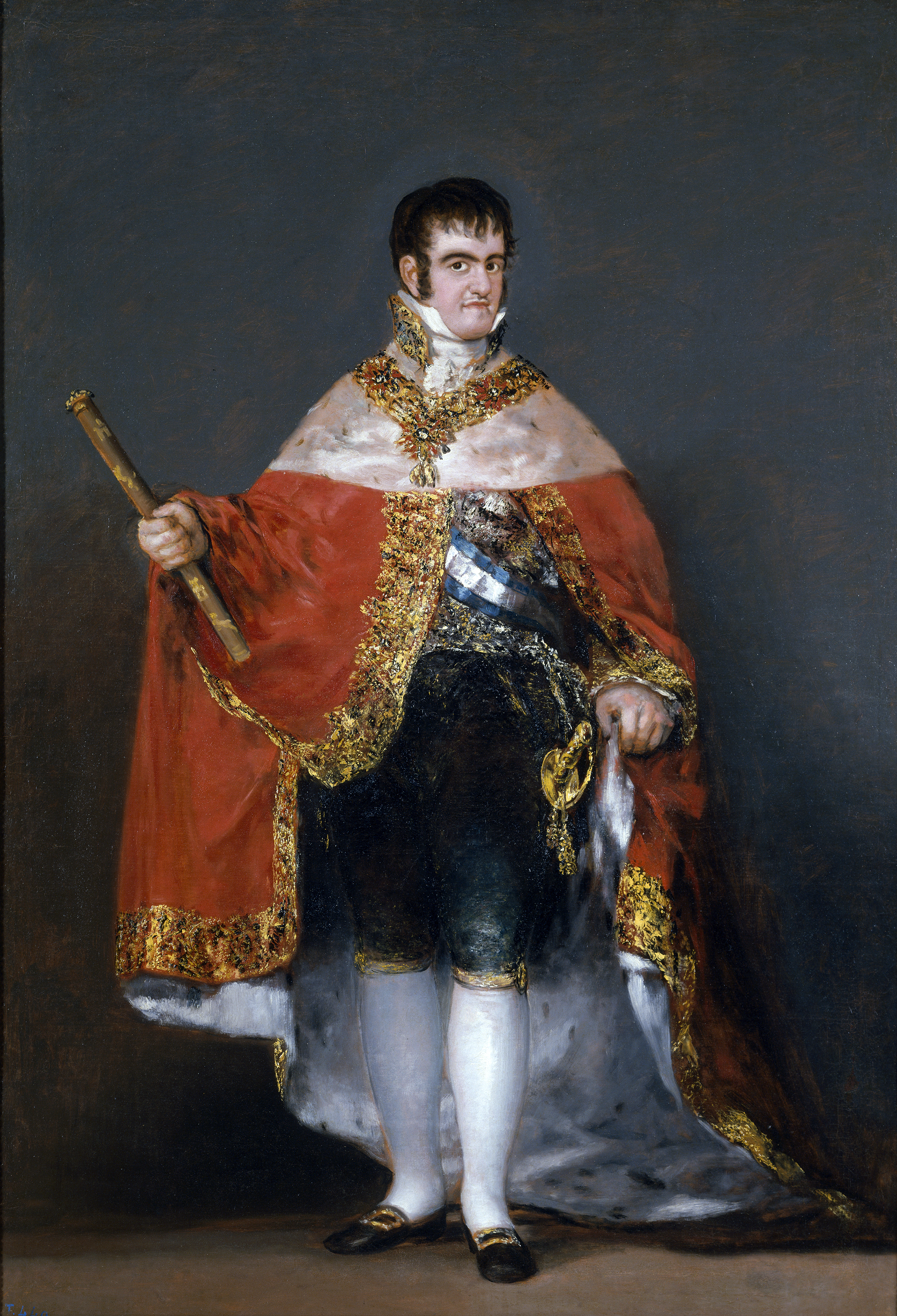
Portrait of Ferdinand VII of Spain in his robes of state by Francisco Goya (1815), Prado

Meanwhile, the wars of independence had broken out in the Americas, and although many of the republican rebels were divided and royalist sentiment was strong in many areas, the Spanish treasure fleets – carrying tax revenues from the Spanish Empire – were interrupted. Spain was all but bankrupt.

Ferdinand's restored autocracy was guided by a small camarilla of his favourites, although his government seemed unstable. Whimsical and ferocious by turns, he changed his ministers every few months. "The king," wrote Friedrich von Gentz in 1814, "himself enters the houses of his prime ministers, arrests them, and hands them over to their cruel enemies;" and again, on 14 January 1815, "the king has so debased himself that he has become no more than the leading police agent and prison warden of his country."

The king did recognise the efforts of foreign powers on his behalf. As the head of the Spanish Order of the Golden Fleece, Ferdinand made the Duke of Wellington, head of the British forces on the peninsula, the first Protestant member of the order.

During the aftermath of the Mexican War of Independence, the general of the Army of the Three Guarantees, Agustín de Iturbide, and Jefe Superior Juan O'Donojú, signed in 1821 the Treaty of Córdoba, which concluded the war of independence and established the First Mexican Empire. The imperial constitution contemplated that the monarch would be "a Spanish prince," and Iturbide and O'Donojú intended to offer the Mexican Imperial Crown to Ferdinand VII himself to rule Mexico in personal union with Spain. However, Ferdinand, refusing to recognise Mexican independence or be bound by a constitution, decreed that the Mexican constitution was "void", declined the Mexican crown, and stated that no European prince could accede to the Mexican throne. The imperial crown was consequently given to Iturbide himself, but the Mexican Empire collapsed and was replaced by the First Mexican Republic a few years later.

=== Revolt ===
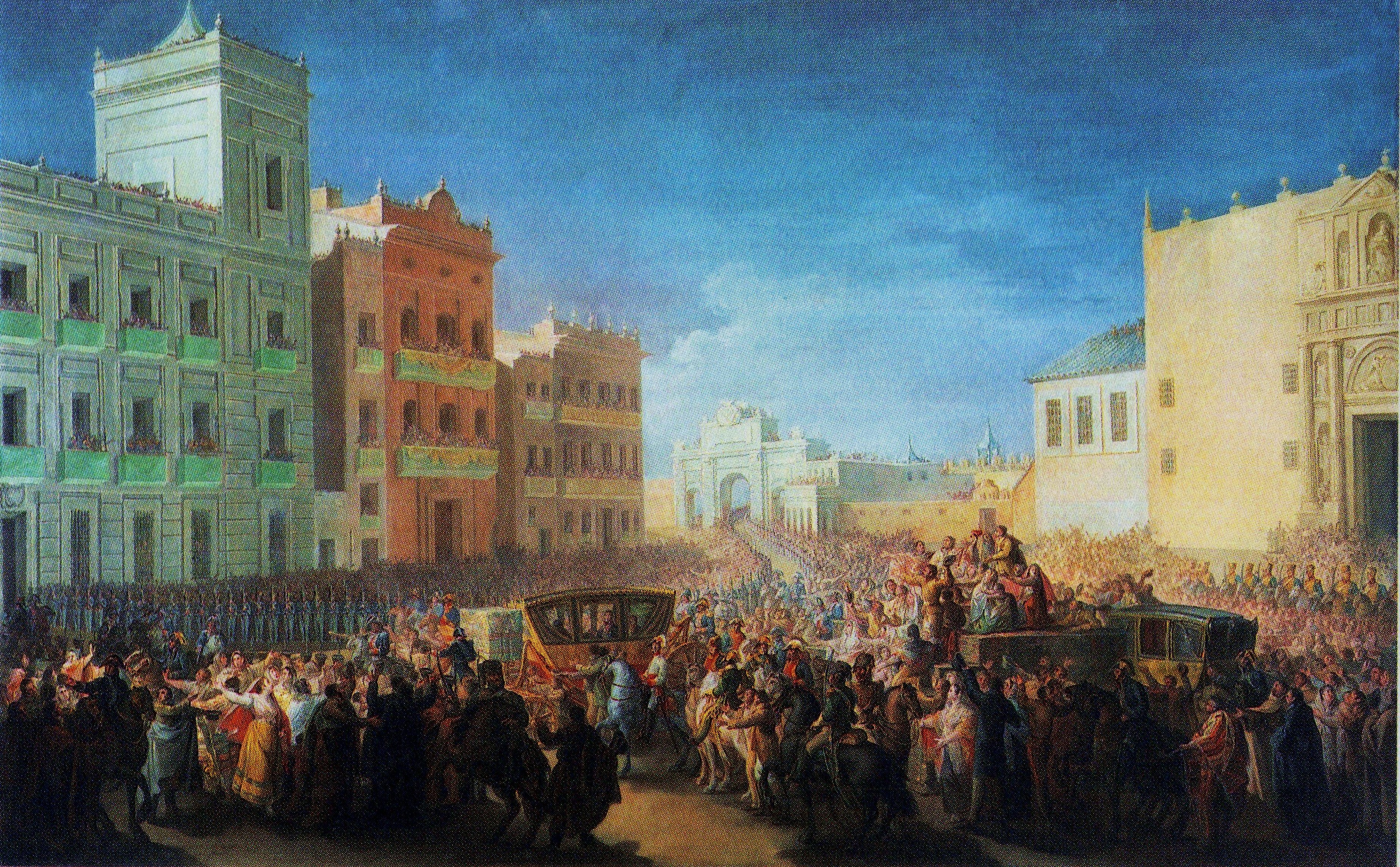
Triumphal welcome of Ferdinand at Valencia, 1815

There were several pronunciamientos, or military uprisings, during the king's second reign. The first came in September 1814, three months after the end of the Peninsular War, and was led by General Espoz y Mina in Pamplona. Juan Díaz Porlier revolted at La Coruña in the following year. General Luis Lacy led an uprising in Barcelona in 1817, and General Juan Van Halen did the same in Valencia in 1818. In 1820 Rafael del Riego undertook the most successful pronunciamiento, leading to the Trienio Liberal.

In 1820, a revolt broke out in favour of the Constitution of 1812, beginning with a mutiny of the troops under Riego. The king was quickly taken prisoner. Ferdinand had restored the Jesuits upon his return, but now they had become identified with repression and absolutism among the liberals, who attacked them: twenty-five Jesuits were slain in Madrid in 1822. For the rest of the 19th century, liberal political regimes expelled the Jesuits, and authoritarian regimes reinstated them.

Ferdinand VII was an ardent opponent of Freemasonry in Spain, seeing it as a vehicle for secular liberal revolutions, an enemy of the Spanish Crown, aristocracy and the Catholic faith, subordinated to foreign interests (the Grand Orient of France primarily). After reinstating the Spanish Inquisition and the Jesuits, on 4 May 1814, he publicly declared all Spanish freemasons to be traitors. The same year, Pope Pius VII issued a decree against Freemasonry, approved by Ferdinand VII and became an edict of the Spanish Inquisition. Freemasons in high places in Spanish society were arrested, and the Masonic Lodges were suppressed. Ferdinand blamed Freemasonry for the 1820 coup, the Trienio Liberal, as well as for the loss of Spanish colonies in Latin America, with his return to the throne for the so-called "Ominous Decade", the Anti-Masonic campaign stepped up and members who would not renounce Freemasonry were hanged. He had his police compile reports on Freemasons and former Freemasons active in Spanish society.

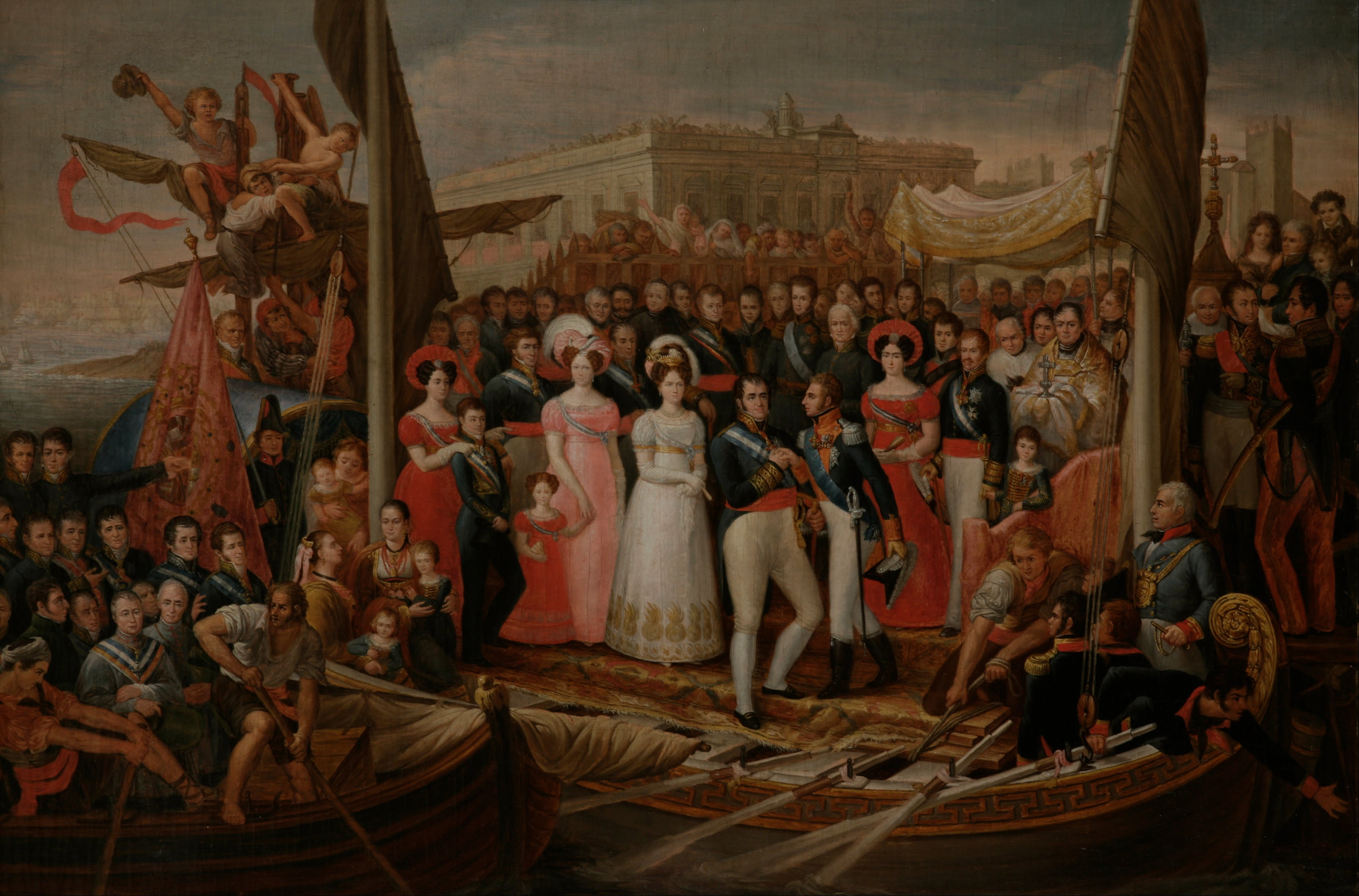
The Landing of Ferdinand VII in El Puerto de Santa María by José Aparicio

In the spring of 1823, the restored Bourbon French King Louis XVIII of France invaded Spain, "invoking the God of St. Louis, for the sake of preserving the throne of Spain to a fellow descendant of Henry IV of France, and of reconciling that fine kingdom with Europe." In May 1823, the revolutionary party moved Ferdinand to Cádiz, where he continued to make promises of constitutional amendment until he was free.

When Ferdinand was freed after the Battle of Trocadero and the fall of Cádiz, reprisals followed. The Duc d'Angoulême made known his protest against Ferdinand's reneging on his promise of amnesty for the people of Cadiz by refusing the Spanish decorations Ferdinand offered him for his military services.

During his last years, Ferdinand's political appointments became more stable. The last ten years of his reign (sometimes referred to as the Ominous Decade) saw the restoration of absolutism, the re-establishment of traditional university programs and the suppression of any opposition, both by the Liberal Party and by the reactionary revolt (known as "War of the Agraviados") which broke out in 1827 in Catalonia and other regions.

=== Death and succession crisis ===
In May 1830, Ferdinand VII published the Pragmatic Sanction, again allowing daughters to succeed to the Spanish throne as well as sons. This decree had originally been approved by the Cortes in 1789, but it had never been officially promulgated. On 10 October 1830, Ferdinand's wife gave birth to a daughter, Isabella, who thereupon displaced her uncle, Infante Carlos María Isidro of Spain, in the line of succession. After Ferdinand's death in late September 1833, Carlos revolted and said he was the legitimate king. Needing support, Maria Christina, as regent for her daughter, turned to the liberals. She issued a decree of amnesty on 23 October 1833. Liberals who had been in exile returned and dominated Spanish politics for decades, leading to the Carlist Wars.

== Legacy ==
Ferdinand VII's reign is typically criticised by historians, even in his own country. Historian Stanley G. Payne wrote that Ferdinand was "in many ways the basest king in Spanish history. Cowardly, selfish, grasping, suspicious, and vengeful, D. Fernando seemed almost incapable of any perception of the commonwealth."

== Marriages ==
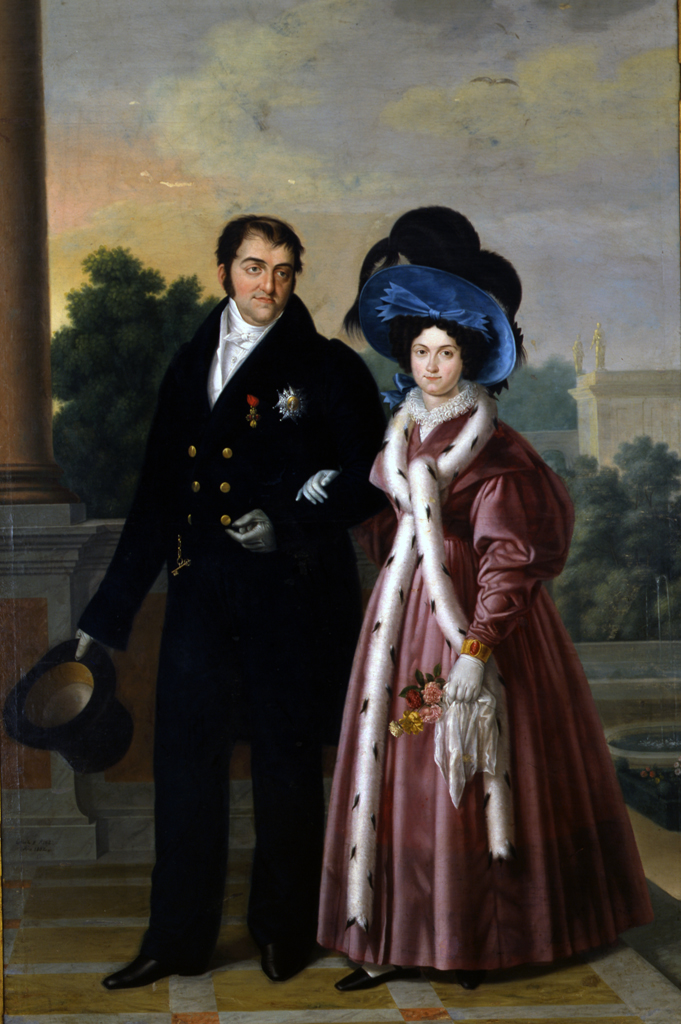
Ferdinand VII and María Cristina by Luis de la Cruz y Ríos (1832)

Ferdinand VII married four times. His first wife died of tuberculosis, the second died in childbirth, and the third died of "a fever". His fourth wife outlived him by 45 years.

In 1802, he married his first cousin Princess Maria Antonia of Naples and Sicily (1784–1806), daughter of Ferdinand I of the Two Sicilies and Marie Caroline of Austria. Her two pregnancies in 1804 and 1805 both ended in miscarriages.

In 1816, Ferdinand married his niece Maria Isabel of Portugal (1797–1818), daughter of his older sister Carlota Joaquina and John VI of Portugal. They had a daughter who lived only five months, and a stillborn daughter.

On 20 October 1819, in Madrid, Ferdinand married the daughter of his father's first cousin Maximilian, Prince of Saxony and of his mother's niece Caroline of Parma, Princess Maria Josepha Amalia of Saxony (1803–1829). They had no children.

Lastly, on 27 May 1829, Ferdinand married another niece, Maria Christina of the Two Sicilies (1806–1878), daughter of his younger sister Maria Isabella of Spain and of their first cousin Francis I of the Two Sicilies, who was also the brother of Ferdinand's first wife. They had two surviving daughters, the older of whom succeeded Ferdinand upon his death.

== Issue ==
Name	Birth	Death	Burial	Notes
By Maria Isabel of Portugal (1797–1818)
Infanta María Luisa Isabel	21 August 1817; Madrid	9 January 1818; Madrid	El Escorial	died in infancy.
Infanta María Luisa Isabel	26 December 1818; Madrid		El Escorial	Stillborn; Maria Isabel died as a result of her birth.
By Maria Christina of the Two Sicilies (1806–1878)
Infanta María Isabel Luisa	10 October 1830; Madrid	10 April 1904; Paris	El Escorial	Princess of Asturias 1830–1833, Queen of Spain 1833–1868. Married Francis, Duke of Cádiz, had issue.
Infanta María Luisa Fernanda	30 January 1832; Madrid	2 February 1897; Seville	El Escorial	Married Antoine, Duke of Montpensier, had issue.

== Honours ==
- Spain:
  - Knight of the Golden Fleece, 14 October 1784
  - Grand Cross of the Order of Charles III, 1784
  - Founder and Grand Master of the Military Order of St. Ferdinand, 31 August 1811
  - Founder and Grand Master of the Military Order of St. Hermengild, 28 November 1814
  - Founder and Grand Master of the Order of Isabella the Catholic, 24 March 1815
- Kingdom of Portugal: Grand Cross of the Sash of the Three Orders, 1796
- France:
  - French Empire: Grand Eagle of the Legion of Honour, 1806/07
  - Kingdom of France: Knight of the Holy Spirit, 1814
- Kingdom of Prussia: Knight of the Black Eagle, 3 June 1814
- United Kingdom: Knight of the Garter, 10 August 1814
- Russian Empire:
  - Knight of St. Andrew, 23 May 1815
  - Knight of St. Alexander Nevsky, 23 May 1815
- Denmark: Knight of the Elephant, 29 August 1818
- Austrian Empire: Grand Cross of St. Stephen, 1825
- Two Sicilies:
  - Knight of St. Januarius
  - Grand Cross of St. Ferdinand and Merit

== Ancestry ==
Ancestors of Ferdinand VII

8. Philip V of Spain
4. Charles III of Spain
9. Elisabeth Farnese
2. Charles IV of Spain
10. Augustus III of Poland
5. Maria Amalia of Saxony
11. Maria Josepha of Austria
1. Ferdinand VII of Spain
12. Philip V of Spain (= 8)
6. Philip, Duke of Parma
13. Elisabeth Farnese (= 9)
3. Maria Luisa of Parma
14. Louis XV of France
7. Louise Élisabeth of France
15. Marie Leszczyńska

Ferdinand VII House of Bourbon Cadet branch of the Capetian dynasty Born: 14 October 1784 Died: 29 September 1833
Regnal titles
Preceded by Charles IV	King of Spain; 1808	Succeeded by Joseph I
Preceded by Joseph	King of Spain; 1813–1833	Succeeded by Isabella II
Spanish nobility
Preceded by Charles (IV)	Prince of Asturias; 1788–1808	Vacant Title next held by Isabella (II)
