= The Landing of Ferdinand VII in El Puerto de Santa María =

Painting by José Aparicio

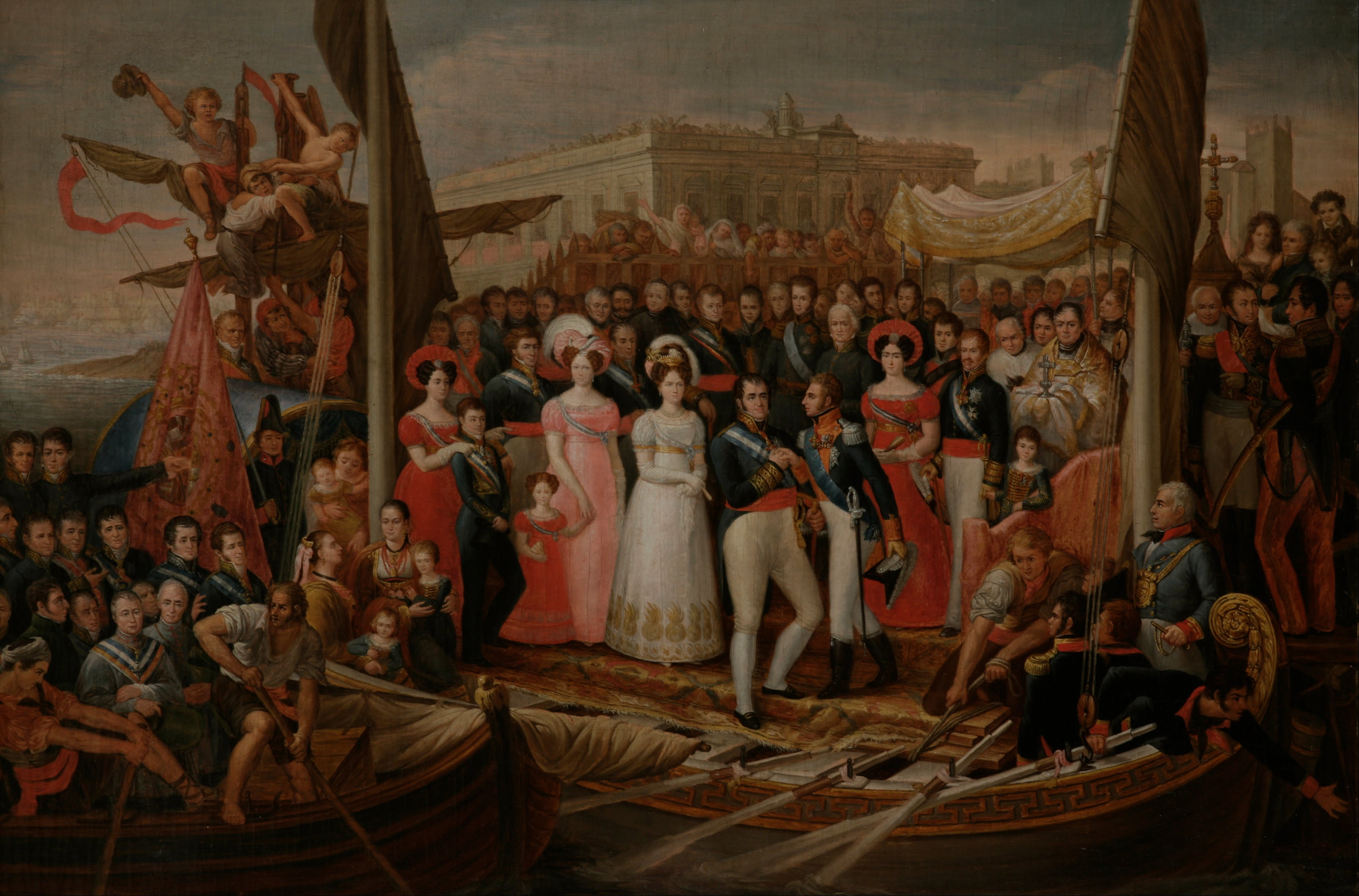
- Artist: José Aparicio
- Year: 1823–28
- Type: Oil on canvas, history painting
- Dimensions: 82 cm × 115 cm (32 in × 45 in)
- Location: Museum of Romanticism, Madrid

The Landing of Ferdinand VII in El Puerto de Santa María (Spanish: Desembarco de Fernando VII en el Puerto de Santa María) is an 1828 history painting by the Spanish artist José Aparicio. It depicts a scene on 1 October 1823 when Ferdinand VII of Spain landed at the town of El Puerto de Santa María accompanied by his family to be greeted by the Duke of Angoulême. Angoulême was the commander of the Hundred Thousand Sons of Saint Louis, a French army that had invaded Spain in order to free Ferdinand from the captivity of the Liberal Government.

Neoclassical in style, the painting features the town's custom house in the background. Amongst those depicted accompanying Ferdinand are his wife Queen Maria Josepha Amalia and various other relations including Luisa Carlotta, Francisco de Paula, Maria Teresa of Braganza and Infante Sebastian. The King's brother Infante Carlos, later founder of the Carlist movement, his wife Maria Francisca and their son Carlos Luis are directly to the right of Angoulême.

The original, larger version of the painting, was destroyed during a 1915 fire at the Convent of the Salesas Reales where the Supreme Court of Spain was based. Aparicio also produced this version due to requests for copies by municipal bodies. Today it is in the collection of the Museum of Romanticism in Madrid.

== Bibliography ==
- González, Begoña Torres. Museo del Romanticismo: la colección. Ministerio de Cultura, 2011.
- Jarrett, Mark. The Congress of Vienna and Its Legacy: War and Great Power Diplomacy After Napoleon. I.B. Tauris, 2013.
