= José Aparicio =

Spanish painter (1773–1838)

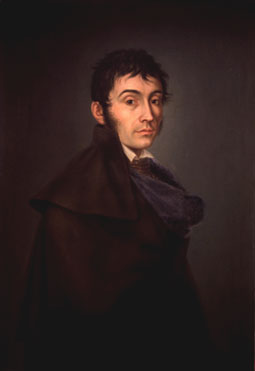
José Aparicio (1820); probably a self-portrait

José Aparicio e Inglada (16 December 1773 – 10 May 1838) was a Spanish painter in the Neoclassical style; closely associated with the reign of King Ferdinand VII.

== Biography ==
He was born in Alicante, the seventh of eight children in a middle-class family. His first artistic studies were at the Real Academia de Bellas Artes de San Carlos de Valencia, where he won first prize for painting in 1793.

After that, he attended the Real Academia de Bellas Artes de San Fernando in Madrid. In 1796, his painting of Manuel Godoy presenting Peace (the Peace of Basel) to King Carlos IV won him a grant from the King to study in Paris and Rome. In Paris, he was the first Spanish student of Jacques-Louis David. He won a gold medal for his painting The Yellow Fever in Valencia in 1805.

He went to Rome in 1807 and, on several occasions, refused to swear allegiance to the new King, Joseph I. Because of this, he and other like-minded Spaniards there were virtual prisoners at the Castel Sant'Angelo, until Ferdinand was restored to the throne in 1813.

After regaining his freedom, he was recalled to Spain and arrived there in 1815. After a few months, he settled in Madrid, having been appointed a court painter to Ferdinand. A year later, he began painting The Glories of Spain, which would occupy him for two years. This was the first of a long series of works on patriotic themes.

For his best-known work, The Landing of Ferdinand VII in El Puerto de Santa María, he was named an "Academician of Merit" at the Academia de San Carlos in 1829. Later, he became the Director of the Academia de San Fernando. In addition to historical paintings, he was noted for his portraits of the Spanish aristocracy and military officers.

Following Ferdinand's death in 1833, he fell out of favor with the new Liberal government, as he was considered to be a propagandist for the King. After a bout with pneumonia, he was forced into retirement and awarded a nominal pension, although he apparently had to fight to receive his payments on schedule. He died in poverty in Madrid, aged 64.

== Selected paintings ==
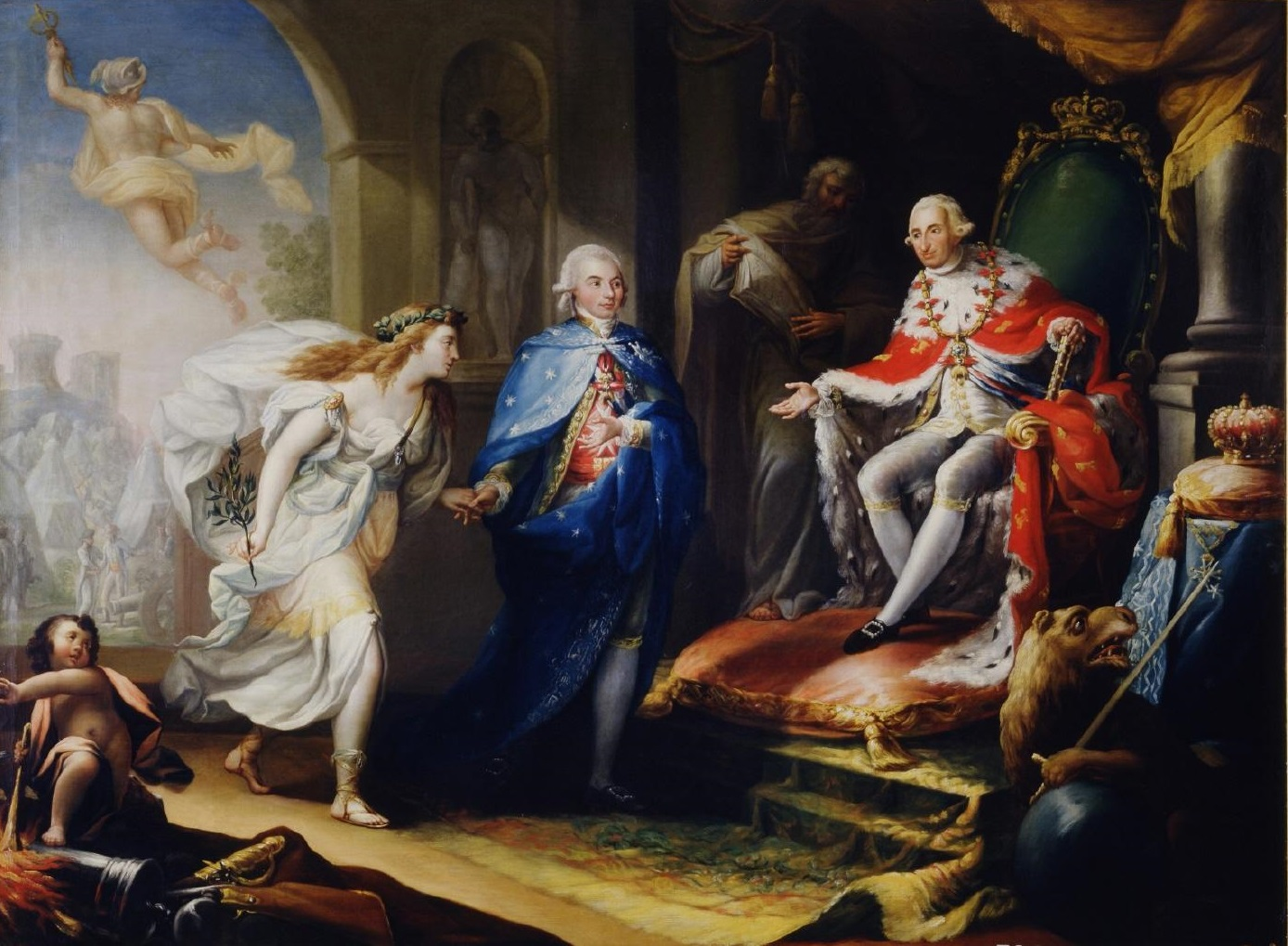
Godoy Presenting Peace
to King Carlos IV, 1796

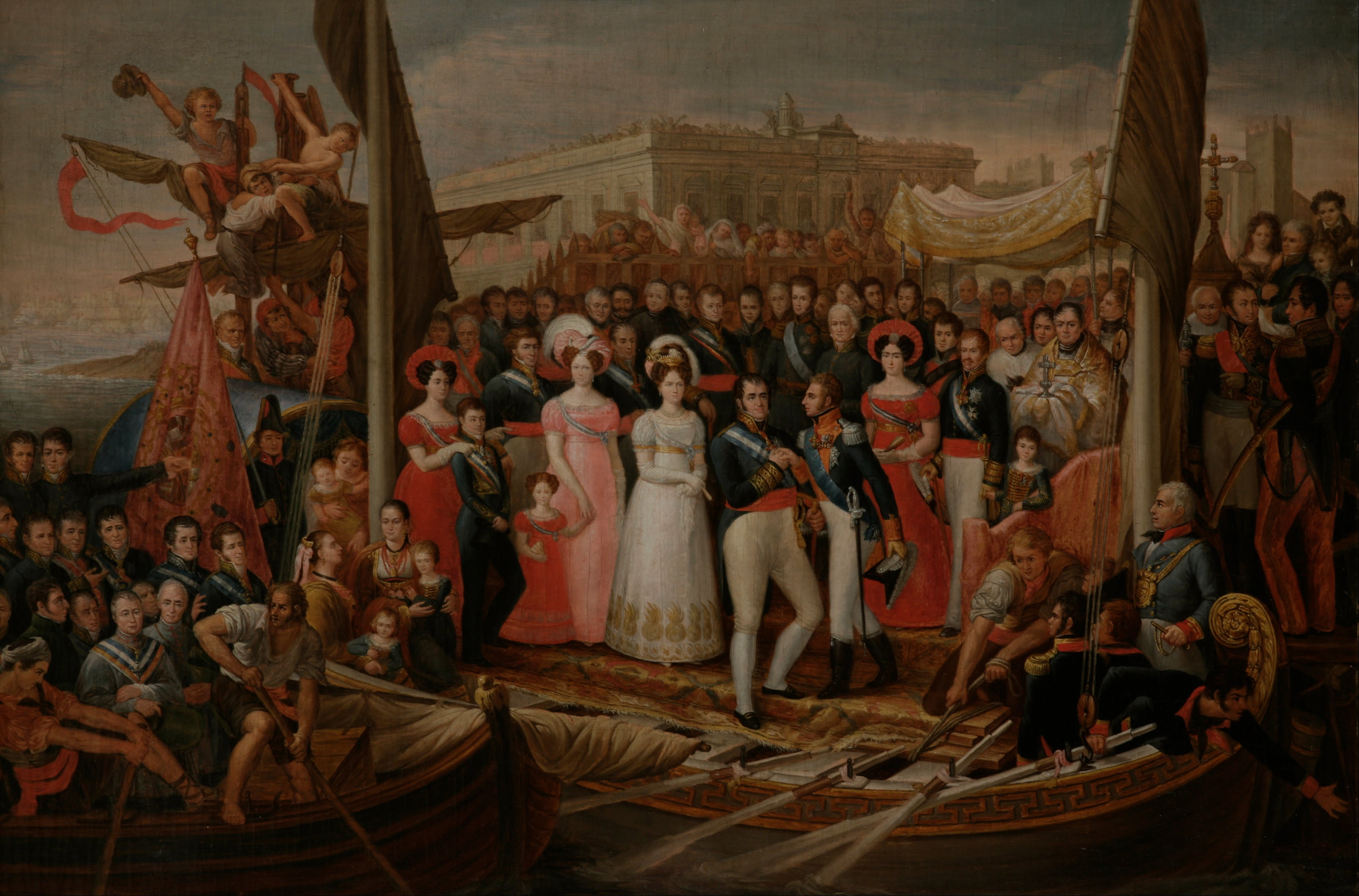
The Landing of Ferdinand VII in El Puerto de Santa María, 1828

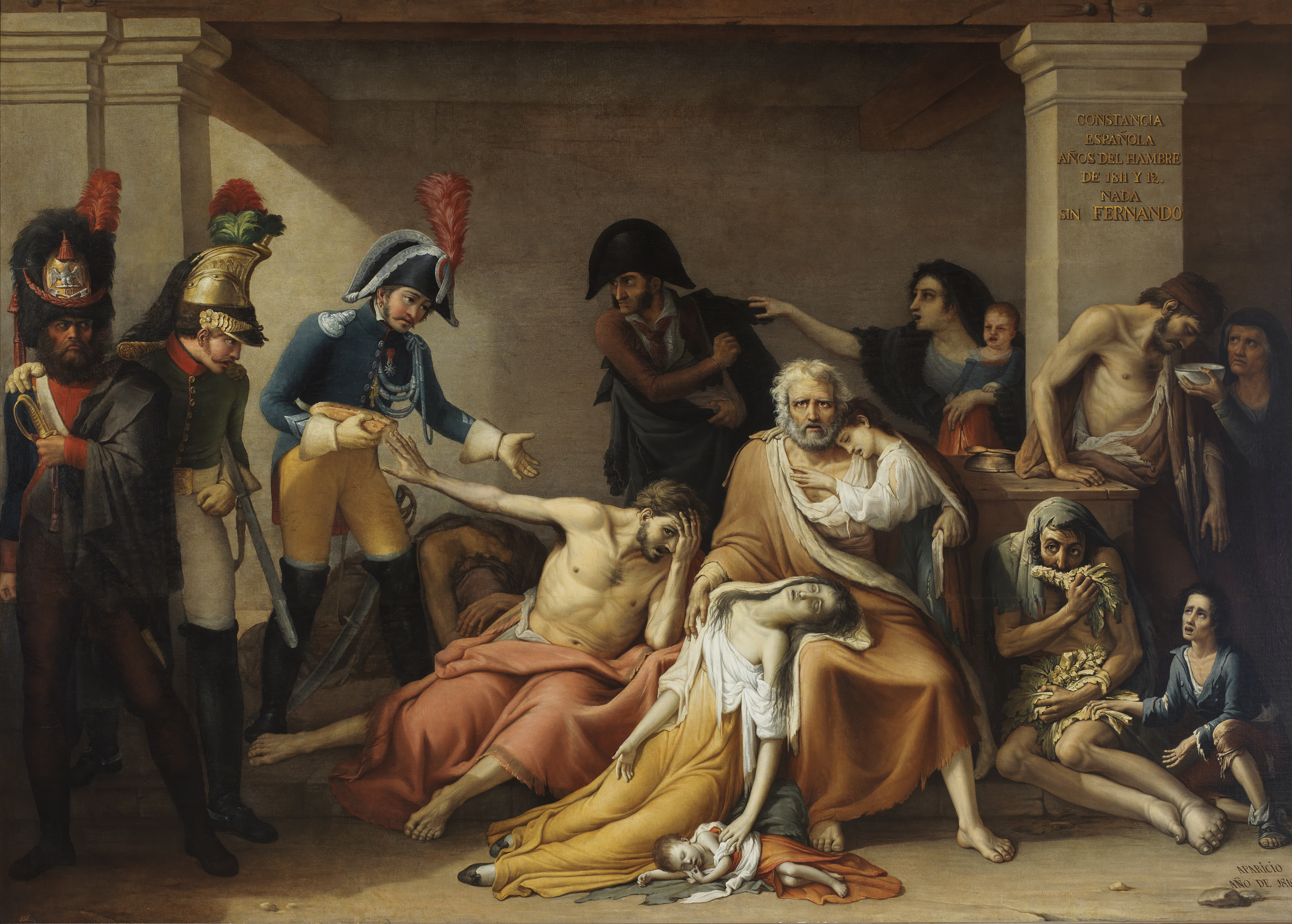
Hunger in Madrid, 1818

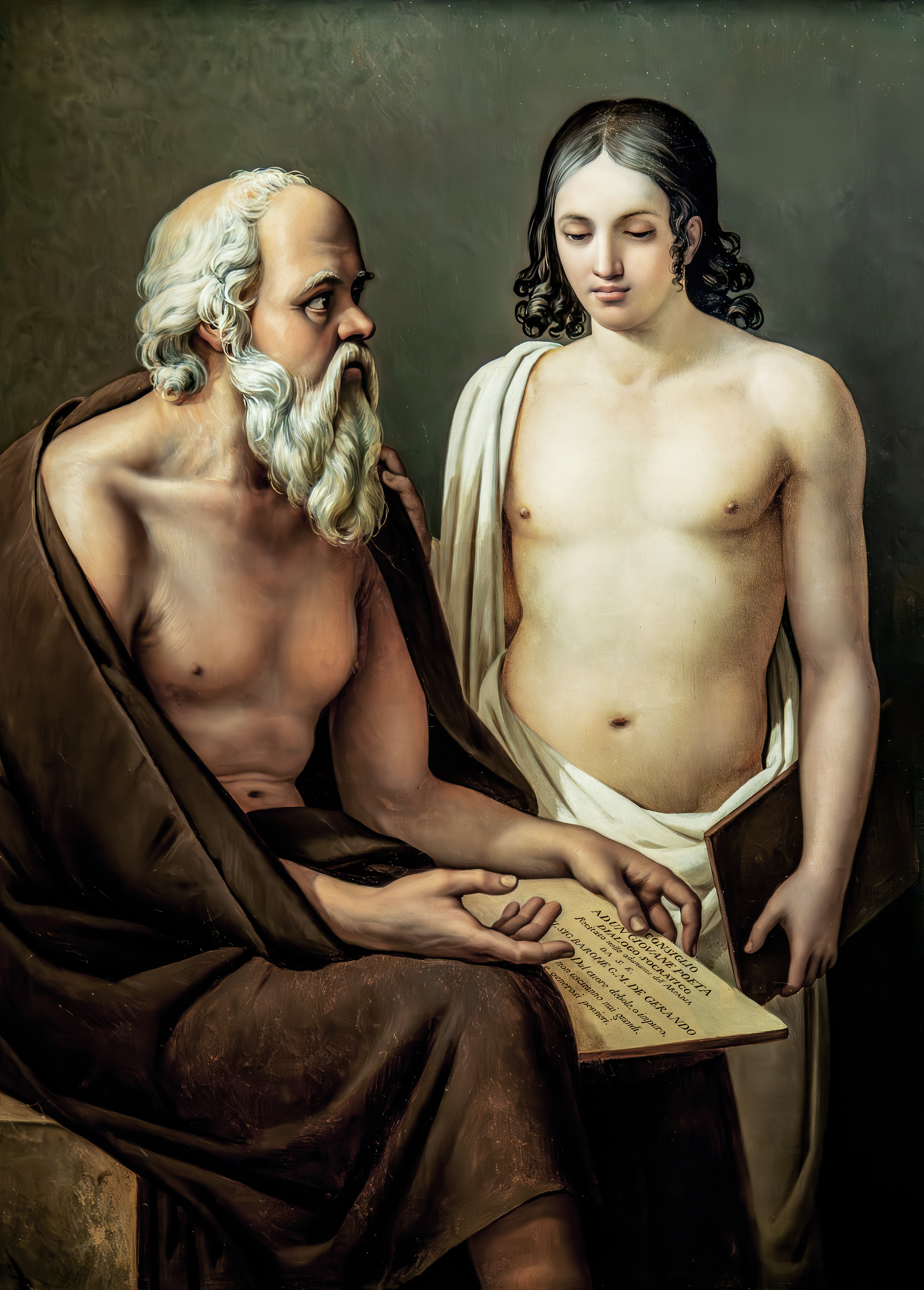
Socrates teaching a young man, 1811

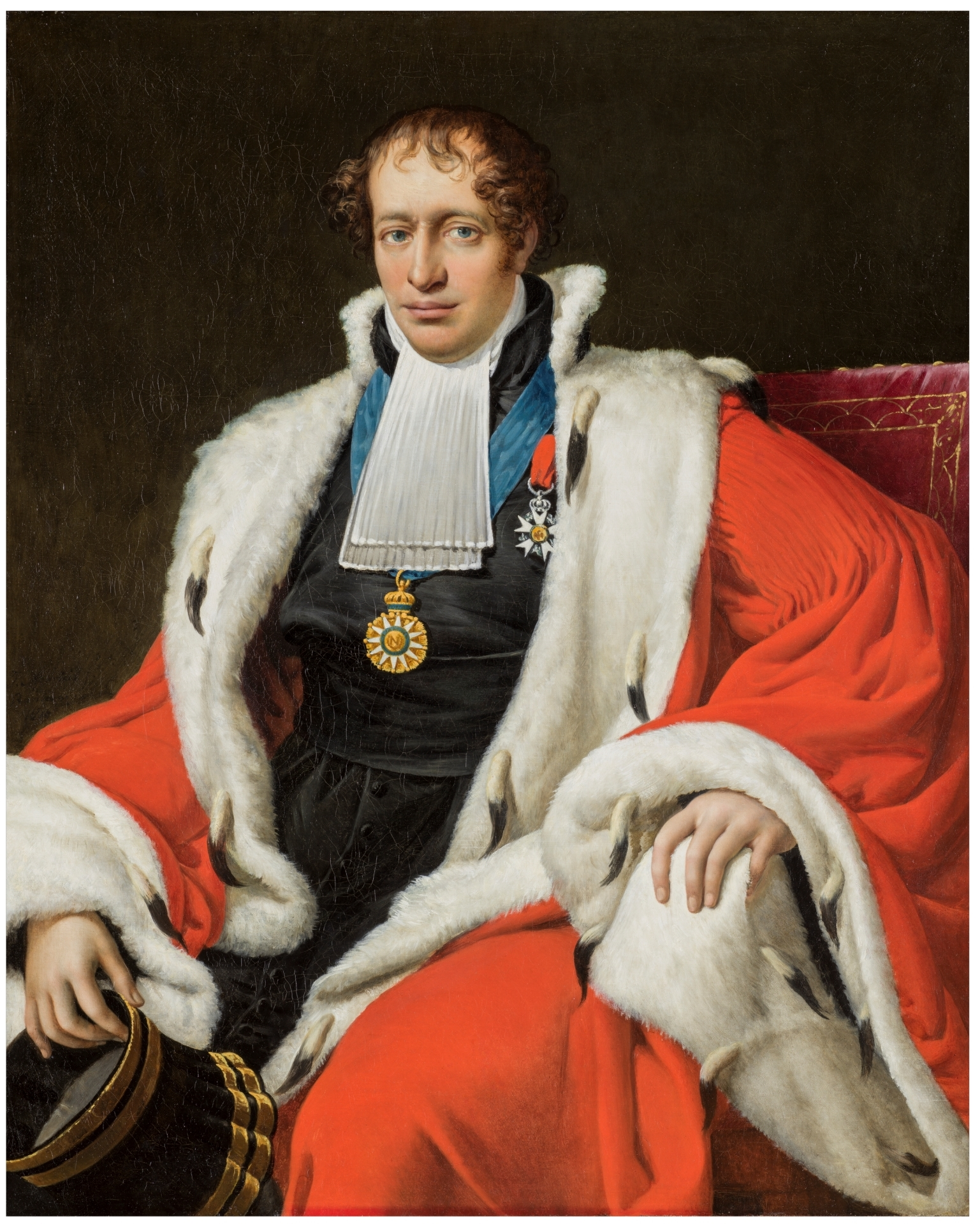
Giuseppe Maria Ferdinando Dal Pozzo, 1810
