= Descendants of Charles III of Spain =

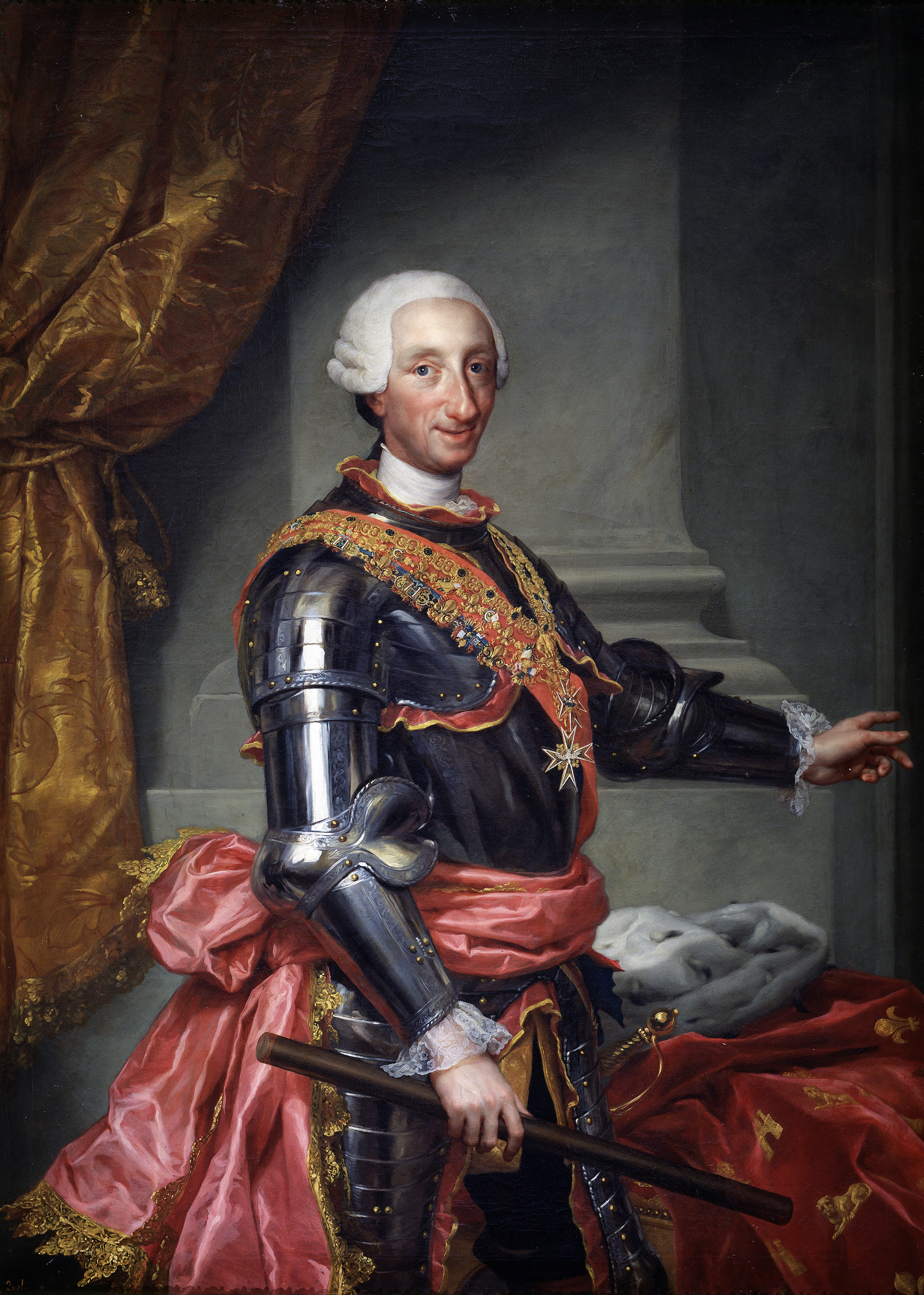
Charles as King of Spain 1761.

Charles III of Spain was the third surviving son of the first Bourbon King of Spain Philip V and Elisabeth Farnese. The descendants of Charles III of Spain, are numerous. Growing up in Madrid till he was 16, he was sent to the Italian Sovereign Duchy of Parma and Piacenza which, through his mother Elisabeth of Parma, was considered his birthright. Charles married only once, to the cultured Princess Maria Amalia of Saxony, with whom he had 13 children; 8 of these reached adulthood (most dying young of smallpox) and only 4 of these had issue.

A younger son of Charles would found the House of Bourbon-Two Sicilies, while his younger brother would found the House of Bourbon-Parma. This article deals with the children of Charles III and in turn their senior descendants.

== Background of Charles ==
The future Charles III (Real Alcázar de Madrid, Madrid, Kingdom of Spain, 20 January 1716 – Royal Palace of Madrid, Madrid, Kingdom of Spain, 14 December 1788) was the King of Spain and the Spanish Indies from 1759 to his death in 1788.

Eldest son of Philip V of Spain and his second wife, Princess Elisabeth of Parma, he became the Duke of Parma and Piacenza under the name of Charles I (at the death of his great uncle Antonio Farnese); later on in 1734 while Duke of Parma he conquered the Kingdoms of Naples and Sicily and was thus created the King of Naples and Sicily due to a personal union; he ruled under the simple name of Charles with no specific numeration even though time has made him Charles VII of Naples and Charles V and Sicily. In Sicily, he was known as Charles III of Sicily and of Jerusalem; using the ordinal one III rather than V for the Sicilian people did not recognise as their sovereign legitimate one or Charles I of Naples (Charles d'Anjou), against whom they rebelled, nor the Emperor Charles, quickly discharged of the island. He was crowned King of Naples and Sicily at Palermo, Sicily on 3 July 1735.

After becoming the King of Spain by default, he left the Neapolitan and Sicilian kingdoms to his third surviving son who was later Ferdinand IV of Naples; Ferdinand III of Sicily; Ferdinand would see the creation of the future Kingdom of the Two Sicilies which would be ruled by Charles' descendants till 1861.

He was a proponent of enlightened absolutism.

Family of Charles in 1743

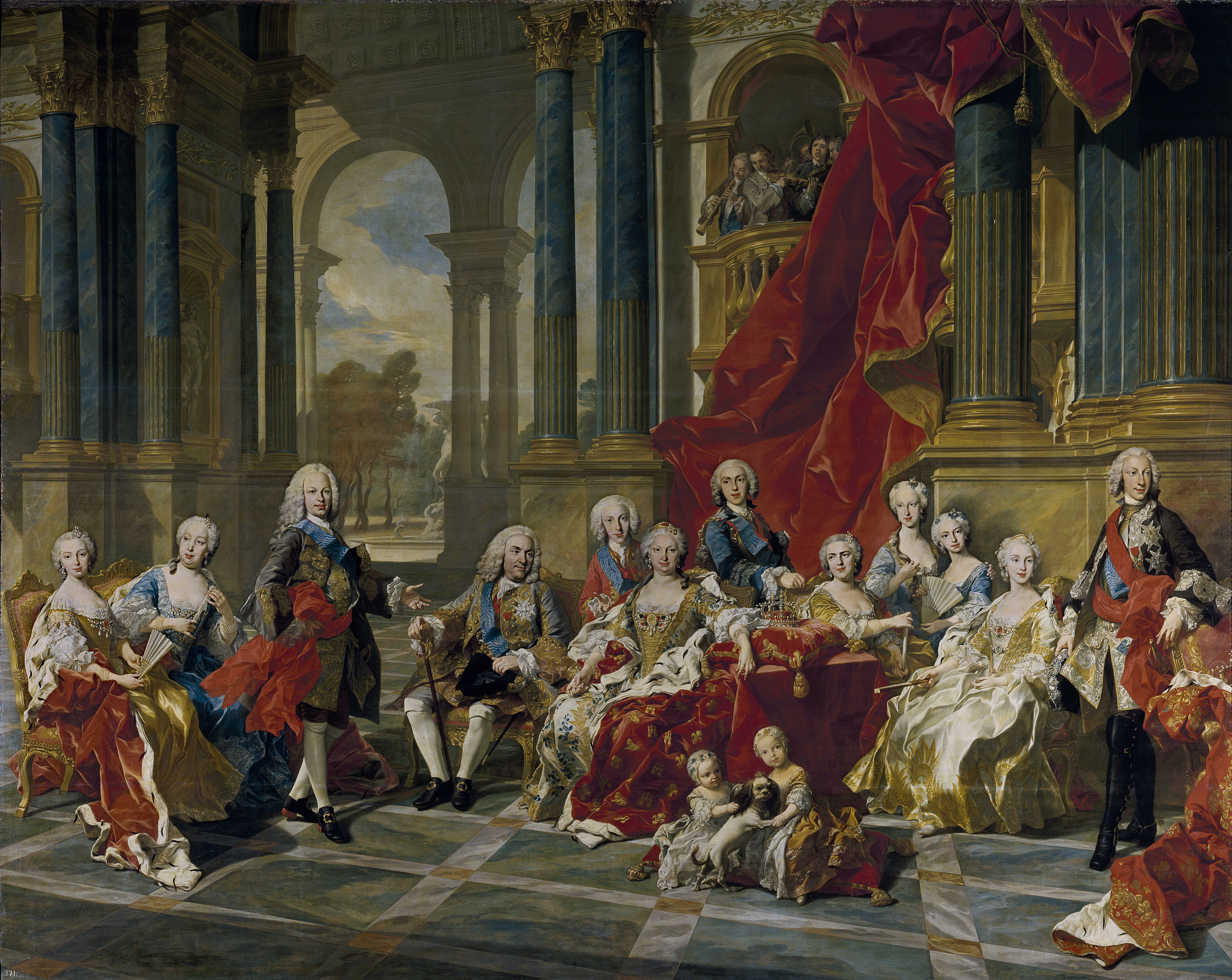
"The Family of Philip V of Spain 1743"; (L-R) Mariana Victoria, Princess of Brazil; Barbara, Princess of Asturias; Ferdinand, Prince of Asturias; King Philip V; Luis, Count of Chinchón; Elisabeth of Parma; Infante Philip; Princess Marie Louise Élisabeth of France; Infanta Maria Teresa Rafaela; Infanta Maria Antonietta; Maria Amalia, Queen of Naples and Sicily; Charles, King of Naples and Sicily. The two children in the foreground are Princess Maria Isabel Ana of Naples and Sicily and Infanta Isabella Maria of Spain (daughter of the future Duke of Parma)

=== Maria Amalia of Saxony ===
She was born at the Zwinger Palace in Dresden, the daughter of Augustus III of Poland, Elector of Saxony and Maria Josepha, herself daughter of Joseph I, Holy Roman Emperor. Her full name was Maria Amalia Christina Franziska Xaveria Flora Walburga von Sachsen. One of 15 children, she was the sister of Frederick Christian, Elector of Saxony,

In 1737 Maria Amalia became engaged to the future Charles III of Spain. The marriage date was confirmed on 31 October 1737. In 1738, at the age of 14, Maria Amalia married Charles of Bourbon, then King of Naples and Sicily. Despite the fact that this was an arranged marriage, the couple was very close and had many children. Maria Amalia had a proxy ceremony at Dresden in May 1738 with her brother.

The couple met for the first time on 19 June 1738 at Portella.

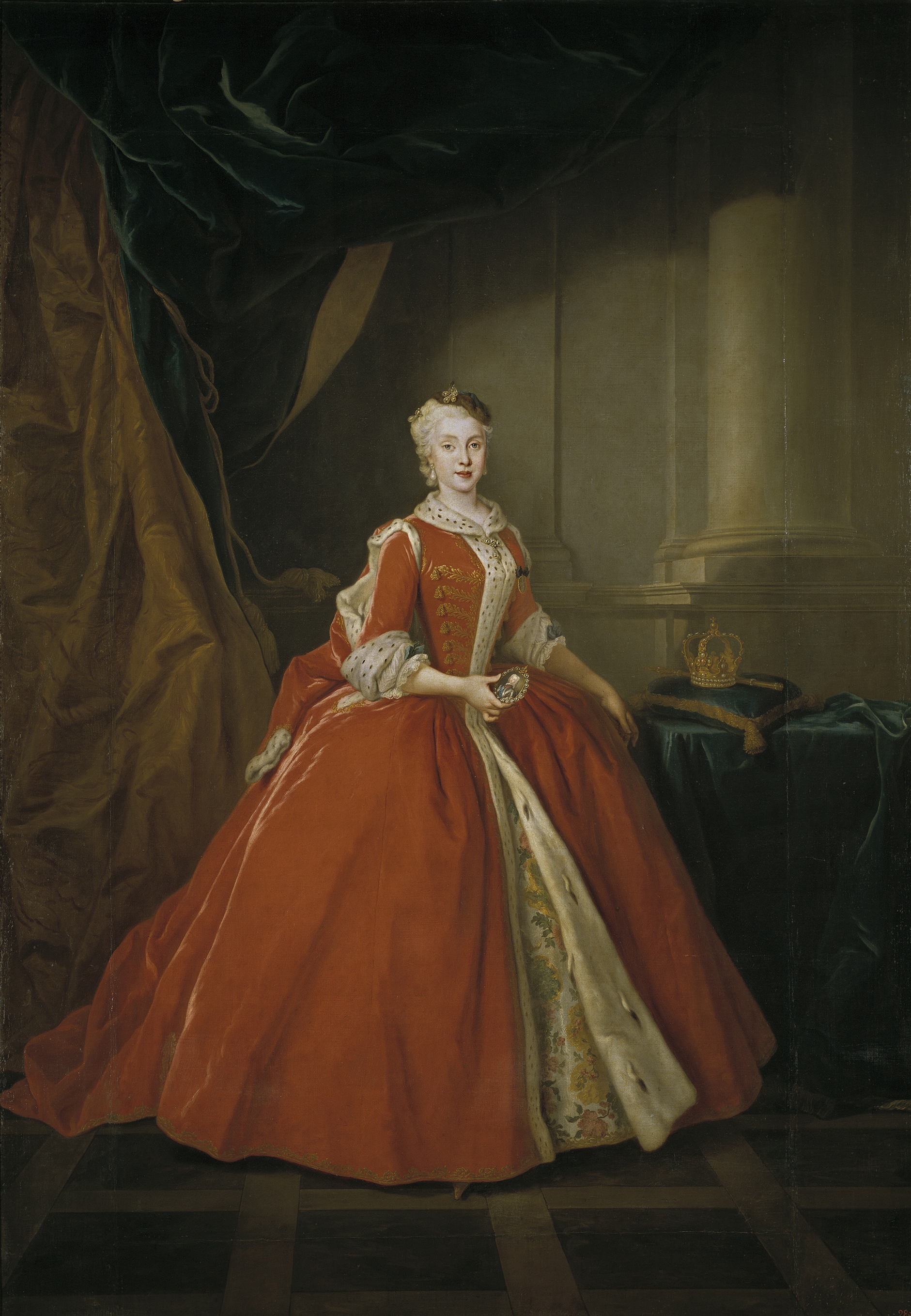
Charles' devoted wife Maria Amalia of Saxony.

At the end of 1758, Charles' half brother Ferdinand VI was displaying the same symptoms of depression that their father used to suffer from. Ferdinand lost his devoted wife, Infanta Barbara of Portugal in August 1758 and would fall into deep mourning for her. He named Charles his heir on 10 December 1758 before leaving Madrid to stay at Villaviciosa de Odón where he died on 10 August 1759. In September 1760, a year after arriving in Madrid, Maria Amalia died from tuberculosis at the Buen Retiro Palace outside the capital. She was buried at the Royal Crypt in El Escorial. She was joined by her devoted husband in 1788.

== Issue ==
=== Princess Maria Isabel ===
Maria Isabel Antonietta de Padua Francisca Januaria Francisca de Paula Juana Nepomucena Josefina Onesifora of Naples and Sicily was born at the Palace of Portici, Portici, Modern Italy, 6 September 1740, she died in Naples on 2 November 1742. Due to being a male line descendant of Philip V of Spain (paternal grandfather) she was an Infanta of Spain.

=== Princess Maria Josefa ===
Born Princess Maria Josefa Antonietta of Naples and Sicily at the Palace of Portici on 20 January 1742 she later died in Naples on 1 April 1742. She was an Infanta of Spain.

=== Princess Maria Isabel Ana ===
Princess Maria Isabel Ana was born at the Palace of Capodimonte on 30 April 1743; the young princess died at Capodimonte on 5 March 1749 at age 5 years, 10 months. She was an Infanta of Spain.

=== Princess Maria Josefa ===
Princess Maria Josefa Carmela was born at Gaeta in Italy on 6 July 1744; the first of the Charles' children to live past their fifth birthday, she died in Madrid on 8 December 1801; despite her long life little is known of her. She was an Infanta of Spain.

=== Princess Maria Luisa ===
Born at the Palace of Portici on 24 November 1745, she would die at the Imperial Palace of the Hofburg in Vienna, 15 May 1792 aged 46. She would marry Leopold II, Holy Roman Emperor and become the future Holy Roman Empress; Queen consort of the Romans, Hungary and Bohemia; Archduchess consort of Austria; Grand Duchess consort of Tuscany. Despite being born as Princess Maria Luisa of Naples and Sicily, her "style" changed to Infanta Maria Luisa of Spain after 1759 when her father became King of Spain. She was buried in the Imperial Crypt in Vienna.

Descendant	Portrait	Birth	Marriages	Death
Maria Luisa of Spain; 1745–1792		24 November 1745; Naples daughter of Charles III of Spain and Maria Amalia of Saxony	Leopold II, Holy Roman Emperor; 16 February 1764; 15 children	15 May 1792; Vienna aged 46
Francis II, Holy Roman Emperor; 1792–1835		12 February 1768; Florence son of Leopold II, Holy Roman Emperor and Infante Maria Luisa of Spain	Duchess Elisabeth of Württemberg; 6 January 1788 one child Maria Theresa of Naples and Sicily; 15 September 1790; 12 children Maria Ludovika of Austria-Este; 6 January 1808 no children Caroline Augusta of Bavaria; 29 October 1816 no children	2 March 1835; Vienna aged 67
Ferdinand I of Austria; 1835–1848		19 April 1793; Florence son of Francis II, Holy Roman Emperor and Maria Theresa of Naples and Sicily	Maria Anna of Savoy; 27 February 1831 no children	29 June 1875; Prague aged 82
Archduke Franz Karl of Austria; 1848–1878		17 December 1802; Vienna son of Francis II and Maria Theresa of Naples and Sicily	Princess Sophie of Bavaria; 4 November 1824; Vienna	8 March 1878; Vienna aged 75
Franz Joseph I of Austria; 1878–1916		18 August 1830, Schönbrunn Palace son of Archduke Franz Karl of Austria and Princess Sophie of Bavaria	Elisabeth of Bavaria; 24 April 1854; 4 children	21 November 1916; Schönbrunn Palace aged 86
Maximilian, Duke of Hohenberg; 1916–1962		29 September 1902 son of Archduke Franz Ferdinand of Austria, son of Archduke Karl Ludwig of Austria, son of Archduke Franz Karl of Austria	Countess Maria Elisabeth Bona von Waldburg zu Wolfegg und Waldsee; 16 November 1926; 6 children	8 January 1962 aged 59
Franz, Duke of Hohenberg; 1962–1977		13 September 1927; Artstetten Castle, Austria son of Maximilian, Duke of Hohenberg and Countess Maria of Waldburg at Wolfegg and Waldsee	Princess Elisabeth of Luxembourg; 9 May 1956; 2 children	16 August 1977 aged 49
Princess Anna (Anita) of Hohenberg; 1977–		18 August 1958; Schloss Berg, Luxembourg daughter of Franz, Duke of Hohenberg and Princess Elisabeth of Luxembourg	Romée de la Poëze, Count of Harambure; 15 July 1978; 4 children Count Andreas von Bardeau; 9 July 2005 no children	

=== Prince Felipe ===
Prince Felipe Antonio Genaro Pasquale Francesco de Paula of Naples and Sicily was born the first son at the Palace of Portici, 13 June 1747; titled the Duke of Calabria, he was excluded from succession to the throne due to his mental conditions; he died at the Palace of Portici, 19 September 1777 and was buried in Naples. He was an Infante of Spain.

=== Charles IV of Spain ===
Prince Carlos Antonio Pascual Francisco Javier Juan Nepomuceno Jose Januario Serafin Diego of Naples and Sicily

Descendant	Portrait	Birth	Marriages	Death
Charles IV of Spain; 1788–1819		11 November 1748; Palace of Portici son of Charles III of Spain and Maria Amalia of Saxony	Maria Luisa of Parma; 1765; 14 children	19 January 1819; Palazzo Barberini, Rome aged 70
Ferdinand VII of Spain; 1819–1833		14 October 1784; El Escorial son of Charles IV of Spain and Maria Luisa of Parma	Maria Antonia of the Two Sicilies; 4 October 1802; Barcelona; No children Maria Isabel of Portugal; 1816; 1 child Maria Josepha of Saxony; 20 October 1819; No children Maria Christina of the Two Sicilies; 11 December 1829; Madrid; 2 children	29 September 1833; Madrid aged 48
Isabella II of Spain; 1833–1904		10 October 1830; Madrid daughter of Ferdinand VII of Spain and Maria Christina of the Two Sicilies	Francis of Spain; 10 October 1846; 12 children	10 April 1904; Paris aged 73
Alfonso XII of Spain; 1874–1885		28 November 1857; Madrid son of Isabella II of Spain and Francis, Duke of Cádiz	Mercedes of Orléans; 23 January 1878; No children Maria Christina of Austria; 29 November 1879; 3 children	25 November 1885; El Pardo aged 27
Alfonso XIII of Spain; 1904–1941		17 May 1886; Madrid son of Alfonso XII of Spain and Maria Christina of Austria	Victoria Eugenie of Battenberg; 31 May 1906; 7 children	28 February 1941; Rome aged 54
Infante Jaime, Duke of Segovia; 1941–1975		23 June 1908; Segovia son of Alfonso XIII of Spain and Victoria Eugenie of Battenberg	Emmanuelle de Dampierre; 4 March 1935; Rome; 2 children	20 March 1975; St. Gallen aged 67
Alfonso, Duke of Anjou and Cádiz; 1975–1989		20 April 1936; Rome son of Infante Jaime, Duke of Segovia and Emmanuelle de Dampierre	María del Carmen Martínez-Bordiú y Franco; 8 March 1972; Royal Palace of El Pardo; 2 children	30 January 1989; Beaver Creek aged 53
Louis Alphonse, Duke of Anjou; 1989–present		25 April 1974; Madrid son of Alfonso, Duke of Anjou and Cádiz and María del Carmen Martínez-Bordiú y Franco	Maria Margarita, Duchess of Anjou; 5 November 2004; Caracas; 3 children	

=== Princess Maria Teresa ===
Maria Teresa Antonieta Francisca Javier Francisca de Paula Serafina was born at the Royal Palace of Naples, 2 December 1749; the young princess died at the Palace of Portici on 2 May 1750. She was an Infanta of Spain.

=== Ferdinand I of the Two Sicilies ===
Name	Portrait	Birth	Marriage(s)	Death
Ferdinand I 1816–1825	Ferdinand I	12 January 1751; Naples son of Charles VII and Maria Amalia of Saxony	Marie Caroline of Austria; 12 May 1768; 17 children Lucia Migliaccio of Floridia; 27 November 1814; No children	4 January 1825; Naples aged 73
Francis I 1825–1830	Francis I	14 August 1777; Naples son of Ferdinand I and Maria Carolina of Austria	Maria Isabella of Spain; 6 July 1802; 12 children	8 November 1830; Naples aged 53
Ferdinand II; 1830–1859	Ferdinand II	12 January 1810; Palermo son of Francis I and Maria Isabella of Spain	Maria Christina of Savoy; 21 November 1832; 1 child Maria Theresa of Austria; 9 January 1837; 12 children	22 May 1859; Caserta aged 49
Francis II; 1859–1861	Francis II	16 January 1836; Naples son of Ferdinand II and Maria Christina of Savoy	Maria Sophie of Bavaria; 8 January 1859; 1 child	27 December 1894; Arco aged 58
Prince Alfonso, Count of Caserta; 1894–1934	Prince Alfonso, Count of Caserta	28 March 1841; Caserta son of Ferdinand II of the Two Sicilies and Maria Theresa of Austria	Princess Antonietta of Bourbon-Two Sicilies; 8 June 1868; 12 children	26 May 1934; Cannes aged 93
Prince Ferdinand Pius, Duke of Calabria; 1934–1960		25 July 1869; Rome son of Prince Alfonso, Count of Caserta and Princess Maria Antonietta of Bourbon-Two Sicilies	Princess Maria Ludwiga Theresia of Bavaria; 31 May 1897; 6 children	7 January 1960; Lindau aged 90
Princess Maria Cristina of Bourbon-Two Sicilies; 1960–1985		4 May 1899; Madrid daughter of Prince Ferdinand Pius, Duke of Calabria and Princess Maria Ludwiga Theresia of Bavaria	Manuel Sotomayor Luna; 3 March 1948 no children	21 April 1985; Quito, Ecuador aged 85
Princess Lucia of Bourbon-Two Sicilies; 1985–2001		9 July 1908; Nymphenburg Palace, Munich, Bavaria daughter of Prince Ferdinand Pius, Duke of Calabria and Princess Maria Ludwiga Theresia of Bavaria	Eugenio, 5th Duke of Genoa; 29 October 1938; 1 child	3 November 2001; São Paulo, Brazil aged 93
Princess Maria Isabella of Savoy-Genoa; 2001–		23 June 1943; Rome daughter of Princess Lucia of Bourbon-Two Sicilies and Eugenio, 5th Duke of Genoa	Alberto Frioli; 7 April 1943; 4 children	

=== Prince Gabriel ===
Prince Gabriel Antonio Francisco Javier Juan Nepomuceno José Serafin Pascual Salvador of Naples and Sicily was born at the Palace of Portici, 11 May 1752; married Infanta Mariana Vitória of Portugal, daughter of Maria I of Portugal; had three children two of which died young; died at his private residence, the Casita del Infante, San Lorenzo de El Escorial, Spain, 23 November 1788.

Descendant	Portrait	Birth	Marriages	Death
Infante Gabriel of Spain; 1752–1788		12 May 1752; Palace of Portici son of Charles III of Spain and Maria Amalia of Saxony	Infanta Mariana Victoria of Portugal; 1785; 3 children	23 November 1788; Casita del Infante, El Escorial, Spain aged 36
Infante Peter Charles of Spain and Portugal; 1788–1812		18 June 1786; Aranjuez, Spain son of Infante Gabriel of Spain and Infanta Mariana Victoria of Portugal	Teresa, Princess of Beira; 1810; 1 child	4 July 1812; Rio de Janeiro, Brazil aged 26
Infante Sebastian of Portugal and Spain; 1812–1875		4 November 1811; Rio de Janeiro, Brazil son of Infante Peter Charles of Spain and Portugal and Teresa, Princess of Beira	Princess Maria Amalia of Bourbon-Two Sicilies; 1832 no children Maria Cristina of Spain; 1860; 5 children	13 February 1875; Pau, France aged 63
Francisco de Borbón y de Borbón, Duke of Marchena; 1875–1923		1861; Madrid, Spain son of Infante Sebastian of Portugal and Spain and Maria Cristina of Spain	Maria del Pilar de Muguiro y Beruete, Duchess of Villa-Franca; 1886; 3 children	1923 aged 62
Cristina de Borbón y de Muguiro, Duchess of Marchena; 1923–1981		1889; Paris, France daughter of Francisco de Borbón y de Borbón, Duke of Marchena and Maria del Pilar de Muguiro y Beruete, Duchess of Villa-Franca	Leopold Walford; 1911; 4 children	1981; London, England aged 62
Juan Jorge Walford y de Borbón, Duke of Ansola and Marchena; 1981–		1912; Paris, France son of Cristina de Borbón y de Muguiro, Duchess of Marchena and Leopold Walford	Emanuela Hawkins; 1935; 7 children	

=== Princess Maria Ana ===
Born at the Palace of Portici, 3 July 1754; she died at the Palace of Capodimonte, 11 May 1755. She was an Infanta of Spain.

=== Prince Antonio Pascual ===
Prince Antonio Pascual Francisco Javier Juan Nepomuceno Aniello Raimundo Sylvestre of Naples and Sicily was born at the Caserta Palace, 31 December 1755; he married his niece, Infanta Maria Amalia of Spain (1779–1798) in 1795 and had no issue. He died in Madrid on 20 April 1817. He is more commonly known as Infante Antonio Pascual. He was buried at El Escorial.

=== Prince Francis ===
Prince Francisco Javier Antonio Pascual Bernardo Francisco de Paula Juan Nepomuceno Aniello Julian of Naples and Sicily was born at the Caserta Palace on 15 February 1757 little is known of the youngest of Charles' children but he did move to Spain with his parents in 1759; he died unmarried and without known issue at the Royal Palace of Aranjuez, Spain on 10 April 1771. He was buried at El Escorial.

== See also ==
- Descendants of Henry IV of France
- Descendants of Louis XIV
- Descendants of Philip V of Spain
- Bourbon Claim to the Spanish Throne
