= House of Bourbon-Braganza =

Iberian noble house

House of Bourbon-Braganza Casa de Bourbon-Bragança Casa de Borbón-Braganza
- Parent house: Capetian dynasty (through the House of Bourbon-Spain and the House of Braganza)
- Country: Portugal, Spain
- Founded: 1785; 241 years ago
- Founder: Infante Gabriel of Spain and Infanta Mariana Victoria of Portugal
- Titles: Infante of Portugal; Infante of Spain; Duke of Marchena; Duke of Durcal; Duke of Hernani; Duke of Ansola
- Estates: of Portugal and Spain
- Dissolution: 1979; 47 years ago (male); 2008; 18 years ago (female)

The House of Bourbon-Braganza (Spanish: Casa de Borbón-Braganza; Portuguese: Casa de Bourbon-Bragança) was an Iberian noble house that had its origins in a royal marriage arranged in 1785 between Gabriel of Bourbon, Infante of Spain and Mariana Victoria of Braganza, Infanta of Portugal. Their descendants served as Dukes of Marchena, Dúrcal, Hernani, and Ansola.

== History ==
Their surviving son, Infante Pedro Carlos of Spain and Portugal (1786–1812), was brought up in the Portuguese court, first in Lisbon and, after 1807, in Rio de Janeiro. Until 1793, he was the only grandson of Queen Maria I, and therefore considered as a potential heir of the Portuguese throne. Similar to his father, he also married a Portuguese Infanta, his first cousin once removed Infanta Maria Teresa of Portugal (1793–1874).

They had one child Infante Sebastian of Portugal and Spain (1811–1875), Infante of Portugal by royal edict (issued in 1812), but only became a Spanish Infante in 1824 by royal edict of King Ferdinand VII of Spain, as he was only a distant descendant of King Charles III. When the Portuguese royal family returned to Europe, Sebastian went to live in Spain (1822); but, due to his support to the Carlist pretender, he returned to Portugal (1865), where King Luís I gave him a warm reception.

The legitimate male line of the family has become extinct after the death of Manfredo, 1st Duke of Hernani, in 1979; the last member of the family was Leticía Fernanda de Borbón y Bosch-Labrús, who died in 2008. Nevertheless, there are still distant female-line descendants, represented among the Spanish nobility (Dukes of Marchena, Durcal, and Ansola).

== Genealogical Chart ==
- Infante Gabriel of Spain (1752–1788) ⚭ Infanta Mariana Vitória of Portugal (1768–1788)
  - Infante Pedro Carlos of Spain and Portugal (1786–1812) ⚭ Infanta Maria Teresa of Portugal (1793–1874)
    - Infante Sebastian of Portugal and Spain (1811–1875) ⚭ Infanta María Cristina of Spain (1833–1902)
      - Francisco María de Borbón y Borbón, 1st Duke of Marchena (1861–1923)
        - María Cristina de Borbón y Muguiro, 2nd Duchess of Marchena (1889–1981)
        - Elena de Borbón y Muguiro (1890–1909)
        - María de los Ángeles de Borbón y Muguiro (1895–1964)
      - Pedro de Alcántara de Borbón y Borbón, 1st Duke of Dúrcal (1862–1892)
        - María Cristina de Borbón y Madán (1886–1985)
        - María Pía de Borbón y Madán (1888–1969)
        - Fernando Sebastián de Borbón y Madán, 2nd Duke of Dúrcal (1891–1944)
          - María Cristina de Borbón y Bosch-Labrús, 3rd Duchess of Dúrcal (1913–2002)
          - Leticía Fernanda de Borbón y Bosch-Labrús (1915–2008)
      - Luis de Jesús de Borbón y Borbón, 1st Duke of Ansola (1864–1889)
        - Luis Alfonso de Borbón y Bernaldo de Quirós, 2nd Duke of Ansola (1887–1942)
        - Manfredo Luis de Borbón y Bernaldo de Quirós, 3rd Duke of Ansola and 1st Duke of Hernani (1889–1979)
      - Alfonso María de Borbón y Borbón (1866–1934)
      - Gabriel Jesús de Borbón y Borbón (1869–1889)

== See also ==
- House of Bourbon

== Bibliography ==
- (in Spanish) Ricardo Mateos Sáinz de Medrano, Los desconocidos infantes de España, Thassalia, 1996 ISBN 9788482370545.
