= Infante Sebastião of Spain and Portugal =

Iberian prince and army leader (1811–1875)

Infante Sebastião
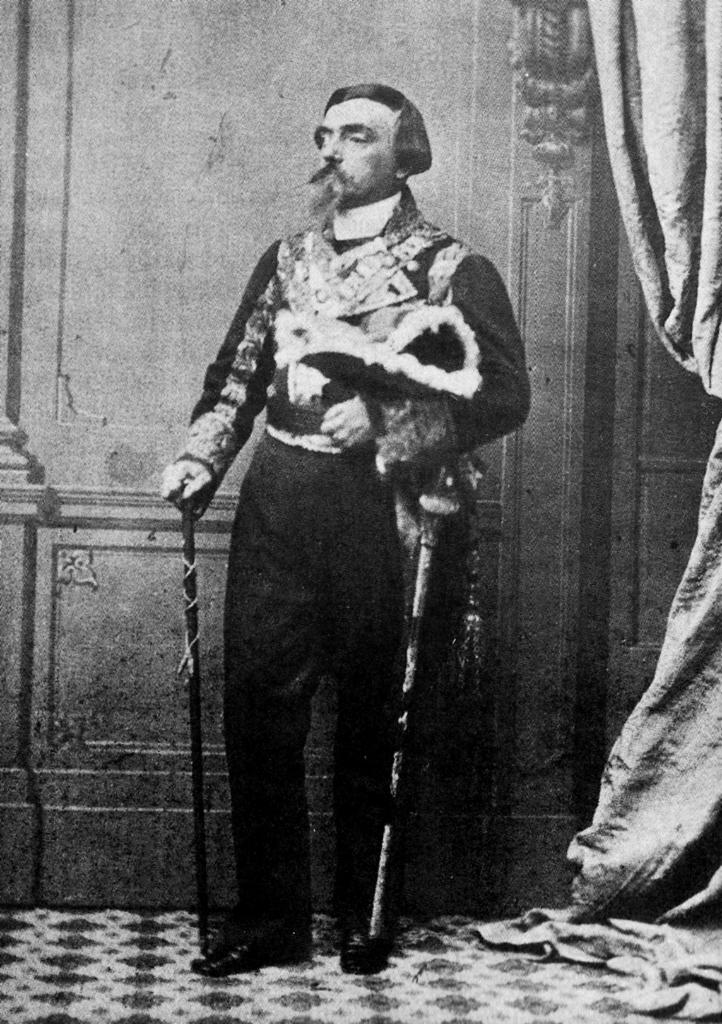
- Born: 4 November 1811; Quinta da Boa Vista, Rio de Janeiro, Brazil
- Died: 14 February 1875 (aged 63); Pau, France
- Spouse: Princess Maria Amalia of the Two Sicilies (m. 1842; died 1857) Infanta María Cristina of Spain (m. 1860)
- Issue: Francisco María, Duke of Marchena; Pedro de Alcántara de Borbón y Borbón, 1st Duke of Dúrcal; Luis de Jesús de Borbón y Borbón, 1st Duke of Ansola; Alfonso de Borbón y Borbón; Gabriel Jesús de Borbón y Borbón
Names
- Sebastián Gabriel María Carlos Juan José Francisco Javier de Paula Miguel Bartolomé de San Geminiano Rafael Gonzaga
- House: Bourbon-Braganza
- Father: Infante Pedro Carlos of Spain and Portugal
- Mother: Infanta Maria Teresa of Portugal

Dom Sebastião Gabriel of Bourbon and Braganza, (Rio de Janeiro, 4 November 1811 – Pau, 14 February 1875) Infante of Portugal and Spain, was an Iberian prince of the 19th century, progenitor of the Spanish ducal lines of Hernani, Ansola, Dúrcal and Marchena, and Carlist army commander in the First Carlist War.

== Early life ==
He was born in Rio de Janeiro in 1811 as the only child of Infanta Maria Teresa of Portugal and Infante Pedro Carlos of Spain and Portugal. His mother was the eldest daughter of King John VI of Portugal (and also a granddaughter of King Charles IV of Spain); and his father, who died shortly after Sebastian was born, was a male-line grandson of King Charles III of Spain, as well as a female-line grandson of the Queen regnant Maria I of Portugal and Brazil.

Sebastião was soon granted the title of Infante of Portugal by alvará of 9 December 1811. As he was only a great-grandson in the male line of a Spanish monarch, he was not a Spanish infante from birth, however in 1824 he was granted the style Infante of Spain by his maternal granduncle, King Ferdinand VII.

== Civil War ==
In Portugal, the country was in effective civil war since 1826, when "usurper-king" Miguel I of Portugal and his elder brother Pedro IV of Portugal (both were Sebastião's uncles) battled, until 1834.

Sebastião's mother remarried two decades later, in 1838, her uncle, Don Carlos María Isidro, the first Carlist pretender to the throne of Spain. Teresa had been a Carlist supporter since the succession dispute started in 1833, and spent her time in the Carlist camp, usually in northern Spain.

Sebastião participated in the second siege of Bilbao and became commander of the Carlist Army of the North from December 30, 1836. He won the Battle of Oriamendi (March 16, 1837) against the British Legion under George de Lacy Evans. Then he led the failed Royal Expedition against Madrid and was sacked upon its return to the north in late 1837.

== Titles ==
On January 15, 1837, during the First Carlist War, the then 23-year-old Sebastian was excluded, by law of the Cortes, ratified by royal decree of Queen Regent Maria Christina, from the Spanish succession, on the grounds that he had joined Don Carlos' rebellion against Isabella II. Sebastian was also declared to be stripped of his Spanish titles and status as a dynast.

The same exclusion was legislated against Sebastian's mother and uncle, the deposed Miguel I of Portugal, as well as Don Carlos and his sons. Following his mothers marriage to Don Carlos in 1838, he became heir presumptive to the Portuguese throne per Miguelist reckoning, and would remain so until the birth of his cousin Infanta Maria das Neves in 1852.

In 1859 Sebastian was restored to his Spanish titles, in conjunction with his second marriage. He returned to Spain from Naples where he had lived since the end of the war in 1839.

== Marriage and family ==
Sebastian first wed his cousin Princess Maria Amalia of the Two Sicilies, but the marriage, which lasted several decades, remained childless. When widowed at the age of 50 he remarried, on 19 November 1860, his cousin Infanta María Cristina of Spain, the niece of his first wife, and two decades his junior. Their three eldest sons, all Spanish dynasts until their marriages, were each granted dukedoms.

Their children, reckoned members of the House of Bourbon-Braganza, were:

- Don Francisco María de Borbón y Borbón, 1st Duke of Marchena (Madrid, 1861 – Neuilly-sur-Seine, 1923), married María del Pilar de Muguiro y Beruete, 1st Duchess of Villafranca de los Caballeros.
- Don Pedro de Alcántara de Borbón y Borbón, 1st Duke of Dúrcal (Madrid, 1862 – Paris, 1892), married María de la Caridad de Madán y Uriondo.
- Don Luis de Jesús de Borbón y Borbón, 1st Duke of Ansola (Madrid, 1864 – Algiers, 1889), married Ana Germana Bernaldo de Quirós y Muñoz, 1st Marquise of Atarfe.
- Don Alfonso María de Borbón y Borbón (Madrid, 1866 – Madrid, 1934), married Julia Méndez y Morales.
- Don Gabriel Jesús de Borbón y Borbón (Pau, 1869 – Madrid, 1889).

The last head of one of these branches, the Duke of Hernani, adopted in the 1970s their distant cousin, Infanta Margarita of Spain, Duchess of Soria, who thus became the next and current Duchess of Hernani.

After the overthrow of Isabella II in 1868 Sebastian moved to Pau, where he tried to reconcile with the Carlist branch of the House of Bourbon, without success.

== Arms ==
Heraldry of Infante Sebastian

Coat of arms of Infante Sebastian

== Ancestors ==
Ancestors of Infante Sebastião of Spain and Portugal

8. Charles III of Spain
4. Infante Gabriel of Spain
9. Maria Amalia of Saxony
2. Infante Pedro Carlos of Spain and Portugal
10. Peter III of Portugal (= 12)
5. Infanta Mariana Vitória of Portugal
11. Maria I of Portugal (= 13)
1. Infante Sebastian of Portugal and Spain
12. Peter III of Portugal (= 10)
6. John VI of Portugal
13. Maria I of Portugal (= 11)
3. Infanta Maria Teresa of Portugal
14. Charles IV of Spain
7. Carlota Joaquina
15. Maria Luisa of Parma
