= Bourbon claim to the Spanish throne =

Dynastic claim

Coat of arms of Philip V, Louis I and Ferdinand VI of Spain

After the death of the last Habsburg monarch of Spain in 1700, the childless Charles II, the Spanish throne was up for grabs between various dynasties of Europe despite Charles having left a will naming his heir. In this will, Charles left the French prince Philip, Duke of Anjou, grandson of Louis XIV, the possessions of the Spanish Crown.

The Austrian Habsburgs, who considered themselves the rightful heirs of Charles II, fearing that the vast domain of the Spanish Crown would be taken over by the French monarchy, formed a European coalition against the Bourbon monarchs of France and Spain, therefore starting the War of the Spanish Succession. In this article, the Bourbon claim to the Spanish Crown and its origins are explained in detail.

== Early French-Spanish relations ==
=== Counts of Barcelona ===
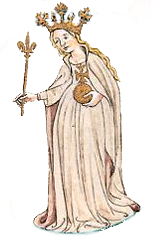
Petronila of Aragon had Aquitanian matrilineal ancestry

What became parts of northern Spain and southern France had strong connections going back hundreds of years. Some dynasties that ruled in Spain had origins going back to the Frankish empire, for example, the rulers of the County of Barcelona were created by Charlemagne as counts when he conquered lands in the Iberian Peninsula north of the river Ebro, and were subservient to the Carolingian dynasty until its decline in 987. The Counts of Barcelona had Provençal ancestry and held the title of the "Count of Provence".

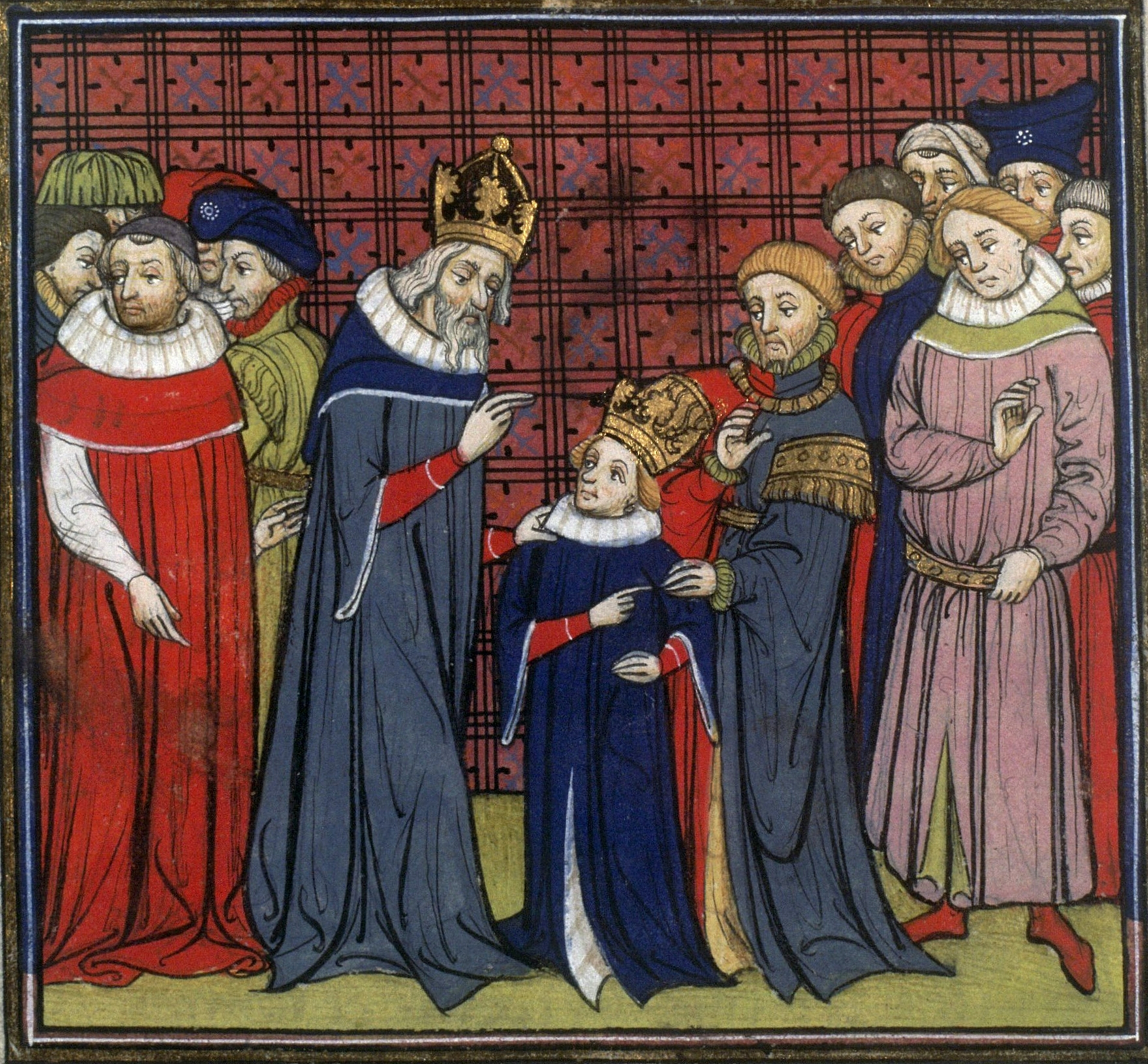
Charlemagne with his son Louis the Child

In the 11th century, the Counts of Barcelona formed a dynastic union with the Kingdom of Aragon, hence Alfonso II of Aragon was the first Count of Barcelona to be crowned King of Aragon, succeeding his mother Petronila of Aragon. Moreover, Alfonso's maternal grandparents were the Duke and Duchess of Aquitaine, making Alfonso a first cousin once removed of the famous French, later English, Queen, Eleanor of Aquitaine.

=== Kingdom of Navarre ===
The Íñiguez dynasty founded by Íñigo Arista, founded the Navarrese kingdom (of Pamplona) in or around 824 when they rebelled against nominal Carolingian authority. In 905, a coalition of neighbors forced Fortún Garcés, a grandson of Íñigo Arista, to retire to a monastery, and enthroned in his place a scion of a new dynasty, under which, the name Navarre began to supplant that of Pamplona. With the assassination of Sancho IV, the last king of the aforementioned dynasty, Navarre was invaded by his cousins Alfonso VI of Castile and Sancho Ramirez of Aragon, and the latter made king, leading to a half-century of Aragonese control.

The coat of arms of the Kingdom of Navarre

The death of Alfonso led to a succession crisis in Aragon, and the nobles of Navarre took advantage to reestablish an independent monarchy, crowning a grandnephew (through an illegitimate brother) of the assassinated Sancho IV. The death of Sancho VII, the last of the Jimenez kings, led to the crown of Navarre being inherited by the son of his sister Blanca, Countess of Champagne, she having been regent during much of her brother's reign. Therefore, her son Theobald, was the first Frenchman to rule Navarre. Through his granddaughter Joan, Queen consort of France, Navarre passed into the control of the House of Capet, succeeded by several Capetian and non-Capetian dynasties.

In accordance to the French law of succession, Henri III of Navarre, succeeded as King of France in 1589. Every succeeding monarch in France assumed the double title of King of France and Navarre. However, by the time Henry became King of Navarre, much of it had been overrun by Aragon. In 1512, John III of Navarre, of the House of Albret, was defeated by Ferdinand II of Aragon, who then conquered southern Navarre for the Crown of Aragon and was crowned king. The monarchs of Navarre after 1512 (including Henri) thus only reigned over Lower Navarre, the part of Navarre north of the Pyrenees.

== Spanish Brides ==
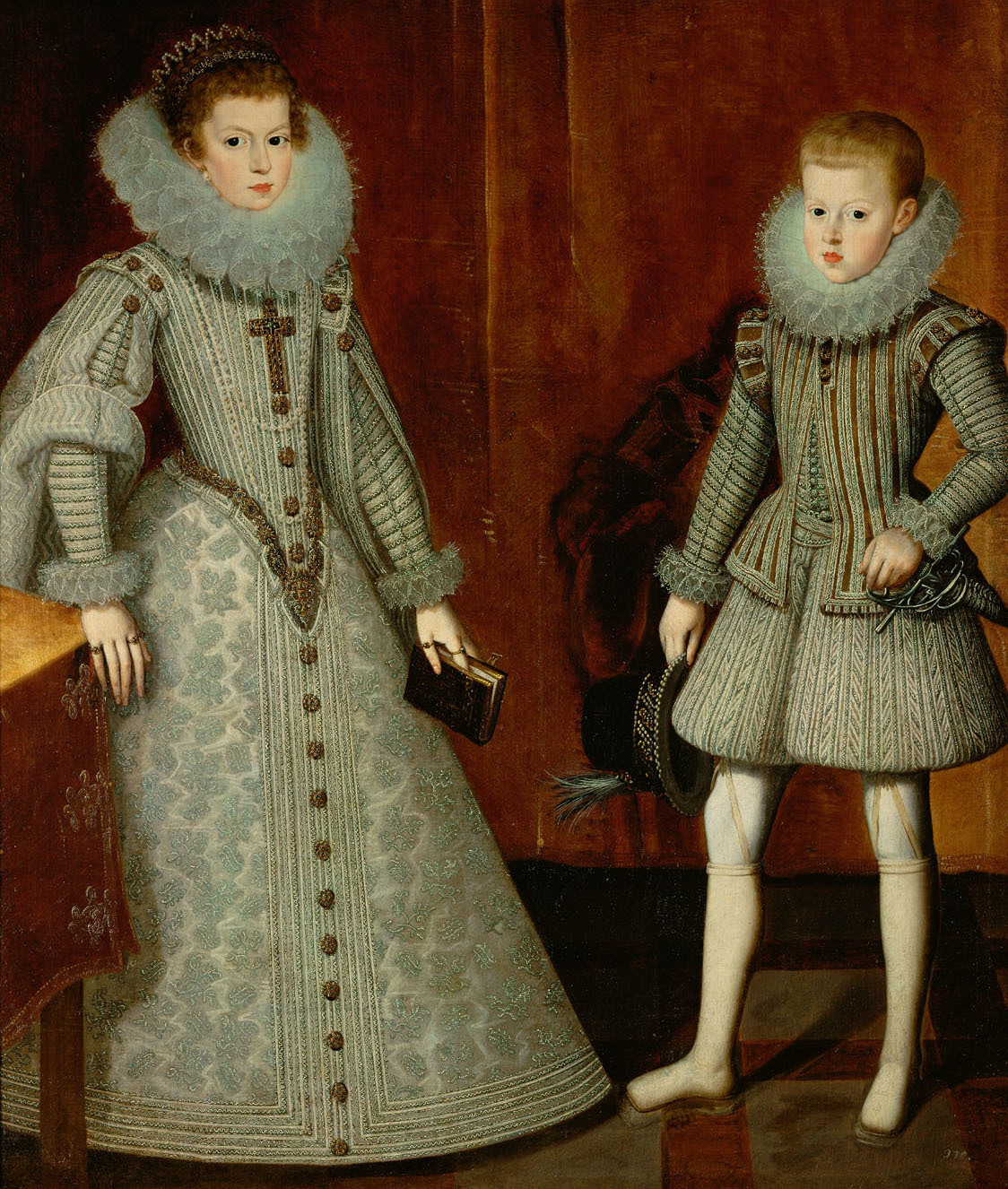
The Infanta Ana, future Queen of France, and her brother, Felipe, future King of Spain, in 1612, by Bartolomé González y Serrano

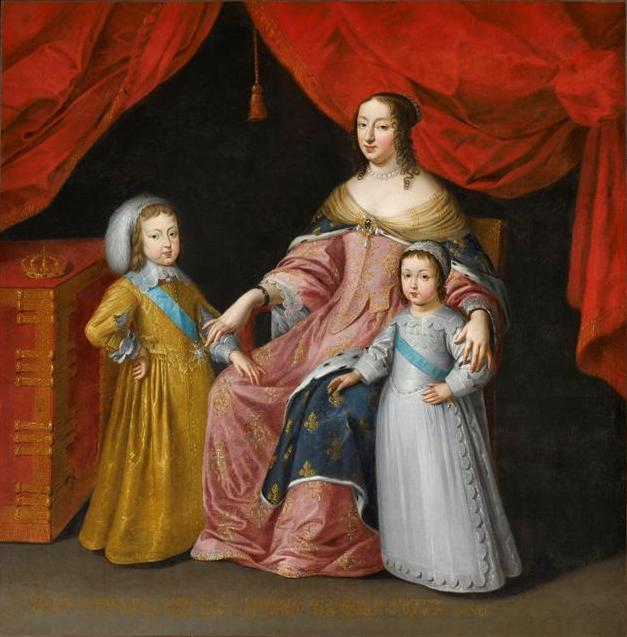
Anne with her two, long-awaited sons: Louis and Philippe.

The first legitimate connection with Spain came with the marriage of Infanta Ana of Spain (Anne of Austria) to Louis XIII. The Infanta was the daughter of Philip III of Spain. As Spanish succession laws did not prevent a female from ascending the throne, she was the heiress presumptive to the throne. Likewise, her offspring would have a legitimate, if not strong, claim to the Spanish throne. Thus, before her marriage, she was made to renounce all succession rights she had had for herself and her descendants by Louis.

Further cementing Habsburg-Bourbon relations, Philip IV, Anna's brother, married Elisabeth, a sister of Louis XIII. This marriage produced the desired male heir and also Maria Theresa of Spain, who was the second link between France and Spain.

Born as Archduchess María Teresa of Austria, Infanta of Spain at the Royal Monastery of El Escorial, María Teresa thus combined the blood of Philip III of Spain and Margarita of Austria, on her father's side, and that of Henry IV of France and Marie de' Medici, on her mother's side. In his turn, Philip III was the son of Philip II of Spain and Anna of Austria who was, herself, a daughter of Maximilian II, Holy Roman Emperor and Maria of Spain. Philip II and Maria of Spain were siblings, being both children of Charles V, Holy Roman Emperor and Isabella of Portugal. María Teresa, therefore, like many Habsburgs, was a product of years and generations of royal intermarriage between cousins.

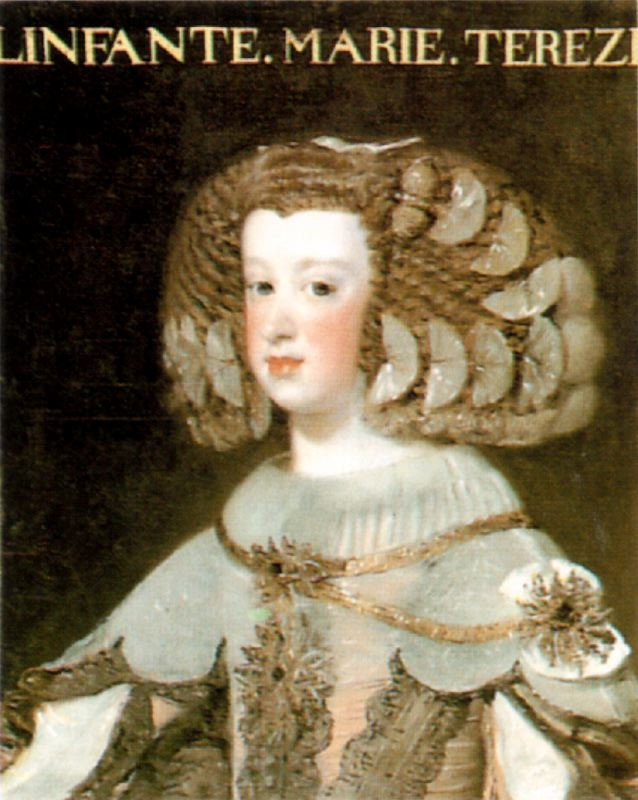
Infanta María Teresa by Diego Velázquez, c.1652

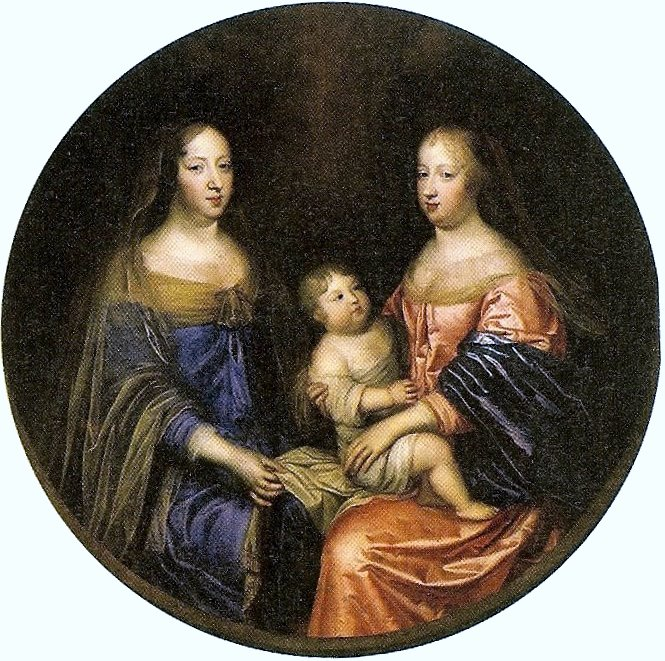
Two Queens of France: Anne d'Autriche with her niece and daughter-in-law, Marie-Thérèse d'Espagne, holding her son Louis

In 1659, as the war with France began to wind down, a union between the two royal families, of Spain and of France, was proposed as a means to secure peace. María Teresa and the French king were double first-cousins, and it was proposed that they wed. His father was Louis XIII, who was the brother of her mother, while her father was brother to Anne of Austria, his mother.

Such a prospect was intensely enticing to Anne of Austria, mother of Louis XIV and aunt of María Teresa, who desired an end to hostilities between her native country, Spain, and her adopted one, France, and who hoped this to come by her niece becoming her daughter-in-law. However, Spanish hesitation and procrastination led to a scheme in which Cardinal Mazarin, the First Minister of France, pretended to seek a marriage for his master with Margaret of Savoy. When Philip IV of Spain heard of the meeting at Lyon between the Houses of France and Savoy, he reputedly exclaimed of the Franco-Savoyard union that "it cannot be, and will not be". Philip then sent a special envoy to the French Court to open negotiations for peace and a royal marriage.

The negotiations for the marriage contract were intense. Eager to prevent a union of the two countries or crowns, especially one in which Spain would be subservient to France, the diplomats sought to include a renunciation clause which would deprive María Teresa and her children of any rights to the Spanish succession. This was eventually done but, by the skill of Mazarin and his French diplomats, the renunciation and its validity were made conditional upon the payment of a large dowry. As it turned out, Spain, impoverished and bankrupt after decades of war, was unable to pay such a dowry, and France never received the agreed sum of 500,000 écus.

== The Last of the Spanish Habsburgs ==
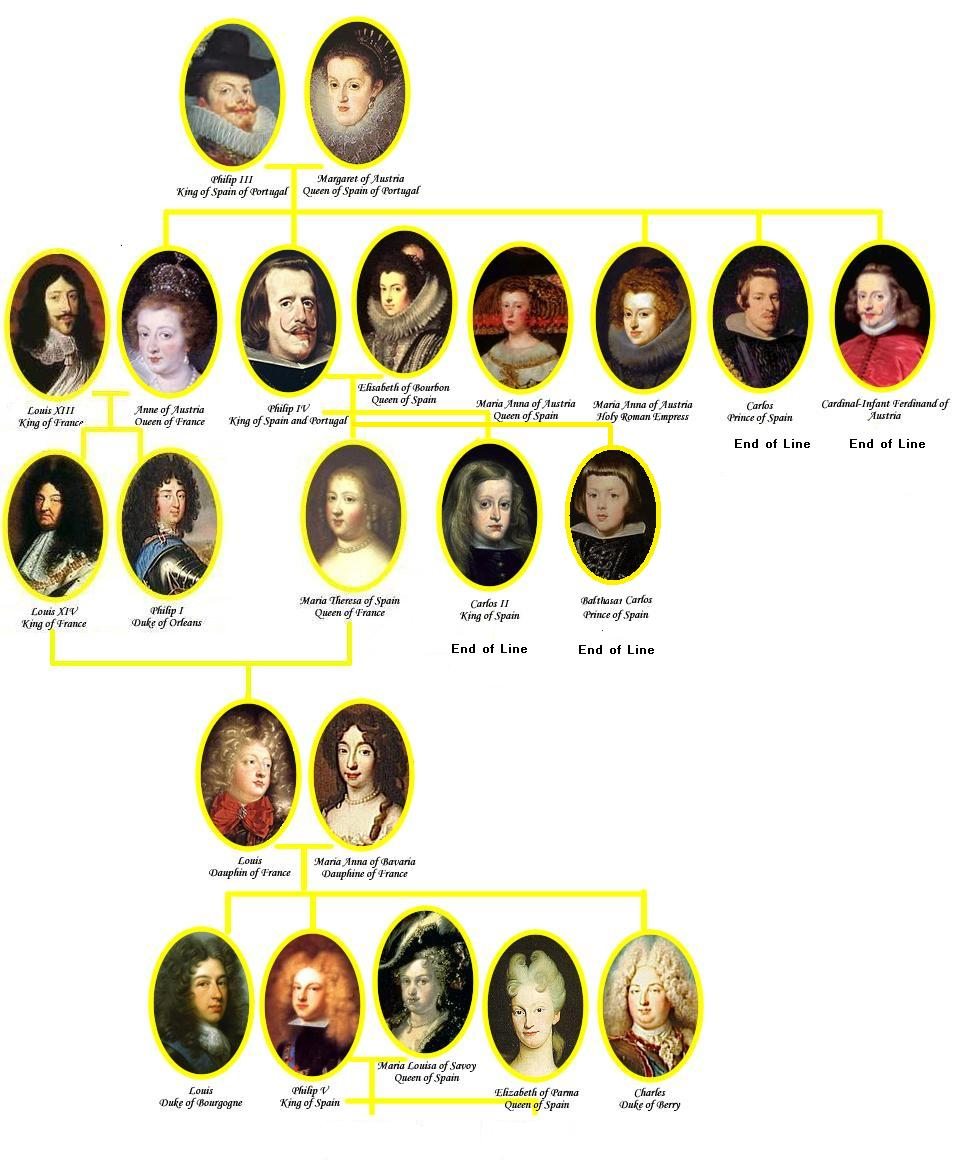
The genealogy of the Spanish House of Habsburg, leading to the Spanish House of Bourbon

The respective marriages of Anne of Austria and Maria Theresa into the French Royal Family would not be thought much of despite Spain's tradition of following cognatic primogeniture (it did not exclude females from reigning on the throne of Spain). The Habsburgs themselves had come into possession of Spain through a female line: Joanna of Castile, the last heir of the joint sovereigns Isabella I of Castile and her husband Ferdinand II of Aragon, as her elder brother and the heir apparent had died childless.

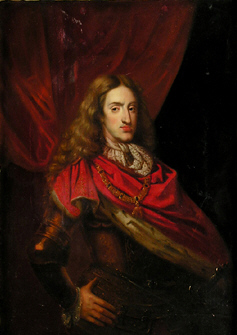
Charles II of Spain. "El Hechizado"

Probably (and similar to what Philip V would later attempt to secure his dynasty's possession of Spain), the Habsburgs wanted to prevent the succession of any other royal house to the throne of Spain through a female line. Fortunately, each Habsburg king had a son to succeed him. Luck apparently ran out with the death of Baltazar Carlos, Philip IV's heir apparent.

Therefore, with her brother's death, as a birthright, María Teresa could inherit the vast Spanish Empire and all the wealth it offered, since there was no restriction in Spanish succession law to the accession of a queen regnant (unlike in France, with its infamous Salic Law). Likewise, if María Teresa refused the throne, it would pass to the next blood descendants, the Austrian Habsburgs, who were also descended from a female line of the Spanish Habsburgs.

Desperate for a male heir and fearing the extinction of the dynasty, Philip married his late son's intended bride, his own niece, Mariana of Austria, the daughter of his sister Maria Anna of Spain (1606–46) and Emperor Ferdinand III.

The degree of inbreeding between the Spanish and Austrian branches of the House of Habsburg came to its zenith with this marriage and likewise, the resultant offspring was a culmination of nearly a century of incestuous marriages. This inbreeding in the Habsburg family genealogy had given many in the family hereditary weaknesses and left later generations prone to still-births. Charles's birth was greeted with joy and relief by the Spaniards, who had feared the dispute which could have ensued if Philip IV left no male heir. However, Charles was mentally and physically disabled as well as disfigured, which in turn limited his efficacy as a leader and earned him the name El Hechizado ("The Hexed") in Spanish history.

Of Maria's six children, only one survived her, the Dauphin Louis, who died in 1711. Marie-Thérèse's grandson, Philip, Duke of Anjou, would eventually come to inherit her rights to the Spanish Throne, after the death of her mentally unstable half-brother Charles II of Spain. He acceded to that throne in 1700. It is through him that her descendants now reign over Spain. The War of the Spanish Succession was caused by this.

Claimant	Portrait	Relationship to Spanish Habsburgs	Rival Claimant	Portrait	Relationship to Spanish Habsburgs
Margaret Theresa of Spain		Daughter of Philip IV of Spain and Mariana of Austria	Leopold I, Holy Roman Emperor		His mother was Maria Anna of Spain, daughter of Philip III of Spain and Margaret of Austria
Joseph Ferdinand, Electoral Prince of Bavaria		His maternal grandmother was the daughter of Philip IV of Spain and Mariana of Austria	Archduke Charles of Austria		His paternal grandmother was Maria Anna of Spain, daughter of Philip III of Spain and Margaret of Austria
Louis, Dauphin of France		His mother was Maria Theresa of Spain, daughter of Philip IV of Spain and Elisabeth of France, and his paternal grandmother was Anne of Austria, daughter of Philip III of Spain and Margaret of Austria	Archduke Charles of Austria		His paternal grandmother was Maria Anna of Spain, daughter of Philip III of Spain and Margaret of Austria
Philip, Duke of Anjou		His paternal grandmother was Maria Theresa of Spain, daughter of Philip IV of Spain and Elisabeth of France, and his paternal great-grandmother was Anne of Austria, daughter of Philip III of Spain and Margaret of Austria, making him simultaneously a great nephew and a great-grandson of Philip IV of Spain, the next-to-last Habsburg ruler of Spain	Archduke Charles of Austria		His paternal grandmother was Maria Anna of Spain, daughter of Philip III of Spain and Margaret of Austria
Charles, Duke of Berry		He was the youngest son of The Grand Dauphin, and younger brother of Philip of Anjou, and was, till the birth of Prince Luis, the heir presumptive to the Throne of Spain	Archduke Charles of Austria		His paternal grandmother was Maria Anna of Spain, daughter of Philip III of Spain and Margaret of Austria

== Philip of Anjou and the French Succession ==
Marie Louise, Charles's beloved first wife

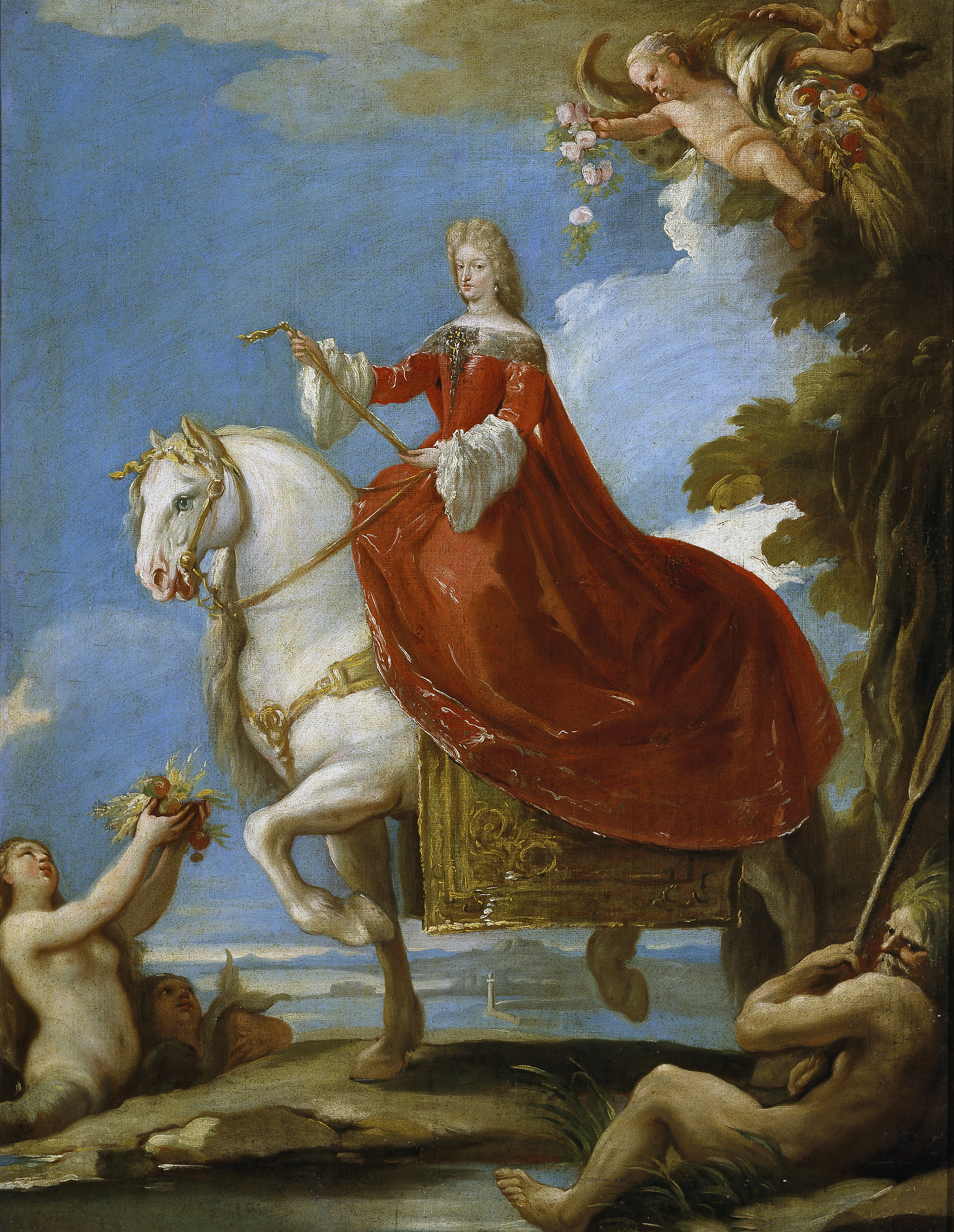
Charles's second wife, Maria Anna of Pfalz-Neuberg

Wives of Charles II

Philip of France, Duke of Anjou, was the second son of Louis, le Grand Dauphin and Maria Anna of Bavaria, known as Dauphine Victoire, a younger brother of Louis, Duke of Burgundy and an uncle of Louis XV. Philip was born at the Palace of Versailles in France. His older brother, Louis, Duke of Burgundy, was in line to the throne right after his father, Le Grand Dauphin, thus leaving him and his younger brother, Charles, Duke of Berry little expectation to ever rule over France. However, his fortune (and that of his grandfather Louis XIV) started looking up when the degenerate last monarch of Spain, Charles II, fell ill. Both of Charles's marriages had failed to produce any offspring.

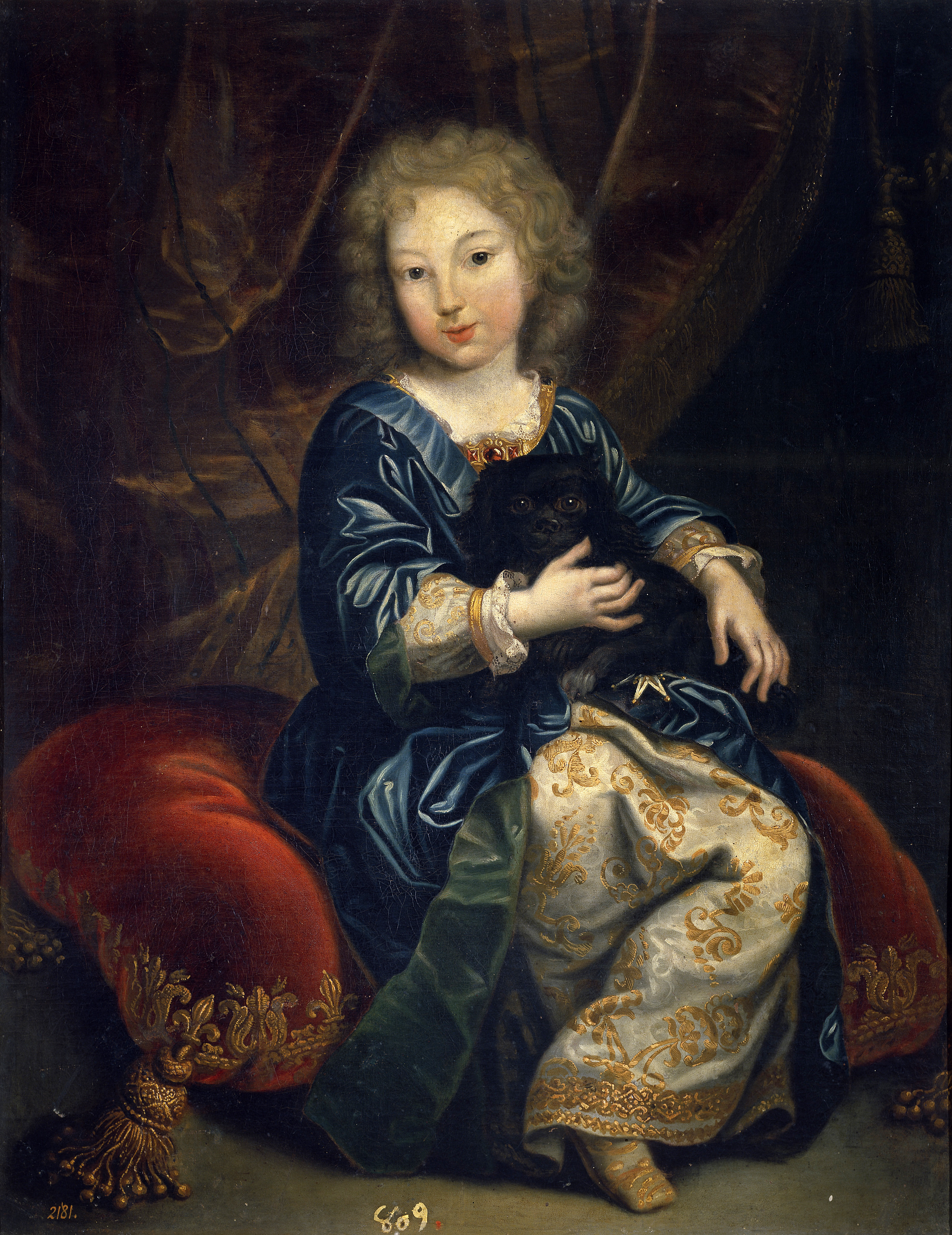
The future Philip V of Spain, as a young child

Charles II married Marie Louise of Orléans (1662–1689), eldest daughter of Philippe I, Duke of Orléans, the only sibling of Louis XIV, and his first wife Princess Henrietta of England. It is likely that Charles was impotent, and no children were born. Marie Louise became deeply depressed and died at 26, ten years after their marriage, leaving 28-year-old Charles heartbroken. Still in desperate need of a male heir, the next year he married the 23-year-old Palatine princess Maria Anna of Neuburg, a daughter of Philip William, Elector of the Palatinate, and sister-in-law of his uncle Leopold I, Holy Roman Emperor. However, this marriage was no more successful than the first in producing the much-desired heir.

Having failed to produce the desired male heir, towards the end of his life, Charles became increasingly hypersensitive and strange, at one point demanding that the bodies of his family be exhumed so he could look upon the corpses. He reportedly wept upon viewing the body of his first wife, Marie Louise.

This spelled good news for his French relatives as they could now forward their dormant claims to the Spanish throne. Initially, Louis XIV wished to further his own ambitions by placing himself on the throne and gaining control of the vast Spanish empire, using his claim as heir to the Spanish throne, through his mother, daughter of Philip III. Among all the contenders, it was Louis XIV's son, Louis the Grand Dauphin, who was the closest heir, as the son of the oldest sister of Charles II.

So when Charles II died in 1700, the line of the Spanish Habsburgs died with him. Charles' last will and testament named the 16-year-old Philip, Duke of Anjou, second son of the Grand Dauphin, as his successor. Upon any possible refusal the Crown of Spain would be offered next to Philip's younger brother Charles, Duke of Berry, or, next, to Archduke Charles of Austria, Charles's cousin from the Austrian branch of the Habsburg dynasty

Both claimants had a legal right due to the fact that Philip's grandfather, Louis XIV, and Charles's father, Holy Roman Emperor Leopold, were both the husbands of Charles' older half sisters and sons of Charles' aunts.

Philip had the better claim because his grandmother and great-grandmother were older than Leopold's. However, the Austrian branch claimed that Philip's grandmother had renounced the Spanish throne for her descendants as part of her marriage contract. This was countered by the French branch's claim that it was on the basis of a dowry that had never been paid.

After a long council meeting where the Dauphin spoke up in favour of his son's rights, it was agreed that Philip would ascend the throne but would forever renounce his claim to the throne of France for himself and his descendants.

However, the spectre of the multi-continental empire of Spain passing under the effective control of Louis XIV provoked a massive coalition of powers to oppose the Duke of Anjou's succession.

Family tree of claimants to the Spanish throne following the death of Charles II

Philip III; King of Spain; 1578–1621	Margaret of Austria; 1584–1611
Ferdinand III; Holy Roman Emperor; 1608–1657	Maria Anna of Spain; 1606–1646
Anne of Austria; 1601–1666	Elisabeth of France; 1602–1644	Philip IV; King of Spain; 1605–1665	Mariana of Austria; 1635–1696
Louis XIV; King of France; 1638–1715	Maria Theresa of Spain; 1638–1683	Charles II; King of Spain; 1661–1700	Margaret Theresa of Spain; 1651–1673	Leopold I Holy Roman Emperor; 1640–1705	Eleonore Magdalene of Neuburg; 1655–1720
Louis; Grand Dauphin of France; 1661–1711	Maria Antonia of Austria; 1669–1692	Charles VI; Holy Roman Emperor; 1685–1740
Louis; Petit Dauphin of France; 1682–1712	Philip V King of Spain; 1683–1746	Charles; Duke of Berry; 1686–1714	Joseph Ferdinand of Bavaria; 1692–1699

Notes
Potential heirs are shown with a golden border. In cases of second marriages, the earlier spouse is to the left and the later to the right.
References
- Durant, W.; Durant, A. (2011). The Age of Louis XIV: The Story of Civilization. New York: Simon & Schuster. ISBN 9781451647655.
- Kamen, H. (2001). Philip V of Spain: The King Who Reigned Twice. New Haven: Yale University Press. ISBN 9780300180541.

== War of Spanish Succession ==
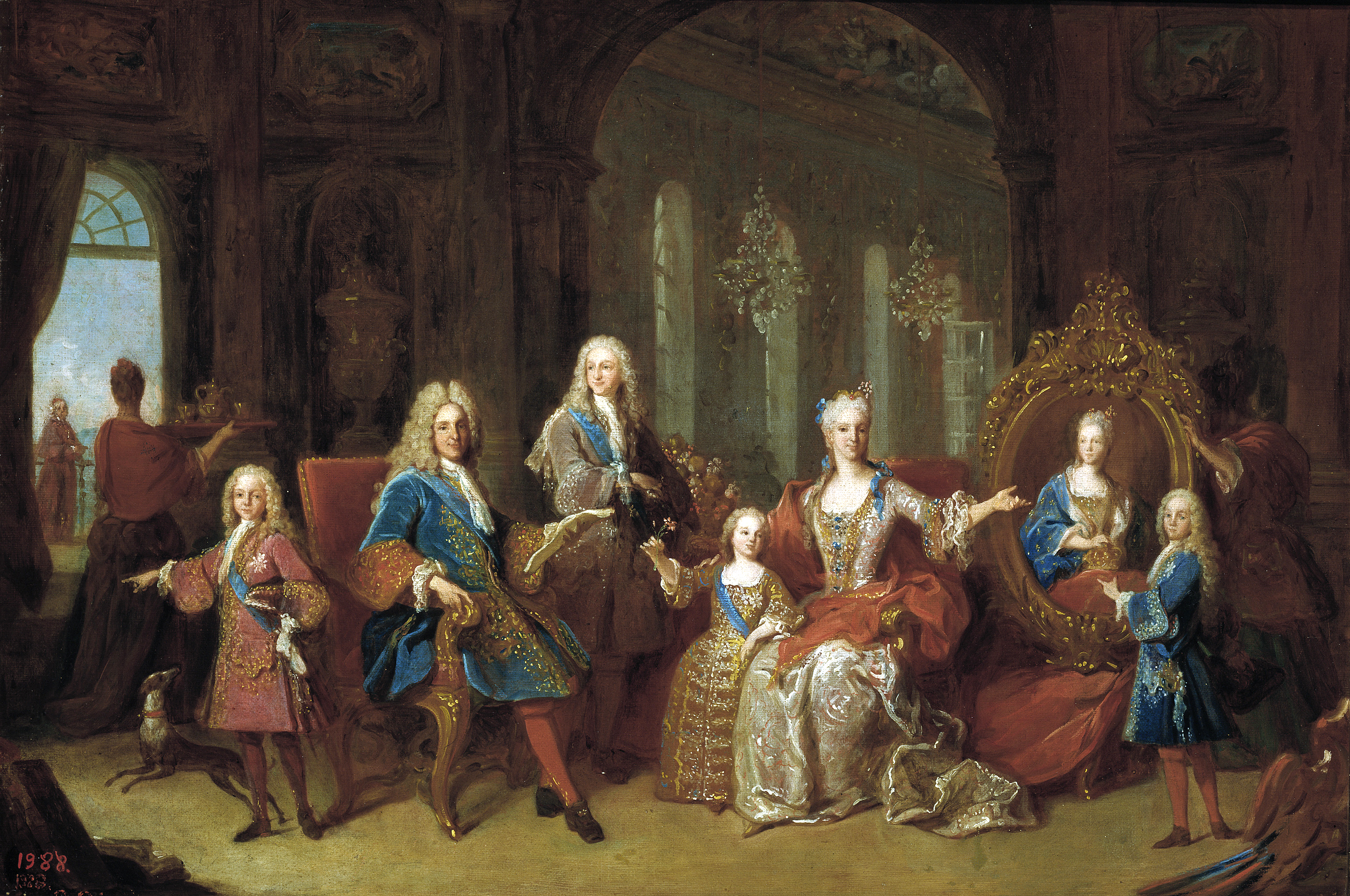
Portrait of Philip V and his family

The actions of Louis heightened the fears of the English, the Dutch and the Austrians, among others. In February 1701, the French king caused the Parlement of Paris (a court) to register a decree that should Louis himself have no heir, the Duke of Anjou – Philip V of Spain – would surrender the Spanish throne for that of the French, ensuring dynastic continuity in Europe's greatest land power.

However, a second act of the French king "justified a hostile interpretation": pursuant to a treaty with Spain, Louis occupied several towns in the Spanish Netherlands (modern Belgium and Nord-Pas-de-Calais). This was the spark that ignited the powder keg created by the unresolved issues of the War of the League of Augsburg (1689–97) and the acceptance of the Spanish inheritance by Louis XIV for his grandson.

Louis' position in the Conseil d'en haut gave him an opportunity to have his voice heard in the years and crises leading up to the War of the Spanish Succession. From his mother, Louis had rights and claims to the Spanish throne. His brother-in-law Charles II of Spain had produced no descendants and, as he lay dying, had no heir to whom he could pass the throne. The choice of a successor was essentially split between the French and Austrian claimants. In order to improve the chances of a Bourbon succession, Louis gave up his rights in favour of his second grandson, Philip, Duke of Anjou, who, as second son of the Grand Dauphin, was not expected to succeed to the French throne, thus keeping France and Spain separate. Moreover, in the discussions in the Conseil d'en haut regarding the French response to Charles II's last will and testament, which did indeed leave all Spanish possessions to Anjou, Louis persuasively argued for acceptance. He opposed those who advocated a rejection of the will and the adherence to the Partition Treaty signed with William III of England, even though that treaty had awarded Naples, Sicily and Tuscany to him.

The War of the Spanish Succession (1702–1713) began. After eleven years of bloody, global warfare, fought on four continents and three oceans, the Duke of Anjou, as Philip V, was confirmed as King of Spain on substantially the same terms that the powers of Europe had agreed to before the war. Thus the Treaties of Utrecht and Rastatt ended the war and "achieved little more than...diplomacy might have peacefully achieved in 1701." A proviso of the peace perpetually forbade the union of the Spanish and French thrones.

The House of Bourbon, founded by Philip V, has intermittently occupied the Spanish throne ever since, and sits today on the throne of Spain in the person of Felipe VI. On 2 June 2014, his father Juan Carlos I, who reigned from 1975–2014, announced that he would abdicate in favour of Felipe on 19 June 2014. Juan and his wife retain their titles.

== See also ==
- House of Bourbon
- Henry IV of France's succession
- Descendants of Henry IV of France
- Descendants of Louis XIV of France
- Descendants of Philip V of Spain
- Descendants of Charles III of Spain
