= Infante Pedro Carlos of Spain and Portugal =

Portuguese and Spanish infante (1786–1812)

Infante Pedro Carlos
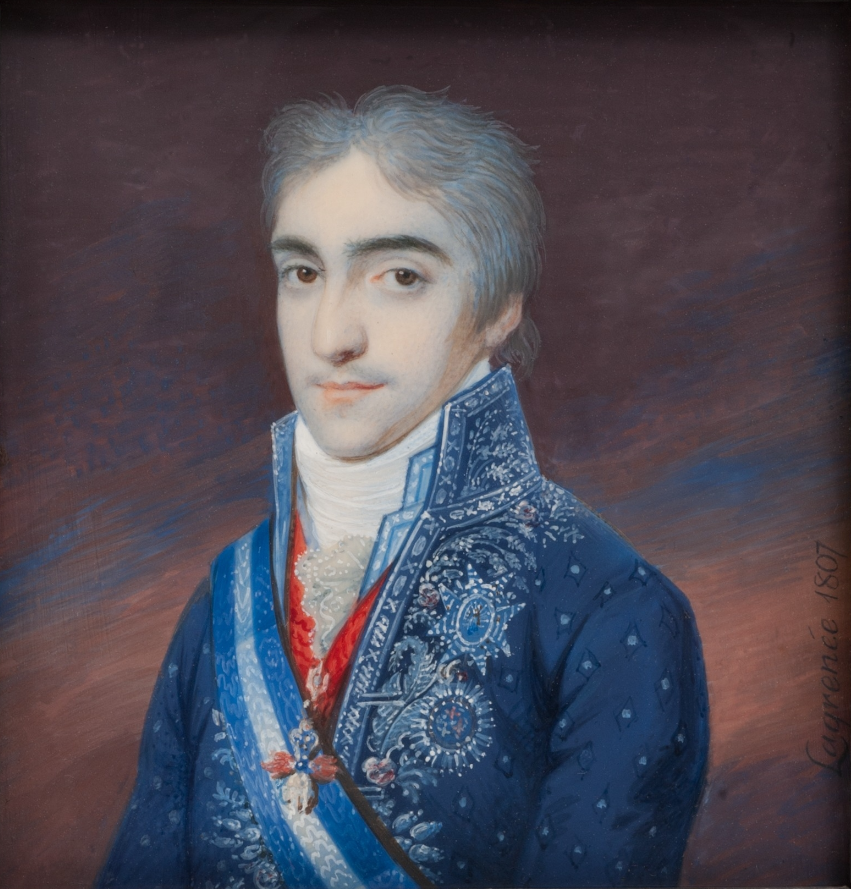
- Portrait by Anthelme-François Lagrenée (1807)
- Born: 18 June 1786; Royal Palace of Aranjuez, Aranjuez, Spain
- Died: 4 July 1812 (aged 26); Palace of São Cristóvão, Rio de Janeiro, Brazil
- Spouse: Infanta Maria Teresa of Braganza (m. 1810)
- Issue: Infante Sebastião
Names
- Pedro Carlos Antonio Rafael José Javier Francisco Juan Nepomuceno Tomás de Villanueva Marcos Marcelino Vicente Ferrer Raimundo
- House: Bourbon-Braganza
- Father: Infante Gabriel of Spain
- Mother: Infanta Mariana Victoria of Portugal

Don Pedro Carlos (Pedro Carlos Antonio Rafael José Javier Francisco Juan Nepomuceno Tomás de Villanueva Marcos Marcelino Vicente Ferrer Raimundo; 18 June 1786 – 4 July 1812) was an Infante of Spain and Portugal.

== Family ==
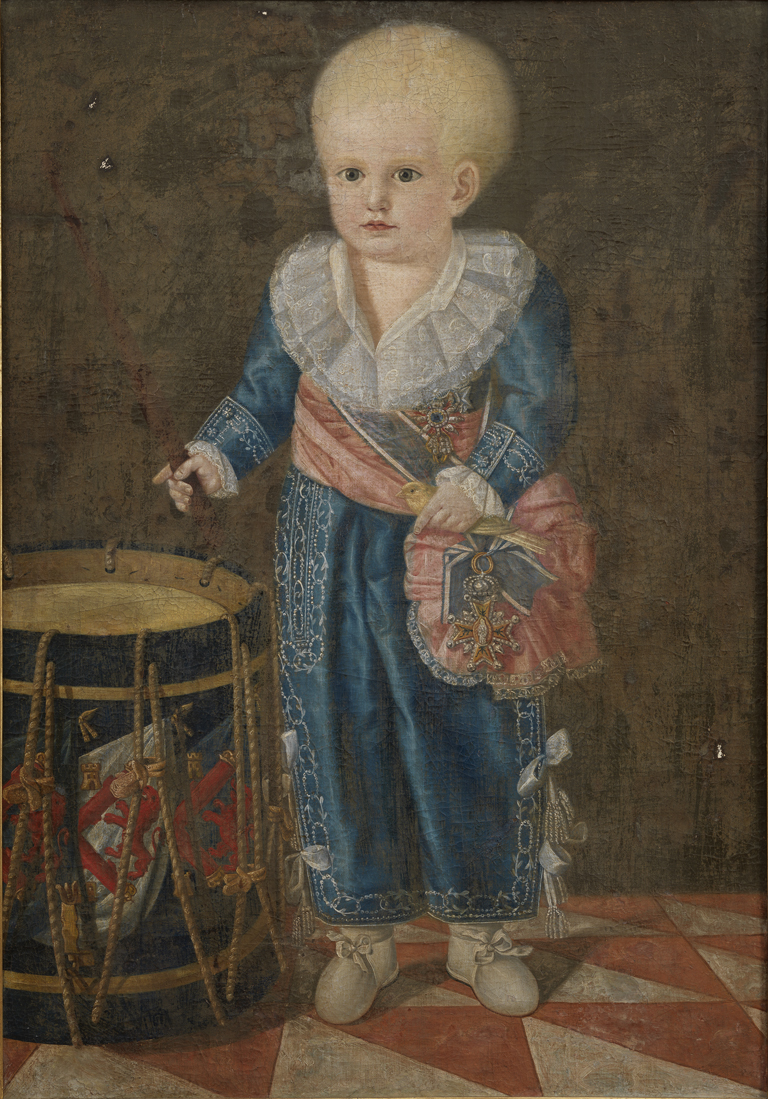
A portrait of infante Pedro Carlos as a child, 1788–89

Infante Pedro Carlos was a son of Infante Gabriel of Spain and Infanta Mariana Victoria of Portugal. His paternal grandfather was King Charles III of Spain and his maternal grandfather was King Peter III of Portugal. Pedro Carlos was the only surviving child of the couple and an orphan at the age of two.

== Life ==
His father, a very intelligent man, was King Charles III's favorite son, but he and his wife died in 1788 of smallpox. King Charles III also died the same year; his successor Charles IV of Spain sent the child away to Portugal, as requested by his grandmother, Queen Maria I of Portugal. Maria was worried about the Braganza succession and Pedro Carlos was then her only grandchild. He was raised by Maria, who created him an infante of Portugal.

Pedro Carlos had inherited a large fortune from his father and was welcomed in Portugal. In 1792 his grandmother was officially declared insane and her son John, uncle of Pedro Carlos, became Regent of Portugal.

In 1807, France invaded Portugal, and the royal family fled to Brazil, including Pedro Carlos. They left on 29 November on board the Príncipe Real.

They arrived in Salvador de Bahia on 2 January 1808 and headed from there to Rio de Janeiro, where the infante lived in the São Cristovão Palace.

== Marriage ==
In Brazil Pedro Carlos was engaged to his cousin Maria Teresa, Princess of Beira, daughter of Carlota Joaquina of Spain and John VI of Portugal, and they married on 13 May 1810 in Rio de Janeiro.

The couple was very happy during their two years of marriage, after which Pedro Carlos became ill and died in Quinta da Boa Vista on 4 July 1812.

The couple had one child:

- Infante Sebastian of Portugal and Spain, born in Río de Janeiro on 4 November 1811.

== Ancestry ==
Ancestors of Infante Pedro Carlos of Spain and Portugal

8. Philip V of Spain
4. Charles III of Spain
9. Elisabeth Farnese
2. Infante Gabriel of Spain
10. Augustus III of Poland
5. Maria Amalia of Saxony
11. Maria Josepha of Austria
1. Infante Pedro Carlos of Spain and Portugal
12. John V of Portugal
6. Peter III of Portugal
13. Maria Anna of Austria
3. Infanta Mariana Vitória of Braganza
14. Joseph I of Portugal
7. Maria I of Portugal
15. Mariana Victoria of Spain
