= Francisco María, Duke of Marchena =

Duke of Marchena (1861–1923)

Francisco María
- Duke of Marchena Order of the Golden Fleece
- Reign: July 30, 1885 – November 17, 1923
- Predecessor: Role established
- Successor: María Cristina de Borbón y Muguiro
- Born: Francisco María Isabel Gabriel Pedro Sebastián Afonso de Borbón y Borbón; August 20, 1861; Madrid, Spain
- Died: November 17, 1923 (aged 62); Neuilly-sur-Seine, Île-de-France, France
- Burial: Château Balincourt, Arronville
- Spouse: Maria Beruete, Duchess of Villa-Franca
- Issue: María Cristina de Borbón y Muguiro; Elena de Borbón y Muguiro; María de los Ángeles de Borbón y Muguiro
- House: Bourbon-Braganza
- Father: Infante Sebastião of Spain and Portugal
- Mother: Infanta María Cristina of Spain

Francisco María, Duke of Marchena (August 20, 1861 – November 17, 1923) was a Spanish nobleman and the first Duke of Marchena. He was born in Madrid, Spain in 1861, and married Maria del Pilar de Muguiro y Beruete, Duchess of Villa-Franca in 1883. He later had three children. He was appointed as the first Duke of Marchena.

== Biography ==
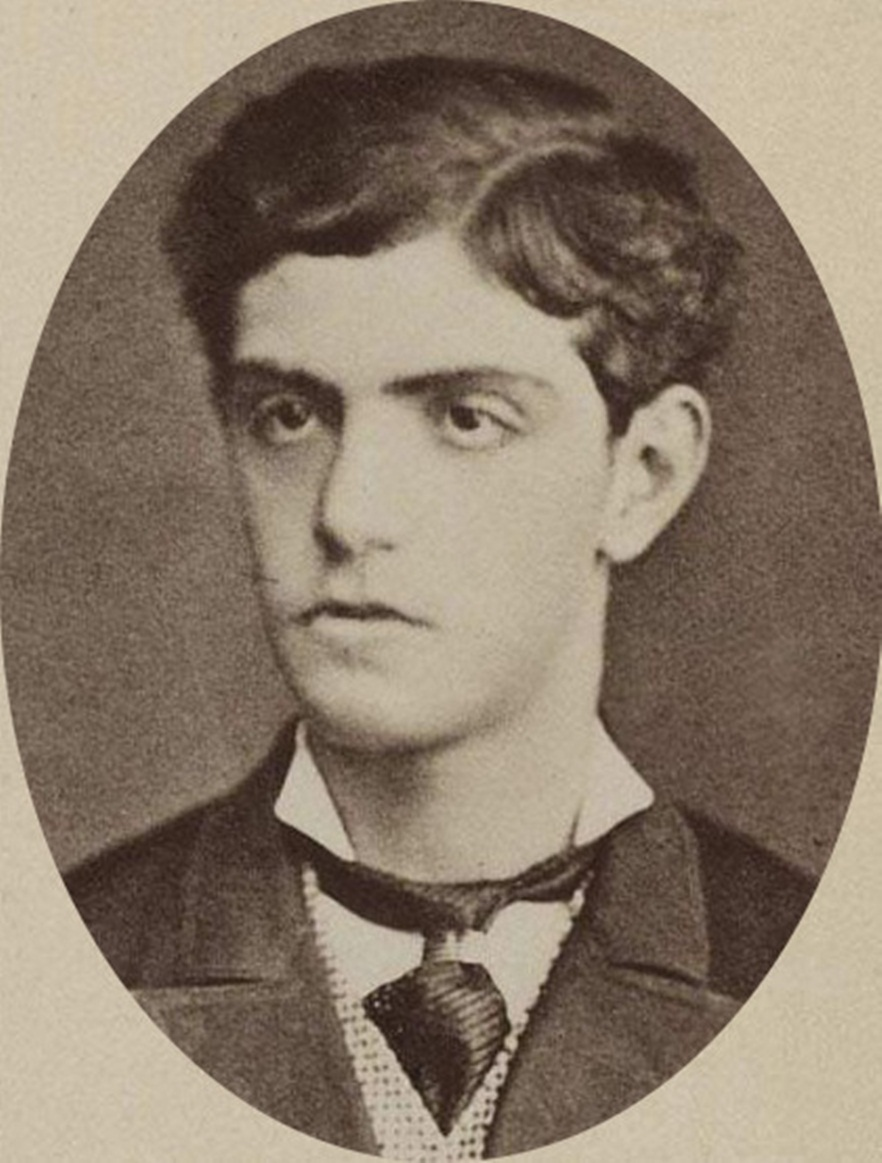
Francisco circa 1880

Francisco was born as Francisco María Isabel Gabriel Pedro Sebastián Afonso de Borbón y Borbón. He was born on August 20, 1861 in Madrid, Spain. He was the eldest son of Infante Sebastião of Spain and Portugal and Infanta María Cristina of Spain, and was closely linked to the Spanish Royal family under the House of Bourbon.

After the Revolution of 1868, he was force to go into exile along with his family. In 1875, he returned following the restoration of the monarchy and the inauguration of his cousin King Alfonso XII. He, along with his siblings, soon went under the guardianship of Alfonso after the death of his father.

Francisco went to the Theresianum Academy in Vienna, Austria alongside his siblings.

Francisco was awarded the Knight of the Order of the Golden Fleece on February 11, 1862. He was later appointed as the Duke of Marchena by Isabella II on July 30, 1885. He died in Neuilly-sur-Seine, France on November 17, 1923. After his death, his wife would marry cannon dealer Basil Zaharoff in September 1924.

== Marriage and family ==
Fransico had 3 children with Maria Beruete, Duchess of Villa-Franca, daughter of Fermín de Muguiro y Azcárate, who got married in 1883. The couple later settled in Paris, France.

- María Cristina de Borbón y Muguiro, 2nd Duchess of Marchena (June 27, 1889 – October 3, 1981)
- Elena de Borbón y Muguiro (July 27, 1890 – 1910)
- María de los Ángeles de Borbón y Muguiro (July 24, 1895 – July 19, 1964)
