= Infanta María Cristina of Spain (1833–1902) =

Infanta of Spain and Portugal (1833–1902)

Infanta Maria Cristina
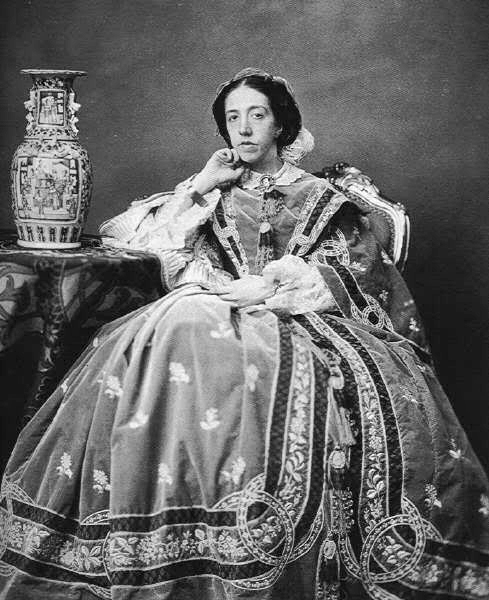
- Born: 5 June 1833; Madrid, Spain
- Died: 19 January 1902 (aged 68); Madrid, Spain
- Burial: San Lorenzo de El Escorial
- Spouse: Infante Sebastião of Spain and Portugal (m. 1860; died 1875)
- Issue: Francisco María de Borbón y Borbón, 1st Duke of Marchena; Pedro de Alcántara de Borbón y Borbón, 1st Duke of Dúrcal; Luis de Jesús de Borbón y Borbón, 1st Duke of Ansola; Alfonso de Borbón y Borbón; Gabriel Jesús de Borbón y Borbón
- House: Bourbon
- Father: Infante Francisco de Paula of Spain
- Mother: Princess Luisa Carlotta of the Two Sicilies

Infanta Maria Cristina of Spain and Portugal (5 June 1833 – 19 January 1902) was the daughter of Infante Francisco de Paula of Spain and Princess Luisa Carlotta of the Two Sicilies. She became an Infanta of Portugal by her marriage to Infante Sebastião of Spain and Portugal.

== Family ==
Maria Cristina was the tenth of eleven children born to Infante Francisco de Paula of Spain and Princess Luisa Carlotta of the Two Sicilies in Madrid. Her father was in turn a younger son of Charles IV of Spain. Her mother was a daughter of Francis I of the Two Sicilies.

Maria Cristina was a sister of Francisco de Asís, the king-consort of Isabella II of Spain, and of Amalia, Princess Adalbert of Bavaria.

== Marriage and children ==
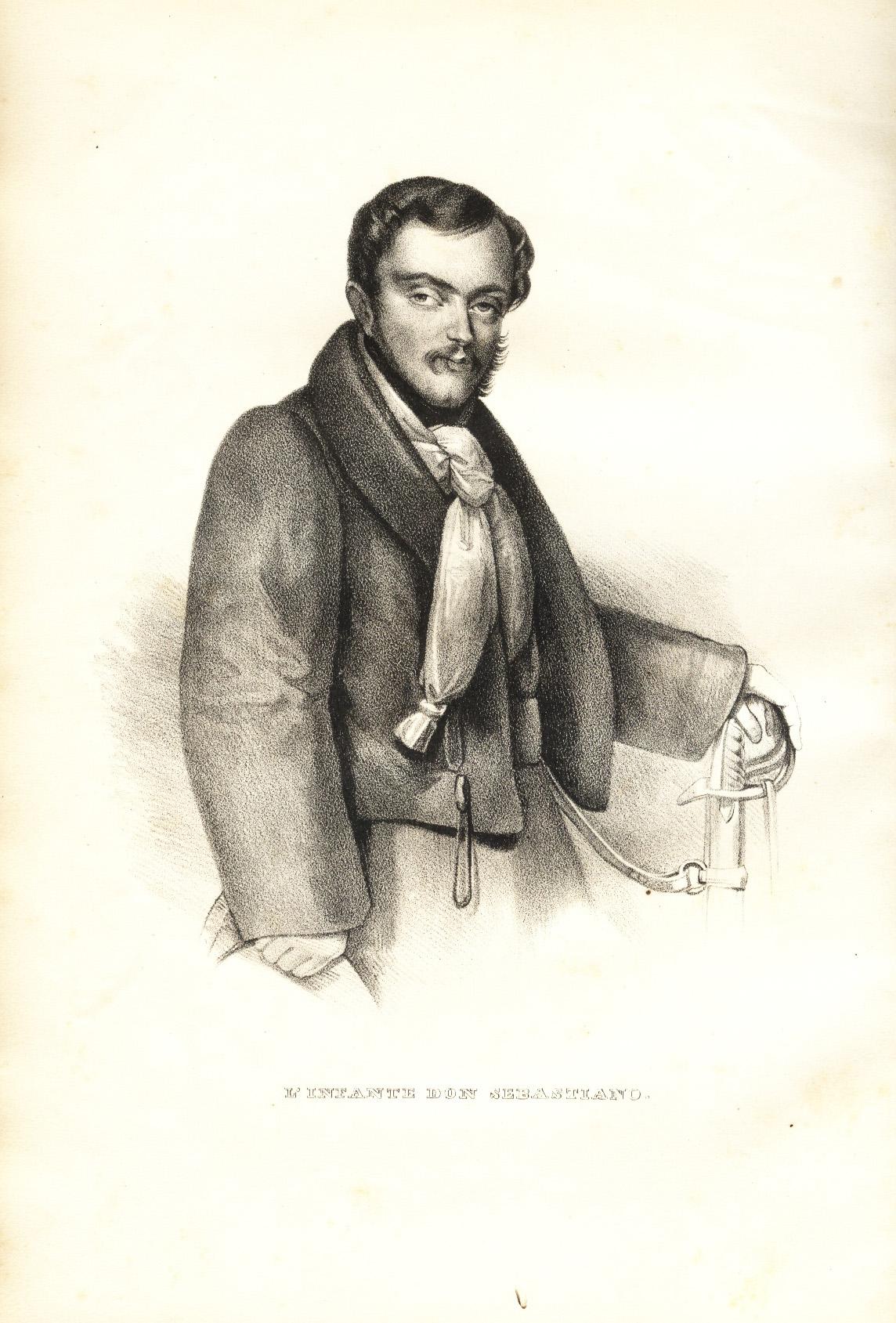
Maria Cristina's husband Infante Sebastian of Portugal and Spain.

On 19 November 1860, Maria Cristina became the second wife of the much older Infante Sebastian of Portugal and Spain, who was a paternal great grandson of Charles III of Spain and a maternal grandson of John VI of Portugal. Sebastian and his immediate family had been in conflict with the Queen Regent Maria Christina, losing all of his titles and claims to the Spanish throne in 1837. He was restored to his Spanish titles upon his second marriage to Maria Cristina, who was both a cousin and a sister-in-law of Queen Isabella II.

The nuptials took place in the Royal Palace of Madrid. In the spirit of reconciliation, the celebration was attended by Isabella II and her husband, among other members of the Spanish royal family. They had five children:

| Name | Birth | Death | Notes |
|---|---|---|---|
| Don Francisco María de Borbón y Borbón, 1st Duke of Marchena | 20 August 1861 | 17 November 1923 | married María del Pilar de Muguiro y Beruete, 1st Duchess of Villafranca de los Caballeros |
| Don Pedro de Alcántara de Borbón y Borbón, 1st Duke of Dúrcal | 1862 | 1892 | married María de la Caridad de Madán y Uriondo |
| Don Luis de Jesús de Borbón y Borbón, 1st Duke of Ansola | 17 January 1864 | 24 January 1889 | married Ana Germana Bernaldo de Quirós y Muñoz, 1st Marquise of Atarfe |
| Don Alfonso María de Borbón y Borbón | 15 November 1866 | 28 April 1934 | married Julia Méndez y Morales |
| Don Gabriel Jesús de Borbón y Borbón | 22 March 1869 | 15 July 1889 | |

== Later life ==
After the overthrow of the monarchy in 1868, Maria Cristina and her family had to leave Spain and take refuge in France. Sebastian died there in 1875. Maria Cristina later returned to Spain, and was able to live calmly until her 1902 death in Madrid. She is buried at the San Lorenzo de El Escorial.

== Heraldry ==
Heraldry of Maria Cristina of Spain

Coat of arms as a married woman
(1860-1875)

Coat of arms as Infanta and widow
(1875-1902)

== Ancestry ==
Ancestors of Infanta María Cristina of Spain

8. Charles III of Spain
4. Charles IV of Spain
9. Maria Amalia of Saxony
2. Infante Francisco de Paula of Spain
10. Philip, Duke of Parma
5. Maria Luisa of Parma
11. Louise-Élisabeth of France
1. Infanta María Cristina of Spain
12. Ferdinand I of the Two Sicilies
6. Francis I of the Two Sicilies
13. Maria Carolina of Austria
3. Princess Luisa Carlotta of the Two Sicilies
14. Charles IV of Spain (= 4)
7. Maria Isabella of Spain
15. Maria Luisa of Parma (= 5)
