= Alfonso de Borbón y Borbón =

Spanish nobleman (1866–1934)

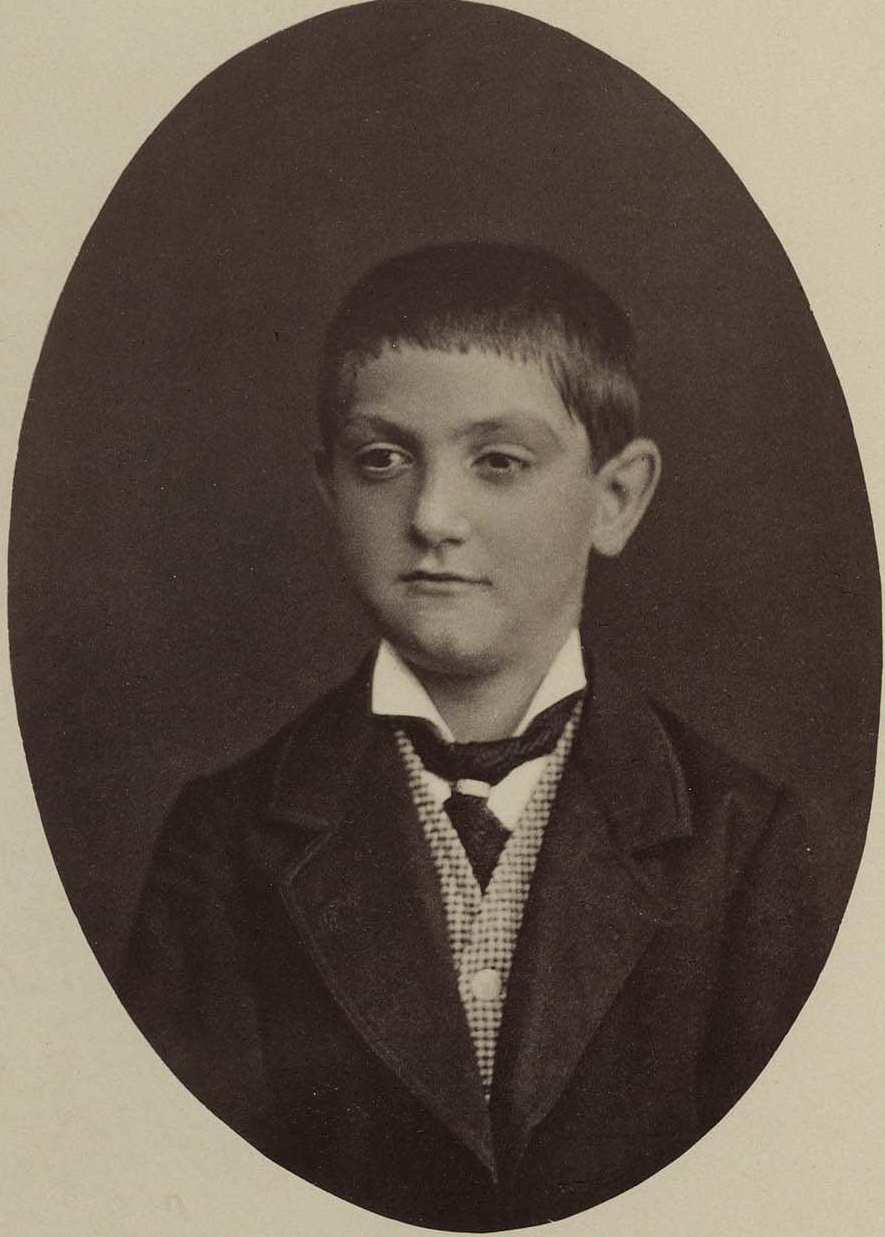
- Alfonso, c. 1876
- Born: 15 November 1866; Madrid, Kingdom of Spain
- Died: 28 April 1934 (aged 67); Madrid, Spanish Republic
- Noble family: House of Bourbon
- Spouse: Julia Mendez y Morales (m. 1929; div. 1931)
- Father: Infante Sebastião of Spain and Portugal
- Mother: Infanta María Cristina of Spain and Portugal

Alfonso de Borbón y Borbón (15 November 1866 – 28 April 1934) was a Spanish nobleman and a great-great-grandson of King Charles III of Spain. He is known for having had 88 forenames, (Note: Some sources incorrectly state 94 forenames. The 88 names include several with more than one word, which are hyphenated. In total, 115 words precede the surname de Borbón y Borbón. His full name, as recorded by Guinness World Records, was Alfonso María Isabel Francisco Eugenio Gabriel Pedro Sebastián Pelayo Fernando Francisco de Paula Pío Miguel Rafael Juan José Joaquín Ana Zacarías Elisabeth Simeón Tereso Pedro Pablo Tadeo Santiago Simón Lucas Juan Mateo Andrés Bartolomé Ambrosio Gerónimo Agustín Bernardo Cándido Gerardo Luis-Gonzaga Filomeno Camilo Cayetano Andrés-Avelino Bruno Joaquín-Picolimini Felipe Luis-Rey-de-Francia Ricardo Esteban-Protomártir Genaro Nicolás Estanislao-de-Koska Lorenzo Vicente Crisóstomo Cristano Darío Ignacio Francisco-Javier Francisco-de-Borja Higona Clemente Esteban-de-Hungría Ladislado Enrique Ildefonso Hermenegildo Carlos-Borromeo Eduardo Francisco-Régis Vicente-Ferrer Pascual Miguel-de-los-Santos Adriano Venancio Valentín Benito José-Oriol Domingo Florencio Alfacio Benére Domingo-de-Silos Ramón Isidro Manuel Antonio Todos-los-Santos de Borbón y Borbón.) recognised as a record for a historical royal person by Guinness World Records.

Alfonso was a son of Infante Sebastian of Portugal and Spain and his second wife, Infanta Maria Christina. In 1929, he morganatically married Julia Méndez y Morales, losing all claims to the Spanish throne; the marriage remained childless and ended in divorce.

== Biography ==
Alfonso de Borbón y Borbón was born on 15 November 1866 in Madrid. He was the fourth child of Infante Sebastián de Borbón y Braganza and Infanta María Cristina de Borbón y Borbón. Despite being born into the Spanish royal family through a marriage of equal rank, he was not granted the title of infante at birth, being a distant Prince of the blood of the Royal family of Spain. His early life was marked by political upheavals. In 1868, a revolution forced him and his family into exile, and they settled in the French town of Biarritz. They returned to Spain in 1875 following the restoration of his cousin King Alfonso XII.

As his father had died in Biarritz a few months before their return, Alfonso and his siblings were placed under the guardianship of King Alfonso XII. They were sent to receive their education at the prestigious Theresianum in Vienna. After completing his education and returning to Spain, Alfonso declined a ducal title offered by the Regent Queen, as he believed it would diminish the significance of his noble lineage as the son of two Spanish infantes and would overshadow the prominence of the Borbón name.

Alfonso de Borbón was initiated as a novice knight in the Order of Alcántara, and was also a knight of the Portuguese Order of Christ and Order of Saint Benedict of Aviz. He served as the president of the Spanish Red Cross.

In 1929, Alfonso married Julia Méndez Morales in San Sebastián, but the marriage ended in divorce with the advent of the Second Spanish Republic. In 1933, he received the title Prince of Borbón and was granted the style of Alteza (Highness) by the Carlist pretender Alfonso Carlos I. Alfonso de Borbón died in Madrid on 28 April 1934 without issue. He was laid to rest in the San Isidro Cemetery.
