= Infanta Mariana Vitória of Braganza =

Mariana Vitória of Portugal
- Infanta Gabriel of Spain
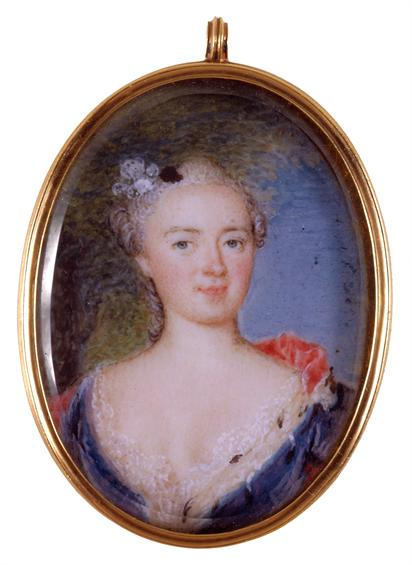
- Mariana Vitória, circa 1785-1788
- Born: 15 December 1768; Royal Palace of Queluz, Lisbon, Kingdom of Portugal and the Algarves
- Died: 2 November 1788 (aged 19); Casita del Infante, El Escorial, Spain
- Burial: El Escorial, Spain
- Spouse: Infante Gabriel of Spain (m. 1785)
- Issue: Infante Pedro Carlos; Infanta Maria Carlota; Infante Carlos
Names
- Mariana Vitória Josefa Francisca Xavier de Paula Antonieta Joana Domingas Gabriela de Bragança
- House: Braganza
- Father: Peter III of Portugal
- Mother: Maria I of Portugal

Mariana Victoria of Portugal (or of Braganza; Portuguese: Mariana Vitória; pronounced [mɐɾiˈɐnɐ]; full name: Mariana Vitória Josefa Francisca Xavier de Paula Antonieta Joana Domingas Gabriela de Bragança; Portuguese: [mɐˈɾiɐ ˈɐnɐ viˈtɔɾiɐ ʒuˈzɛfɐ]; 15 December 1768 – 2 November 1788) was a Portuguese Infanta (princess), the eldest daughter of Queen Maria I of Portugal and her king-consort, Infante Pedro of Portugal.

== Biography ==
Mariana Victoria was born at the Royal Palace of Queluz, near Lisbon, on 16 December 1768. She was named after her maternal grandmother, Mariana Victoria of Spain, a daughter of Philip V of Spain.

Her grandmother Mariana went to Spain in 1777 to discuss an alliance with her brother Charles III of Spain. While there, she helped to arrange the marriage of Mariana Victoria and the Spanish king's younger son, Infante Gabriel. They married by proxy on 12 April 1785 at the Ducal Palace of Vila Viçosa. The couple met for the first time at the Royal Palace of Aranjuez on 23 May and had another nuptial ceremony.

The royal couple had three children, two of whom died in infancy. At the birth of their youngest child, Infante Carlos, Mariana and her husband were residing at Gabriel's private residence, the Casita del Infante at El Escorial. Mariana developed a fever following the birth, and red spots soon appeared on her skin. She died of smallpox on 2 November 1788. Infante Carlos and Infante Gabriel also contracted the disease and died in the weeks that followed.

Upon her early death, her son Pedro was recognized by his Portuguese grandmother as an infante of Portugal, in addition to his Spanish infantizado from their paternal side. The same status was accorded Pedro's only son Sebastian of Portugal and Spain.

Mariana and her husband were the founders of the House of Bourbon-Braganza which subsequently joined the Spanish nobility as dukes of Marchena, Durcal, Hernani and Ansola.

Mariana Victoria was buried at the Royal Monastery of El Escorial with her husband and her two young children.

=== Issue ===
- Infante Pedro Carlos Antonio Rafael Jose Javier Francisco Juan Nepomuceno Tomas de Villanueva Marcos Marcelino Vicente Ferrer Raymundo of Spain (Royal Palace of Aranjuez, 18 June 1786 – Rio de Janeiro, 4 July 1812), married Infanta Teresa, Princess of Beira; had issue;
- Infanta Maria Carlota Josefa Joaquina Ana Rafaela Antonieta Francisca de Asis Agustina Madalena Francisca de Paula Clotilde Lutgarda Te of Spain (Casita del Infante, 4 November 1787 – Casita del Infante, 11 November 1787).
- Infante Carlos José Antonio of Spain (Casita del Infante, 28 October 1788 – Casita del Infante 9 November 1788).

== Ancestry ==
Ancestors of Infanta Mariana Vitória of Braganza

8. Peter II of Portugal
4. John V of Portugal
9. Maria Sophia of Neuburg
2. Peter III of Portugal
10. Leopold I, Holy Roman Emperor
5. Maria Anna of Austria
11. Eleonore Magdalene of Neuburg
1. Mariana Victoria of Portugal
12. John V of Portugal (= 4)
6. Joseph, King of Portugal
13. Maria Anna of Austria (= 5)
3. Maria I of Portugal
14. Philip V of Spain
7. Mariana Victoria of Spain
15. Elisabeth Farnese
