= Casita del Infante =

Historic building in San Lorenzo de El Escorial, Spain

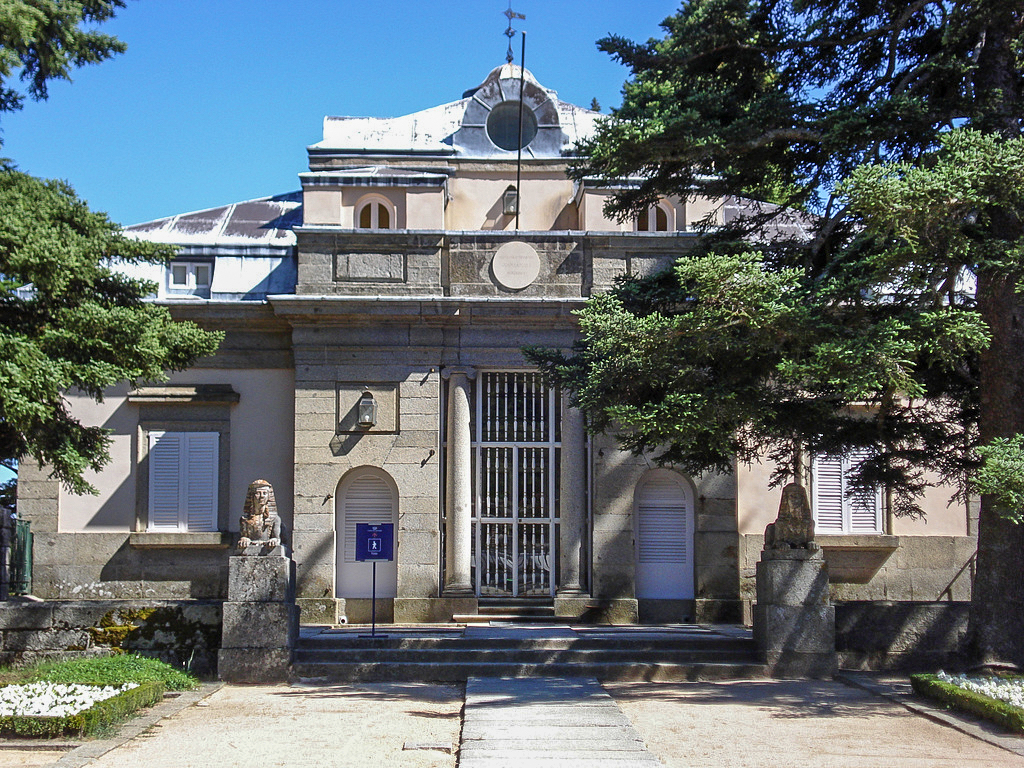
- Interactive map of Casita del Infante

General information
- Architectural style: Neoclassical
- Location: San Lorenzo de El Escorial, Spain

Design and construction
- Architect: Juan de Villanueva

Spanish Cultural Heritage
- Official name: Casita del Infante
- Type: Non-movable
- Criteria: Monument
- Designated: 1992
- Reference no.: RI-51-0007309

The Casita del Infante (Spanish for 'Cottage of the Infante') is a historic building in San Lorenzo de El Escorial, Spain. It was constructed as a private home for the Infante Gabriel of Spain, hence its name. The small residence was built in the late 18th century during the reign of his father, Charles III of Spain.

The Casita was built in an era when it was popular for nobles and royalty to have a small "hideaway" where they could entertain informally. The most famous example of this is the Petit Trianon at Versailles.

== History ==
The Casita was built near the Renaissance monastery-palace of El Escorial between 1771 and 1773. The building was designed in Neoclassical style by the prominent architect Juan de Villanueva, whose best-known building is the Museo del Prado in Madrid. Villanueva also designed the Casita del Príncipe, the private residence of Gabriel's older brother Charles, Prince of Asturias. The two casitas form a pair, with the Casita del Infante having the alternative name of Casita de Arriba (the upper casita), indicating its position relative to the Casita del Principe.

Patrimonial Nacional, the state agency for Spanish royal sites, is responsible for managing the property, which is open to the public. The gardens of the building were designed in the Italian style and still remain today even if they are slightly less lavish. The original decoration has been lost; one ceiling can still be seen and was painted by Vicente Gómez; the ceiling shows the Four Seasons.

=== Royal residents ===
It was at the Casita that Infante Gabriel saw the birth of his two last children by his wife Infanta Mariana Vitória of Portugal: the Infanta Maria Carlota (4 November 1787 – 6 November 1787) and his second son the Infante Carlos (28 October 1788 – 9 November 1788); the two children died at the Casita as well. Infante Gabriel as well as his wife caught smallpox in 1788 and died at the Casita. The couple, as well as the Infante Carlos, were buried at the Royal Monastery of San Lorenzo de El Escorial which can be seen from the Casita with beautiful views.

== See also ==
- Imperial Route of the Community of Madrid – Spanish regional tourist itinerary
