= Peter III of Portugal =

King of Portugal from 1777 to 1786

Peter III
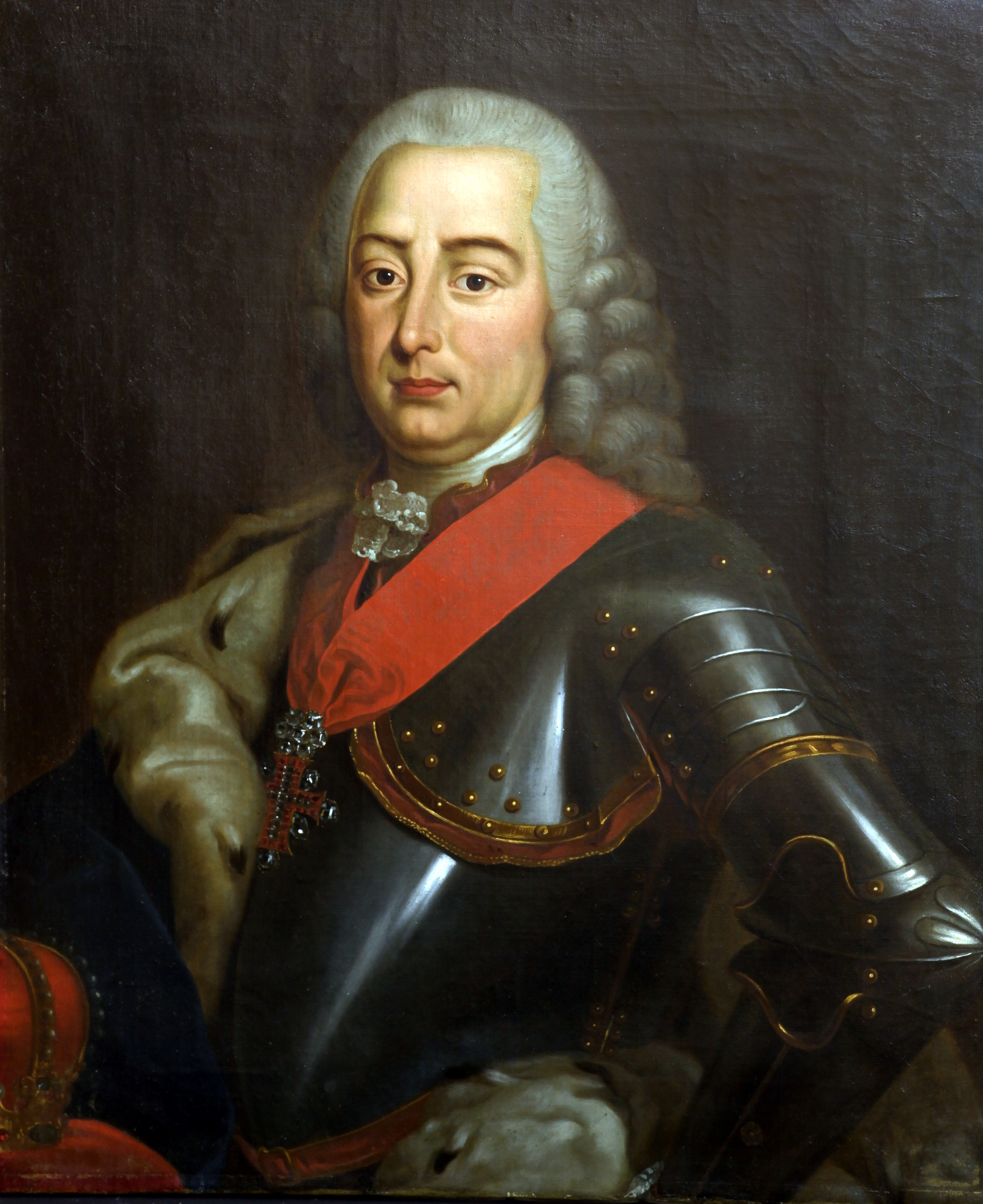
- Portrait, c. 1777–1786

King of Portugal
- Reign: 24 February 1777 – 25 May 1786
- Predecessor: Joseph I
- Successor: Maria I
- Co-monarch: Maria I
- Born: 5 July 1717; Lisbon, Portugal
- Died: 25 May 1786 (aged 68); Queluz, Portugal
- Burial: Pantheon of the Braganzas
- Spouse: Maria I of Portugal (m. 1760)
- Issue Detail: Joseph, Prince of Brazil; John VI, King of Portugal; Infanta Mariana Victoria
Names
- Portuguese: Pedro Clemente Francisco José António
- House: Braganza
- Father: John V of Portugal
- Mother: Maria Anna of Austria
- Religion: Roman Catholicism

Dom Peter III (Portuguese: Pedro III, pronounced [ˈpeðɾu tɨɾˈsɐjɾu]; 5 July 1717 – 25 May 1786), nicknamed the Builder, was King of Portugal from 24 February 1777 to his death in 1786, by marriage to his niece Queen Dona Maria I.

== Early life ==
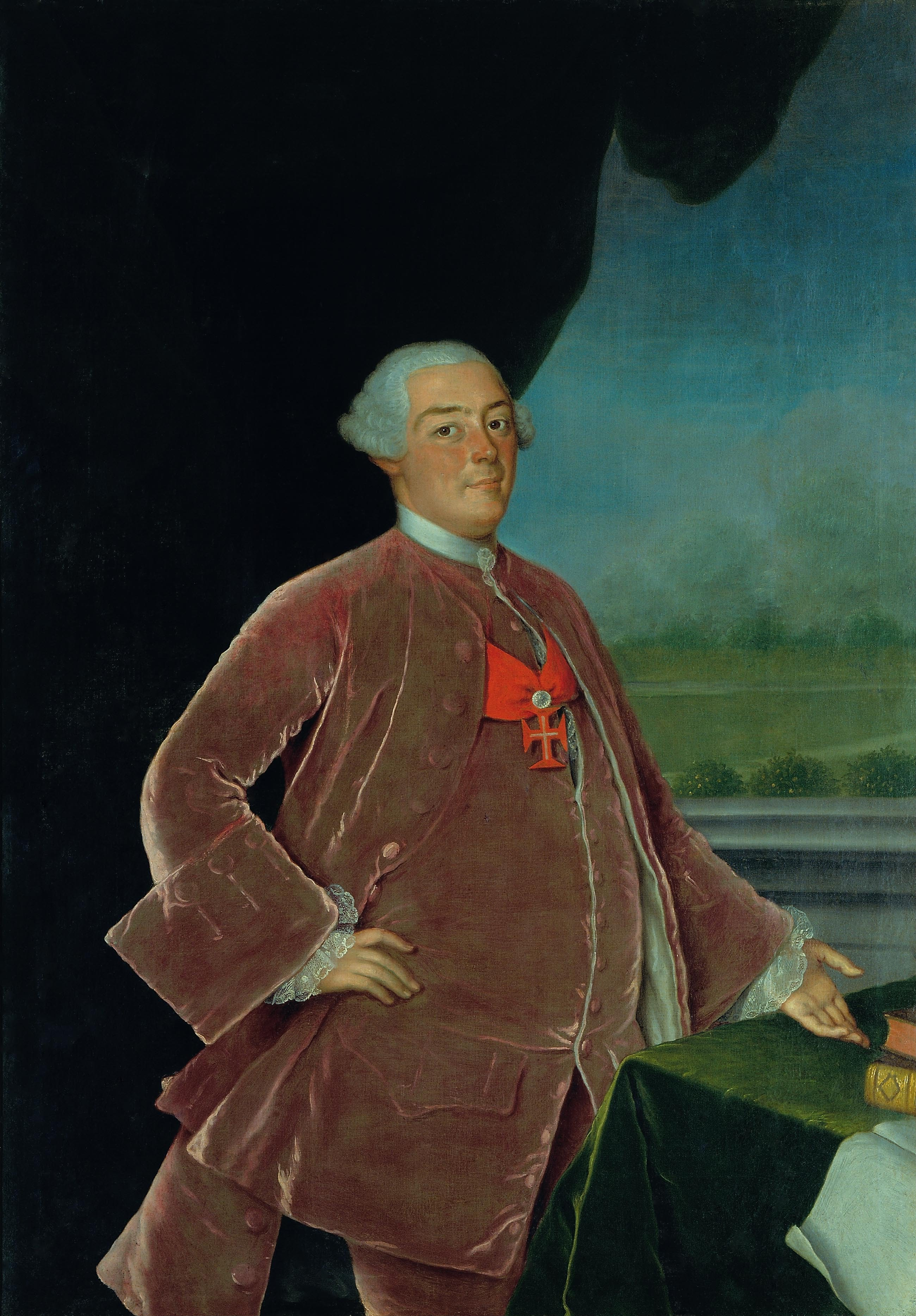
Infante Peter while Lord of the Infantado, c. 1760–70.

Peter was born at 12:00 noon on 5 July 1717 in the Ribeira Palace in Lisbon, Portugal. He was baptized on 29 August and was given the name Peter Clemente Francisco José António. His parents were King John V of Portugal and his wife Maria Ana of Austria. Peter was a younger brother of Joseph I of Portugal. Their maternal grandparents were Leopold I, Holy Roman Emperor, and Eleonor Magdalene of Neuburg, sister of Queen Maria Sofia of Portugal.

== Reign ==
Peter married his niece Maria, Princess of Brazil, in 1760, at which time she was the heiress presumptive to the throne then held by his brother Joseph I. According to custom, Peter thus became King of Portugal in right of his wife, after the delivery of his first born child. They had six children, of whom the eldest surviving son succeeded Maria as John VI of Portugal on her death in 1816.

Peter made no attempt to participate in government affairs, spending his time hunting or in religious exercises.

He also defended the high nobility of Portugal, and sponsored the petitions of those accused in Távora affair, whose rehabilitation was subject of new lawsuits, in which the heirs demanded the restitution of their confiscated properties.

Peter III was moderately friendly toward the Jesuits, who had been banished from Portugal and its overseas empire in 1759, largely at the behest of the Marquis of Pombal. Peter III had taken some of his early education from the Jesuits, explaining this. His affection had little effect; Pope Clement XIV ordered the Jesuits suppressed across Europe in 1773.

== Marriage and issue ==
The couple married on 6 June 1760. At the time of their marriage, Maria was 25 and Peter was 42. Despite the age gap, the couple had a happy marriage. Peter automatically became co-monarch (as Peter III of Portugal) when Maria ascended the throne, as a child had already been born from their marriage. The couple had six children.

Royal styles of King Pedro III of Portugal
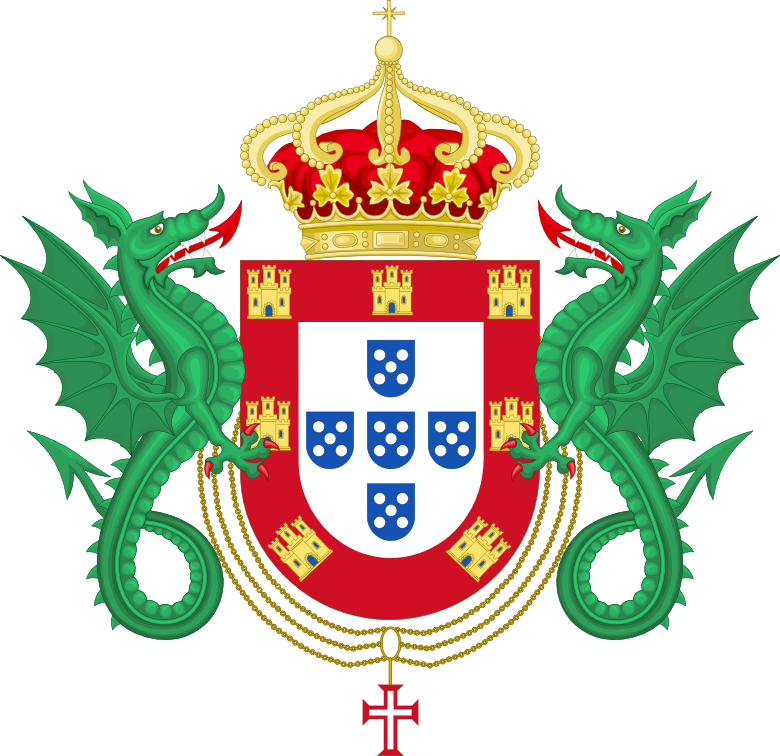
- Reference style: His Most Faithful Majesty
- Spoken style: Your Most Faithful Majesty
- Alternative style: Sire

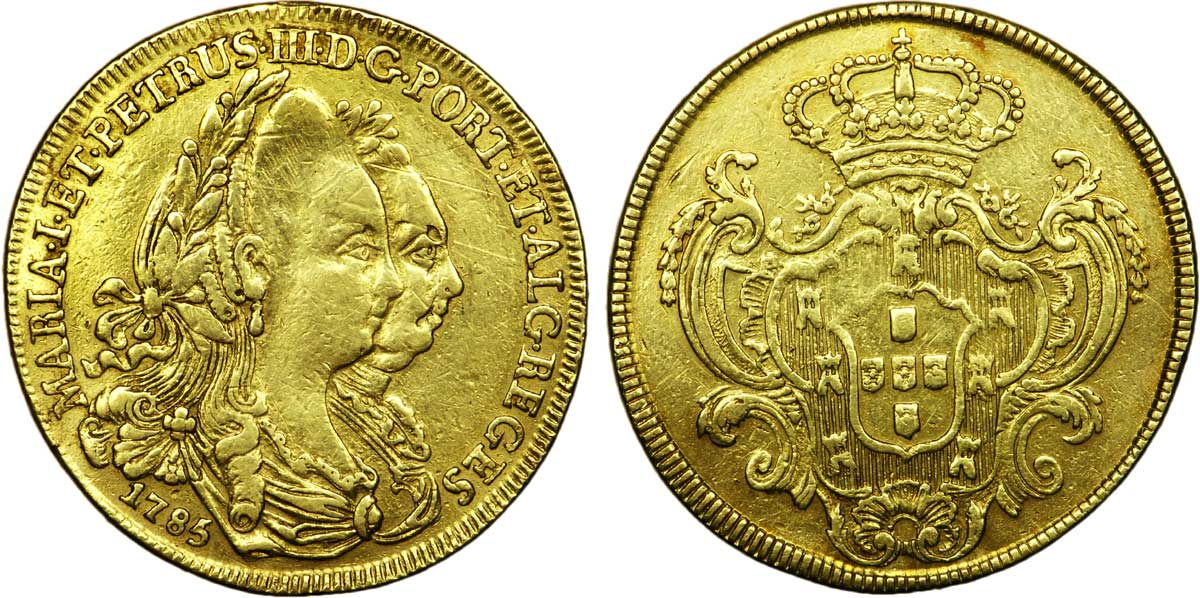
Effigy of Maria I and Peter III, 1785

Name	Birth	Death	Notes
José, Prince of Brazil	20 August 1761	11 September 1788	José Francisco Xavier de Paula Domingos António Agostinho Anastácio married Infanta Benedita of Portugal and had no issue. His death lead to his younger brother becoming heir-apparent and later king.
João Francisco de Bragança	16 September 1763	10 October 1763	João Francisco de Paula Domingos António Carlos Cipriano was born at the Ajuda National Palace.
João VI	13 May 1767	10 March 1826	João Maria José Francisco Xavier de Paula Luís António Domingos Rafael married Carlota Joaquina of Spain and had issue. He was King of Portugal and Emperor of Brazil.
Mariana Victoria de Bragança	15 December 1768	2 November 1788	Maria Ana Vitória Josefa Francisca Xavier de Paula Antonieta Joana Domingas Gabriela married Infante Gabriel of Spain and had issue.
Maria Clementina de Bragança	9 June 1774	27 June 1776	Maria Clementina Francisca Xavier de Paula Ana Josefa Antónia Domingas Feliciana Joana Michaela Júlia was born at the Queluz National Palace.
Maria Isabel de Bragança	12 December 1776	14 January 1777	Maria Isabel was born at the Queluz National Palace.

== Ancestors ==
Ancestors of Peter III of Portugal

8. John IV of Portugal
4. Peter II of Portugal
9. Luisa de Guzmán
2. John V of Portugal
10. Philip William, Elector Palatine
5. Maria Sophia of Neuburg
11. Elisabeth Amalie of Hesse-Darmstadt
1. Peter III of Portugal
12. Ferdinand III, Holy Roman Emperor
6. Leopold I, Holy Roman Emperor
13. Maria Anna of Austria
3. Maria Anna of Austria
14. Philip William, Elector Palatine (= 10)
7. Eleonore Magdalene of Neuburg
15. Elisabeth Amalie of Hesse-Darmstadt (= 11)

== Notes ==
Peter III of Portugal House of Braganza Cadet branch of the House of Aviz Born: 5 July 1717 Died: 25 May 1786
Regnal titles
Preceded by Joseph I	King of Portugal; 24 February 1777 – 25 May 1786 with Maria I	Succeeded by Maria I as sole monarch
Portuguese royalty
Preceded by Francisco	Lord of the House of the Infantado; Duke of Beja; 5 July 1717 – 6 July 1760	Succeeded by João
