= Infante Gabriel of Spain =

Spanish infante (1752–1788)

Gabriel of Spain
- Infante of Spain
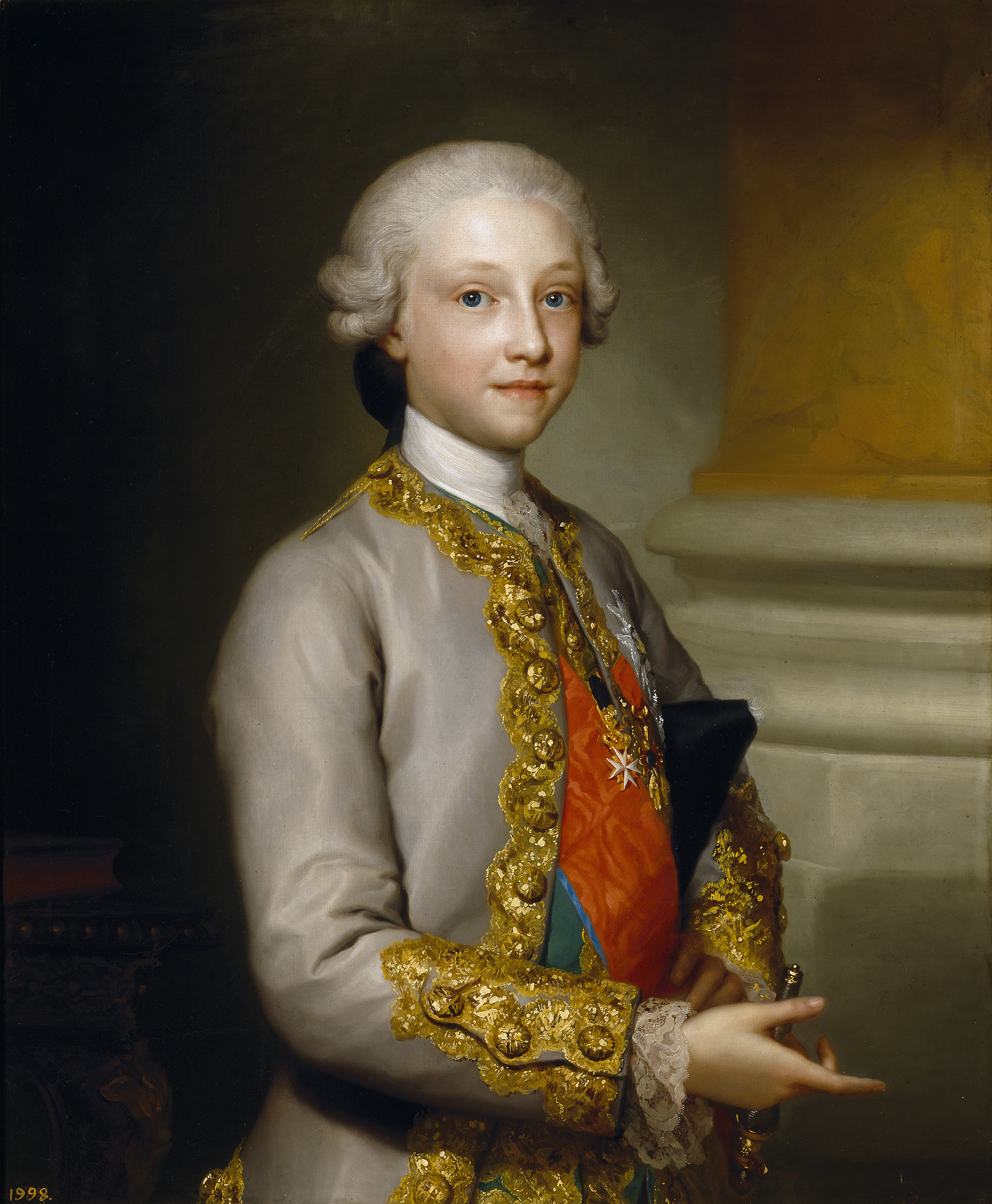
- Portrait by Anton Raphael Mengs, 1767
- Born: 12 May 1752; Palace of Portici, Naples
- Died: 23 November 1788 (aged 36); Casita del Infante, El Escorial, Spain
- Burial: El Escorial
- Spouse: Infanta Mariana Vitória of Portugal (m. 1785; died 1788)
- Issue: Infante Peter Charles; Infanta Maria Carlota; Infante Charles
Names
- Gabriel Antonio Francisco Javier Juan Nepomuceno José Serafín Pascual Salvador
- House: Bourbon
- Father: Charles III of Spain
- Mother: Maria Amalia of Saxony

Coat of arms of Infante Gabriel of Spain.

Infante Gabriel of Spain (12 May 1752 – 23 November 1788) was the son of King Charles III of Spain and Maria Amalia of Saxony.

== Biography ==
Born at the Palace of Portici outside Naples, he was Christened Gabriel Antonio Francisco Javier Juan Nepomuceno José Serafín Pascual Salvador; he was the fourth son of King Charles VII and V and Maria Amalia of Saxony; his father was the King of Naples and Sicily as part of a personal union from 1735.

Of all the sons of Charles III, Gabriel was the most intelligent and hardworking, and he was also his favourite son. He was very cultured, renowned as an excellent translator of Sallust and a true Maecenas. He had Antonio Soler as his music teacher, who composed several sonatas on harpsichord especially for his gifted pupil, as well as concerts for two organs to be interpreted together in the El Escorial church.

Gabriel spent his childhood growing up in his father's Neapolitan kingdom; at the age of seven, he moved with his parents and older siblings Infante Charles and Infanta Maria Luisa to live in Madrid. His half-uncle Ferdinand VI of Spain died without heir in 1759, so his father became Charles III of Spain by default. In Naples he left his two other brothers Infante Philip, Duke of Calabria (who was disabled and thus excluded from succession to any of his father's domains) and the eight-year-old Ferdinand, King of Naples and Sicily; Ferdinand was put in the care of a Regency council that ran the Kingdom till 1767.

While in Spain his brother married Maria Luisa of Parma in 1765; the couple did not have any issue until 1771; Gabriel was third in line to the Spanish Throne during that period. Prior to the birth of King Ferdinand's first son, Gabriel was heir presumptive to his throne from 1759 to 1775. He was later made the Grand Prior of the Orden Hospitalaria de San Juan in Castilla y León. In 1771 he instructed Juan de Villanueva to build the so-called Casita del Infante.

In 1785, Henrique de Meneses, 3rd Marquis of Louriçal, arranged his marriage to Infanta Maria Ana Vitória of Portugal; she was the daughter of Maria I of Portugal and Peter III of Portugal. They were second cousins, as Mariana Vitória's grandmother, Queen Mariana Victoria, was the sister of Gabriel's father. Mariana Victoria had a proxy ceremony on 12 April 1785 in Lisbon; they met for the first time at Aranjuez on 23 May. The couple had three children but only one survived infancy; their eldest child, Infante Peter Charles, was later made an Infante of Portugal by his grandmother who had him raised at her court at Royal Palace of Queluz.

At the birth of his last child, Infante Charles, he and his wife were in residence at Gabriel's Casita del Infante at El Escorial. While there, Gabriel caught smallpox and died at 36. His wife succumbed to the illness also and died, aged the following week at just 19, on 2 November; Infante Carlos died himself a week after his mother.

The three were all buried at the El Escorial complex. Gabriel's death deeply affected his father, who died three weeks later.

=== Issue ===
- Infante Pedro Carlos Antonio Rafael José Javier Francisco Juan Nepomuceno Tomás de Villanueva Marcos Marcelino Vicente Ferrer Raimundo of Spain (Royal Palace of Aranjuez, 18 June 1786 – Rio de Janeiro, 4 July 1812), married Infante Teresa, Princess of Beira; had issue;
- Infanta María Carlota Josefa Joaquina Ana Rafaela Antonieta Francisca de Asís Agustina Magdalena Francisca de Paula Clotilde Lutgarda Te of Spain (Casita del Infante, 4 November – Casita del Infante, 11 November 1787) died in childhood.
- Infante Carlos José Antonio of Spain (Casita del Infante, 28 October – Casita del Infante 9 November 1788) died in infancy.

== Ancestry ==
Ancestors of Infante Gabriel of Spain

8. Louis, Dauphin of France
4. Philip V of Spain
9. Maria Anna Victoria of Bavaria
2. Charles III of Spain
10. Odoardo Farnese, Hereditary Prince of Parma
5. Elisabeth Farnese
11. Dorothea Sophie of Neuburg
1. Infante Gabriel of Spain
12. Augustus II of Poland
6. Augustus III of Poland
13. Christiane Eberhardine of Brandenburg-Bayreuth
3. Maria Amalia of Saxony
14. Joseph I, Holy Roman Emperor
7. Maria Josepha of Austria
15. Wilhelmine Amalie of Brunswick
