= Infante Francisco Javier of Spain =

Spanish infante

Infante Francisco Javier
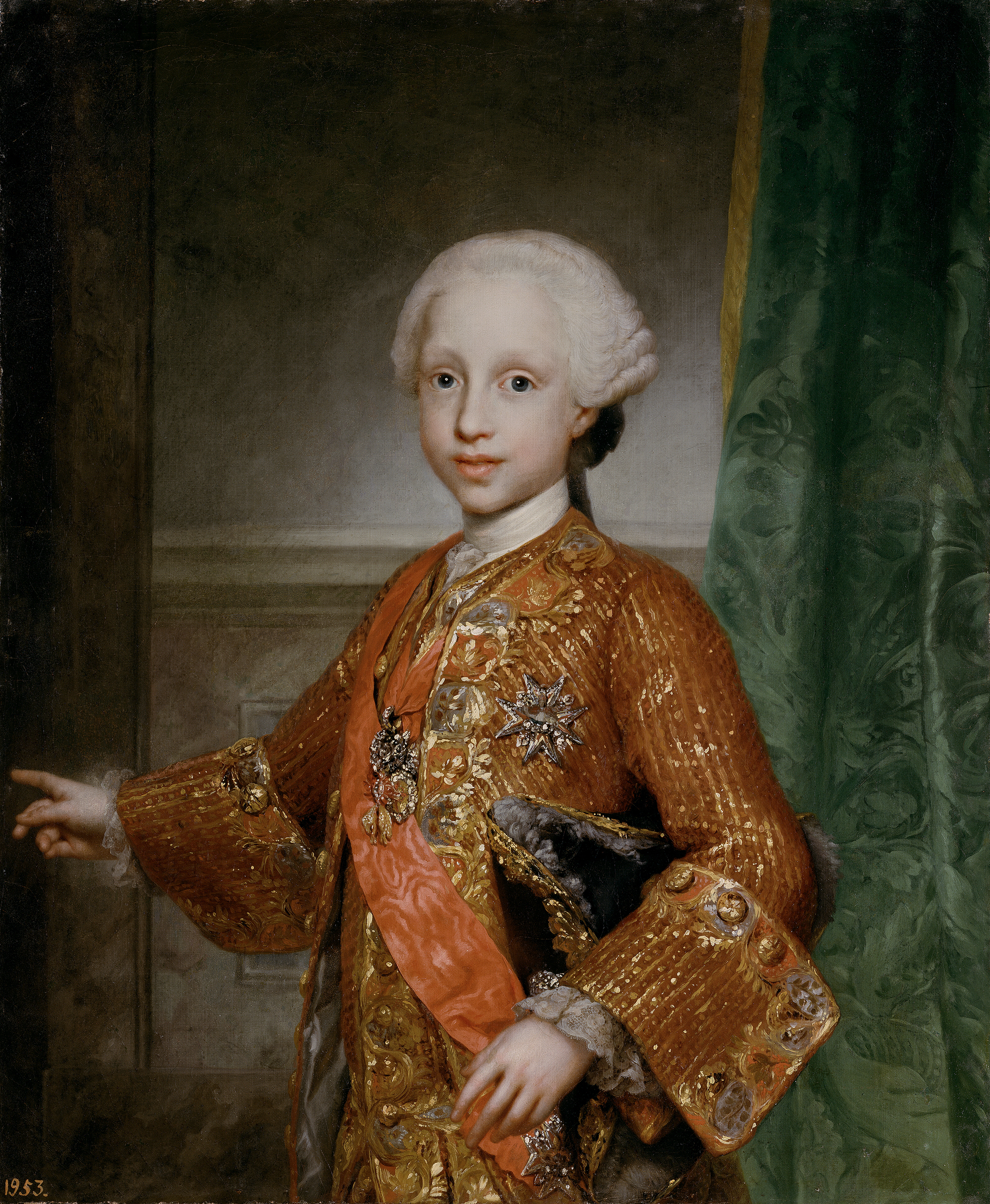
- Portrait by Anton Raphael Mengs (Prado Museum)
- Born: 15 February 1757; Royal Palace of Caserta, Naples
- Died: 10 April 1771 (aged 14); Royal Palace of Aranjuez, Spain
- Burial: El Escorial, Spain
Names
- Francisco Javier Antonio Pascual Bernardo Francisco de Paula Juan Nepomuceno Julián de Borbón y Sajonia
- House: Bourbon
- Father: Charles III of Spain
- Mother: Maria Amalia of Saxony

Infante Francisco Javier of Spain (15 February 1757 – 10 April 1771) was the youngest son of King Charles III of Spain and younger brother of King Charles IV of Spain and King Ferdinand I of the Two Sicilies.

== Biography ==
Born in the Royal Palace of Caserta, he was baptized Francisco Javier Antonio Pascual Bernardo Francisco de Paula Juan Nepomuceno Julián of Naples and Sicily. His father was Charles VII, King of Naples and of Sicily since 1735. His mother was Maria Amalia of Saxony, daughter of Augustus III of Poland.

In 1759, on the death of his uncle King Ferdinand VI of Spain without children, his parents, his brothers Charles and Gabriel, and his sisters, Maria Luisa and Maria Josefa left for Spain where her father was crowned King Charles III of Spain.

Francisco Javier lost his mother one year later when he was three. He grew up at the Royal Palace of Aranjuez, but died of smallpox on 10 April 1771 at the age of 14.

He was buried at the El Escorial Monastery.

== Ancestry ==
Ancestors of Infante Francisco Javier of Spain

8. Louis, Dauphin of France
4. Philip V of Spain
9. Maria Anna Victoria of Bavaria
2. Charles III of Spain
10. Odoardo Farnese, Hereditary Prince of Parma
5. Elisabeth Farnese
11. Dorothea Sophie of Neuburg
1. Infante Francisco Javier of Spain
12. Augustus II of Poland
6. Augustus III of Poland
13. Christiane Eberhardine of Brandenburg-Bayreuth
3. Maria Amalia of Saxony
14. Joseph I, Holy Roman Emperor
7. Maria Josepha of Austria
15. Wilhelmine Amalie of Brunswick
