= Infante Antonio Pascual of Spain =

Spanish prince (1755–1817)

Infante Antonio Pascual
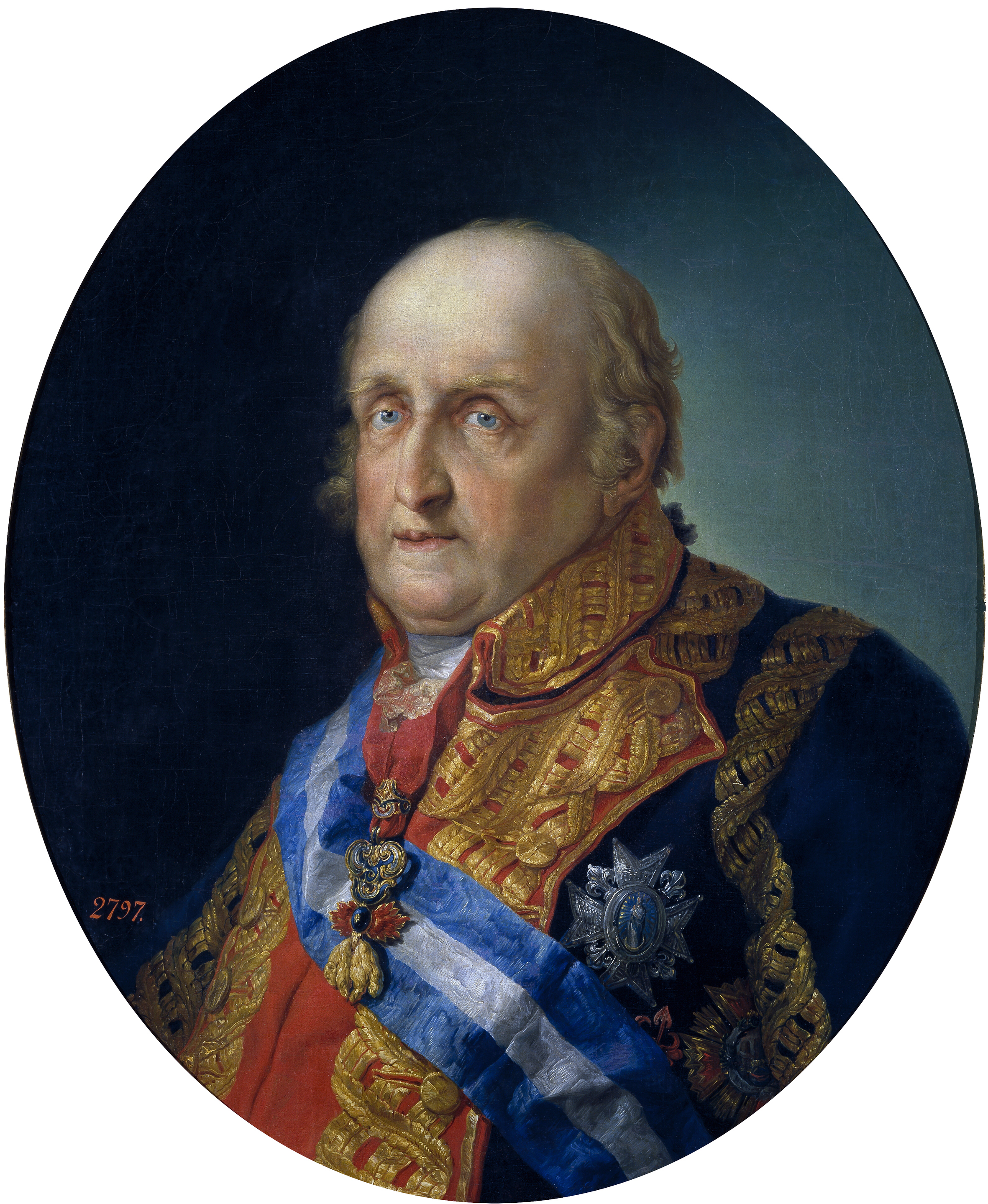
- Portrait by Vicente López y Portaña (Prado Museum)
- Born: 31 December 1755; Acquaviva Palace, Caserta, Naples
- Died: 20 April 1817 (aged 61); El Escorial, Spain
- Burial: El Escorial, Spain
- Spouse: Infanta María Amalia of Spain (m. 1795; died 1798)
Names
- Antonio Pascual Francisco Javier Juan Nepomuceno Aniello Raimundo Silvestre
- House: Bourbon
- Father: Charles III of Spain
- Mother: Maria Amalia of Saxony

Infante Antonio Pascual Francisco Javier Juan Nepomuceno Aniello Raimundo Silvestre of Spain (31 December 1755 – 20 April 1817) was the son of King Charles III of Spain and younger brother of King Charles IV of Spain and King Ferdinand I of the Two Sicilies.

== Biography ==
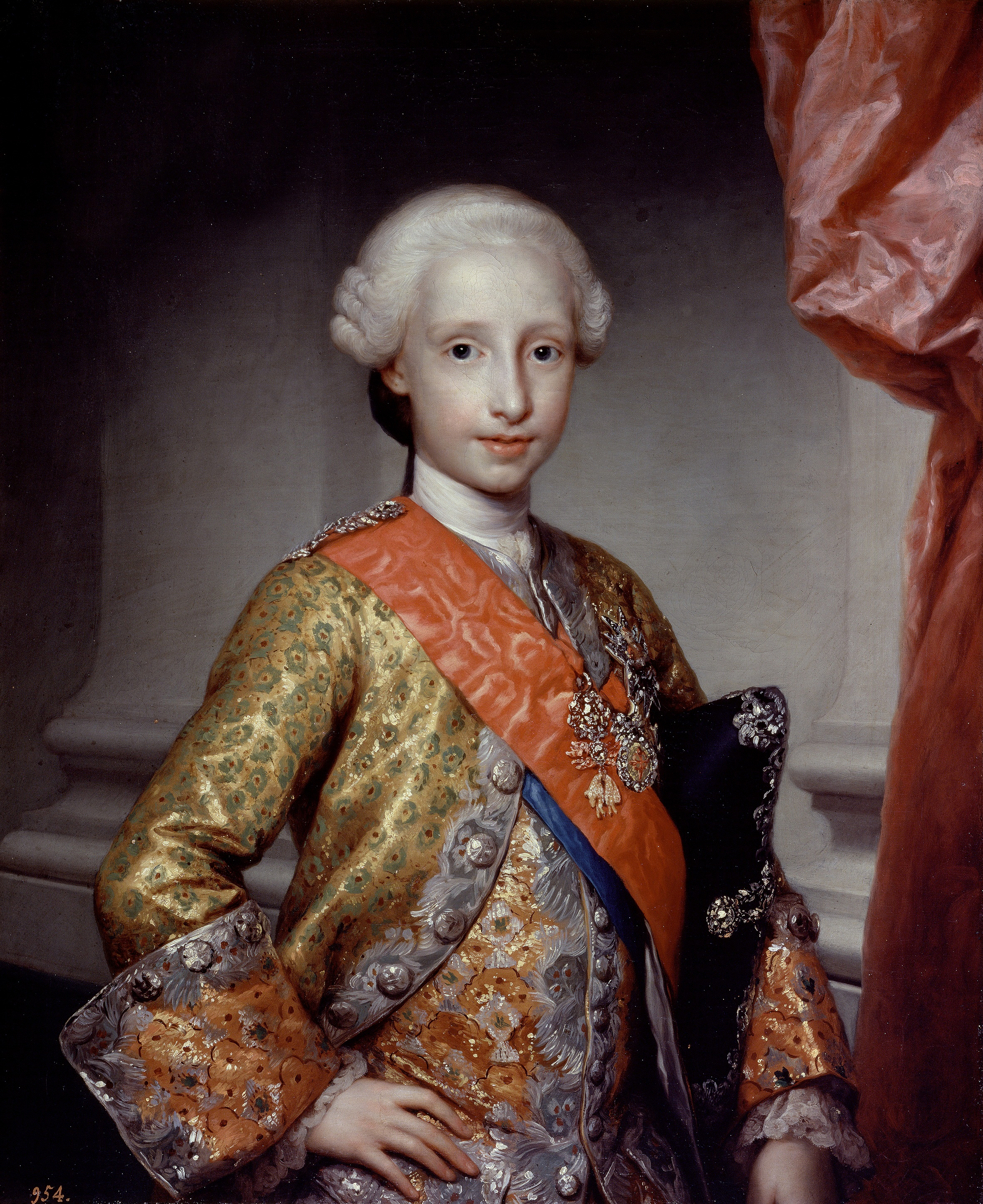
Portrait by Anton Raphael Mengs, 1767

Born in Acquaviva Palace in Caserta, where the royal family lived before the Royal Palace of Caserta was built, he was the fifth son of Charles III of Spain and Maria Amalia of Saxony. A humanist devoted to arts, he bore a striking resemblance to his elder brother Charles IV. At the death of his uncle Ferdinand VI of Spain, who he never met, his parents, brothers Charles and Gabriel, and sisters Maria Luisa and Maria Josefa departed for Spain where his father ruled as Charles III.

Aged 39, he married on August 25, 1795, María Amalia of Spain, 16-year-old daughter of his brother Charles IV in a double wedding where Maria Amalia's younger sister, Maria Luisa married Louis of Bourbon-Parma. She died 3 years later in childbirth after giving birth to a dead son.

He supported his nephew Prince Ferdinand, Prince of Asturias, and profoundly disliked Manuel Godoy.

He headed the Junta Suprema de Gobierno in 1808, in the absence of his brother and nephew, when they tried to humor Napoleon in Bayonne.

During the Peninsular War he lived with the rest of the Royal Family under house arrest at the Château de Valençay. After the war he served in several high functions. He was a fervent supporter of absolutism, organizing support for the restoration of the absolute monarchy.

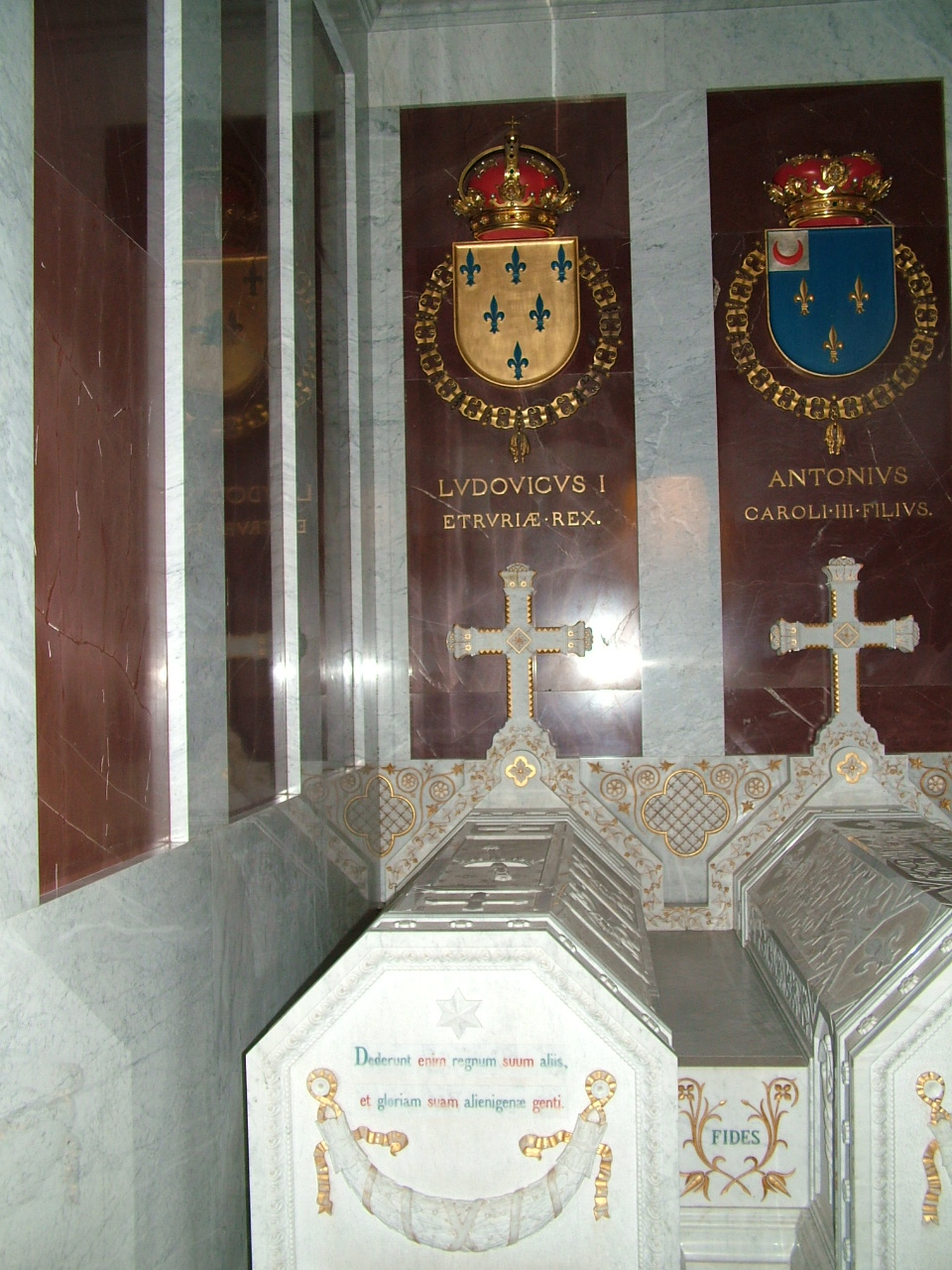
Tomb of Antonio in El Escorial (right), next to Louis I of Etruria.

== Arms ==
Heraldry of Infante Antonio Pascual of Spain

Coat of Arms of Infante Antonio of Spain

== Ancestry ==
Ancestors of Infante Antonio Pascual of Spain

8. Louis, Dauphin of France
4. Philip V of Spain
9. Maria Anna Victoria of Bavaria
2. Charles III of Spain
10. Odoardo Farnese, Hereditary Prince of Parma
5. Elisabeth Farnese
11. Dorothea Sophie of Neuburg
1. Infante Antonio Pascual of Spain
12. Augustus II of Poland
6. Augustus III of Poland
13. Christiane Eberhardine of Brandenburg-Bayreuth
3. Maria Amalia of Saxony
14. Joseph I, Holy Roman Emperor
7. Maria Josepha of Austria
15. Wilhelmine Amalie of Brunswick
