= Zenobia Revertera =

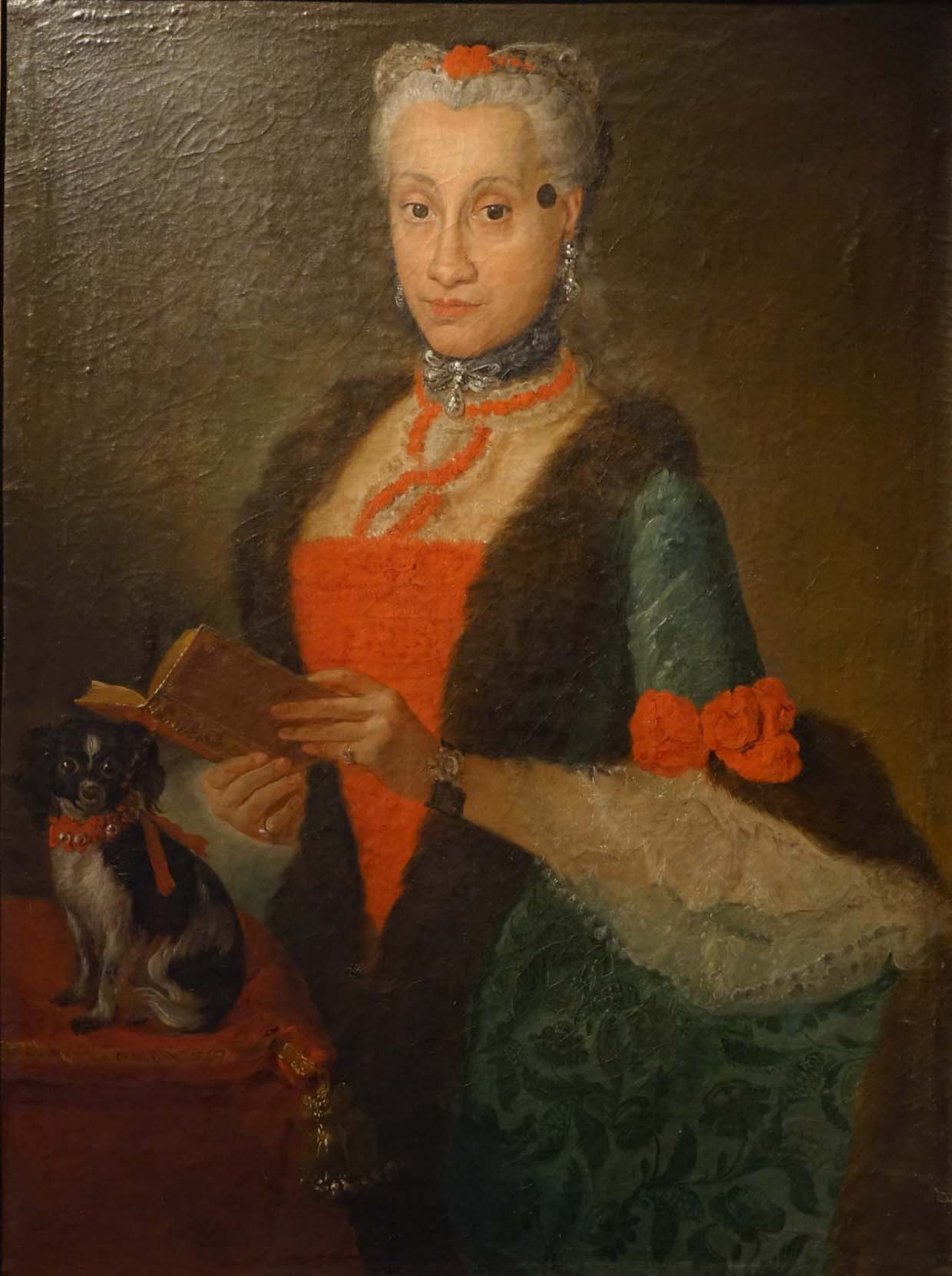
Zenobia Revertera, duchess di Castropignano by Francesco Liani

Zenobia Revertera, duchess di Castropignano (19 October 1712- 31 January 1779) was an Italian noble and courtier. She was an influential favorite of the queen of Naples, Maria Amalia of Saxony.

== Life ==
Zenobia Revertera was born to Nicola Ippolito, duke di Salandra, and Aurelia d'Evoli. In 1735, she married the official and military commander Francesco Eboli, Duke of Castropignano (1693–1758), who played an important role at court.

In 1738, Revertera was appointed to the court of the new queen consort, Maria Amalia of Saxony. She became a personal favorite of the queen, who in turn had great influence over the king, and reportedly used her influence over the queen on several occasions to benefit her spouse and herself financially, as well as the career of her spouse. In this, she became a leader of a faction at court and she and her spouse came in opposition to Bernardo Tanucci. She was described as greedy and ruthless, and her influence and position as the queen's favorite, which she shared with princess Anna Francesca Pinelli, was controversial and came to expose both herself and the queen to bad publicity.
