= Ferdinand Charles =

Ferdinand Charles may refer to:

- Ferdinand Charles, Archduke of Further Austria (1628–1662), ruler of Further Austria
- Ferdinand Charles, Duke of Mantua and Montferrat (1652–1708), ruler of the Duchy of Mantua
- Ferdinand Charles of Austria-Este (1754–1806), son of Empress Maria Theresa
- Archduke Ferdinand Karl Joseph of Austria-Este (1781–1850)
- Archduke Ferdinand Karl Viktor of Austria-Este (1821–1849)
- Ferdinand Charles of Bourbon-Parma (1823–1854), crown-prince of Lucca, later Duke Charles III of Parma
- Archduke Ferdinand Karl of Austria (1868–1915), son of Archduke Karl Ludwig of Austria
- Ferdinand Charles Stanley (1871–1935), son of Frederick Stanley, 16th Earl of Derby
- Ferdinand Charles, comte d'Aspremont-Lynden (1689–1772), soldier

== See also ==
- Charles Ferdinand, Duke of Berry (1778–1820), son of Charles X of France
