= Francesco Eboli, Duke of Castropignano =

Italian nobleman, soldier, diplomat and politician

Francesco Eboli (or Evoli) (Castropignano, 24 February 1693 – Naples, 20 January 1758) was an Italian nobleman, soldier, diplomat and politician, and II Duke of Castropignano.
He was lieutenant of the cavalry of the Kingdom of Naples in the battle of Bitonto on 24 May 1734, commander of the Neapolitan militias that occupied Pescara, wresting it from the Austrians in July 1734, and commander of the Neapolitan army in the Battle of Velletri on 10 August 1744.

== Biography ==
He was the eldest son of Domenico d'Evoli (1648–1723), First Duke of Castropignano, and Concetta Caracciolo. During the War of the Spanish Succession he sided with the Bourbons, placing himself at the service of Philip V, the new King of Spain. When the Kingdom of Naples was lost to the Habsburgs in 1707, he also lost the hereditary rights to his father's fiefdom, obtaining its restitution only following the Treaty of Vienna in 1725, which, by establishing peace between Philip V and the Emperor Charles VI, reinstated the nobles of the Bourbon party in their possessions.

In 1727, he was awarded the Order of the Golden Fleece.

In 1733, with the rank of Lieutenant General, he participated, under the command of the Count of Montemar, in the reconquest of the Two Sicilies for the Infante Charles of Bourbon, Duke of Parma during the Polish War of Succession. He commanded the Spanish troops in their first action of the conflict, conquering the fortress of Aulla in Lunigiana, Tuscany on 24 December. The conquest was celebrated by the poet of the court of Parma, Carlo Innocenzo Frugoni, who composed a sonnet dedicated to the Duke for the occasion.

After distinguishing himself in the Battle of Bitonto, he occupied the fortress of Pescara, where the Austrian troops retreating from Bari had barricaded themselves. For these services, he was awarded the title of Grandee of Spain in 1737.

After having tried in vain to become Viceroy of Sicily, in 1739, he was appointed Neapolitan Ambassador to Paris. In 1741, at the outbreak of the War of the Austrian Succession, he was recalled to his homeland to take command, alongside the Duke of Montemar, of operations in Lombardy against the Austro-Sardinian army. In August 1742, however, he was forced to retreat after Great Britain, an ally of Austria, had threatened Naples with a naval bombardment.

In 1744, under the command of the King, he participated in the victorious Battle of Velletri against the advancing Austrians, averting the risk that the Habsburgs could regain possession of the Kingdom of Naples. After this battle, he became responsible for the defence of the Kingdom of Naples, but he remained inactive for the rest of the war, as the Kingdom wasn't attacked again.

In 1735, he had married Zenobia Revertera, who became a personal favorite of Queen Maria Amalia of Saxony and very influential in Spanish politics. Francesco Eboli and his wife became the leaders of a pro-French faction at the Neapolitan court in opposition to Bernardo Tanucci, the de facto Prime Minister. In October 1754, his closest two employees were accused of embezzlement. Although Eboli was not directly charged, he appeared discredited in the eyes of the public opinion.

Eboli died on 20 January 1758, and was succeeded by his only son Mariano (born 1742), who inherited the fiefdom of Castropignano and the title of Duke. Eboli also had a daughter, Maria Giovanna, who married the III prince of Ardore.

== Sources ==
- Michelangelo Schipa, Il Regno di Napoli al tempo di Carlo di Borbone, Napoli, 1904
