= Maria Amalia of Saxony =

Queen of Spain from 1759 to 1760

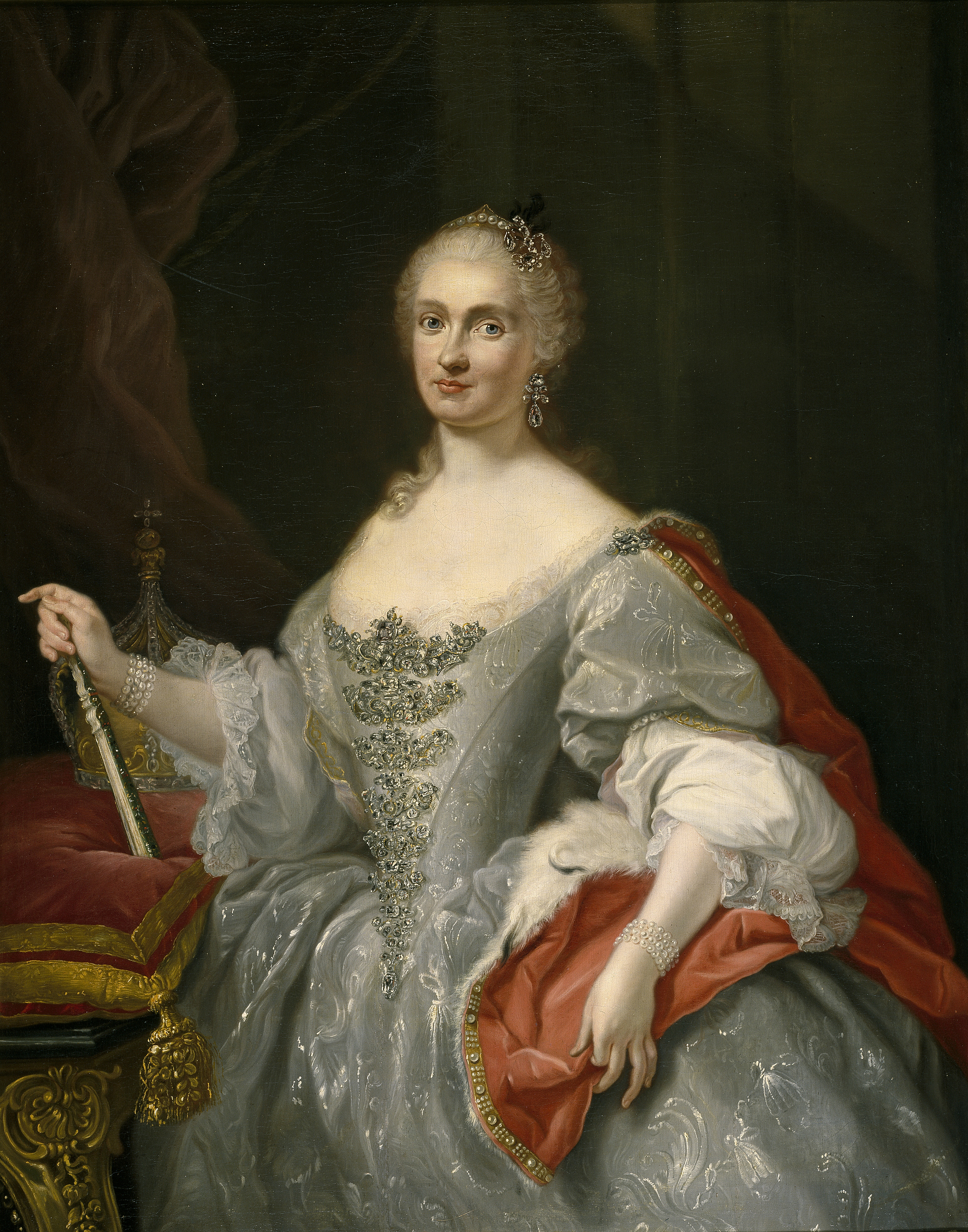
- Maria Amalia overlooking the Neapolitan crown, by Giuseppe Bonito, c. 1745

Queen consort of Spain
- Tenure: 10 August 1759 – 27 September 1760

Queen consort of Naples and Sicily
- Tenure: 19 June 1738 – 10 August 1759
- Born: 24 November 1724; Dresden Castle, Dresden, Saxony
- Died: 27 September 1760 (aged 35); Buen Retiro Palace, Madrid, Spain
- Burial: El Escorial, Spain
- Spouse: Charles III of Spain (m. 1738)
- Issue Detail: Princess Maria Isabel; Infanta María Josefa; María Luisa, Holy Roman Empress; Infante Philip, Duke of Calabria; Charles IV, King of Spain; Ferdinand I, King of the Two Sicilies; Infante Gabriel; Infante Antonio Pascual; Infante Francisco Javier
Names
- German: Maria Amalia Christina Franziska Xaveria Flora Walburga; Spanish: María Amalia Cristina Francisca Javiera Flora Walburga; Polish: Maria Amalia Franciszka Krystyna Wettyn
- House: Wettin
- Father: Augustus III of Poland
- Mother: Maria Josepha of Austria

Maria Amalia of Saxony (Maria Amalia Christina Franziska Xaveria Flora Walburga; 24 November 1724 – 27 September 1760) was Queen of Spain from 10 August 1759 until her death in 1760 as the wife of King Charles III. Previously, she had been Queen of Naples and Sicily since marrying Charles on 19 June 1738. She was born a princess of Poland and Saxony, daughter of King Augustus III of Poland and Princess Maria Josepha of Austria. Maria Amalia and Charles had thirteen children, of whom seven survived into adulthood. A popular consort, Maria Amalia oversaw the construction of the Caserta Palace outside Naples as well as various other projects, and she is known for her influence upon the affairs of state.

== Biography ==
=== Early years ===
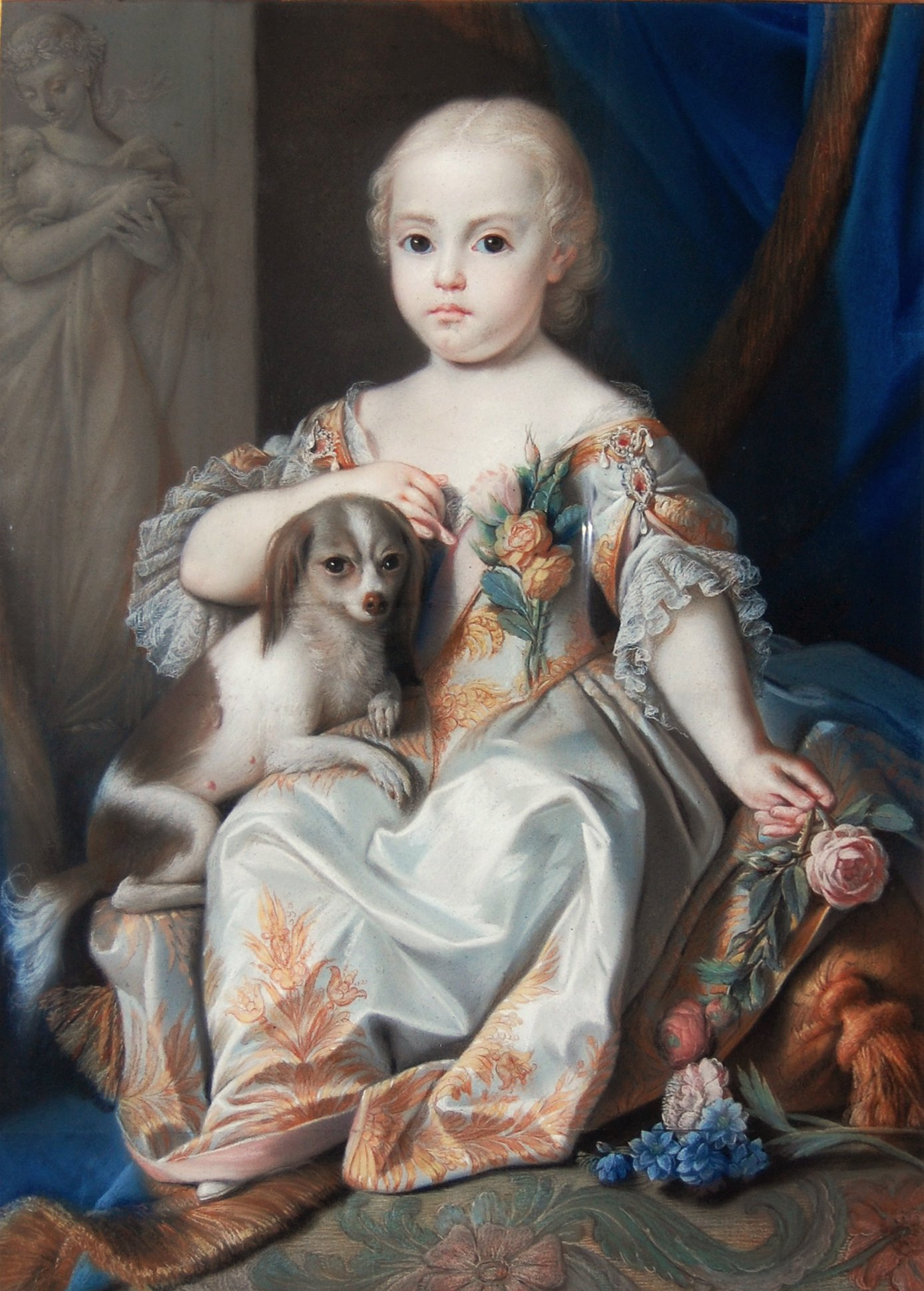
Maria Amalia as a child, by Marie-Catherine Silvestre

She was born at Dresden Castle in Dresden, the daughter of Augustus III of Poland, Elector of Saxony and Maria Josepha of Austria, herself daughter of Joseph I, Holy Roman Emperor. Her mother was the first cousin of Empress Maria Theresa. The infant was baptized with the names Maria Amalia Christina Franziska Xaveria Flora Walburga, but known as Maria Amalia. One of sixteen children, she was the sister of Frederick Christian, Elector of Saxony, Maria Anna Sophia of Saxony wife of her cousin Maximilian III Joseph, Elector of Bavaria; she was the older sister of Princess Maria Josepha of Saxony who was the mother of Louis XVI of France. Her youngest sister, Princess Kunigunde was a possible wife for the future Philippe Égalité. She grew up at the court of Dresden and was educated in French, dance and painting. She was also an accomplished musician and sang and played the piano from an early age.

=== Queen of Naples and Sicily ===
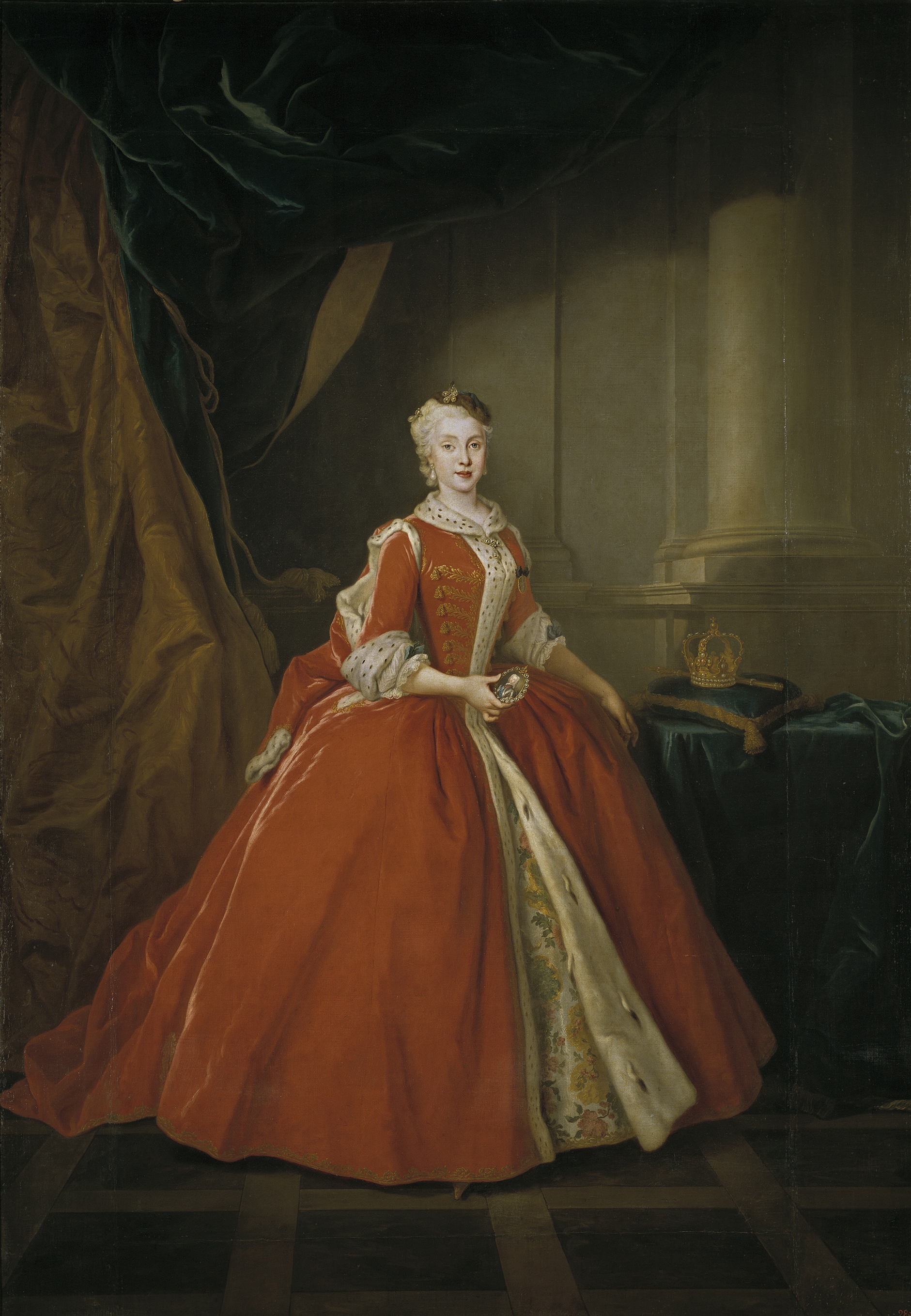
Maria Amalia of Saxony depicted in 1738 in Polish attire by Louis de Silvestre, Museo del Prado

In 1738, Maria Amalia became engaged to Charles, King of Naples and Sicily, the future Charles III of Spain. The marriage was arranged by her future mother-in-law Elizabeth Farnese, after Elizabeth had failed to arrange a marriage of Charles to Archduchess Maria Anna of Austria, and refused to agree to have him marry to Louise Élisabeth of France. The impenetrable secret negotiations had taken place earlier in Vienna, where the Dowager Empress Wilhelmina Amalia, grandmother of Maria Amalia, played an important part in the negotiations. The Spanish ambassador in Vienna, Count Fuenclara, acted on behalf of the courts of Madrid and Naples, while the Italian banker Giovanni Battista Bolza represented the interests of Dresden court. In December 1737, a papal dispensation was made, and the marriage announced in the beginning 1738. On 8 May 1738, Maria Amalia had a proxy ceremony at Dresden with her brother, Frederick Christian of Saxony, representing Charles. Since this marriage was looked upon favorably by the papacy, it soothed the diplomatic disagreements between Charles and the Papal states.

On 4 July 1738, Maria Amalia arrived at Naples and to what was described as a euphoric welcome. The couple met for the first time on 19 June 1738 at Portella, a village on the kingdom's frontier near Fondi. At court, festivities lasted till 3 July when Charles created the Royal order of San Gennaro – the most prestigious chivalric order in the kingdom. He later had the Order of Charles III created in Spain on 19 September 1771.

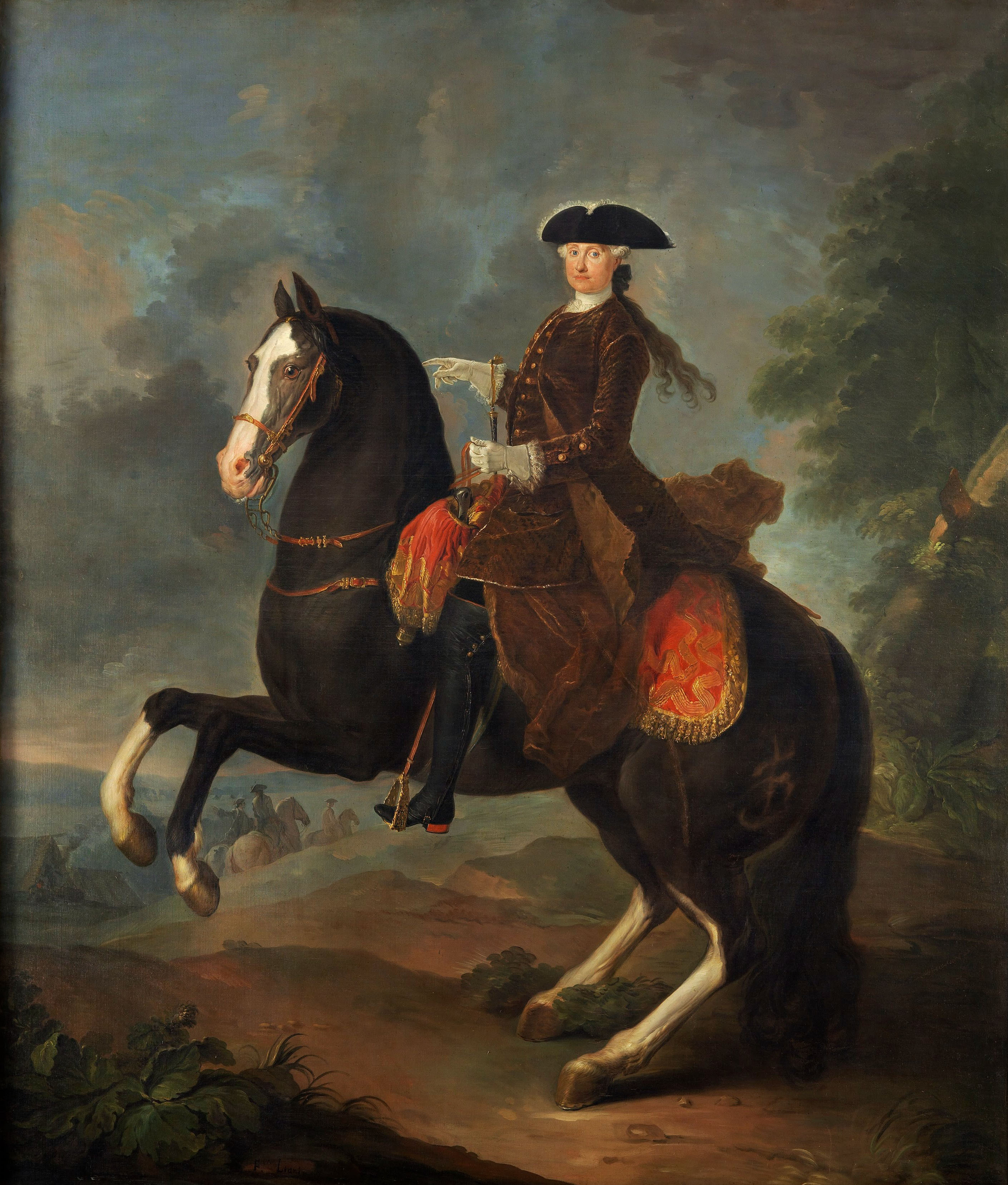
Equestrian Portrait of Queen Maria Amalia by Francesco Liani

Despite being an arranged marriage, the couple became very close: it was noted and reported to her mother-in-law in Spain, that Charles seemed happy and pleased when he first met her. Maria Amalia was described as a beauty and as a skillful rider, and she accompanied Charles on his hunts. As Queen, she exerted great influence upon politics despite her frequent illnesses, and she actively participated in state affairs. She ended the careers of several politicians she disliked, such as J.M. de Benavides y Aragón, conte di Santisteban; Y.Y. de Montealegre, marchese di Salas; and G. Fogliani Sforza d'Aragona, marchese di Pellegrino. Her displeasure led directly to the latter being deposed as prime minister. Maria Amalia did not need to keep her influence secret: after the birth of her first son in 1747, she was given a seat in the council of state. She worked against the Spanish influence on Naples and in 1742 convinced Charles, against the will of Spain, to declare Naples neutral during the War of the Austrian Succession, during which Britain threatened to bomb Naples. In 1744, however she was forced to agree to declare war. She then favored Great Britain before France and Austria. Maria Amalia was talked about because of her favorites, which were to have influence over her policy when she was very ill, such as princess Anna Francesca Pinelli and duchess Zenobia Revertera. In 1754, she supported the career of Bernardo Tanucci as Foreign Minister.

Maria Amalia was very cultivated and played an important role in the construction of Caserta Palace, for which she saw her husband lay the foundation stone for on his 36th birthday, on 20 January 1752 amid much festivity. However, they left Naples before its completion due to her declining health so they never actually lived in the palace. She also was influential in the building of the Palace of Portici (Reggia di Portici), the Teatro di San Carlo – constructed in just 270 days – the Palace of Capodimonte (Reggia di Capodimonte); her husband also had the Royal Palace of Naples renovated. Her apartments at Portici were home to the famous porcelain from the Capodimonte Porcelain Manufactory which she who introduced the production of Porcelain in Naples in 1743. She was also a heavy user of tobacco. Maria Amalia was also a patron of the composer Gian Francesco Fortunati, a favorite at the Neapolitan court. She was criticized for being too religious from what was proper from someone not a member of a Catholic monastic order: she attended mass twice and eventually four times a day and kept more devotions than what was normal for a nun or a monk, and he eventually lectured her that she was more fervent than what could be regarded as modest for a lay person.

=== Queen of Spain ===
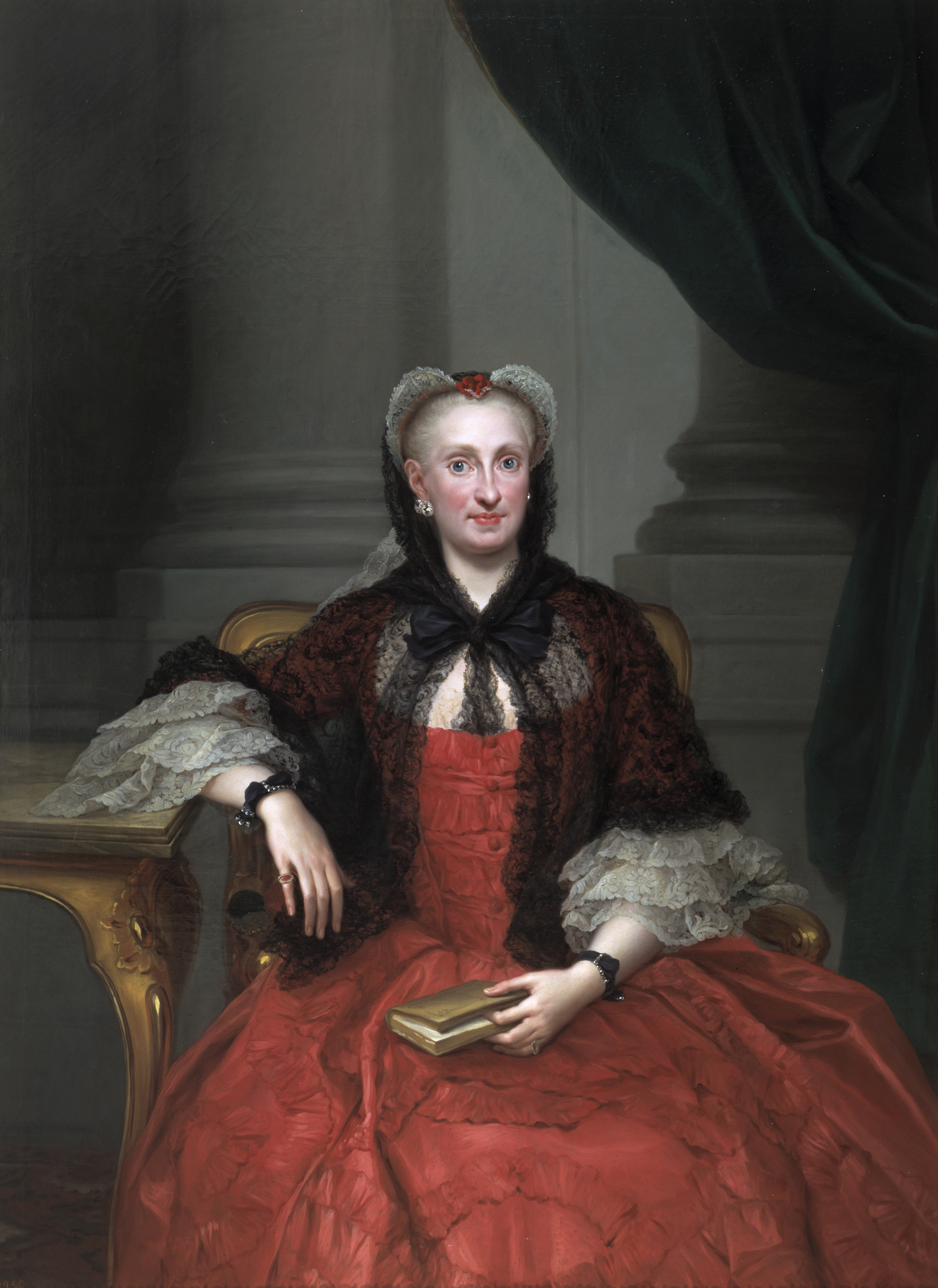
Posthumous portrait of Queen Maria Amelia by Anton Raphael Mengs, c. 1761

At the end of 1758, Charles' half brother Ferdinand, was displaying the same symptoms of depression from which their father used to suffer. Ferdinand lost his devoted wife, Infanta Barbara of Portugal in August 1758 and would fall into deep mourning for her. He named Charles his heir on 10 December 1758 before leaving Madrid to stay at Villaviciosa de Odón where he died on 10 August 1759. Charles succeeded him.

That same year Charles and Maria Amalia left Naples for Madrid, leaving two of their children behind in Caserta. Her third-surviving son became Ferdinand I of the Two Sicilies, while his elder brother Charles was groomed in Spain to inherit the Spanish crown; their oldest brother, Infante Felipe, Duke of Calabria was mentally disabled and was thus taken out of the line of succession to any throne; he died quietly and forgotten in Portici where he had been born in 1747. The right of succession to Naples and Sicily was reserved for her third son Prince Ferdinand of Naples and Sicily; Prince Ferdinand stayed in Italy while his parents were in Spain. In favour of that, Charles abdicated on 6 October 1759, decreeing the final separation between the Spanish and Neapolitan crowns. Charles and Maria Amalia arrived in Barcelona on 7 October 1759.

Maria Amalia once again did much to improve the royal residences having them redecorated. She, along with her husband, helped with the founding of the luxury porcelain factory under the name Real Fábrica del Buen Retiro. Maria Amalia deemed Spain to be ill managed and undeveloped, and she partially blamed her mother-in-law, Queen Dowager Elizabeth Farnese, who was thereby obliged to leave the Spanish court. She did not like it in Spain, and complained about the food, the language, which she refused to learn; the climate, the Spaniards, whom she thought to be passive and the Spanish courtiers, whom she regarded as ignorant and uneducated. She described the Spanish court as depressed and hysterical. She planned great reforms to the Spanish system, but did not have time to finish them. In September 1760, a year after arriving in Madrid, Maria Amalia suddenly died at the Buen Retiro Palace outside the capital. She was buried at the Royal Crypt in El Escorial. She was joined by her devoted husband in 1788.

In 1761, Charles commissioned Giovanni Battista Tiepolo to paint frescoes for the Royal Palace in Madrid. In the Queen's Antechamber, Tiepolo and his assistants painted the Apotheosis of the Spanish Monarchy. The frescos were painted from 1762–1766. Queen Maria Amalia appears surrounded by several of the gods of Greek mythology, including Apollo.

== Issue ==
By Infante Carlos of Spain, Duke of Parma and Piacenza; King of Naples and Sicily; King of Spain (Real Alcázar de Madrid, Madrid, Kingdom of Spain, 20 January 1716 – Royal Palace of Madrid, Madrid, Kingdom of Spain, 14 December 1788)

1. Princess Maria Isabel (Portici, 6 September 1740 – Naples, 2 November 1742) died in childhood.
2. Princess Maria Josefa (Portici, 20 January 1742 – Naples, 1 April 1742) died in childhood.
3. Princess María Isabel Ana (Capodimonte, 30 April 1743 – Capodimonte, 5 March 1749) died in childhood.
4. Princess María Josefa (Gaeta, 6 July 1744 – Madrid, 8 December 1801).
5. Princess Maria Luisa (Portici, 24 November 1745 – The Hofburg, 15 May 1792) married Leopold II, Holy Roman Emperor and had issue.
6. Prince Felipe, Duke of Calabria (Portici, 13 June 1747 – Portici, 19 September 1777).
7. Charles IV of Spain (Portici, 11 November 1748 – Palazzo Barberini, 19 January 1819) married Maria Luisa of Parma and had issue.
8. Princess Maria Teresa (Royal Palace of Naples, 2 December 1749 – Portici, 2 May 1750) died in childhood.
9. Ferdinand I of the Two Sicilies (Naples, 12 January 1751 – Naples, 4 January 1825) married Maria Carolina of Austria and had issue
10. Prince Gabriel (Portici, 11 May 1752 – Casita del Infante, 23 November 1788). married Infanta Maria Ana Vitória of Portugal
11. Princess Maria Ana (Portici, 3 July 1754 – Capodimonte, 11 May 1755) died in childhood.
12. Prince Antonio Pascual (Caserta, 31 December 1755 – 20 April 1817) married Infanta María Amalia of Spain
13. Prince Francisco Javier (Caserta, 15 February 1757 – Aranjuez, 10 April 1771) died in childhood.

== Arms ==
Coat of Arms of Queen Maria Amalia of Naples and Sicily, Princess of Saxony
(1738–1759)

Coat of Arms of Queen Maria Amalia of Spain, Princess of Saxony (1759–1760)

== Ancestry ==
Ancestors of Maria Amalia of Saxony

8. John George III, Elector of Saxony
4. Augustus II of Poland
9. Anna Sophie of Denmark
2. Augustus III of Poland
10. Christian Ernst, Margrave of Brandenburg-Bayreuth
5. Christiane Eberhardine of Bayreuth
11. Sophie Louise of Württemberg
1. Maria Amalia of Saxony
12. Leopold I, Holy Roman Emperor
6. Joseph I, Holy Roman Emperor
13. Eleonore Magdalene of Neuburg
3. Maria Josepha of Austria
14. John Frederick, Duke of Brunswick
7. Wilhelmine Amalie of Brunswick
15. Benedicta Henrietta of the Palatinate

Maria Amalia of Saxony House of Wettin Born: 24 November 1724 Died: 27 September 1760
Royal titles
Vacant Title last held by Elisabeth Christine of Brunswick-Wolfenbüttel	Queen consort of Naples and Sicily; 1738–1759	Vacant Title next held by Maria Carolina of Austria
Vacant Title last held by Barbara of Portugal	Queen consort of Spain; 1759–1760	Vacant Title next held by Maria Luisa of Parma
