= Ferdinand Charles, comte d'Aspremont-Lynden =

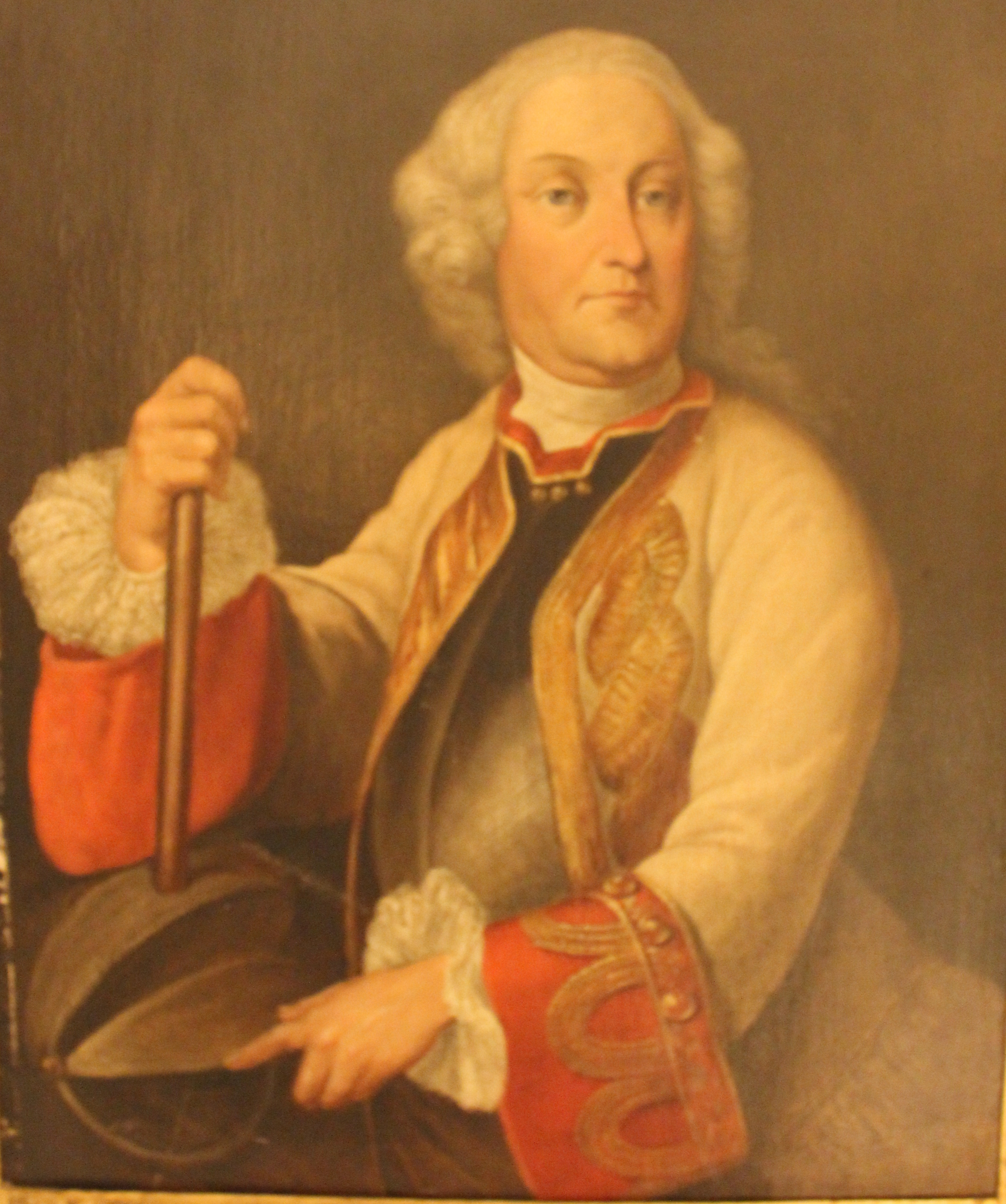

Ferdinand Charles Gobert, Graf von Aspremont-Lynden-Reckheim (1689–1772), was a soldier, who served in the Low Countries for the Habsburgs.

== Early life ==
Count Ferdinand Charles Gobert of Aspremont-Lynden-Reckheim was born in Froidcourt Castle, as the youngest son of Count Ferdinand Gobert of Aspremont-Lynden-Reckheim and his second wife, Princess Julianna Barbara Rákóczi, daughter of Francis II Rákóczi, Prince of Transylvania.

== Career ==
He served the Dutch Republic in the War of Spanish Succession as lieutenant between 1708 and 1714. During this war, he met Prince Eugene of Savoy, and entered in his service in the Imperial Army in 1722.

He fought the French on the Rhine and Moselle between 1733 and 1734, and the Turks between 1737 and 1738. In 1741, he became Feldmarschalleutnant.

During the War of the Austrian Succession in 1743, he was Commandander-in-Chief of the Imperial and Piedmontese armies in Italy. He covered himself in glory, defeating the Franco-Spanish army in the Battle of Campo Santo. He distinguished himself again in the Battle of Velletri (1744) and Battle of Piacenza in 1746.

In 1754, he became Field Marshal, and was also member of the War Council. In 1763, he was made a Knight in the Order of the Golden Fleece.

== Personal life ==
On 2 January 1730 in Vienna he married Countess Maria Theresia Esterhazy von Galantha (1697–1746), a daughter of Prince Michael Esterhazy von Galantha (1671–1721) and his wife, Donna Anna Margherita Tizzone Biandrata (1673–1755). His wife died, without issue, on 2 December 1750.

After the death of his first wife in 1850, he married Countess Maria Johanna Barbara von Nostitz-Rokitnitz (1723–1779), widow of Count Karl Joseph Leopold von Lichnowsky-Woschütz (1702–1739), daughter of Count Johann Karl Martin Christoph von Nostitz-Rokitnitz (1673–1740) and his wife, Countess Maria Maximiliane von Sinzendorf (1675–1718).

He had no issue from both marriages.

== See also ==
- Castle of Aspremont-Lynden

== Sources ==
- Charles-Alexandre de Lorraine. L'homme, le maréchal, le grand maître, notice by Georges Englebert, ed. Luc Derloo, Brussels, Générale de Banque, 1987, pp. 174–175
