= Infanta María Amalia of Spain =

Infanta of Spain (1779–1798)

Infanta María Amalia
- Infanta of Spain
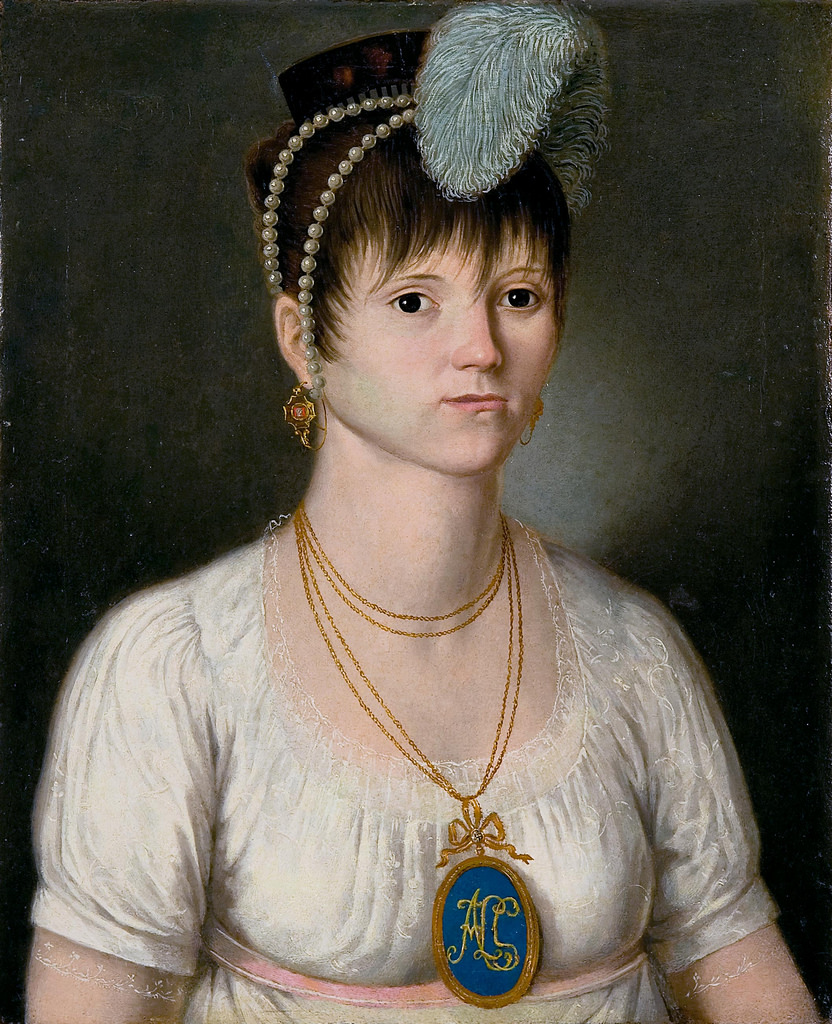
- The Infanta María Amalia by an unknown artist.
- Born: 9 January 1779; Royal Palace, El Pardo, Madrid, Spain
- Died: 22 July 1798 (aged 19); Royal Palace, Madrid, Spain
- Burial: El Escorial, Madrid, Spain
- Spouse: Infante Antonio Pascual of Spain (m. 1795)
Names
- María Amalia de Borbón y Borbón-Parma
- House: Bourbon (by birth and marriage)
- Father: Charles IV of Spain
- Mother: Maria Luisa of Parma

María Amalia, Infanta of Spain (9 January 1779 in Madrid – 22 July 1798 in Madrid), was a Spanish princess, daughter of King Charles IV of Spain. In 1795, she married her uncle Infante Antonio Pascual of Spain.

== Early life ==
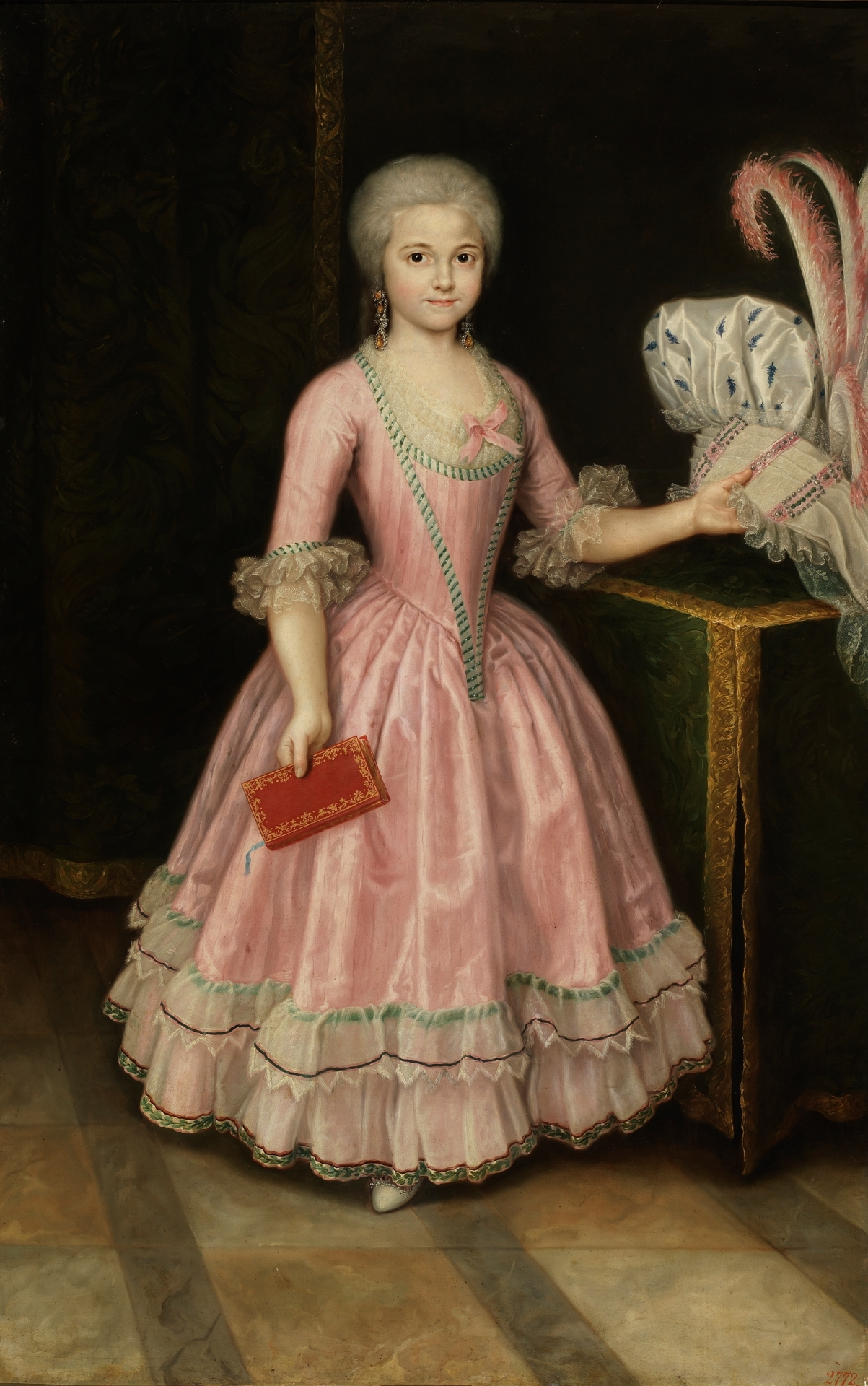
Infanta María Amalia in 1791, by Ramón Bayeu.

Born at the Royal Palace of El Pardo, Maria Amalia was the second surviving daughter of King Carlos IV of Spain (1748–1819) and his wife Maria Luisa of Parma (1751–1819), a granddaughter of Louis XV of France.

Maria Amalia's mother, Queen Maria Luisa, arranged her marriage to her maternal first cousin Louis, hereditary Prince of Parma. The Prince arrived at the Spanish court, in 1794, to finish his education. He was blond, good looking, of amiable character and he had a great interest in science. Five years younger than her cousin, Infanta Maria Amalia was fifteen years old at the time. She was short, not particularly attractive and sullen, reserved and shy in character. Louis, who was equally shy, preferred her younger sister, Infanta Maria Luisa, who although only twelve, was of a more cheerful disposition and somewhat better looking. Maria Amalia's parents accepted the unexpected change of brides, but it became a matter of urgency for them to find a husband for the saddened and scorned Maria Amalia. As she was the elder of the two sisters, it would be humiliating for Maria Amalia that her younger sister not only would marry her previous fiance, but that Maria Luisa would marry first.

== Marriage and death ==
To find a new groom for Maria Amalia of a royal rank in such a short period of time was not an easy affair; thus her parents decided to marry Maria Amalia to her uncle, Antonio Pascual, Infante of Spain, who was 24 years older than she was. Infante Antônio was 39 years old. Considered of very limited intelligence, his interests were gardening, agriculture and hunting. He had remained unmarried without responsibilities of any kind.

Maria Amalia married her uncle on 25 August 1795 at the Royal Palace of La Granja. It was a double wedding; at the same time, her sister, 13-year-old Maria Luisa, married Luis, Prince of Parma, Maria Amalia's original intended groom. The two couples continued living at the Spanish royal court.

During the fall 1797, Maria Amalia became pregnant with her first child. On 20 July 1798, she went into labour. The delivery was complicated. The baby got stuck by the shoulders in the birth canal and the doctors were unable to extract him. After two days, the surgeon finally intervened. By then the baby, a boy, was stillborn. While her son was buried at El Escorial, Maria Amalia suffered in agony. She had contracted an infection during the ordeal and died on 22 July. She was only 19 years old.

== Ancestry ==
Ancestors of Infanta María Amalia of Spain

8. Philip V of Spain
4. Charles III of Spain
9. Elisabeth Farnese
2. Charles IV of Spain
10. Augustus III of Poland
5. Maria Amalia of Saxony
11. Maria Josepha of Austria
1. Infanta María Amalia of Spain
12. Philip V of Spain (= 8)
6. Philip, Duke of Parma
13. Elisabeth Farnese (= 9)
3. Maria Luisa of Parma
14. Louis XV of France
7. Louise-Élisabeth of France
15. Marie Leszczyńska
