= Equestrian Portrait of Charles of Bourbon =

Painting by Francesco Liani in the National Museum of Capodimonte, Naples

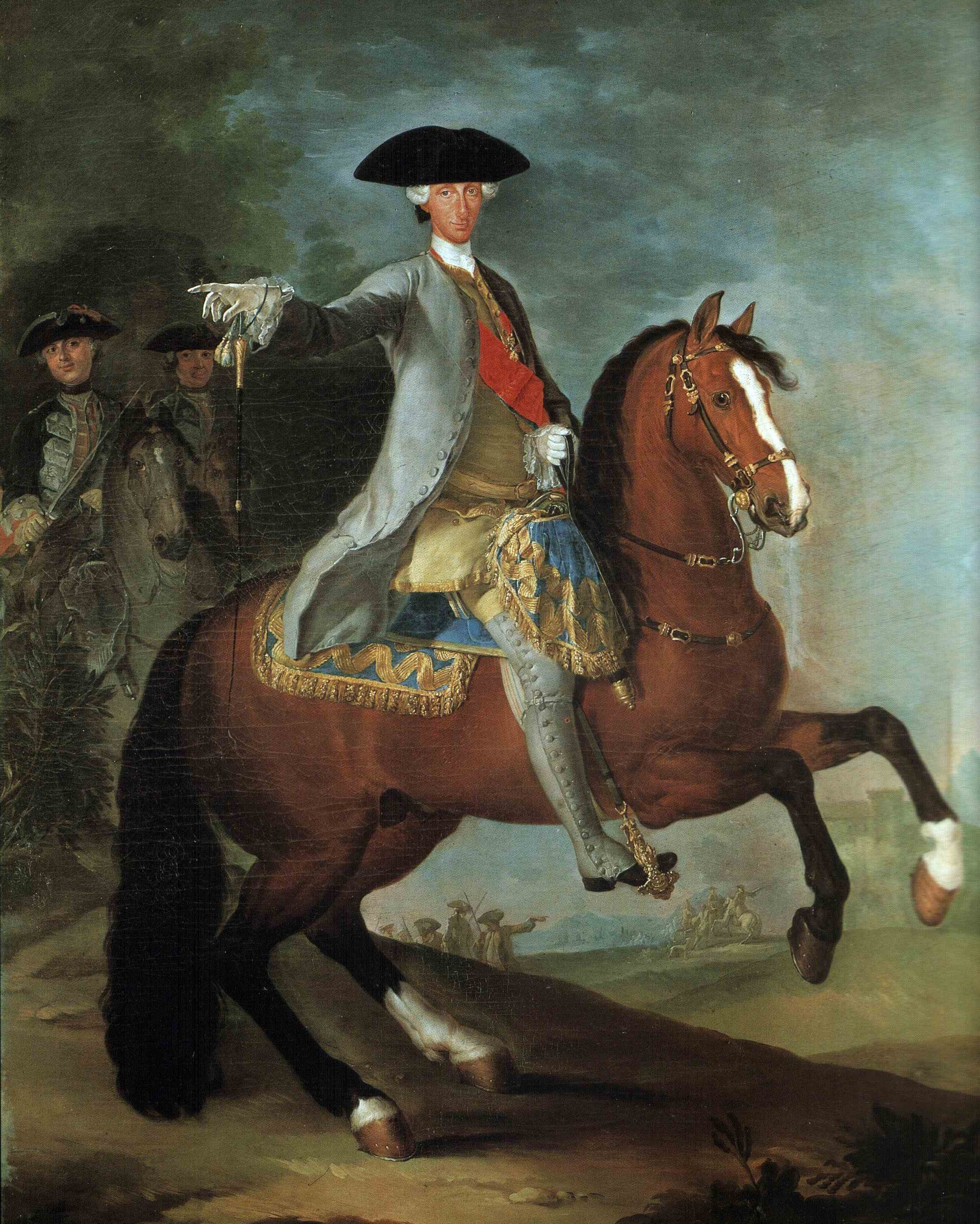

Equestrian Portrait of Charles of Bourbon is a mid-18th century oil on canvas portrait of Charles of Bourbon, produced by Francesco Liani towards the end of Charles' rule in Naples before becoming Charles III of Spain. Liani also produced a portrait of Charles' wife, Maria Amalia of Saxony. Both works are now in Room 34 of the National Museum of Capodimonte.
