= Equestrian Portrait of Maria Amalia of Saxony =

Painting by Francesco Liani in the National Museum of Capodimonte, Naples

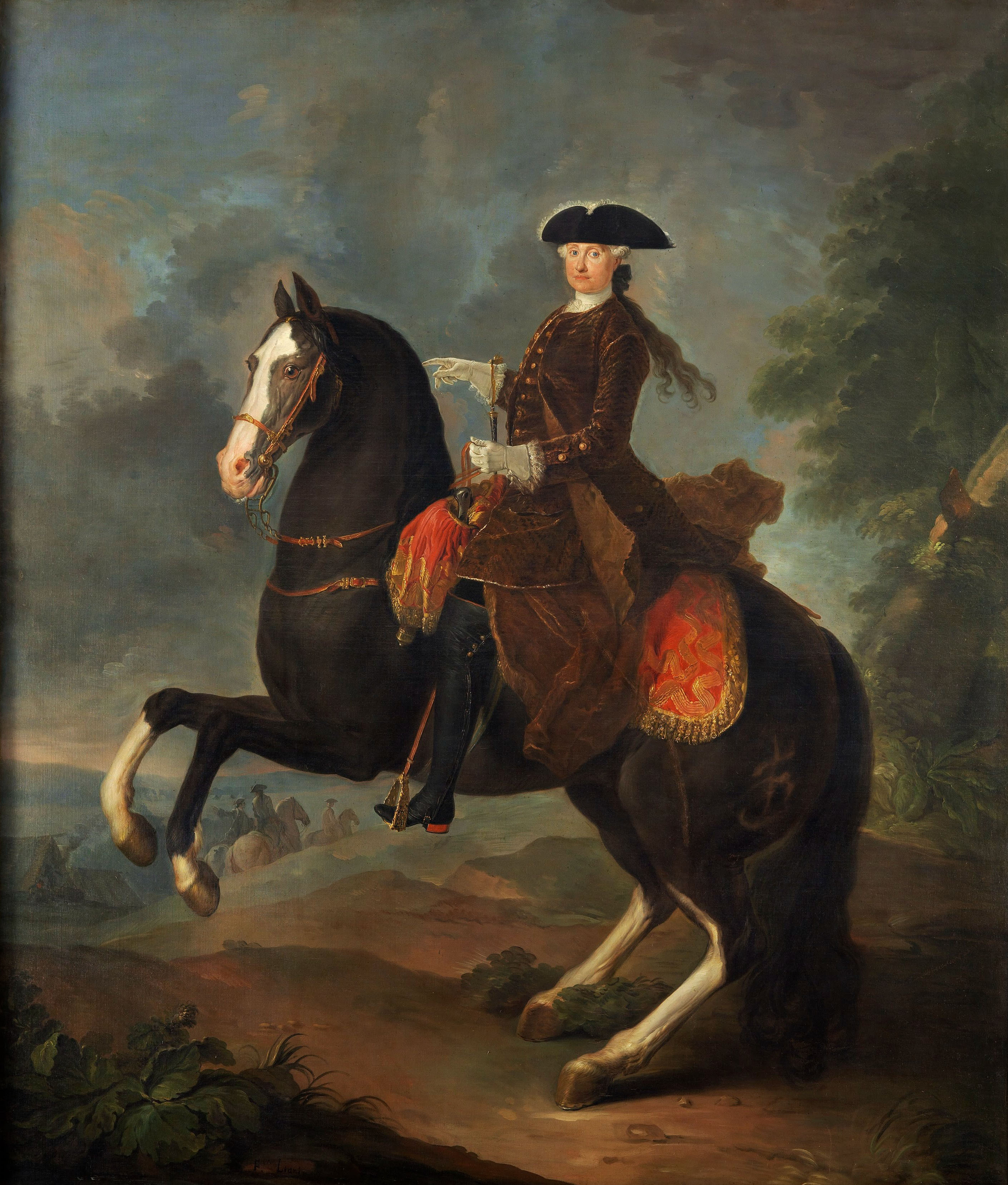

Equestrian Portrait of Amalia of Saxony is a mid-18th century portrait of Maria Amalia of Saxony, produced by Francesco Liani towards the end of her and her husband's rule in Naples before he became Charles III of Spain. It shows its subject in male hunting dress and is modelled on Louis Silvestre II's portrait of Maria's father Augustus III of Poland. Liani also produced a pair of her husband - both works are now in Room 34 of the National Museum of Capodimonte in Naples.
