= Infanta María Josefa of Spain =

Spanish infanta

Infanta María Josefa
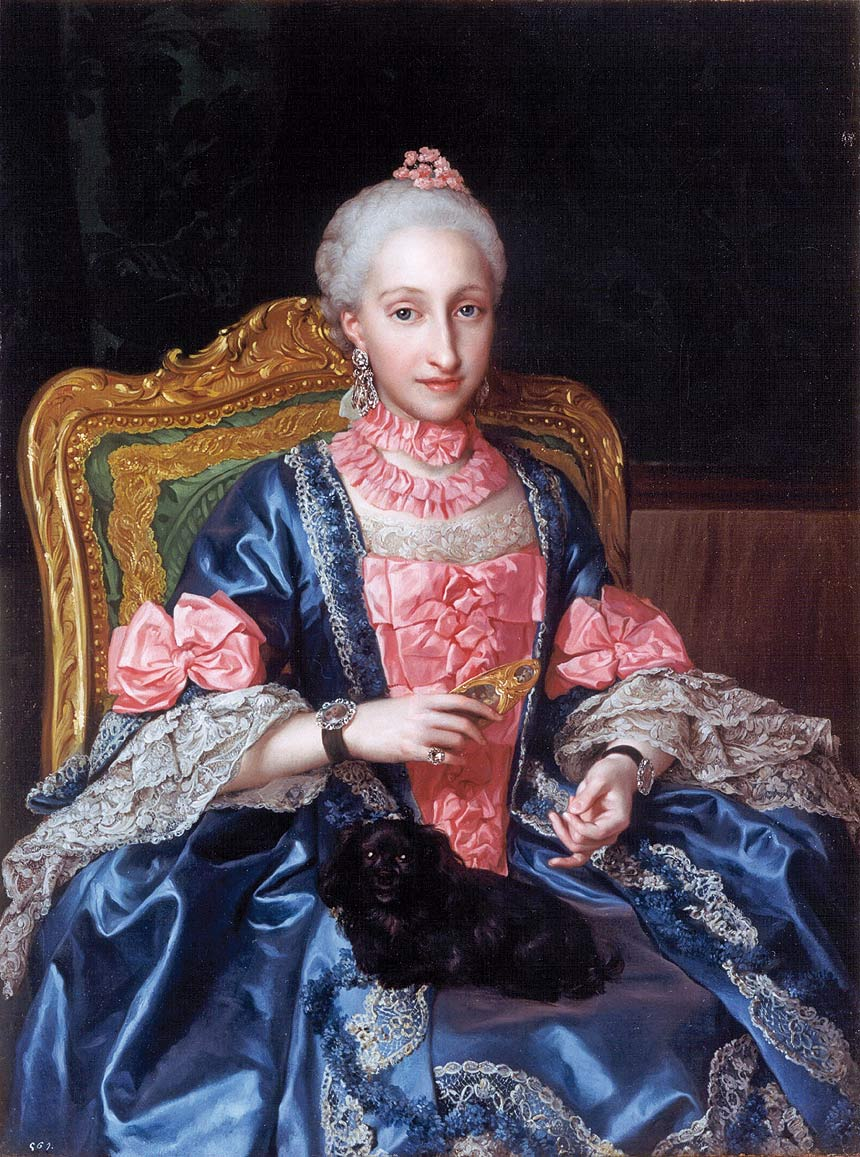
- Portrait by Anton Raphael Mengs (1761–9)
- Born: 6 July 1744; Gaeta, Kingdom of Naples (now Italy)
- Died: 8 December 1801 (aged 57); Royal Palace of Madrid, Madrid, Spain
- Burial: El Escorial, Spain
Names
- María Josefa Carmela de Borbón y Sajonia
- House: Bourbon
- Father: Charles III of Spain
- Mother: Maria Amalia of Saxony

Infanta María Josefa of Spain (María Josefa Carmela; 6 July 1744 – 8 December 1801) was the second surviving daughter of King Carlo VII of Naples and III of Sicily and his wife, Maria Amalia of Saxony. Born in Naples, she and her family arrived in Barcelona in October 1759 at the age of fifteen. At the accession of her father to the Spanish throne as Carlos III in August 1759, she became an Infanta of Spain. She lived at her father's court, then that of her brother Carlos IV. She died unmarried and childless.

== Life ==
=== Birth and background ===
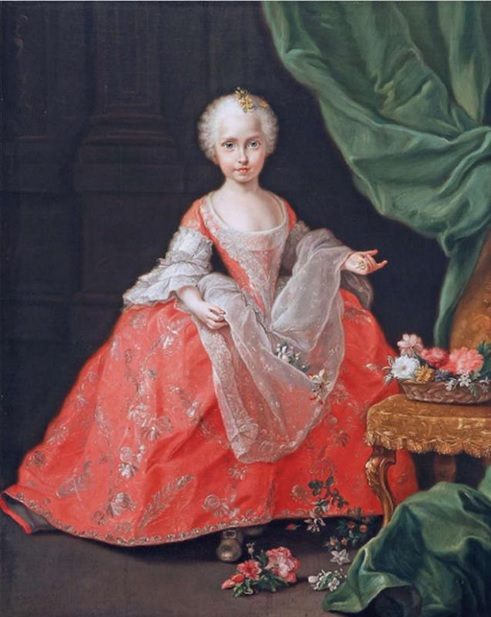
Portrait of Princess Maria Josefa of Naples and Sicily by Bonito (1748), Royal Palace of Madrid

Princess María Josefa of Naples and Sicily was born on 6 July 1744 in Gaeta. She was named after her maternal grandmother, Queen Maria Josepha of Austria (1699–1757). Her father had been King of Naples and Sicily as part of a personal union since 1734. Her parents married in 1738 and María Josefa was their first daughter to survive over the age of 5. Her parents' fourth child, at the time of her birth she had an older sister María Isabel Ana (1743–1749).

=== Marriage proposals ===
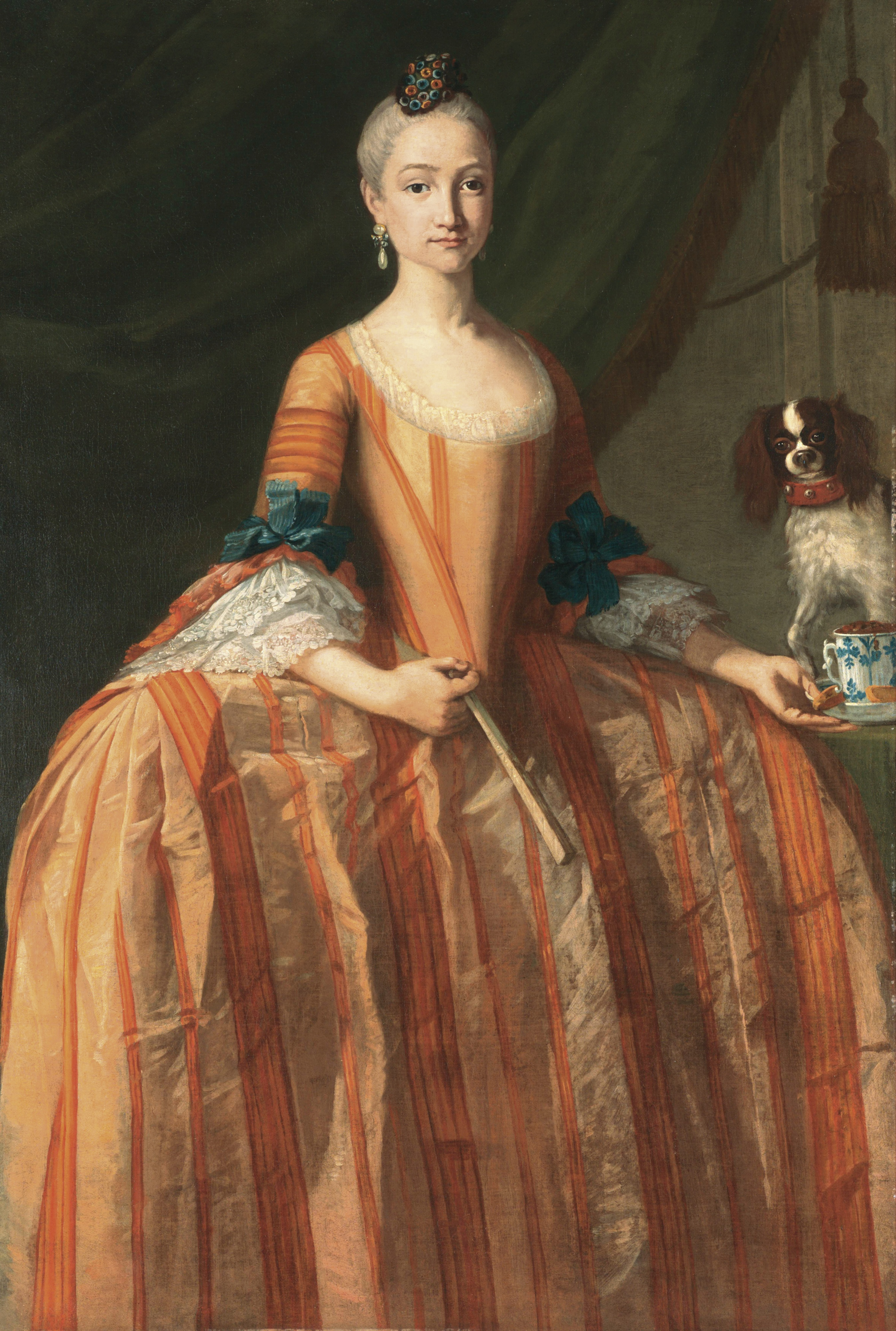
Portrait of Infanta Josefa of Naples of Spain by Bonito (1758–9)

Her younger sister Infanta María Luisa was chosen over María Josefa (1764) to marry the then Grand Duke of Tuscany, son of Empress Maria Theresa.

A princess of Naples and Sicily, she was also an Infanta of Spain through her father. This entitled María Josefa to the style of Royal Highness. Her parents were a devoted couple; her mother Maria Amalia of Saxony died barely a year after the family's arrival to Spain. Her father himself died in 1788. Afterwards, María Josefa lived at a court dominated by her sister-in-law, Maria Luisa of Parma, a granddaughter of Louis XV of France with whom she did not get along.

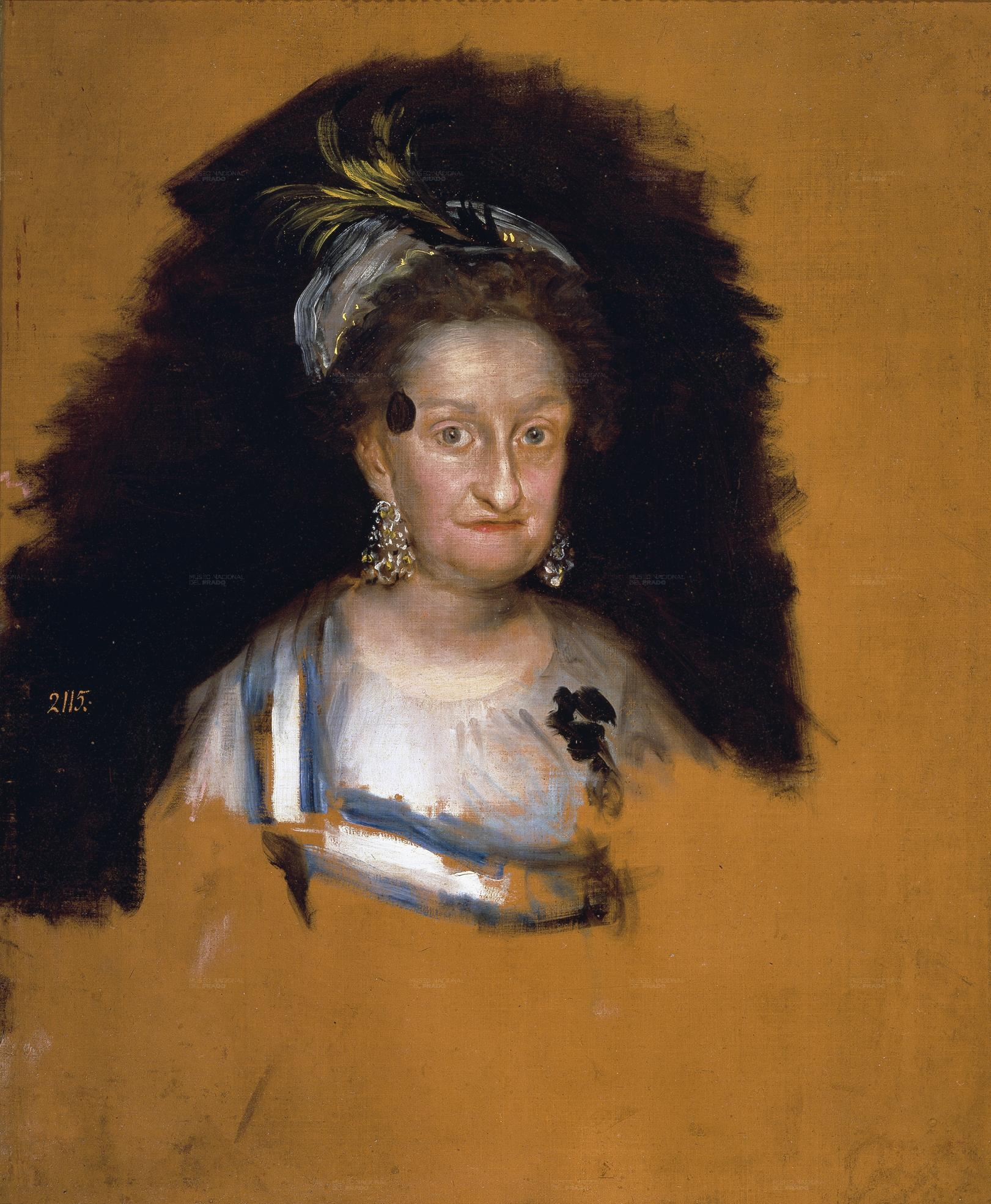
Portrait of Infanta María Josefa (1800) by Goya, preliminary sketch for the group portrait of The Family of Charles IV, Museo del Prado

María Josefa was a candidate for marrying the widower Louis XV, his wife Marie Leszczyńska dying in 1768 when María Josefa was just 24. Louis rejected the idea, being offended at her young age.

=== Later life and death ===
María Josefa remained unmarried. After the death of her father, she continued living in the Royal Palace with her brother Charles IV. She supported the Carmelite nuns, in whose convent of Saint Teresa she arranged to be buried.

She died at the Royal Palace of Madrid aged 57, before her brother Charles IV lost the throne and was exiled in 1808. In 1877 her body was transferred to El Escorial.

Arms of Infanta María Josefa of Spain.

== Ancestry ==
Ancestors of Infanta María Josefa of Spain

8. Louis, Grand Dauphin of France
4. Philip V of Spain
9. Maria Anna Victoria of Bavaria
2. Charles III of Spain
10. Odoardo Farnese, Hereditary Prince of Parma
5. Elisabeth Farnese
11. Dorothea Sophie of Neuburg
1. Infanta María Josefa of Spain
12. Augustus II of Poland
6. Augustus III of Poland
13. Christiane Eberhardine of Brandenburg-Bayreuth
3. Maria Amalia of Saxony
14. Joseph I, Holy Roman Emperor
7. Maria Josepha of Austria
15. Wilhelmine Amalie of Brunswick
