= Princess Maria Isabel Ana of Naples and Sicily =

Princess of Naples and Sicily (1743–1749)

Princess Maria Isabel Ana
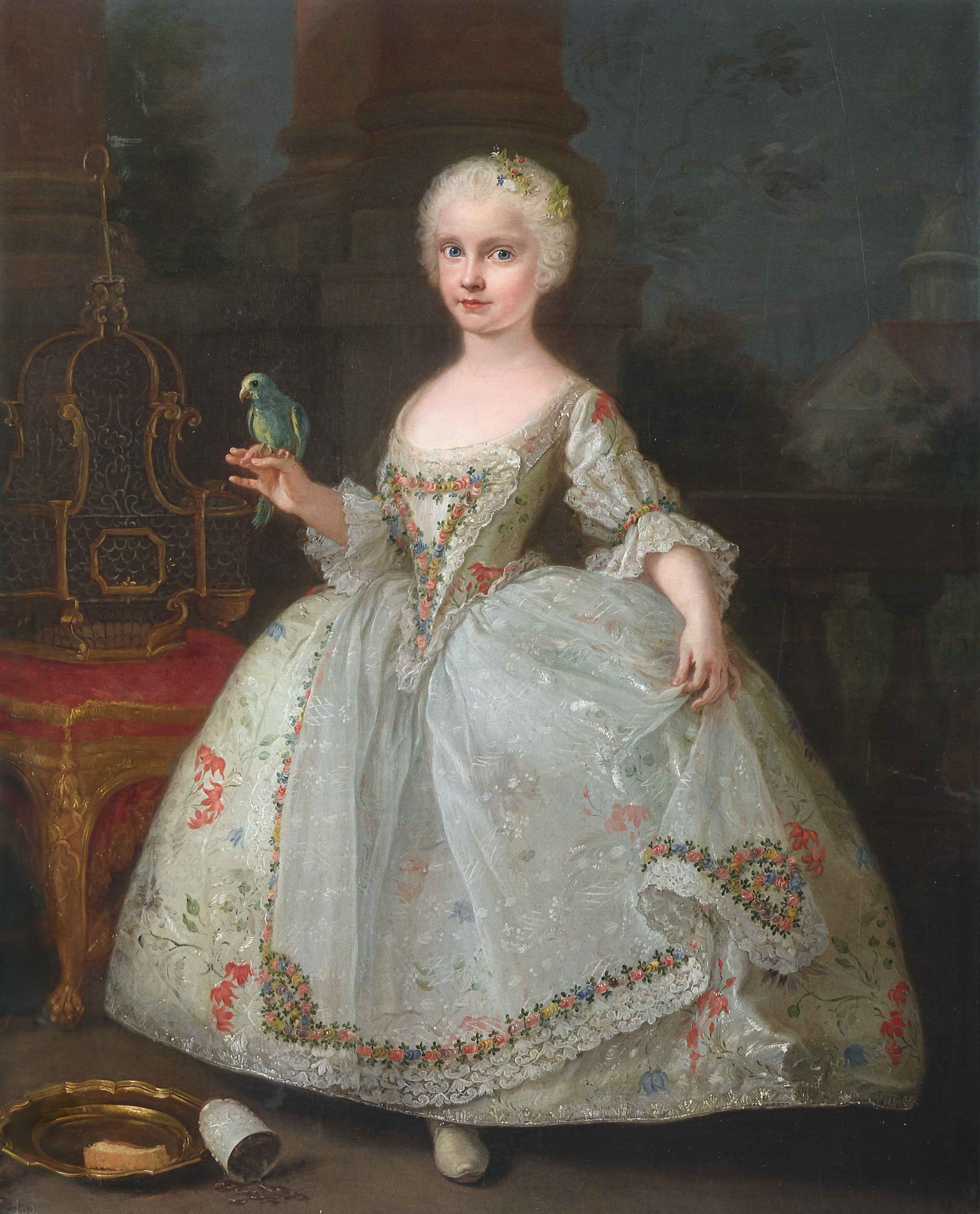
- Portrait by Giuseppe Bonito, c.1748
- Born: 30 April 1743; Museo di Capodimonte, Naples
- Died: 5 March 1749 (aged 5); Museo di Capodimonte, Naples
- Burial: 1749; Santa Chiara, Naples
- House: Bourbon
- Father: Charles VII of Naples (later Charles III of Spain)
- Mother: Maria Amalia of Saxony

Princess Maria Isabel Ana of Naples and Sicily (30 April 1743 – 5 March 1749) was the third daughter of Charles VII of Naples and III of Sicily and Maria Amalia of Saxony, who later became King Charles III and Queen Maria Amalia of Spain. She was the older sister of kings Charles IV of Spain and Ferdinand I of the Two Sicilies. She died before her father's accession to the Spanish throne, and thus never held the title of Infanta of Spain.

== Biography ==
=== Family ===
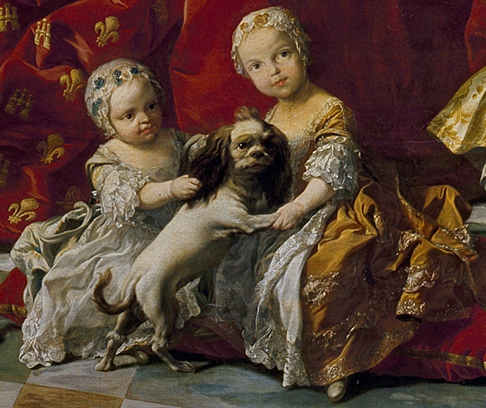
Maria (left) along with her cousin Princess Isabella of Parma in The Family of Philip V by Louis Michel van Loo in 1743.

Maria was the third child and daughter of King Charles VII of Naples and Sicily who had been reigning since 1735. Her father was the son of Philip V of Spain, and Elisabeth Farnese. Her mother was Maria Amalia of Saxony who was the daughter of Augustus III of Poland and of Maria Josepha of Austria.

=== Life and death ===
Maria was born in the Museo di Capodimonte in Naples on 30 April 1743. As she was born before her father's accession to the Spanish throne, she never held the title of Infanta of Spain.

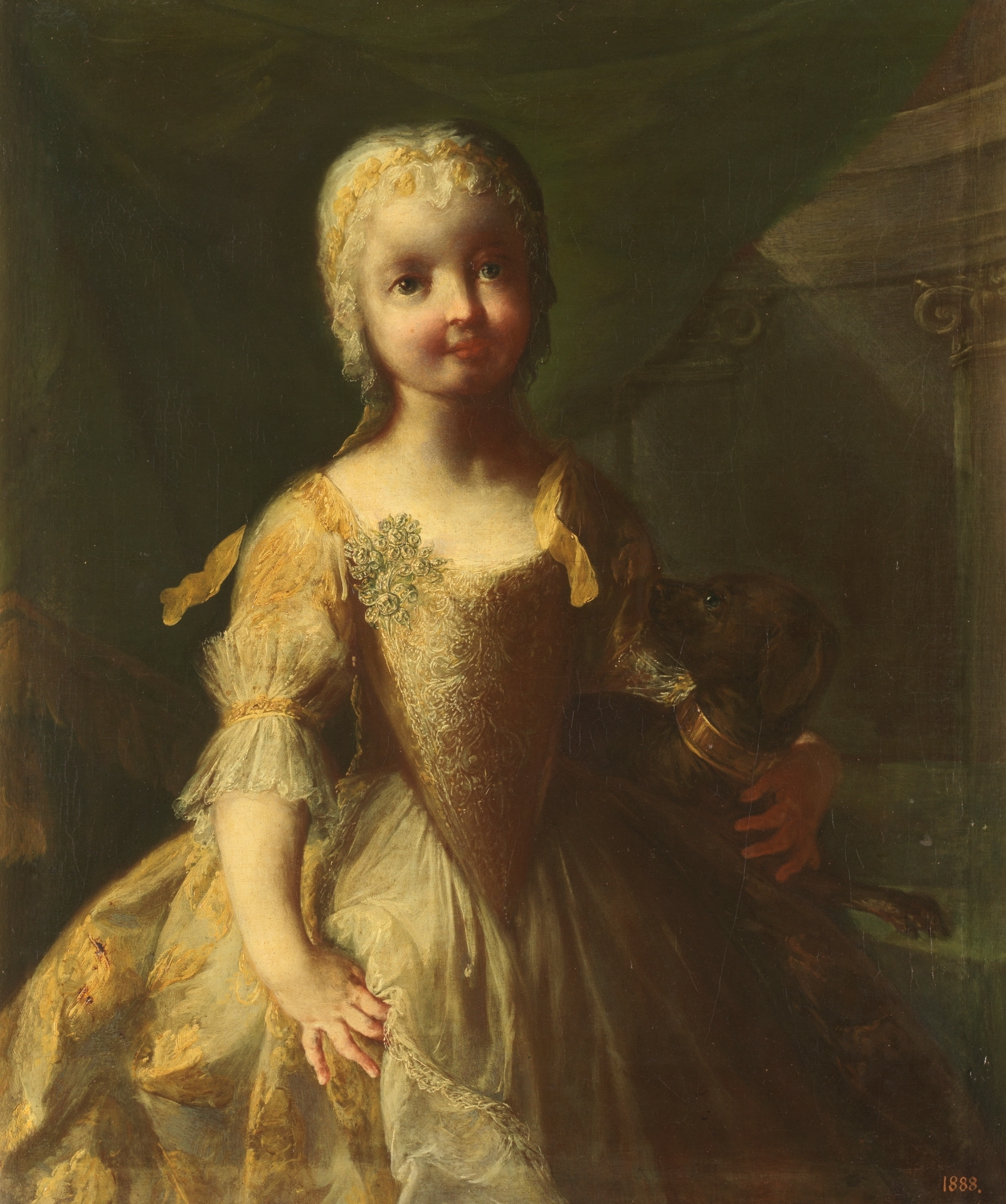
Portrait by Clemente Ruta, c. 1746

Her birth was met with little enthusiasm from the court of Naples and from her mother, Queen Maria Amalia, as she had given birth to two daughters twice before who had both died very early into their childhood. The birth of a son meant that the King could secure the succession to the thrones of Italy and to himself.

She received the name of her eldest sister who had died, on 2 November 1742. Maria died at the age of 5 in the Museo di Capodimonte in Naples and was buried in Santa Chiara, Naples.

== Ancestry ==
Ancestors of Princess Maria Isabel Ana of Naples and Sicily

8. Louis, Dauphin of France
4. Philip V of Spain
9. Maria Anna Victoria of Bavaria
2. Charles III of Spain
10. Odoardo Farnese, Hereditary Prince of Parma
5. Elisabeth Farnese
11. Dorothea Sophie of Neuburg
1. Princess Maria Isabel Ana of Naples and Sicily
12. Augustus II of Poland
6. Augustus III of Poland
13. Christiane Eberhardine of Brandenburg-Bayreuth
3. Maria Amalia of Saxony
14. Joseph I, Holy Roman Emperor
7. Maria Josepha of Austria
15. Wilhelmine Amalie of Brunswick
