= Battle of Velletri =

1744 battle

- Part of the War of the Austrian Succession
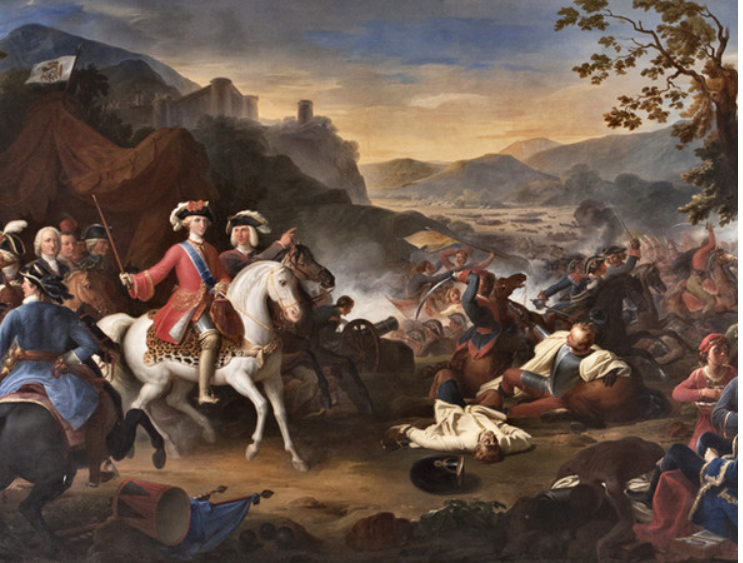
- Charles VII of Naples at the Battle of Velletri by Camillo Guerra. Oil on canvas (1850).
Date	16–17 June 1744; 10–11 August 1744
Location	Velletri (present-day Italy) 41°42′00″N 12°41′00″E
Result	Spanish-Neapolitan victory Austrian invasion of the Kingdom of Naples crippled

Belligerents
(Kingdom of the Two Sicilies) Kingdom of Naples; Kingdom of Spain	(Habsburg monarchy) Habsburg Monarchy

Commanders and leaders
(Kingdom of the Two Sicilies) Charles VII of Naples (Kingdom of the Two Sicilies) Francesco Eboli (Spain) Comte de Gages	(Habsburg monarchy) Prince of Lobkowicz (Habsburg monarchy) Maximilian Brown

Strength
25,000	25,000

Casualties and losses
Unknown killed or wounded 600 prisoners	1,500 killed or wounded 300 prisoners
- Location within Italy Battle of Velletri (Europe)

The Battle of Velletri were two battles between Austria and the Kingdom of Naples in 1744 during the War of the Austrian Succession around the city of Velletri, then part of the Papal States.

The first battle took place in the night of 16–17 June 1744, when the Spanish-Neapolitan army launched a surprise attack and conquered 3 important hills.

The second battle occurred on 10 and 11 August 1744, when the Austrian army, after seizing Velletri in a nighttime attack and capturing much of King Charles' royal entourage, were rapidly thrown back and retreated.

== Prelude ==
A few years earlier (1734), during the War of the Polish Succession, Austria had lost the Kingdom of Naples to Spain. Now that Austria and Spain were at war again in Northern Italy, Maria Theresia sent an army under command of the Prince of Lobkowicz to the northern border of the Kingdom of Naples through the Papal States, to reconquer their former possession.

The Prince of Lobkowicz, who was in no hurry to invade, allowed King Charles VII of Naples to assembe an army of 13,000 Neapolitan soldiers reinforced with 12,000 Spanish soldiers under the Comte de Gages, march it north and take up strong positions in and around the city of Velletri.

== First battle (17 June): surprise on Monte Piccolo ==
On 16 June, as darkness fell, 12,000 Neapolitan and Spanish troops moved towards the fortifications of Monte Piccolo. At dawn the Walloon grenadiers of the Spanish regiments occupied the battery of Monte Piccolo, while other troops occupied Maschio dell'Ariano and La Fajola and set fire to Pratoni del Vivaro. The commander of the Monte Piccolo garrison (General Pestaluzzi) was captured, probably drunk in a farmhouse of winemakers. The next day, Jean Thierry du Mont, comte de Gages gave the order to withdraw and preserve only the Artemisio ridge line.

== Second battle: the surprise attack of 11 August ==
On 28 July Lobkowitz received a request to transfer at least one regiment to Piedmont in support of the Kingdom of Sardinia, which was attacked by the Bourbons through the Alps. At this point Lobkowitz decided to try to surprise the Bourbons with a pincer attack, giving Maximilian Ulysses Browne 6,000 men to attack the Neapolitan left wing and keeping the rest to attack the Artemesio and the Neapolitan right wing. The purpose of the surprise attack was to capture the general staff of the Neapolitan army and in particular King Charles VII of Naples.

In the early hours of 11 August, Browne marched with his 6,000 men on Velletri. His infantry managed to force Porta Napoletana and enter the town. Once in the town the columns headed towards Palazzo Ginnetti, where King Charles was staying, but in the meantime the King had been able to escape and take refuge in Villa Antonelli, the seat of the tactical headquarters, where his bodyguard of some 800 men was located and from where he subsequently directed the battle.

Gages, who was at Artemisio, realizing what was happening, alerted the right wing of the Neapolitan army to attempt a counterattack. In the meantime, Browne's infantry had begun to pillage the town, thus losing the opportunity to inflict a decisive defeat on the Neapolitans. Browne, who saw that his force now was in danger of encirclement, had no other option than to order a retreat, which began around 7 AM and by 9 AM, most of his troops were back in the Austrian camp. They had taken 574 prisoners (including General Mariani, and 74 officers), 12 flags and 3 cavalry standards, but their main goal was not achieved.

The simultaneous attack by the Austrians under command of General Andrássy on the Neapolitan right wing at Artemisio, was also repelled, with the loss of some 500 Austrian casualties.

== Legacy ==
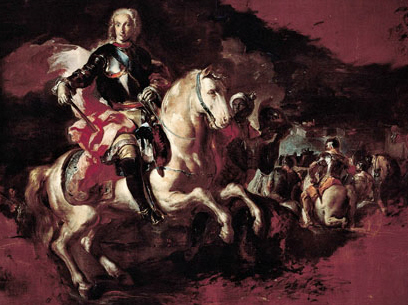
Painting of Charles VII, victorious at the Battle of Velletri

Raimondo di Sangro took part in the battle of Velletri, distinguishing himself for his courage and skill. Act 3 of the drama Don Álvaro o la fuerza del sino by Ángel de Saavedra, Duke of Rivas, and the opera La forza del destino by Giuseppe Verdi, based on Saavedra's play, is set during the Battle of Velletri.

== Sources ==
- Levillain, Philippe (2002), The Papacy: An Encyclopedia, Routeledge, ISBN 0-415-92230-5
- Browning, Reed. The War of the Austrian Succession. Alan Sutton Publishing, 1994.
- Virgilio Ilari e Giancarlo Boeri, Velletri 1744. La mancata riconquista austriaca delle due Sicilie, Roma, Nadir Media Edizioni, 2019, ISBN 9788894132588.
