= Francesco Liani =

Italian painter

Francesco Liani (c.1712 - 1780) was an Italian painter, mainly known for his portraits of the Neapolitan royal family.

Born in Borgo San Donnino (now known as Fidenza), he moved to Naples in 1740 as part of the court of Charles of Bourbon (the future Charles III of Spain), for whom he produced equestrian portraits of himself and his wife. He also produced Portrait of Ferdinand IV of Bourbon (1766, Royal Museum Copenhagen) and Portrait of Ferdinand IV in Armour (National Museum of Capodimonte, Naples) for him. He also painted several noble families from Naples, including the De Sangro (part of the line of marquesses of San Lucido and dukes of Sangro). He died in Naples.

His many religious works were influenced by Neapolitan artists such as Domenico Mondo, Pietro Bardellino and Giuseppe Bonito as well as the art of Liani's native Emilia and the work of Anton Raphael Mengs, then active in Naples. He painted Stations of the Cross for Capua Cathedral, a Nativity and a Presentation in the Temple (Capodimonte), three nativity scenes and an Adoration of the Magi (Royal Palace of Naples), a series of eight paintings on the passion (Palace of Caserta) and The Wedding at Cana (Museo Campano, Capua).
