= Charles IV of Spain =

King of Spain from 1788 to 1808

Charles IV
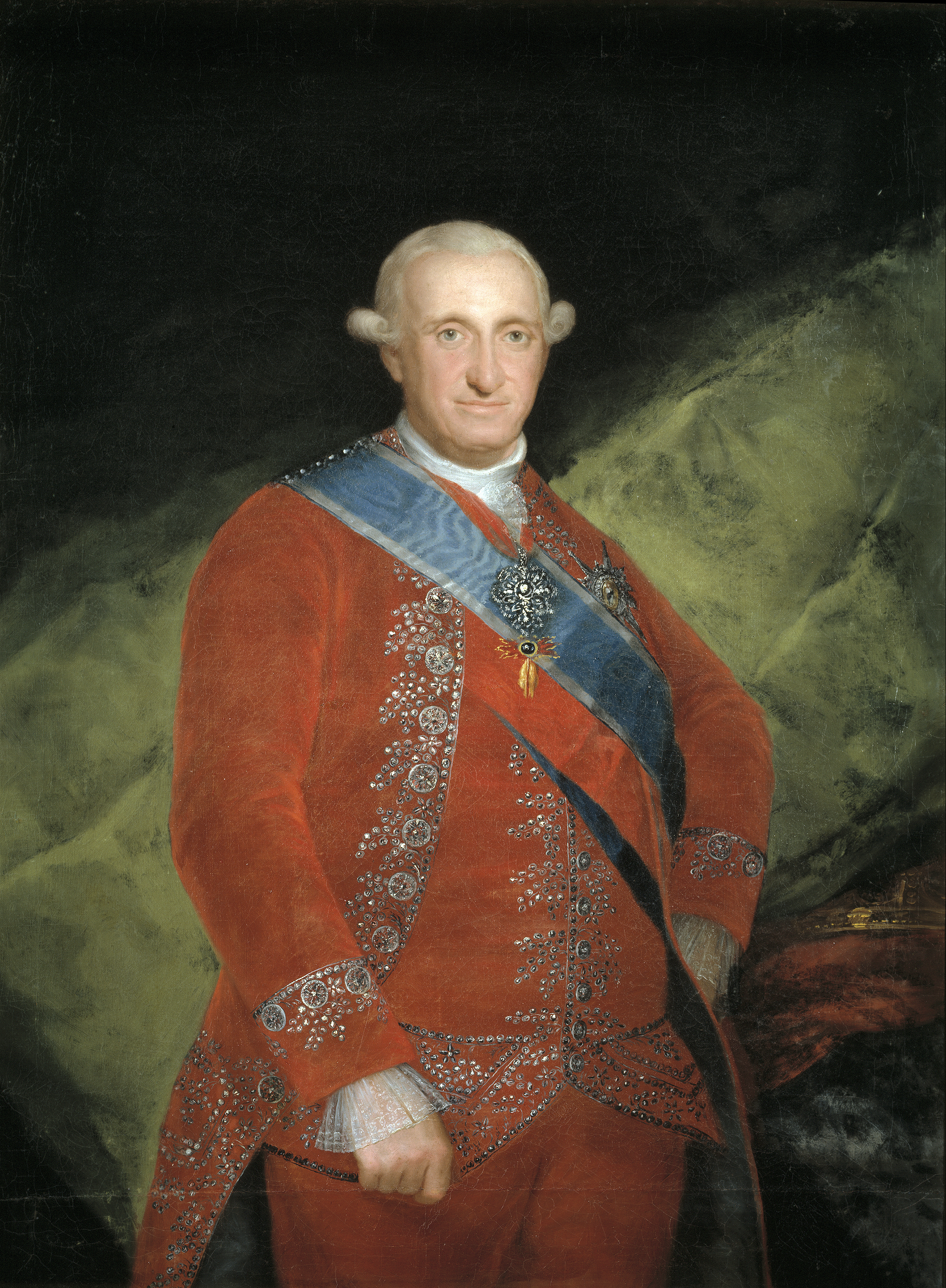
- Portrait by Francisco Goya, 1789

King of Spain
- Reign: 14 December 1788 – 19 March 1808
- Predecessor: Charles III
- Successor: Ferdinand VII
- Chief ministers: See list: The Count of Floridablanca (1788–1792); The Count of Aranda (1792–1792); The Prince of the Peace (1792–1798); Francisco Saavedra de Sangronis (1798–1799); Mariano Luis de Urquijo (1799–1799); Pedro Cevallos (1799–1808); Gonzalo O'Farrill (1808–1808)
- Born: 11 November 1748; Palace of Portici, Naples
- Died: 19 January 1819 (aged 70); Naples, Kingdom of the Two Sicilies
- Burial: El Escorial
- Spouse: Maria Luisa of Parma (m. 1765; died 1819)
- Issue: Carlota Joaquina, Queen of Portugal and Brazil; Infanta María Amalia; María Luisa, Queen of Etruria; Ferdinand VII, King of Spain; Infante Carlos, Count of Molina; María Isabel, Queen of the Two Sicilies; Infante Francisco de Paula
Names
- Spanish: Carlos Antonio Pascual Francisco Javier Juan Nepomuceno José Januario Serafín Diego de Borbón y Sajonia
- House: Bourbon
- Father: Charles III of Spain
- Mother: Maria Amalia of Saxony

Charles IV (Spanish: Carlos Antonio Pascual Francisco Javier Juan Nepomuceno José Januario Serafín Diego de Borbón y Sajonia; 11 November 1748 – 19 January 1819) was King of Spain and ruler of the Spanish Empire from 1788 to 1808.

The Spain inherited by Charles IV gave few indications of instability, but during his reign, Spain entered a series of disadvantageous alliances and his regime constantly sought cash to deal with the exigencies of war. He detested his son and heir Ferdinand, who led the unsuccessful El Escorial Conspiracy and later forced Charles's abdication after the Tumult of Aranjuez in March 1808, along with ousting Charles's widely hated first minister Manuel Godoy. Summoned to Bayonne by Napoleon Bonaparte, who forced Ferdinand VII to abdicate, Charles IV also abdicated, paving the way for Napoleon to place his elder brother Joseph Bonaparte on the throne of Spain. The reign of Charles IV turned out to be a major negative turning point in Spanish history.

== Early life ==
Charles was the second son of Charles III and his wife, Maria Amalia of Saxony. He was born in Naples (11 November 1748), while his father was King of Naples and Sicily. His elder brother Don Felipe was passed over for both thrones, due to his learning disabilities and epilepsy. In Naples and Sicily, Charles was referred to as the Prince of Taranto. He was called El Cazador (meaning "the Hunter"), due to his preference for sport and hunting, rather than dealing with affairs of state. Charles is considered by historian Stanley G. Payne as "good-hearted but weak and simple-minded".

== Reign ==
In 1788, Charles III died; Charles IV succeeded to the throne and ruled for the next two decades. Even though he had a profound belief in the sanctity of the monarchy and kept up the appearance of an absolute, powerful king, Charles never took more than a passive part in his own government. The affairs of government were left to his wife, Maria Luisa, and the man he appointed first minister, Manuel de Godoy. Charles occupied himself with hunting in the period that saw the outbreak of the French Revolution, the executions of his Bourbon relative Louis XVI of France and his queen, Marie Antoinette, and the rise of Napoleon Bonaparte. Ideas of the Age of Enlightenment had come to Spain with the accession of the first Spanish Bourbon, Philip V. Charles' father, Charles III, had pursued an active policy of reform that sought to reinvigorate Spain politically and economically and make the Spanish Empire more closely an appendage of the metropole. Charles III was an active, working monarch with experienced first ministers to help reach decisions. Charles IV, by contrast, was a do-nothing king, with a domineering wife and an inexperienced but ambitious first minister, Godoy. The combination of a king not up to the task of governance, the queen widely perceived to take lovers (including Godoy) and the first minister with an agenda of his own earned the monarchy increased alienation from its subjects.

Upon ascending to the throne, Charles IV intended to maintain the policies of his father and, accordingly, retained his prime minister, the Count of Floridablanca. Floridablanca avoided war with Great Britain in the Nootka Sound crisis, where a minor trade and navigation dispute off the west coast of Vancouver Island in 1789 could have blown up into a major conflict. Spain could have drawn on its French ally in support against Britain but they refused. In a humiliating move, Floridablanca had no choice but to capitulate to British terms and thereby negotiated with them. In 1792, political and personal enemies ousted Floridablanca from office, replacing him with the Count of Aranda. However, in the wake of the war against Republican France, the liberal-leaning Count of Aranda was himself replaced by Manuel de Godoy, a favorite of the Queen and widely believed to be her lover, who enjoyed the lasting favor of the King.

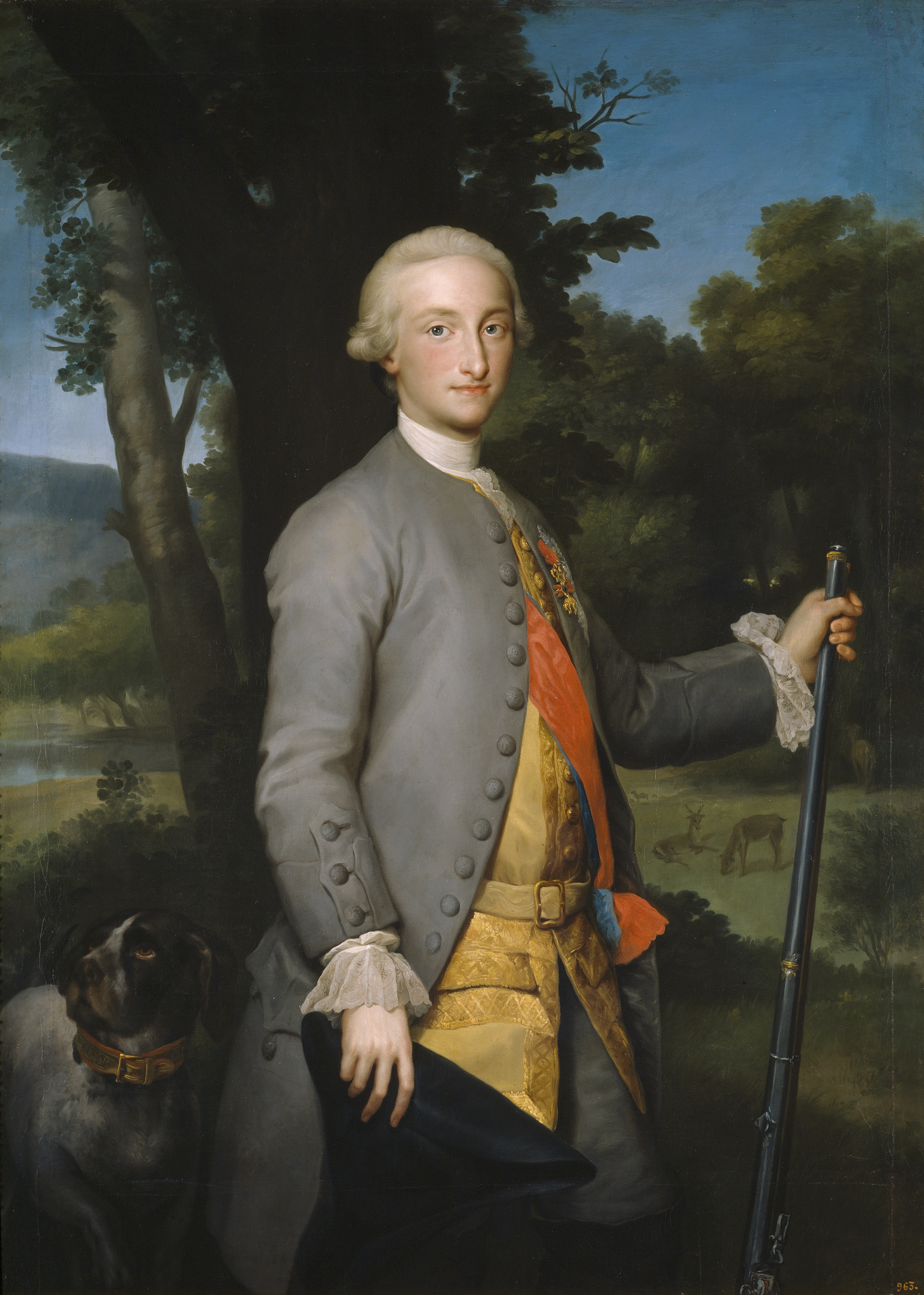
Charles as Prince of Asturias, portrait by Anton Raphael Mengs (ca. 1765)

Under Charles IV, scientific expeditions continued to be sent by the crown, some of which were initially authorized by Charles III. The Royal Botanical Expedition to New Granada (1783–1816), and the Royal Botanical Expedition to New Spain (1787–1803), were funded by the crown. The Malaspina Expedition (1789–94) was an important scientific expedition headed by Spanish naval commander Alejandro Malaspina, with naturalists and botanical illustrators gathering information for the Spanish crown. In 1803, he authorized the Balmis Expedition, aimed at vaccinating Spain's overseas territories against smallpox. In 1799, Charles IV authorized Prussian aristocrat and scientist Alexander von Humboldt to travel freely in Spanish America, with royal officials encouraged to aid him in his investigation of key areas of Spain's empire. Humboldt's Political Essay on the Kingdom of New Spain was a key publication from his five-year travels.

Apex of Spanish Empire in 1790

Spain's economic problems were of long standing, but deteriorated further when Spain was ensnared in wars that its ally France pursued. Financial needs drove his domestic and foreign policy. Godoy's economic policies increased discontent with Charles's regime. In an attempt to implement major economic changes, Gaspar Melchor de Jovellanos, a reformist, Jansenist conservative proposed major structural reform of land tenure to promote the revival of agriculture. His 1795 work Informe en el expediente de ley agraria argued that Spain needed thriving agriculture to allow its population to grow and prosper. In his analysis, the concentration of land ownership and traditions and institutional barriers were at the heart of agriculture's problems. He called for division and sale of public lands, which were held by villages, as well as the swaths of Spanish territory controlled by the Mesta, the organization of livestock owners who had kept grazing lands as an asset for their use. Jovellanos also argued for the abolition of entailed properties (mayorazgos), which allowed landed estates to pass undivided through generations of aristocrats, as well as sale of lands held by the Catholic Church. The aim of these policies was to create in Spain yeoman farmers, who would pursue their self-interest and make agricultural land more productive. The cost would be to undermine the power of the Church and the aristocracy.

As the situation with immediate revenue became more fraught, the crown in 1804 imposed measures in its overseas empire forcing the Catholic Church to call in immediately the mortgages it had extended on a long-term. Although aimed at undermining the wealth and power of the church, the wealthy landowning elites were faced with financial ruin, since they had no way to make full payment on their mortgaged properties. This ill-considered royal decree has been seen as a major factor in the independence movement in New Spain (Mexico). The decree was in abeyance once Charles and Ferdinand abdicated, but it undermined elite support while in force.

In foreign policy Godoy continued Abarca de Bolea's policy of neutrality toward as France, but after Spain protested the execution of Louis XVI of France in 1793, France declared war on Spain. After the declaration, Portugal and Spain signed a treaty of mutual protection against France. In 1796 France forced Godoy to enter into an alliance, and declare war on the Kingdom of Great Britain. As a consequence, Spain became one of the maritime empires to have been allied with Republican France in the French Revolutionary War, and for a considerable duration.

Spain remained an ally of France for a while, lost against the British in the battle of Trafalgar, and supported the Continental Blockade. After Napoleon's victory over Prussia in 1807, Godoy kept Spain with the French side.

But the switching of alliances devalued Charles's position as a trustworthy ally, increasing Godoy's unpopularity, and strengthening the fernandistas (supporters of Crown Prince Ferdinand), who favoured an alliance with the United Kingdom.

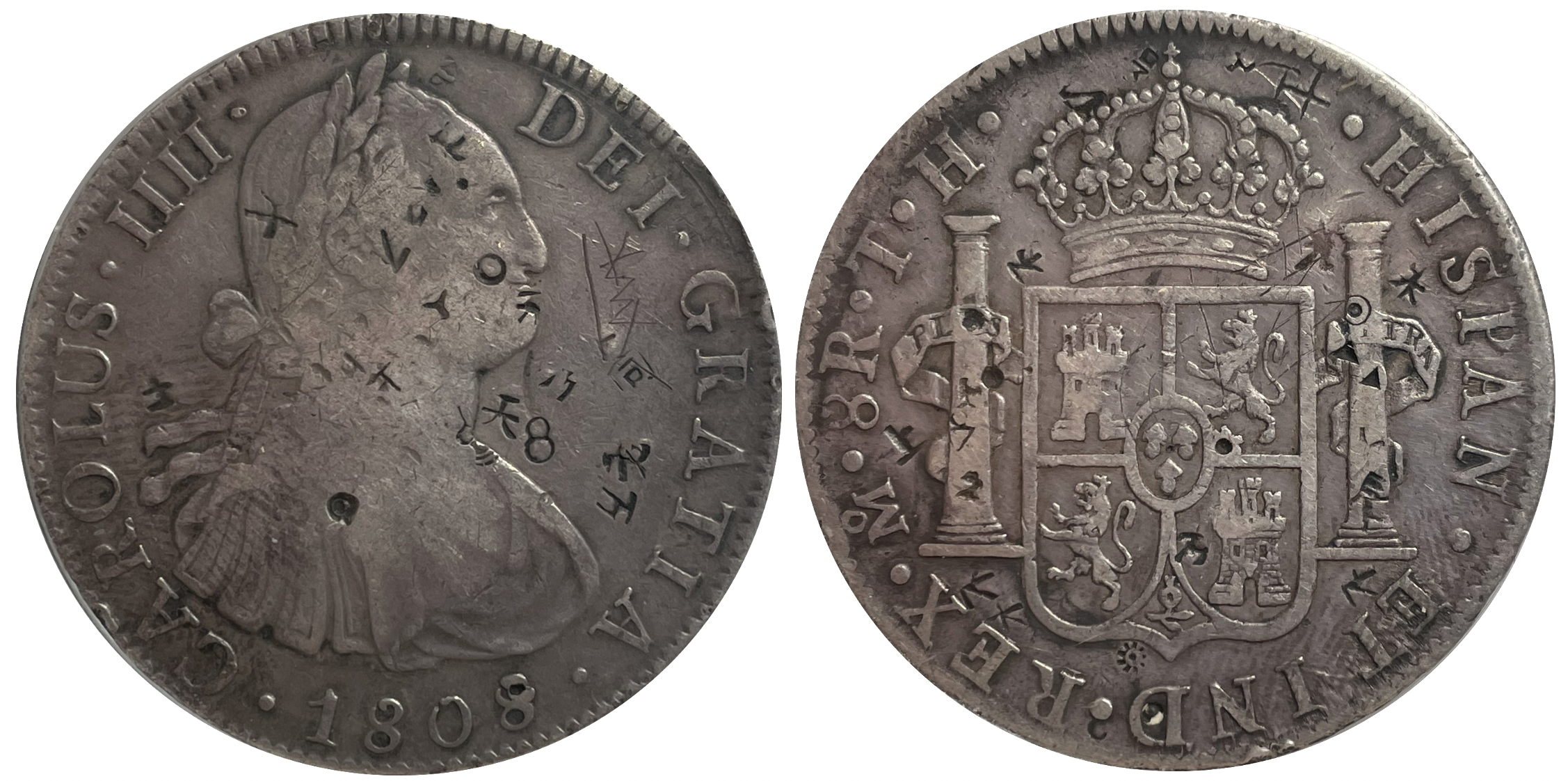
8 reales Carolus IV 1808 Chopmark

Economic troubles, rumors about a sexual relationship between the Queen and Godoy, and the King's ineptitude, caused the monarchy to decline in prestige among the population. Anxious to take over from his father, and jealous of the prime minister, Crown Prince Ferdinand attempted to overthrow the King in an aborted coup in 1807. He was successful in 1808, forcing his father's abdication following the Tumult of Aranjuez.

=== Abdications of Bayonne ===
Riots, and a popular revolt at the winter palace Aranjuez, in 1808 forced the king to abdicate on 19 March, in favor of his son. Ferdinand took the throne as Ferdinand VII, but was mistrusted by Napoleon, who had 100,000 soldiers stationed in Spain by that time due to the ongoing War of the Third Coalition.

The ousted king, having appealed to Napoleon for help in regaining his throne, was summoned before Napoleon in Bayonne, along with his son, in April 1808. Napoleon forced both Charles and his son to abdicate, declared the Bourbon dynasty of Spain deposed, and installed his brother, Joseph Bonaparte, as King Joseph I of Spain, which began the Peninsular War.

== Later life and death ==
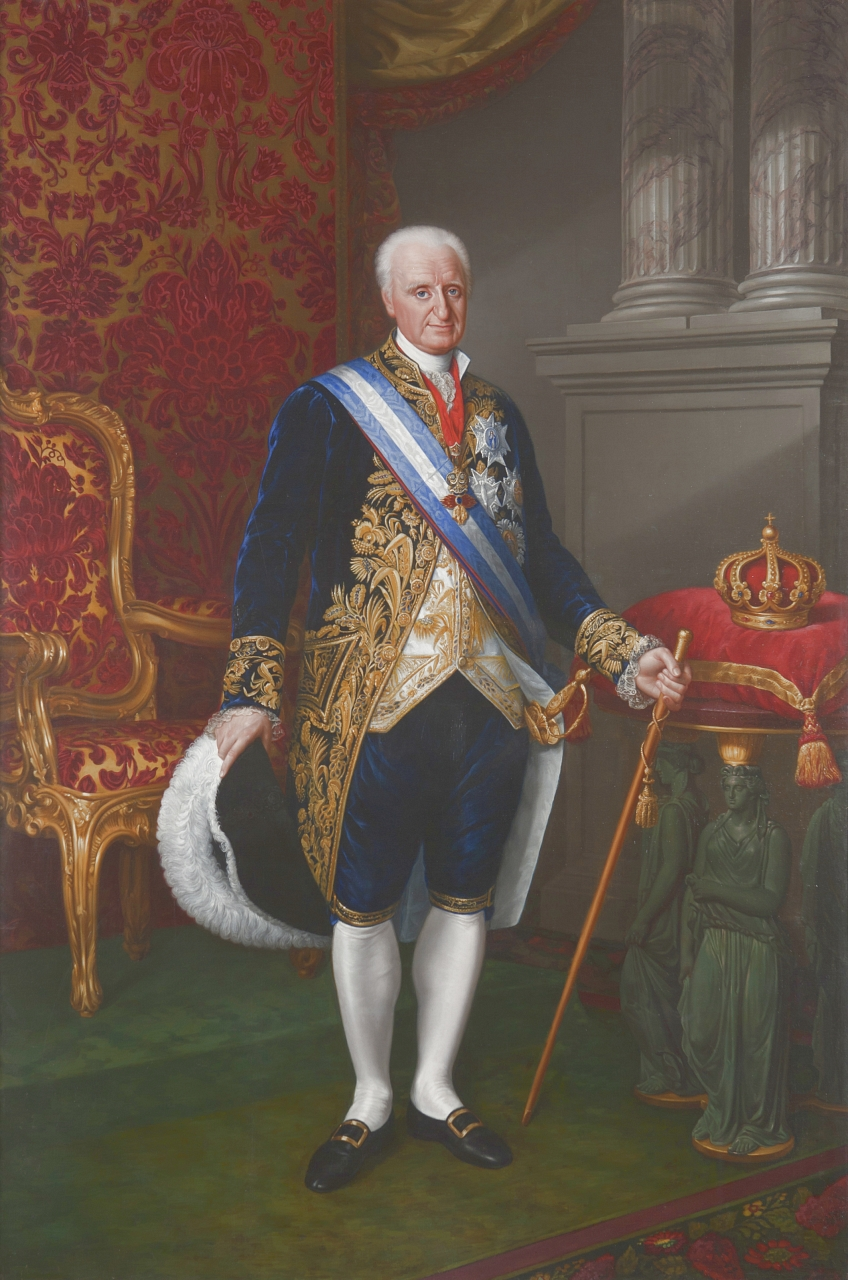
The ex-king in 1818

Following Napoleon's deposing of the Bourbon dynasty, the ex-King, his wife, and former prime minister Godoy were held captive in France first at the château de Compiègne and three years in Marseille (where a neighborhood was named after him). After the collapse of the regime installed by Napoleon, Ferdinand VII was restored to the throne. The former Charles IV drifted about Europe until 1812, when he finally settled in Rome, in the Palazzo Barberini. His wife died on 2 January 1819, followed shortly by Charles, who died on 19 January of the same year. At the time of his death Charles was visiting his brother Ferdinand I of the Two Sicilies in Naples. Sir Francis Ronalds included a detailed description of the funeral in his travel journal.

== Character ==
Well-meaning and pious, Charles IV floundered in a series of international crises beyond his capacity to handle. He was said to be 'despotic, sluggish and stupid'. He was also noted as a former wrestler who spent many a time hunting. He was painted by Francisco Goya in a number of official court portraits, which numerous art critics have seen as satires on the King's stout vacuity.

== Marriage and children ==
Charles IV married his first cousin Maria Louisa, the daughter of Philip, Duke of Parma, in 1765. The couple had fourteen children, seven of whom survived into adulthood:

Children of King Charles IV
Name	Portrait	Lifespan	Notes
Carlos Clemente; Infante of Spain		19 September 1771 – 7 March 1774	Born and died at El Escorial; baptized on the same day he was born, with Charles III representing "the Holy Father" at the christening. Pope Clement XIV celebrated Carlos' birth and sent the infant consecrated swaddling clothes. Died young however.
Carlota Joaquina; Queen of Portugal and the Algarves		25 April 1775 – 7 January 1830	Born at the Royal Palace of Aranjuez, she married her first cousin John VI of Portugal in 1785 and became Queen consort of Portugal in 1816. Had issue, including the future Pedro I of Brazil. She died at Queluz National Palace.
Maria Luisa; Infanta of Spain		11 September 1777 – 2 July 1782	Born and died at the Royal Palace of La Granja de San Ildefonso died young.
María Amalia; Infanta of Spain		9 January 1779 – 22 July 1798	Born at the Royal Palace of Aranjuez, she married her uncle Infante Antonio Pascual of Spain in 1795. She gave birth to a stillborn son in 1798 and died shortly thereafter.
Carlos Domingo; Infante of Spain		5 March 1780 – 11 June 1783	Born at the Royal Palace of El Pardo and died at the Royal Palace of Aranjuez. After his birth, his father pardoned all of the convicts from Puerto San Julián as a sign of celebration. Died in childhood.
Maria Luisa; Queen of Etruria; Duchess of Lucca		6 July 1782 – 13 March 1824	Born at the Royal Palace of La Granja de San Ildefonso, she married her first cousin Louis, King of Etruria in 1795 and had issue, including Charles II, Duke of Parma. Became Duchess of Lucca in her own right in 1817 and died in Rome in 1824 of cancer.
Carlos Francisco de Paula; Infante of Spain		5 September 1783 – 11 November 1784	Twins, born and died at the Royal Palace of La Granja de San Ildefonso. Their birth was an important event for the people of Spain and provided security for the succession, a security which was truncated with the early deaths of Carlos and Felipe. Both died in childhood.
Felipe Francisco de Paula; Infante of Spain		5 September 1783 – 18 October 1784	Twins, born and died at the Royal Palace of La Granja de San Ildefonso. Their birth was an important event for the people of Spain and provided security for the succession, a security which was truncated with the early deaths of Carlos and Felipe. Both died in childhood.
Fernando (VII); King of Spain		14 October 1784 – 29 September 1833	Born and died at El Escorial, he succeeded his father as King in 1808, but was deposed by Joseph Bonaparte one month later. Married his first cousin Princess Maria Antonia of Naples and Sicily in 1802, no issue. Re-instated as King in 1813. Married his niece Maria Isabel of Portugal in 1816, had issue. Married Maria Josepha Amalia of Saxony in 1819, no issue. Married his niece Maria Christina of the Two Sicilies in 1829 and had issue, including the future Isabella II of Spain. Died in 1833.
Carlos María Isidro Benito; Count of Molina		29 March 1788 – 10 March 1855	Born at the Royal Palace of Aranjuez. Married his niece Infanta Maria Francisca of Portugal in 1816 and had issue. Married his niece Maria Teresa, Princess of Beira in 1838, no issue. First Carlist pretender to the throne of Spain as "Carlos V". Used the title "Count of Molina" between 1845 and his death in 1855.
María Isabel; Queen of the Two Sicilies		6 July 1789 – 13 September 1848	Born at the Royal Palace of Madrid, she married her first cousin Francis I of the Two Sicilies in 1802 and had issue, including the future Ferdinand II of the Two Sicilies. Queen consort between 1825 and 1830, her husband's death. Died at the Palace of Portici in 1848.
Maria Teresa; Infanta of Spain		16 February 1791 – 2 November 1794	Born at the Royal Palace of Aranjuez and died at El Escorial. Died in Childhood of smallpox.
Felipe Maria; Infante of Spain		28 March 1792 – 1 March 1794	Born at the Royal Palace of Aranjuez and died at the Royal Palace of Madrid. Died in childhood.
Francisco de Paula		10 March 1794 – 13 August 1865	Born at the Royal Palace of Aranjuez, he married his niece Princess Luisa Carlotta of Naples and Sicily in 1819 and had issue. Died in Madrid in 1865.

== Ancestors ==
Ancestors of Charles IV of Spain

8. Louis, Dauphin of France
4. Philip V of Spain
9. Maria Anna Victoria of Bavaria
2. Charles III of Spain
10. Odoardo Farnese, Hereditary Prince of Parma
5. Elisabeth Farnese
11. Dorothea Sophie of Neuburg
1. Charles IV of Spain
12. Augustus II of Poland
6. Augustus III of Poland
13. Christiane Eberhardine of Brandenburg-Bayreuth
3. Maria Amalia of Saxony
14. Joseph I, Holy Roman Emperor
7. Maria Josepha of Austria
15. Wilhelmine Amalie of Brunswick

== See also ==
- History of Spain (1700-1810)

Charles IV of Spain House of Bourbon Cadet branch of the Capetian dynasty Born: 11 November 1748 Died: 20 January 1819
Regnal titles
Preceded by Charles III	King of Spain; 1788–1808	Succeeded by Ferdinand VII
Spanish royalty
Vacant Title last held by Ferdinand (VI)	Prince of Asturias; 1759–1788	Succeeded by Ferdinand (VII)
