= Giovanni Antonio Medrano =

Italian architect

Giovanni Antonio Medrano (1703–1760) was an Italian architect.

Born in Sciacca, Sicily, he became a brigadier in the army of Charles of Bourbon, while he was king of the Two Sicilies. Following the Battle of Bitonto in 1734, Charles had Medrano construct a commemorative obelisk in Bitonto.

In 1737, Charles commissioned Medrano to design the new San Carlo opera house in Naples. Medrano then went on to design the Museo di Capodimonte, Charles's new palace and museum in Naples. Medrano started work on this, with others, in 1738, but the building was not finally completed until 1840.

In 1741 he was accused, along with an associate Angelo Carasale, with fraud on taxes in the conduct of business at Capodimonte. After eighteen months in prison, he was dismissed and exiled. He was pardoned by the corresponding reduction of sentence and returned to Italy in 1746, but his professional work was severely criticized by the Neapolitan engineers of the time. Marginalized from public office, he obtained few private commissions. In probability he died in 1760.
