= Infante Philip, Duke of Calabria =

Infante Philip
- Duke of Calabria
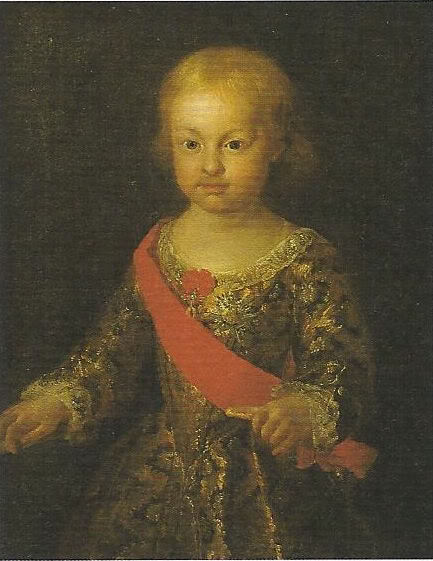
- Portrait by Francesco Liani, 1750
- Born: 13 June 1747; Palace of Portici, Portici, Kingdom of Naples
- Died: 19 September 1777 (aged 30); Palace of Portici, Portici, Kingdom of Naples
- Burial: Basilica of Santa Chiara, Naples
Names
- Filippo Antonio Gennaro Pasquale Francesco de Paula di Borbone
- House: Bourbons of Naples
- Father: Charles VII & V of Naples & Sicily
- Mother: Maria Amalia of Saxony

Infante Philip, Duke of Calabria (13 June 1747 – 19 September 1777) was the eldest son and heir-apparent of Charles III of Spain, but was excluded from the succession to the thrones of Spain and Naples due to his intellectual disability. His younger brothers, Charles IV of Spain and Ferdinand I of the Two Sicilies, replaced him in the succession. When his father became King of Spain in 1759, Philip remained in Naples where he lived until his death from smallpox at the age of 30.

== Heir apparent ==
Born at the Royal Palace of Portici in the Kingdom of Naples, he was the sixth child and eldest son of Charles VII and V, then King of Naples and Sicily, and his wife Maria Amalia of Saxony. His birth was a joyful event since his parents previously had five princesses, three of whom had died in childhood. The Prince was baptized Filippo Antonio Gennaro Pasquale Francesco de Paula. His grandfather, King Philip V of Spain, in whose honor he was named, had died on 9 July 1746. The child's godparents were his paternal uncle and aunt, King Ferdinand VI of Spain and Barbara of Portugal. As the heir apparent to his father, he was given the title of Duke of Calabria; the traditional title for the heir apparent of the Kingdom of Naples. Although he appeared healthy, it was soon evident that there was something wrong with him. His wet nurses had to be changed several times and the child had epileptic fits. As he grew up, it was confirmed that he had disabilities, especially his peculiar face. According to one observer, the prince had "a great heaviness of head, which makes him gloomy and ill-humored".

In 1754, the ambassador of Sardinia reported that " the prince royal does not appear to enjoy good health" adding that "there is something in his eyes that does not harmonize with the rest of his features. I have been assure[d] that although he is seven years old he does not speak, and that he can scarcely utter a word." However, his parents tried to conceal his deficiencies both from the public and from themselves, making the child appear in court ceremonies as if there was nothing wrong with him. Until the age of seven, Philip remained with his sisters and younger brothers under the care of a governess. In 1755, he was placed with his brother Charles under the tutorship of the Prince of San Nicandro.

== Exclusion from the succession ==
The death of his half-uncle, King Ferdinand VI of Spain, on August 10, 1759, forced the parents to confront the status of their son. Since Charles III was to depart to Spain to take possession of the Spanish crown, he had to abdicate the thrones of Naples and Sicily in favour of a son. A committee of high officials, magistrates and six physicians examined the mental state of the Prince, who was twelve years old at the time, to determine his capacity to reign. The Prince was kept under close observation for two weeks after which the committee declared that his mental state made him incapable to govern and he was thus excluded from the succession to the thrones due to his mental disabilities. His younger brothers Charles and Ferdinand replaced him in the lines of succession. Philip remained in Naples out of sight from the Neapolitan courts at the palaces of Capodimonte and the newly constructed Palace of Caserta. His brother Ferdinand visited him and showed him affection treating him almost like a mascot.

"He is rarely visible," wrote Samuel Sharp, "but the regency think proper to exhibit him a few times a year, namely, when the king removes from Naples to Portici, and from Portici to Naples. I took the opportunity, when the family came to town, of entertaining myself with the spectacle... The administration acts wisely in exposing him now and then to the eyes of the public, as the very sight of him is a full vindication of their conduct in regard to the sentence of idiotism and disinheritance passed on him some years ago. The court was in mourning, but he was as well dressed as a youth in mourning can be, and his hair as well combed and as well powdered. With all these advantages, however, the very first glance of him convinced me that he wants every one faculty of the mind. He has that wandering roll of the eye which is peculiar to idiots and new born infants, who, not having the endowment of thought and reflection, consequently cannot fix their attention to one object. There are some knavish quacks, and some silly doctors, who say the cure is not impossible, and that he may be restored to his senses... By what I can learn, he leads a happy kind of animal life. He eats and drinks with much pleasure, is subject to no gust of passion, and enjoys such infantile amusements as a child in arms may be supposed to enjoy.

== Later life ==
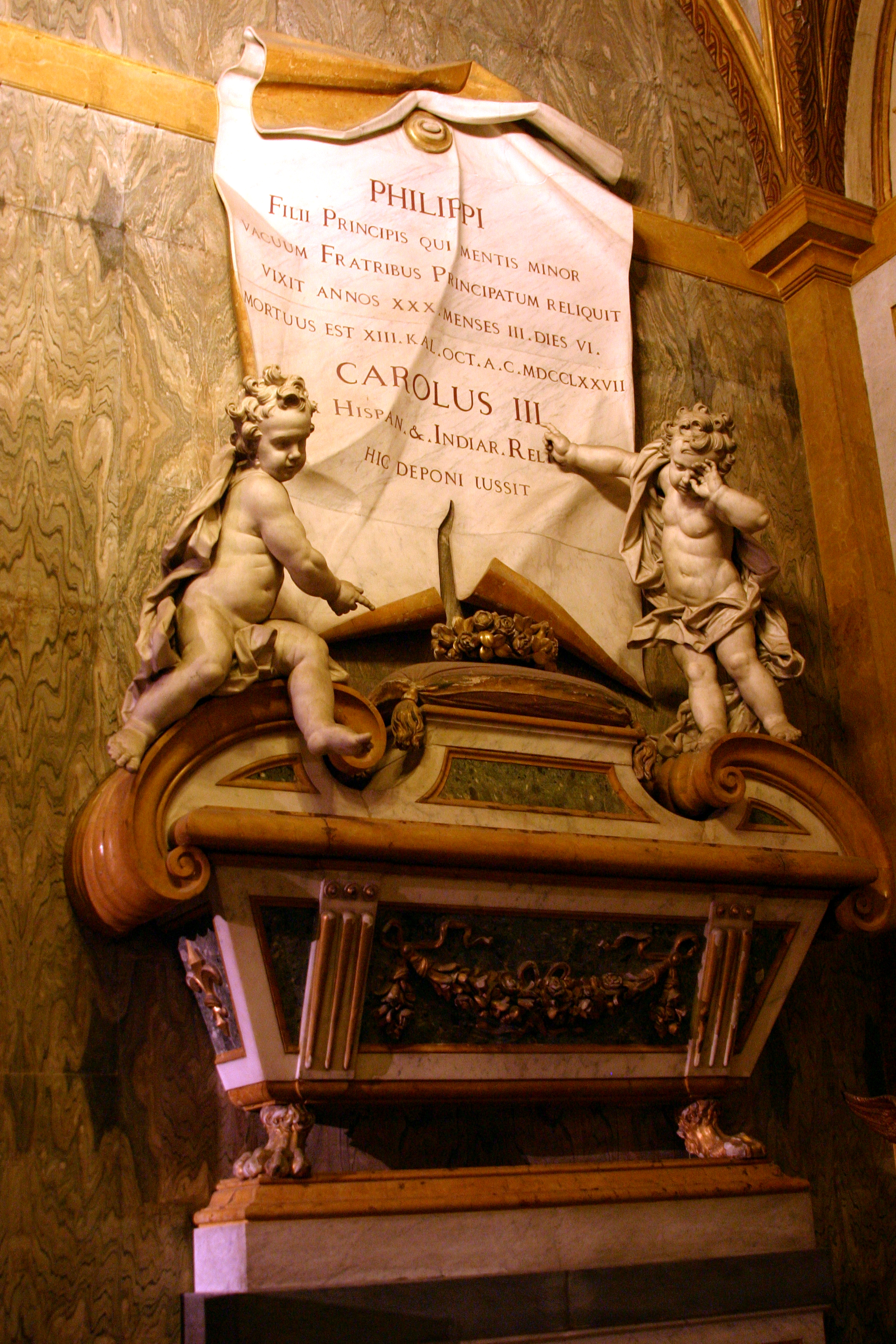
Philip's tomb in Basilica of Santa Chiara.

According to William Hamilton who was the British ambassador to the Kingdom of Naples, Infante Philip "was treated with certain distinctions, having chamberlains placed about him in constant attendance, who watched him with unremitting attention; as otherwise he would have committed a thousand excesses.

Care was particularly taken to keep him from having any connection with the other sex, for which he manifested the strongest propensity; but it became at last impossible to prevent him altogether from attempting to emancipate himself in this respect. He had many times eluded the vigilance of his keepers, and on seeing ladies pass through the portents of the place, would attack them with the same impetuosity as Pan or the Satyrs are described by Ovid, when pursuing the Nymphs; and with the same intentions. More than one lady of the Court was critically rescued from his embraces.

On particular days of the year, he was allowed to hold a sort of Court, when the Foreign ministers repaired to his apartments to pay their compliments to him. His greatest amusement consisted in having his hand held up by his attendants while gloves were put upon it, one larger than another to the number of fifteen or sixteen.

In September 1777, Infante Philip contracted smallpox. The King and Queen, fearing contagion, fled to Caserta. Philip died at the Palace of Portici in Naples at the age of 30. He was buried at the Basilica of Santa Chiara in Naples.

== Ancestry ==
Ancestors of Infante Felipe Antonio of Spain

8. Louis, Dauphin of France
4. Philip V of Spain
9. Maria Anna Victoria of Bavaria
2. Charles III of Spain
10. Odoardo Farnese, Hereditary Prince of Parma
5. Elisabeth Farnese
11. Dorothea Sophie of Neuburg
1. Infante Felipe Antonio of Spain
12. Augustus II of Poland
6. Augustus III of Poland
13. Christiane Eberhardine of Brandenburg-Bayreuth
3. Maria Amalia of Saxony
14. Joseph I, Holy Roman Emperor
7. Maria Josepha of Austria
15. Wilhelmine Amalie of Brunswick

== Notes ==
Infante Philip, Duke of Calabria House of Bourbon Born: 13 June 1747 Died: 19 September 1777
Regnal titles
Vacant Title last held by Vacant; Ferdinand II of Aragon	Duke of Calabria; 1747–1777	Incumbent; Heir: Ferdinand I of the Two Sicilies
