= Portrait of Joachim Murat =

1808 painting by François Gérard

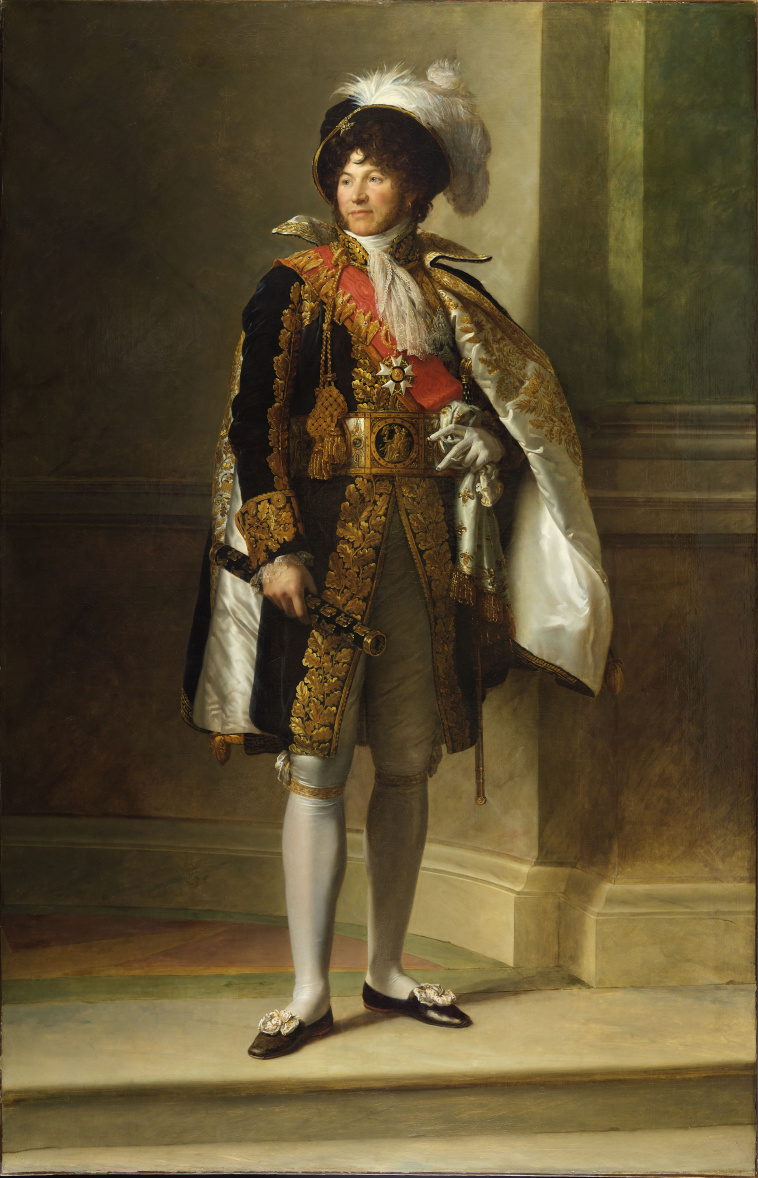
Portrait of Joachim Murat (1808) by François Gerard

Portrait of Joachim Murat is an oil-on-canvas painting created in 1808 by the French painter François Gérard. It depicts general Joachim Murat. It is held in Room 54 of the National Museum of Capodimonte, in Naples.

It shows Murat in the pose of Michelangelo's David and was commissioned by him after his accession to the throne of the Two Sicilies for the Palace of Portici. It is a replica of a painting commissioned for the Diana Gallery at the Tuileries Palace, later moved to the Palace of Versailles.
