= Royal Palace of Portici =

Coordinates: 40.8112°N 14.3427°E

- Reggia di Portici
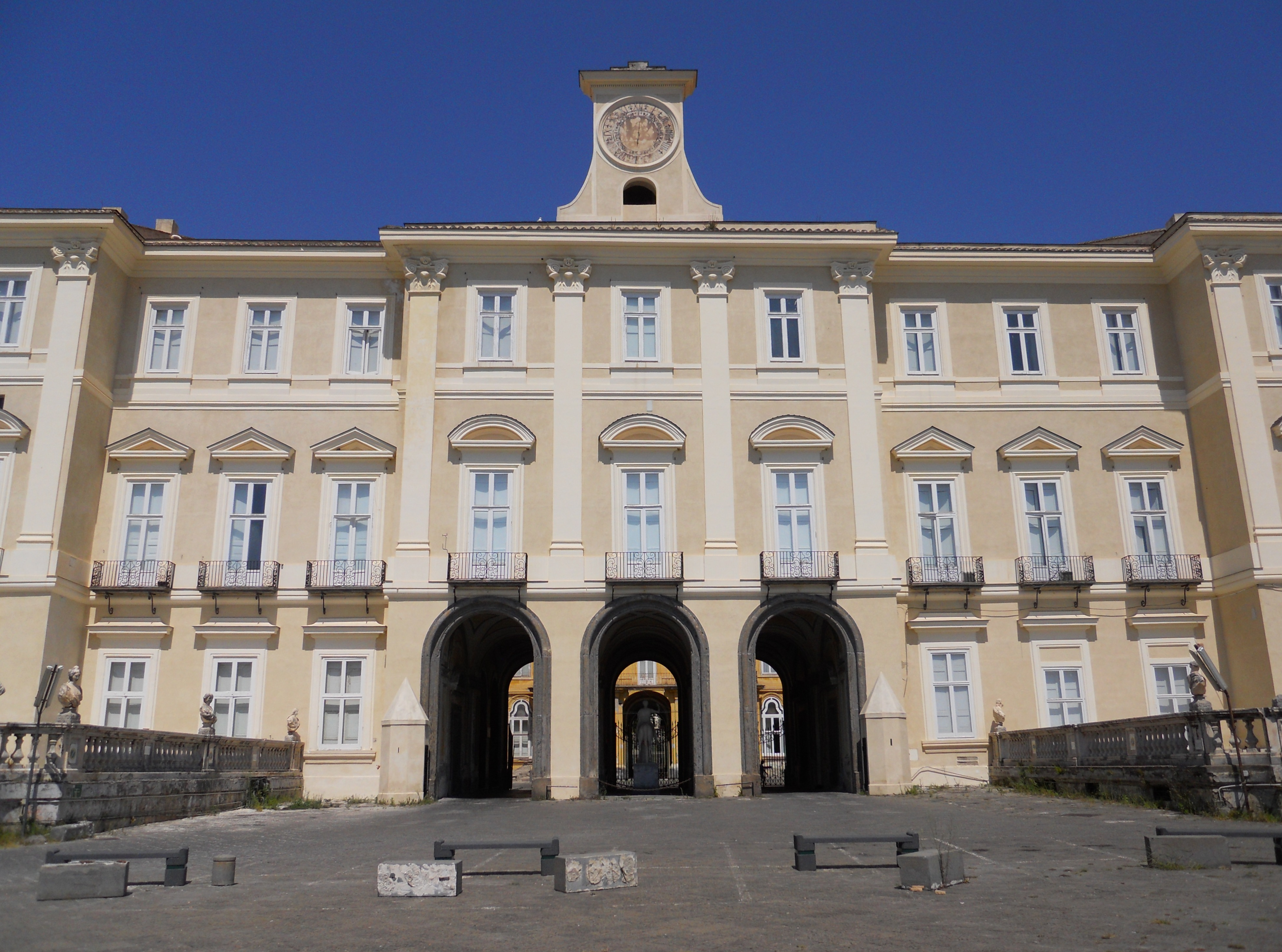
- Royal Palace of Portici façade
- Interactive map of the Royal Palace of Portici area
- Alternative names: Palazzo Reale di Portici

General information
- Status: now used as Faculty of Agriculture of University of Naples Federico II, museum and Botanic Garden
- Type: Palace
- Architectural style: Italian Baroque
- Location: Portici, Naples Italy, Via Università 100, 80055
- Current tenants: University of Naples Federico II
- Construction started: 1738
- Completed: 1742
- Client: Charles III of Spain

Technical details
- Floor count: 3

Design and construction
- Architects: Giovanni Antonio Medrano, Antonio Canevari, Giuseppe Bonito and Joseph Canart

Website
- Official website (in Italian)

The Royal Palace of Portici (Reggia di Portici or Palazzo Reale di Portici; Neapolitan: Reggia ‘e Puortece) is a former royal palace in Portici, Southeast of Naples along the coast, in the region of Campania, Italy. It now contains a museum complex (Musei della Reggia di Portici) which includes the royal apartments, the Herculanense Museum, the frescoed antechambers, the Chinese Room, the historical library, and the Orto Botanico di Portici, a botanical garden operated by the University of Naples Federico II. These gardens were once part of the large royal estate that included an English garden, a zoo and formal parterres.

It is located just a few hundred metres from the Roman ruins of Herculaneum and was the seat of the Accademia Ercolanese, established in 1758 by Charles VII of Naples (Charles III of Spain), which originally contained a collection of objects from the archaeological excavations at Herculaneum, Pompeii, and Stabiae, and housed restoration activities. The modern Herculanense Museum is a multimedia interpretation into the original museum.

== History ==
On 3 July 1735 at the age of 18, Infante Charles of Spain was crowned the King of Naples and Sicily. He had taken control of the two kingdoms by military force from Charles VI, Holy Roman Emperor. In 1738, Charles and his consort Maria Amalia of Saxony were favourably impressed with the area of Portici when they visited the villa of Emmanuel Maurice, the Duke of Elbeuf. The couple commissioned this palace in Portici to serve not only as a private residence, but as a place to receive foreign officials travelling to the kingdom.

Work began at the end of 1738 under the direction of Antonio Canevari. Canevari had helped the royal couple in construction of the Neapolitan Palace of Capodimonte. The interiors of the Palace of Portici were frescoed by Giuseppe Bonito, while the gardens were decorated with marble sculptures by Joseph Canart.

Portions of ancient Roman villas and noble residences were discovered in preparing the foundations of the palace, and excavation of the area revealed numerous works of art, among them temple with 24 marble columns. This discovery was put in the Museum of Portici, built for the occasion, and annexed to the Accademia Ercolanese. The museum was founded by Charles in 1755 also to house the findings from the excavations of Herculaneum.

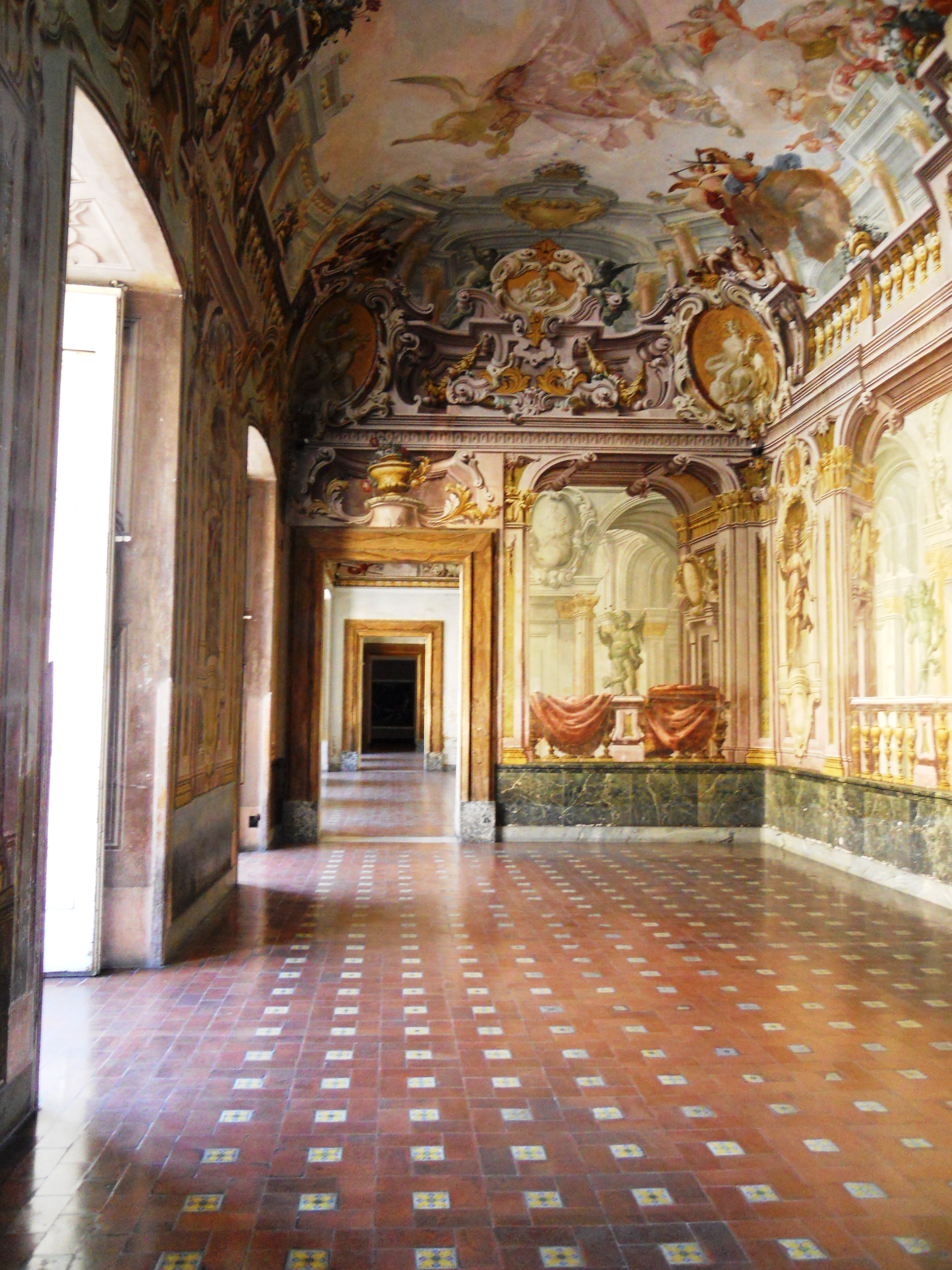
Salon with frescoes with quadratura.

Since the new royal palace was not large enough to house the whole court, it stimulated construction of other grand residences in the neighborhood, 122 of which are now known as the Vesuvian Villas. This also led to the expansion of the Palace of Capodimonte. Charles and his wife kept the Portici Palace as their summer residence and seven of their twelve children were born there.

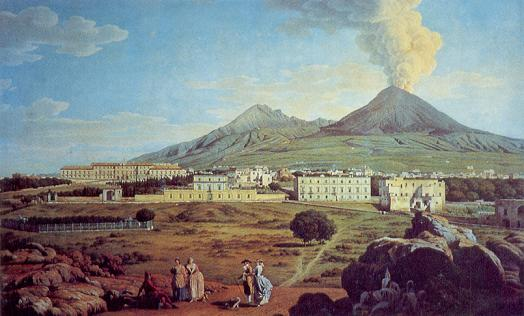
Palace of Portici on the right, c 1745.

Upon King Charles' accession to the Spanish throne in 1759, he left his Neapolitan and Sicilian domains to his third son, Ferdinand who would rule until his death in 1825. During the reign of Ferdinand, the palace was overshadowed by the far grander Caserta Palace which became the official home of the court from 1759. Portici was the private home of Infante Felipe, Duke of Calabria, the eldest son of Charles III of Spain. Prince Felipe was mentally disabled and lived in the palace until his death there on 19 September 1777.

In the spring of 1769, the palace hosted Joseph II, Holy Roman Emperor. In 1770, a fourteen-year-old Mozart stayed there. In 1799, King Ferdinand added an opera house to the palace. During the Napoleonic occupation, King Joachim Murat refurnished the palace with French furniture.

In 1804, the Queen Consort, Maria Isabella of Spain, gave birth here to her first child, Princess Luisa Carlotta. Luisa Carlota would marry her uncle, the Spanish Infante Francisco de Paula. On September 13, 1848, Queen Maria Isabella died at the palace aged 59.

In 1834, Corografia dell'Italia describes the Palazzo Portici, as being built by King Charles:

to increase the glory of the royal autumnal vacations, of which it formed the center. Towards 1750 it was used to store the collection of precious things that had been discovered in Herculaneum and in Pompeii. The building is on three floors, and is rectangular, 400 feet from east to west, and 360 feet wide. The principal prospect is of the sea; the large courtyard is octagonal, but has the singularity, or rather the disadvantage, of carrying the main thoroughfare that leads from Naples to Salerno, to Sannio, to Apulia and Calabria. Inside that big courtyard are the royal apartments, the sumptuous galleries that contained the fine museum, unique in the world, for the quantity of statues, bronzes, bas reliefs, pots, candelabras, and tools of every type found in the excavations of the above-mentioned two towns, and that today are part of the Bourbon Museum. What is seen however, and what is not found in other royal palaces, is that has floors composed of ancient Greek or Roman mosaics. The galleries however are not entirely devoted to precious objects; one also finds a fine collection of paintings of the Italian, French and Flemish schools. The gardens are at the east on the slopes of Vesuvius: they are immense, little adorned, but with many trees that are always green, especially service and arbutus trees, which feed the thrushes that abound there.

Today the palace accommodates the seat of the Faculty of Agriculture of the University of Naples Federico II.

Royal Children born at Portici
Name	Birth	Death	Notes
Children of the future Charles III of Spain (Real Alcázar de Madrid, Madrid, Kingdom of Spain, 20 January 1716 – Royal Palace of Madrid, Madrid, Kingdom of Spain, 14 December 1788) and his wife Princess Maria Amalia of Saxony born at the Palace of Portici (Zwinger Palace, Dresden; 24 November 1724 – Palace of Buen Retiro, Spain; 27 September 1760)
Princess Maria Isabel Antonietta de Padua Francisca Januaria Francisca de Paula Juana Nepomucena Josefina Onesifora of Naples and Sicily,	Palace of Portici, Portici, Modern Italy, 6 September 1740	Naples, 2 November 1742	died in childhood.
Princess Maria Josefa Antonietta of Spain of Naples and Sicily,	Palace of Portici, 20 January 1742	Naples, 1 April 1742	died in childhood.
Princess Maria Luisa of Naples and Sicily	Palace of Portici, 24 November 1745	Imperial Palace of the Hofburg, Vienna, 15 May 1792	married the future Leopold II, Holy Roman Emperor in 1764 and had issue.
Prince Felipe Antonio Genaro Pasquale Francesco de Paula of Naples and Sicily	Palace of Portici, 13 June 1747	Palace of Portici, 19 September 1777	Duke of Calabria; excluded from succession to the throne due to his imbecility
Prince Carlos Antonio Pascual Francisco Javier Juan Nepomuceno Jose Januario Serafin Diego of Naples and Sicily	Palace of Portici, 11 November 1748	Palazzo Barberini, Rome, 19 January 1819	future King of Spain; married Princess Maria Luisa of Parma and had issue.
Prince Gabriel Antonio Francisco Javier Juan Nepomuceno José Serafin Pascual Salvador of Naples and Sicily	Palace of Portici, 11 May 1752	Casita del Infante, Spain, 23 November 1788	married Infanta Mariana Vitória of Portugal, daughter of Maria I of Portugal; had three children two of which died young.
Princess Maria Ana of Naples and Sicily	Palace of Portici, 3 July 1754	Palace of Capodimonte, 11 May 1755	died in childhood.
Children of the future Francis I of the Two Sicilies (Naples, 14 August 1777 – Naples, 8 November 1830) and his wife Infanta Maria Isabella of Spain born at the Palace of Portici (Royal Palace of Madrid, 6 July 1789, Madrid – Palace of Portici, 13 September 1848)
Princess Luisa Carlota Maria Isabella of Naples and Sicily	Palace of Portici, Portici, 24 October 1804	Madrid, 29 January 1844	married her maternal uncle, Infante Francisco de Paula of Spain; had issue.

== Architecture ==
The chapel of the palace

The entrance presents a spacious and majestic façade terraced and equipped with balustrades; the center of the palace is a large quadrangle of which there are two gateways which allowed traffic to pass through; this thoroughfare was once called the Strada delle Calabrie or Road of Calabria. It is today called the via Università. The palace has two large parks: on the West overlooking the Gulf of Naples, and on the East looking towards Mount Vesuvius.

On the left side of the courtyard of the palace is the barracks of the Royal Guards (Caserma delle Guardie Reali) and the Palatine Chapel (Cappella Palatina of 1749), while a majestic salon (1741) leads from the vestibule to the first floor, where the apartment of Caroline Bonaparte is. The salon is richly decorated in Louis XIV style, and the boudoir of the Queen Maria Amalia of Saxony has walls decorated in porcelain of the Capodimonte Porcelain Factory which Maria Amalia helped found in 1743.

== Park ==
The palace's park, called Giardino della Regina, originally extended from Pugliano towards Vesuvius down to Granatello, towards the sea. It was divided into two parks, the lower having spacious avenues surrounding English gardens. It held works of art including the Fountain of the Sirens (Fontana delle Sirene), the Kiosk of King Carlo (Chiosco di Re Carlo) the Fountain of the Swans (Fontana dei Cigni), and an amphitheatre.

In the upper park was Charles's private zoo with kangaroos, an elephant, two lions, two panthers, four antelopes, an African lioness, a puma, two American tapirs and a porcupine. This novelty was kept by King Ferdinand who maintained that it was to remain on show to foreign dignitaries.

== Museum ==
The museum complex (Musei della Reggia di Portici) includes the royal apartments, the Herculanense Museum, the frescoed antechambers, the Chinese Room, the historical library, and the Orto Botanico di Portici. The indoor section opened to visitors on 12 April 2025. The rooms contain frescoes from the 18th and 19th century, inspired by the findings in Herculaneum.

From its establishment in 1758 to the beginning of the 19th century, the museum contained large numbers of artifacts from the excavations, and included restoration laboratories. Among other things, a technique of unrolling carbonized papyri was developed here. Goethe described it in 1787 as "the alpha and omega of all collections of antiquity". But with the flight of Ferdinando IV of Naples to Palermo, the collection fell apart, most of it being transferred to what is now the Museo Archeologico Nazionale in Naples. In 2006, the museum was reopened, and contains multimedia presentations on the history of the excavations, of restoration techniques, and of Charles and his court, as well as reproductions of frescoes and sculptures.

== See also ==
- List of Baroque residences
