= Infanta Josefa Fernanda of Spain =

Spanish infanta

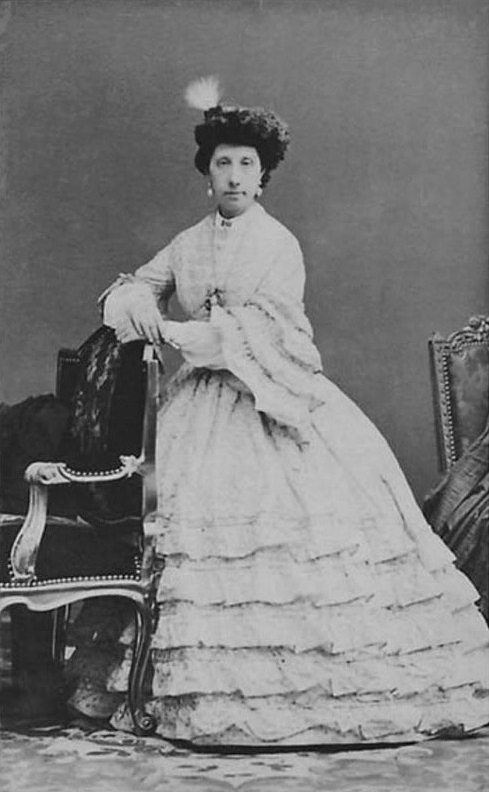
- Born: 25 May 1827; Aranjuez, Spain
- Died: 10 June 1910 (aged 83); Neuilly-sur-Seine, France
- Burial: Montmartre Cemetery
- Spouse: José Güell y Renté (m. 1848; died 1884)
- Issue: Raimundo Güell y de Borbón, 1st Marquis of Valcarlos; Fernando Güell y de Borbón, 1st Marquis of Güell; Francisco Güell y de Borbón
Names
- Josefina Fernanda de Borbón y Borbón
- House: Bourbon
- Father: Infante Francisco de Paula of Spain
- Mother: Princess Luisa Carlotta of the Two Sicilies

Infanta Josefa Fernanda of Spain (25 May 1827 – 10 June 1910) was an infanta of Spain, whom married morganatically to José Güell y Renté. She was the daughter of Infante Francisco de Paula and his first wife, Princess Luisa Carlotta of the Two Sicilies.

Josefa’s marriage to José Güell y Renté in 1848 caused Queen Isabella II of Spain to exile her. She returned to Spain in 1852 and was rehabilitated in 1855. Her husband made a political career and she herself was known as a supporter of the progressive forces during the Spanish Revolution of 1854.

== Biography ==
Born at the Royal Palace of Aranjuez in 1827, she was baptized the day after her birth. The Infanta was the daughter of Infante Francisco de Paula of Spain and his wife, Princess Luisa Carlotta of the Two Sicilies. Her paternal grandparents were King Charles IV of Spain and Maria Luisa of Parma, while her maternal grandparents were King Francis I of the Two Sicilies and María Isabella of Spain, who was herself a daughter of Charles IV. Josefina Fernanda's father was therefore the uncle of his own wife. Her godfather was her uncle, King Ferdinand VII of Spain. Among her siblings, the most notable was Francis, Duke of Cádiz, who became the king consort of his cousin, Isabella II of Spain.

Within her family, she was nicknamed "Pepita." Due to the rivalry between her mother and her mother's sister (and sister-in-law), Queen Regent Maria Christina of the Two Sicilies, the family was forced into exile for several years, living in Paris.

She secretly married José Güell y Renté on 4 June 1848. As a result of this marriage, she lost her status as an Infanta of Spain and both were banished from the Court.They spent four years in France, where she maintained relationships with both Baldomero Espartero and General Leopoldo O'Donnell, 1st Duke of Tetuán. General Narváez was the one who proposed to Queen Isabella II that she be stripped of her honors, which she eventually recovered in 1855 after being pardoned by the Queen.

Upon their return to Spain, they settled in Valladolid. Her husband unsuccessfully attempted to be elected as a deputy in 1851 and 1853. The Infanta played a prominent role in the progressive revolutionary movement of 1854; alongside General Atanasio Alesón, she succeeded in getting the military authorities of Valladolid to accept the triumph of the revolution. Her husband served in the constituent courts that same year.

The couple had three children:

- Raimundo Güell y de Borbón, Marquis of Valcarlos (Navarre, 1849 – Dammarie-lès-Lys, 1907), married Antonia Laura Alberti y Caro, with whom he had two daughters.
- Fernando Güell y de Borbón, Marquis of Güell (Valladolid, 1851 – Madrid, 1933), married his cousin María Josefa Alonso y Güell, with whom he had three children.
- Francisco Güell y de Borbón (Valladolid, 1853 – Paris, 1868), died in his adolescence.

King Alfonso XII restored her title of Infanta in 1883, but denied her the style of Royal Highness. She was widowed a year later.

She spent her final years in France, where she died having outlived all of her siblings. She was the last surviving grandchild of King Charles IV.

== Ancestry ==
Ancestors of Infanta Josefa Fernanda of Spain

8. Charles III of Spain
4. Charles IV of Spain
9. Maria Amalia of Saxony
2. Infante Francisco de Paula of Spain
10. Philip, Duke of Parma
5. Maria Luisa of Parma
11. Louise Élisabeth of France
1. Infanta Josefa Fernanda of Spain
12. Ferdinand I of the Two Sicilies
6. Francis I of the Two Sicilies
13. Maria Carolina of Austria
3. Princess Luisa Carlotta of the Two Sicilies
14. Charles IV of Spain (= 4)
7. Maria Isabella of Spain
15. Maria Luisa of Parma (= 5)

== Bibliography ==
- Iglesias Sancho, Jonatan; Mateos Sáinz de Medrano, Ricardo (2021). Las cuñadas de Isabel II, las infantas más raras que ha dado España (in Spanish). Madrid: Ediciones Insólitas. ISBN 978-8412103717.
