= Botanical Garden of Portici of the University of Naples Federico II =

Botanical garden in the University of Naples Federico II, Portici, Italy

Coordinates: 40.81178°N 14.34394°E

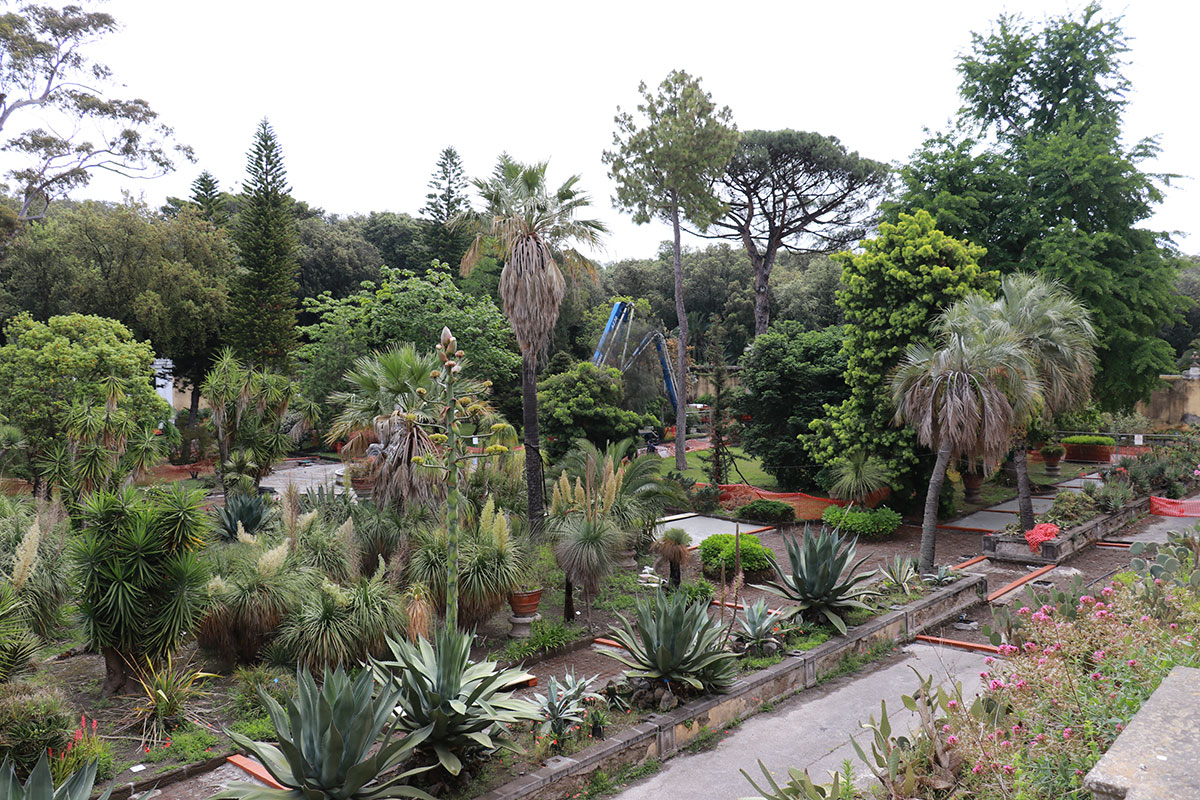
Viewof the Botanical Garden of Portici

The Orto Botanico di Portici (20,000 m^{2}), also known as the Orto Botanico della Facoltà di Agraria dell'Università di Napoli-Portici, is a botanical garden operated by the University of Naples Agriculture Department, and located at Via Università, 100 – 80055 Portici, Province of Naples, Campania, Italy. It is open weekday mornings, but reservations must be made in advance and an admission fee is charged.

The garden's site was formerly a Royal palace of Portici built 1738-1748 by Charles III of Spain, King of Naples and Sicily. After the Bourbons' departure in 1860, today's gardens were founded in 1872 with the Royal Higher School of Agriculture. The park was enlarged by a further 36 hectares at that time, and two ornamental gardens (about 9000 square meters) created, which were then transformed into botanical gardens by Nicola Antonio Pedicino, the school's first botany professor. In 1935 the school became part of the University of Naples, and subsequently occupied by allied troops during World War II, destroying many plants, but from 1948 its collections have been restored and enlarged.

The gardens currently contain over 4000 specimens representing about 1000 species. The most important collection are desert plants, which include over 600 species from Agavaceae, Aizoaceae, Cactaceae (about 400 species), Didiereaceae, and Euphorbiaceae. Of particular interest are the Gymnocalycium, Mammillaria, and Rhipsalis; Alluaudia, Aloe, and Kalanchoe from South Africa and Madagascar; and notable specimens of Welwitschia mirabilis from the South African desert. The garden also includes palms, ferns, conifers, carnivorous plants, and edible and medicinal plants, as well as a heated greenhouse for succulents (1000 m^{2}).

== See also ==
- List of botanical gardens in Italy
