= Princess Luisa Carlotta of the Two Sicilies =

Spanish Infanta

Luisa Carlotta
- Infanta of Spain
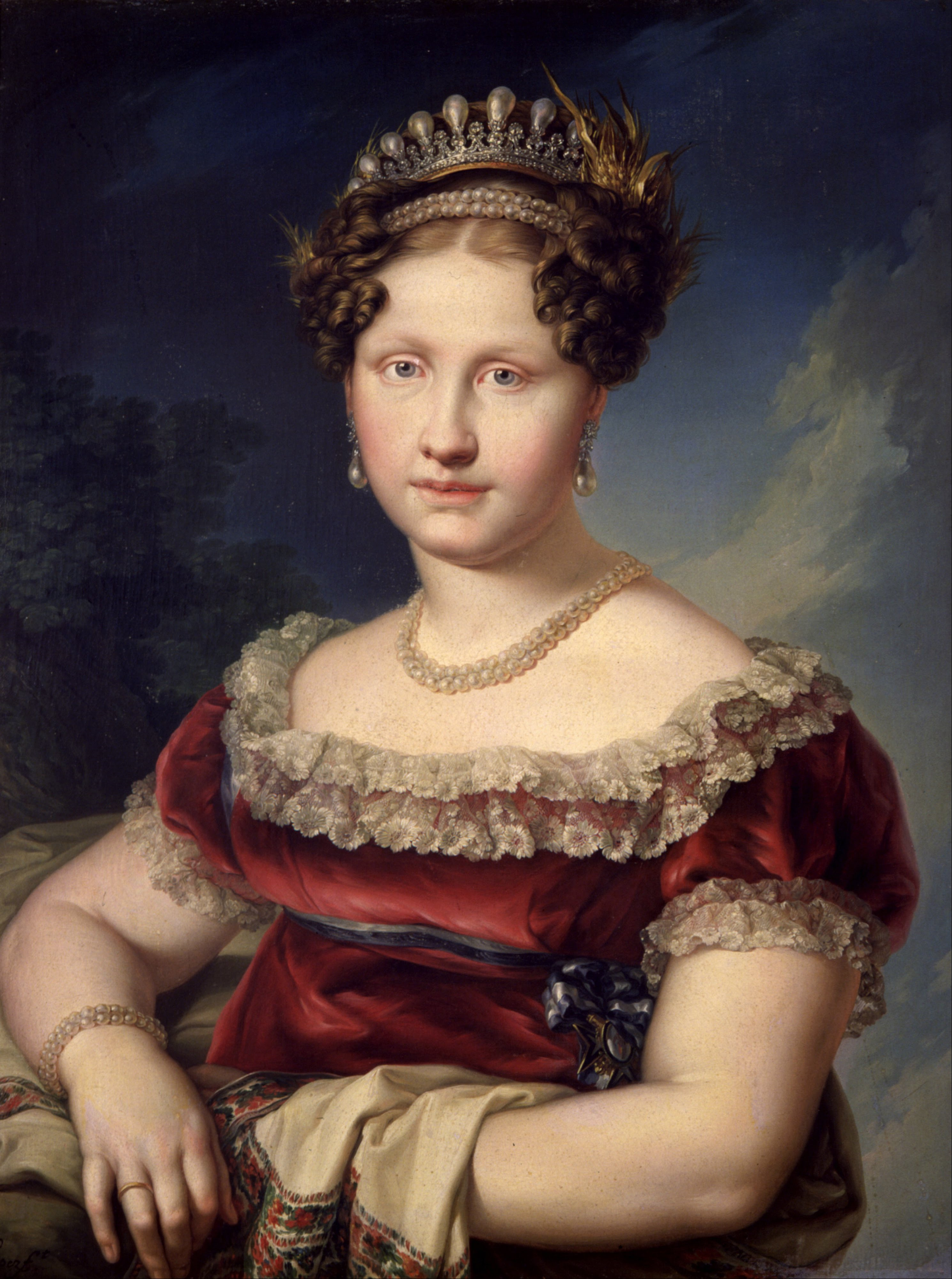
- Portrait by Vicente López Portaña, c. 1819
- Born: 24 October 1804; Palace of Portici, Naples
- Died: 29 January 1844 (aged 39); Madrid, Spain
- Burial: El Escorial
- Spouse: Infante Francisco de Paula of Spain (m. 1819)
- Issue: Isabel Fernanda, Countess Gurowska; Francis, King of Spain; Infante Enrique, Duke of Seville; Luisa Teresa, Duchess of Sessa; Infanta Josefina Fernanda; María Cristina, Infanta of Portugal; Amalia, Princess of Bavaria
Names
- Luisa Carlotta Maria Isabella
- House: Bourbon-Two Sicilies
- Father: Francis I of the Two Sicilies
- Mother: María Isabella of Spain

Luisa Carlotta of the Two Sicilies (Luisa Carlotta Maria Isabella; 24 October 1804 – 29 January 1844), was an Italian royal, who was an Infanta of Spain and a daughter of King Francis I of the Two Sicilies.

== Early life ==
Luisa Carlotta was born at the Palace of Portici, the eldest child of King Francis I from his second wife, Infanta María Isabella of Spain, who was only fifteen years old at the time of her birth. Her maternal grandparents were King Charles IV of Spain and Queen Maria Luisa of Spain. Luisa Carlotta had eleven younger siblings, including King Ferdinand II of the Two Sicilies.

== Infanta of Spain ==
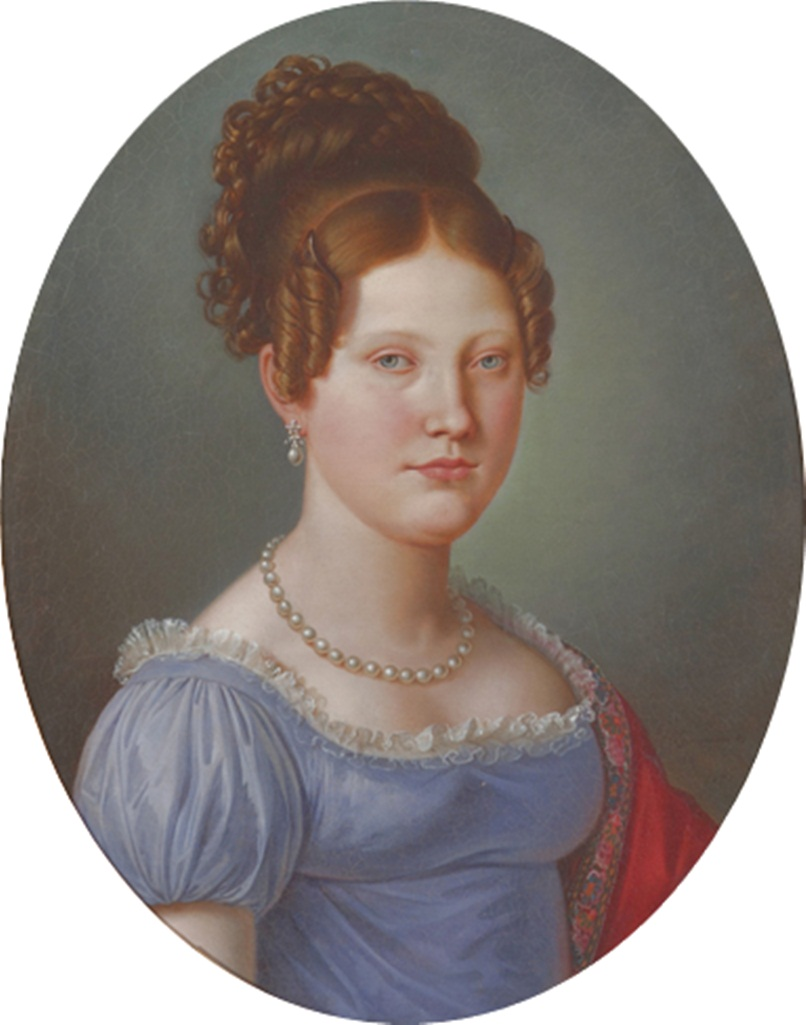
Portrait miniature of Princess Luisa Carlotta in 1820, by Giuseppe Cammarano

On 12 June 1819 in Madrid, 14-year-old Luisa Carlotta married her maternal uncle Infante Francisco de Paula of Spain. He was ten years older than Luisa Carlotta.

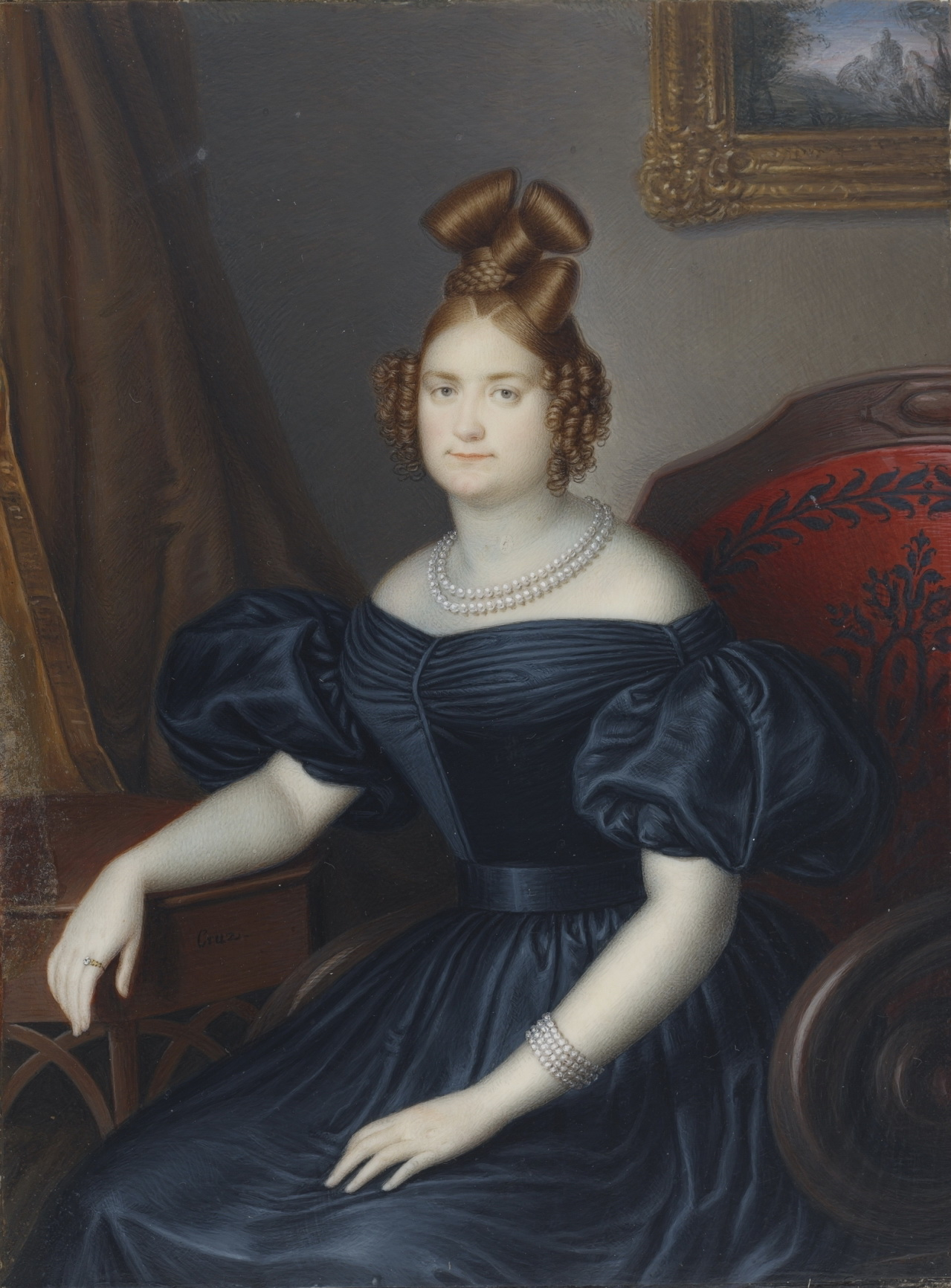
Portrait by Luis de la Cruz, 1830s

Luisa Carlotta played an important role during the sickness of Ferdinand VII to ensure that her niece, Isabella, became heiress to the Spanish throne instead of her uncle Carlos. She supported the new succession law issued by the king. When the king Ferdinand VII was suffering from a very severe gout attack that many feared would end his life (1832), a huge variety of characters, including the ambassador of Naples and her own confessor, harassed the Queen of Spain to persuade her to renounce the dynastic rights of her daughters in favor of Carlos, to avoid the horrors of a civil war. The queen crumbled under the pressures and got her husband to repeal the Pragmatic Sanction of 1830. This meant that the king's daughters would lose their right to the throne, in favor of the king's brother. When the Counsel of Castile, an organization that favored a transition towards constitutionalism, learned about this, they sent word to Luisa Carlotta who was famous for her determination and strong personality, in hopes that she could persuade the queen to change her mind again.

Luisa Carlotta rode nonstop after receiving the news and arrived to La Granja, unannounced, four days after the Pragmatic Sanction had been repealed. She went to find her sister who she criticized for her lack of resolve, calling her "regina di galleria". Afterwards she confronted prime minister Tadeo Calomarde. It is said that she was involved in an incident during the sickness of the Spanish monarch regarding this issue: when the Spanish king lay sick expecting death (1832), Luisa Carlotta tried by force to acquire a document forbidding female succession from prime minister Tadeo Calomarde and throw it on the fire. When Calomarde tried to save the document, she struck him in the face, upon which he uttered the well known words: "Madame, white hands don't offend!". Some authors, like Comellas, consider the slap an urban legend. Regardless, Luisa Carlotta was a formidable opponent to Calomarde in court.

When the king recovered, on 31 December 1832 he named his daughter heiress again, and gave the queen full regency powers. During the last months of Ferdinand's life, while Maria Cristina was regent, Luisa Carlotta stayed in the Spanish court and supported her sister in her governmental role. Carlotta was more active in government than her sister, to the point that first secretary Francisco Cea Bermúdez met with her more often than with the queen.

When her niece became queen in 1833 with her sister as regent, the friendship between the sisters turned into rivalry, and she left Spain for Paris. Luisa Carlotta died at Madrid at the age of 39.

== Issue ==
Coat of Arms of Princess Luisa Carlotta of Naples and Sicily, Infanta of Spain

She had eleven children:

- Francisco de Asís Luis (1820–1821); died in infancy,
- Isabel Fernanda (1821–1897); married Count Ignacy Gurowski.
- Francisco de Asís, Duke of Cádiz (1822–1902); married Isabella II of Spain
- Enrique, Duke of Seville (1823–1870)
- Luisa Teresa (1824–1900), married Don José María Osorio de Moscoso y Carvajal, Duke of Sessa
- Eduardo Felipe (1826–1830), died young
- Josefina Fernanda (1827–1910)
- María Teresa (1828–1829), died young
- Fernando María (1832–1854)
- María Cristina (1833–1902), married Prince Sebastian Gabriël de Bourbon, Infante of Spain and Portugal, great-grandson of King Charles III of Spain
- Amalia (1834–1905), married Prince Adalbert of Bavaria, youngest son of King Ludwig I of Bavaria.

== Ancestry ==
Ancestors of Princess Luisa Carlotta of the Two Sicilies

8. Charles III of Spain (= 12)
4. Ferdinand I of the Two Sicilies
9. Maria Amalia of Saxony (= 13)
2. Francis I of the Two Sicilies
10. Francis I, Holy Roman Emperor
5. Maria Carolina of Austria
11. Maria Theresa of Austria
1. Princess Luisa Carlotta of the Two Sicilies
12. Charles III of Spain (= 8)
6. Charles IV of Spain
13. Maria Amalia of Saxony (= 9)
3. Maria Isabella of Spain
14. Philip, Duke of Parma
7. Maria Luisa of Parma
15. Louise Élisabeth of France
