= Infanta Isabel Fernanda of Spain =

Spanish infanta

Infanta Isabel Fernanda
- Countess Gurowski
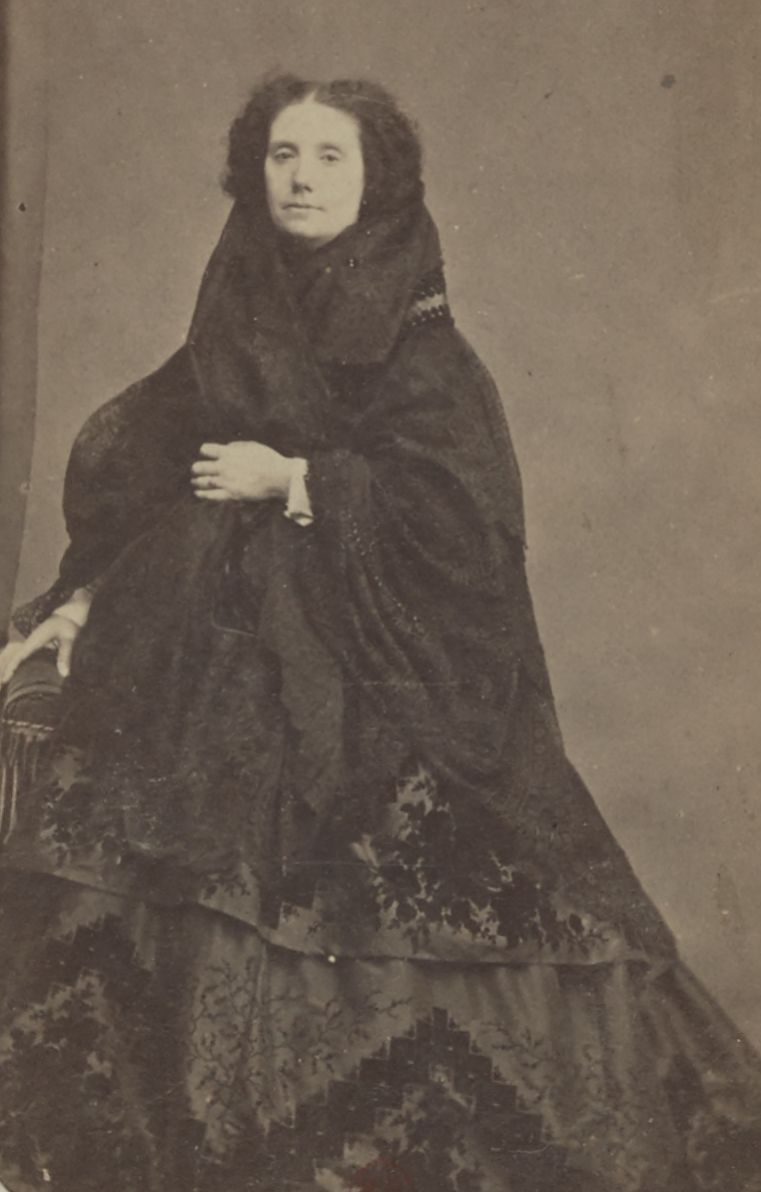
- Infanta Isabel Fernanda, c. 1860
- Born: 18 May 1821; Aranjuez, Spain
- Died: 8 May 1897 (aged 75); Paris, France
- Spouse: Count Ignatius Gurowski (m. 1841; died 1887)
- House: Bourbon
- Father: Infante Francisco de Paula of Spain
- Mother: Princess Luisa Carlotta of the Two Sicilies

Infanta Isabel Fernanda of Spain (18 May 1821 – 8 May 1897) was a Spanish princess and the eldest child of Infante Francisco de Paula of Spain and of his niece, Princess Luisa Carlotta of the Two Sicilies.

== Life ==
=== Childhood ===
Isabel Fernanda was born an infanta of Spain as a daughter of Infante Francisco de Paula and Princess Luisa Carlotta of the Two Sicilies. Once King Ferdinand VII of Spain died in 1833, his wife, Queen Maria Christina, the younger sister of Isabel’s mother Luisa, married discreetly to Agustín Fernando Muñoz y Sánchez—the reason behind the discreet behaviour of the marriage was due to the fact it was morganatic. The marriage, once it was known, caused a great rift between Maria Christina and her sister Luisa Carlotta; expressed by the queen sending Luisa and her family abroad to Paris. Isabel was educated in a schoolhouse, in Paris.

=== Marriage and scandal ===
In 1841 Isabel created a scandal when she married morganatically her riding instructor, Polish Count Ignatius Gurowski (1814-1887), son of Count Wladyslaw Gurowski, Starost of Kolo (d. 1818) and Genoveva Cielecka. They settled in Brussels, Belgium. When her brother married Queen Isabella II of Spain in 1846, the Belgian aristocracy and court were obliged to allow her to attend court and social life. When the Queen of the Belgians died in 1850, her rank made her the first lady of the Belgian court and thereby gave her a sort of hostess role until she returned to Spain in 1854.

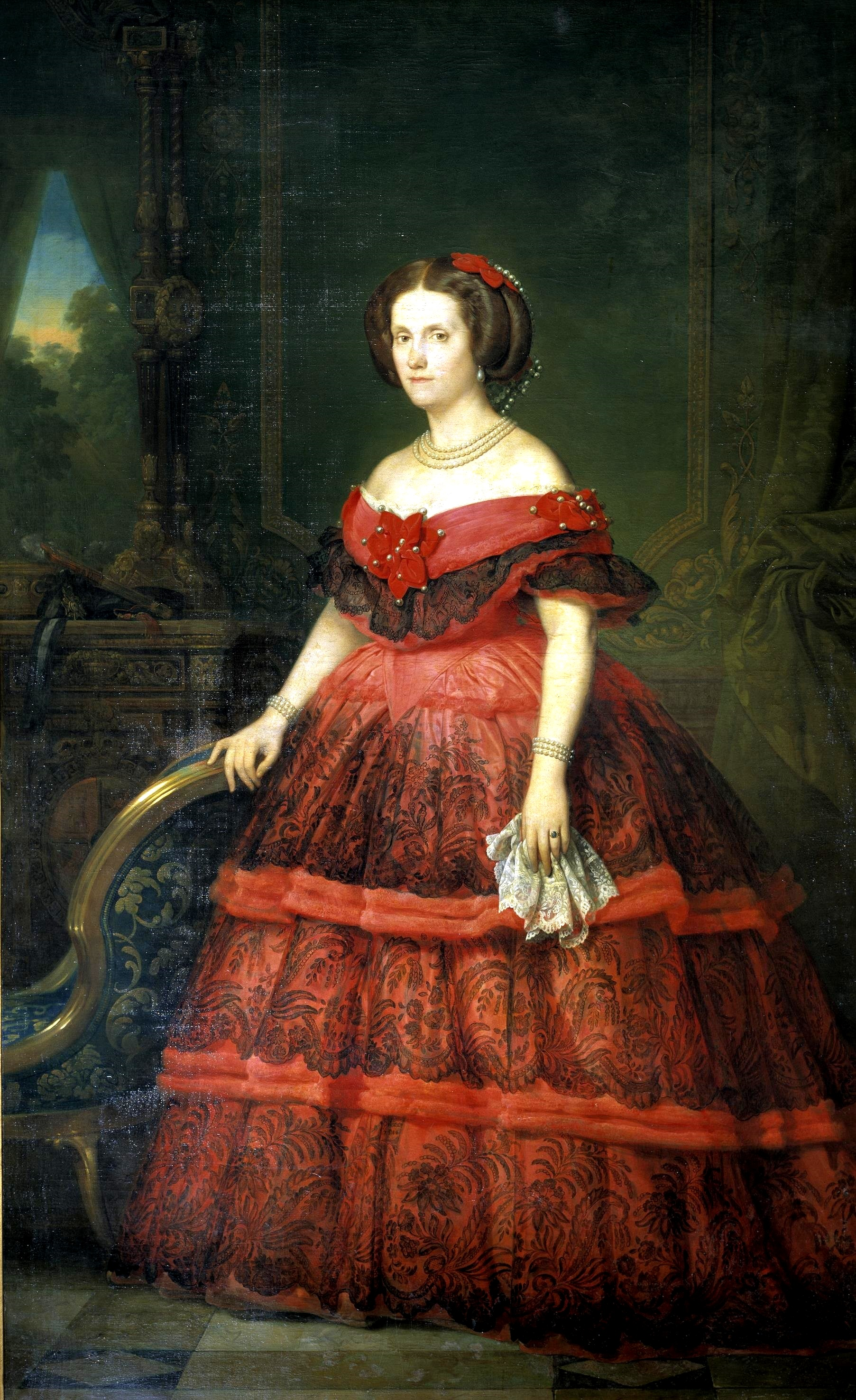
Portrait of Infanta Isabel, by Carlos Luis de Ribera y Fieve, c. 1860

Isabel Fernanda's coat of arms

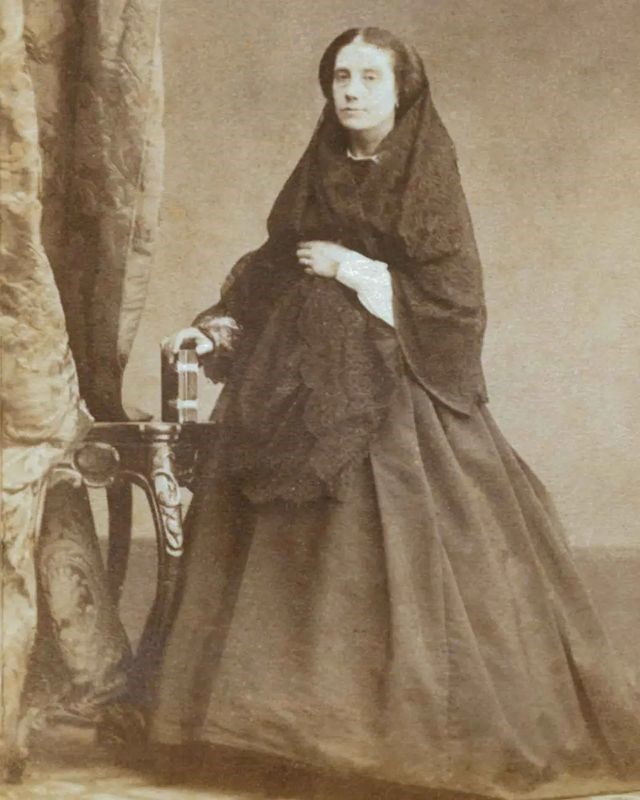
Photograph of Infanta Isabel

== Ancestry ==
Ancestors of Infanta Isabel Fernanda of Spain

8. Charles III of Spain
4. Charles IV of Spain (= 14)
9. Princess Maria Amalia of Saxony
2. Infante Francisco de Paula of Spain
10. Philip, Duke of Parma
5. Princess Maria Luisa of Parma (= 15)
11. Princess Louise Élisabeth of France
1. Infanta Isabel Fernanda of Spain
12. Ferdinand I of the Two Sicilies
6. Francis I of the Two Sicilies
13. Archduchess Maria Carolina of Austria
3. Princess Luisa Carlotta of the Two Sicilies
14. Charles IV of Spain (= 4)
7. Infanta María Isabella of Spain
15. Princess Maria Luisa of Parma (= 5)
