= Rossella Erra =

Italian economic advisor and television personality (born 1974)

- Born: 30 June 1974 (age 52); Portici, Naples, Italy
- Occupations: Economic advisor; television personality
- Spouse: Attilio Russo
- Children: 1

Rossella Erra (born 30 June 1974) is an Italian economic advisor and television personality. Since 2020, she has been on the opinion leader of Ballando con le Stelle (Dancing with the Stars).

== Life and career ==
Born in Portici in 1974, Erra took her degree in international economics and was an economic advisor. She started to participate in some television programs, but achieved wide popularity in 2020 as popular judge (tribuna del popolo) in that edition of Ballando con le Stelle. She has also appeared in several TV serials.

== Private life ==
Rossella Erra is married to Attilio Russo, with whom she has a daughter, Beatrice. She is Catholic.

== Selected television ==
- 2018 Vieni da me
- 2020 Ballando con le Stelle
- 2021 Detto fatto
- 2022 Il cantante mascherato
- 2022 Nei tuoi panni
- 2022 Ti sembra normale
- 2022 Domenica in
- 2023 Cartabianca
- 2023 È sempre Cartabianca
- 2023 La volta buona
- 2023 La vita in diretta
- 2023 BellaMa'
- 2023 Citofonare Rai 2
- 2024 È sempre Cartabianca
- 2024 La volta buona
- 2024 La vita in diretta
- 2024 Generation Z
- 2024 Citofonare Rai 2
- 2024 Storie di Donne al Bivio
- 2024 Domenica in
