= Portici =

Portici Puortece (Neapolitan)
- Comune
- Comune di Portici
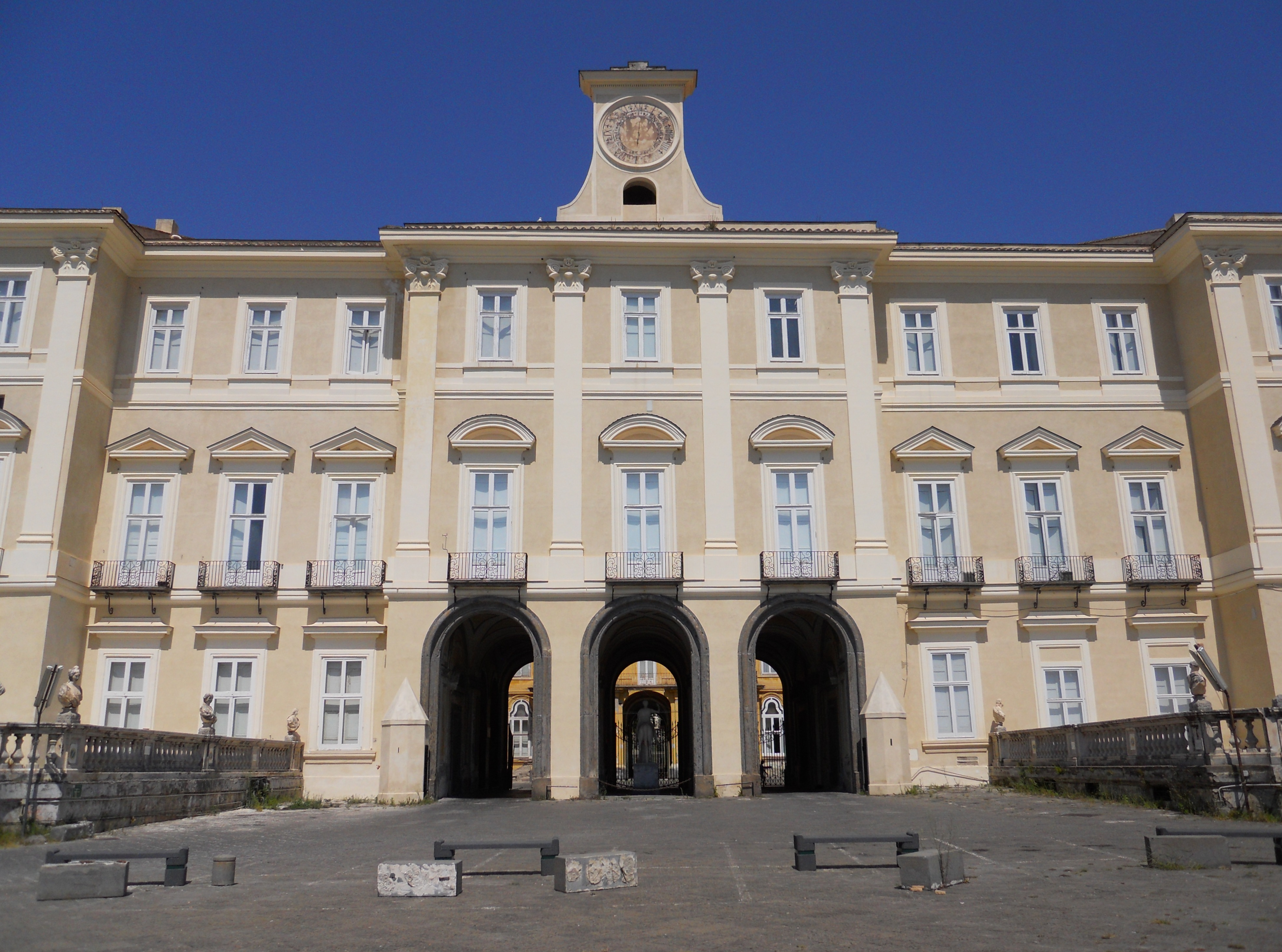
- Royal Palace of Portici

- Coat of arms

- Location within Italy Location within Campania
- Coordinates: 40°49′11″N 14°20′28″E
- Country: Italy
- Region: Campania
- Metropolitan city: Naples (NA)
- Frazioni: Bellavista

Government
  - Mayor: Vincenzo Cuomo

Area
  - Total: 4.60 km^{2} (1.78 sq mi)
- Elevation: 29 m (95 ft)

Population (2026)
  - Total: 51,213
  - Density: 11,100/km^{2} (28,800/sq mi)
- Demonym: Porticesi
- Time zone: UTC+1 (CET)
  - Summer (DST): UTC+2 (CEST)
- Postal code: 80055, 80052
- Dialing code: 081
- Patron saint: Cyrus
- Saint day: 31 January
- Website: Official website

Portici (Italian: [ˈpɔrtitʃi]; Neapolitan: Puortece [ˈpwortə(t)ʃə]) is a city and comune (municipality) of the Metropolitan City of Naples in the region of Campania in southern Italy. It has 51,213 inhabitants.

== History ==
The city was completely destroyed by the 1631 eruption of Mount Vesuvius, but was rebuilt. Charles III of Spain, King of Naples and Sicily, built a royal palace in the town between 1738 and 1748.

Pope Pius IX took refuge in Portici in 1849-50 after staying for a period in Gaeta, further north. He returned from Portici to Rome on 12 April 1850.

After Garibaldi's Expedition of the Thousand in 1860, when he defeated the Bourbons, the palace became the Portici botanic gardens and the Royal Higher School of Agriculture. It once contained the antiquities from Herculaneum, which have since been moved to Naples.

== Geography ==
Portici lies at the foot of Mount Vesuvius on the Bay of Naples, about 8 km (5.0 mi) southeast of Naples itself. There is a small port. To the south east is Ercolano, formerly Resina, which occupies the site of ancient Herculaneum. San Giorgio a Cremano is another town nearby.

== Demographics ==
As of 2026, the population is 51,213, of which 47.1% are male, and 52.9% are female. Minors make up 15.0% of the population, and seniors make up 25.2%.

Historical population

Year	Pop.	±%
1861	10,050	—
1871	11,300	+12.4%
1881	12,437	+10.1%
1901	14,239	+14.5%
1911	16,965	+19.1%
1921	21,422	+26.3%
1931	24,345	+13.6%
1936	26,049	+7.0%

Year	Pop.	±%
1951	35,325	+35.6%
1961	50,373	+42.6%
1971	75,897	+50.7%
1981	80,410	+5.9%
1991	68,980	−14.2%
2001	60,218	−12.7%
2011	55,765	−7.4%
2021	52,500	−5.9%

Source: ISTAT

=== Immigration ===
As of 2025, immigrants make up 2.4% of the population. The 5 largest foreign countries of birth are Ukraine, Russia, Germany, Romania, and Brazil.

== Economy ==
The inhabitants were historically engaged in fishing, silk-growing and silk-weaving up to the beginning of the 20th century. Later a more diversified economy emerged, with industry and trade as main pillars.

Vincenzo Cuomo is the mayor. In 2009, he banned shops from displaying Christmas decorations because shopkeepers were subject to extortion to buy Camorra (mob) sold decorations.

In March 2008, Boeing opened a research centre for advanced materials under an agreement with the Italian aerospace company Alenia.

The city has been for long time an area with a strong Camorra presence to the point that a Liberty-style villa located in the historic city centre was formerly used as a residence by a leading figure of local organised crime, before being seized by judicial authorities.

== Notable people ==
- Charles IV of Spain (1748–1819), King of Spain
- Enzo Decaro (1958), actor
- Rossella Erra (1974), television personality
