= Infante Francisco de Paula of Spain =

Spanish infante (1794–1865)

Infante Francisco de Paula
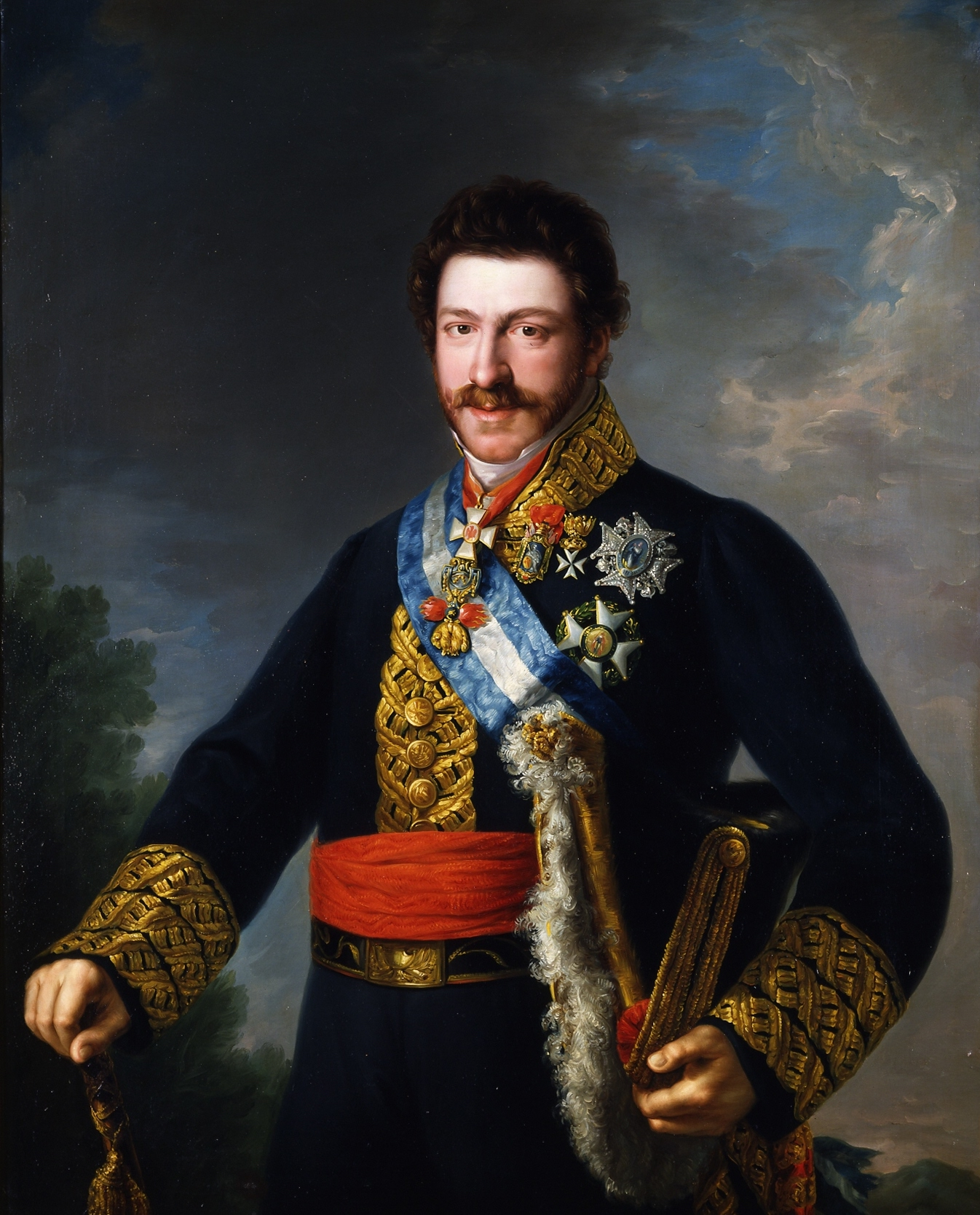
- Portrait by Bernardo López Piquer
- Born: 10 March 1794; Aranjuez, Spain
- Died: 13 August 1865 (aged 71); Madrid, Spain
- Burial: El Escorial
- Spouses: Princess Luisa Carlotta of the Two Sicilies (m. 1819; died 1844) Teresa Arredondo y Ramírez de Arellano (m. 1852; died 1863)
- Issue Detail: Isabel Fernanda, Countess Gurowska; Francisco de Asís, King of Spain; Enrique, Duke of Seville; Luisa Teresa, Duchess of Sessa; Josefa Fernanda, Mrs. Güell; María Cristina, Infanta of Portugal and Spain; Amalia, Princess of Bavaria
Names
- Spanish: Francisco de Paula Antonio de Borbón y Borbón-Parma
- House: Bourbon-Anjou
- Father: Charles IV of Spain
- Mother: Maria Luisa of Parma

Infante Francisco de Paula of Spain (10 March 1794 – 13 August 1865) was an infante of Spain and the youngest son of Charles IV of Spain and Maria Luisa of Parma. He was the brother of Ferdinand VII and the uncle and father-in-law of Isabella II.

His education at the Spanish court was derailed by the Napoleonic intervention in Spain. The departure of the 14-year-old Infante to exile in May 1808 provoked a popular uprising that was violently suppressed by French troops. For the next ten years, Infante Francisco de Paula lived in exile with his parents, first in Marseille and later in Rome.

Infante Francisco de Paula returned to Spain in 1818, being called by his eldest brother, King Ferdinand VII, who showered him with honors and privileges. Interested in artistic pursuits, Francisco was an amateur singer and painter. In 1819, he married his niece, Princess Luisa Carlotta of the Two Sicilies, the eldest daughter of his older sister María Isabel. The couple had eleven children and were very active in political affairs. Luisa Carlotta was instrumental in securing the succession for Ferdinand VII's daughter, Queen Isabella II.

During the regency of Isabella II, Francisco was excluded from the government by his sister-in-law, Queen Maria Christina. Siding with the liberals, Francisco de Paula and his wife became active in the opposition and were forced to move to France in 1838. They returned to Spain under the government of Maria Christina's successor as regent, General Baldomero Espartero. As they also conspired against Espartero, they were sent back into exile.

The proclamation of Queen Isabella II's majority allowed them to return. The Infante and his wife centered their hopes on marrying their eldest son, Infante Francisco de Asis, to Queen Isabella II. Luisa Carlotta died in 1844, but, under pressure from French diplomacy, Queen Isabella II married Francisco de Asis in October 1846. As the father-in-law of his niece the Queen, Infante Francisco de Paula occupied a prominent position at court during Isabella II's reign. However, as he tried to intervene in politics, he was briefly exiled once again in 1849. In 1852, with the Queen's approval, he contracted a morganatic marriage. He died almost 12 years later in 1865.

== Early life ==
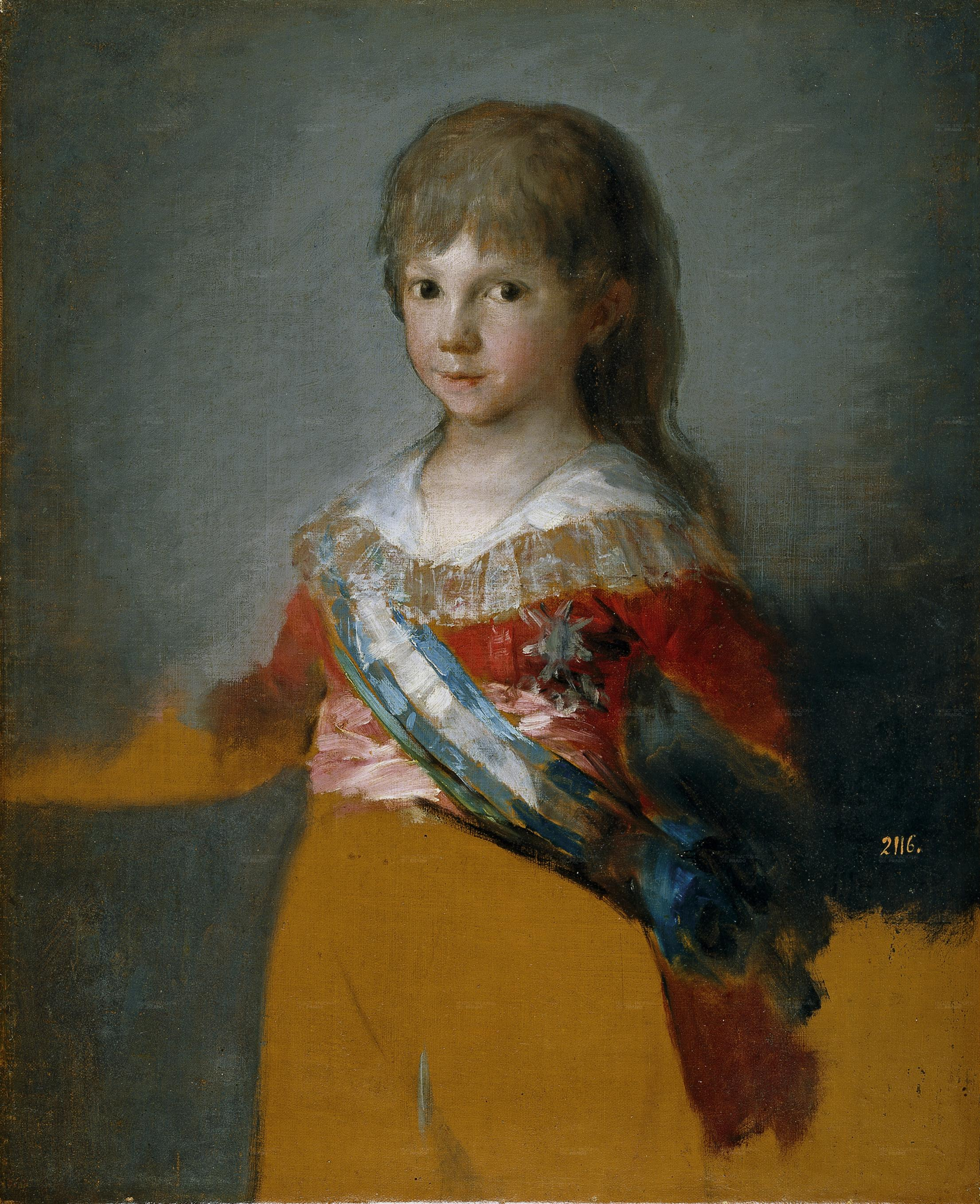
Infante Francisco de Paula by Francisco de Goya

Born on 10 March 1794 at the Royal Palace of Aranjuez, Infante Francisco de Paula was the fourteenth child of King Charles IV of Spain (1748–1819) and his wife Maria Luisa of Parma (1751–1819), a granddaughter of King Louis XV of France. He received the names Francisco de Paula Antonio Maria. His parents had married twenty-nine years earlier and Francisco de Paula was the couple's last child. As the youngest in a large family, he was his mother's favorite. His father, King Carlos IV, had a passion for hunting and collecting clocks, but little interest in political affairs. He took a passive role in the direction of his own kingdom, leaving the government to his wife and to his prime minister, Manuel Godoy. Queen Maria Luisa thoroughly dominated the King. Lacking the political acumen necessary to hold power on her own, Maria Luisa deposited her trust and the rule of government on Godoy, whom she raised to prominence. Court rumors attributed the paternity of Francisco de Paula and his sister María Isabel, not to the King, but to Godoy. However, recent biographers and historians have found these claims to be both unproven and unlikely.

As a child, Francisco de Paula had blond hair, brown eyes and a tender expression. In the spring 1800, at the age of six, he was painted with his family by Francisco Goya in the portrait Charles IV of Spain and His Family.

Francisco de Paula's education was different from the one provided to his two eldest brothers Ferdinand, Prince of Asturias and Infante Don Carlos. The plan of studies assigned to him was inspired by the pedagogical theories of Johann Heinrich Pestalozzi. Trying to implement this system of education throughout Spain, Godoy convinced the royal couple to apply it to their youngest son. Although his parents intended Francisco de Paula to pursue a career in the Spanish Navy, the Infante's education was abruptly interrupted by the Napoleonic intervention in Spain.

With the pretext of solving the differences between Charles IV and his eldest son, Ferdinand VII, who took over the government after the Mutiny of Aranjuez, Napoleon invited father and son to a meeting in Bayonne, France, pressing them both to renounce the Spanish crown and give it to him. After achieving his objective, Napoleon gave Spain to his brother Joseph Bonaparte and ordered the remaining members of the Spanish royal family out of the country.

While his parents and eldest brothers were at the conference in Bayonne with Napoleon, Francisco de Paula, then fourteen years old, was left behind at the Royal Palace of Madrid with his sister, the deposed Queen of Etruria, and her children. On 2 May 1808, at the departure of the Infante, the last remaining male member of royal family on Spanish soil, a crowd gathered in front of the Royal Palace in an attempt to prevent his removal. The appearance of Francisco de Paula, pale and overcome by emotion, touched the crowd. Poorly armed, the population confronted the French troops. The spontaneous popular uprising against the French invaders spread throughout Madrid, but the French General Joachim Murat brutally crushed the rebellion.

== Exile ==
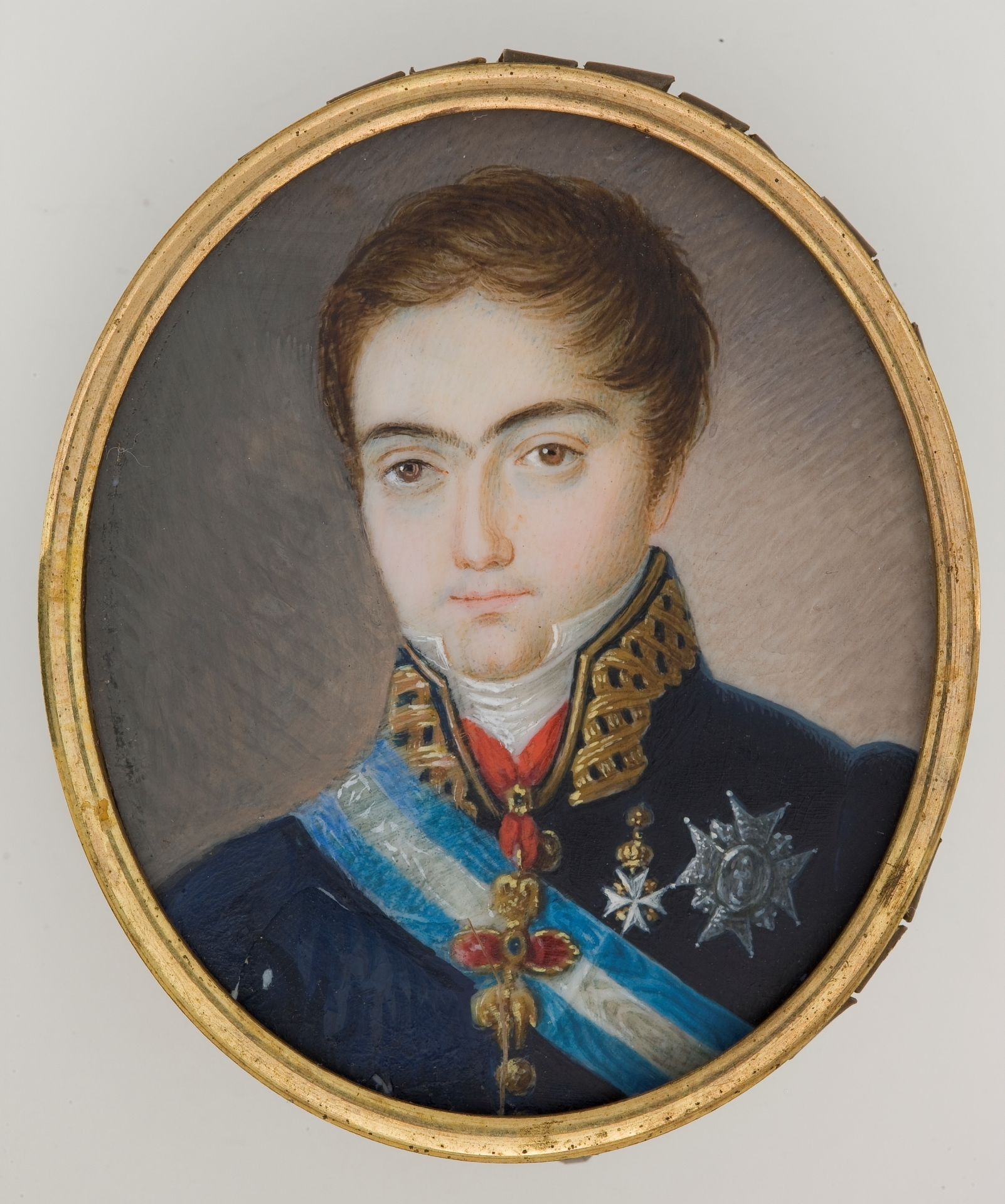
Infante Francisco de Paula in his teens

For the next six years all the members of the Spanish royal family lived in exile. Ferdinand VII, his brother Infante Don Carlos and their uncle, old Infante Don Antonio, were confined under close surveillance at the Château de Valençay. Francisco de Paula, still a teenager, was the only child allowed to accompany his parents in exile in France.

King Charles IV, the Queen and Infante Francisco de Paula, always followed by Godoy, were installed at the Château de Compiègne to the north-east of Paris. Looking for a warmer climate, they moved to Marseille in October 1808. They spent the next four years there, under increasingly strained circumstances. The Infante's sister, the former Queen of Etruria, was imprisoned in a convent in Rome by Napoleon. In order to be closer to her – and with fond memories of their early years in Naples and Parma – Francisco de Paula's parents moved with him to Rome in July 1812. They settled at Palazzo Borghese. During the Hundred Days, following Napoleon's escape from Elba, Murat, who had been King of Naples since 1808, marched on Rome in the Emperor's name. The family fled to Verona. After Napoleon's final defeat, the Spanish royal party returned to Rome, moving to Palazzo Barberini.

While in exile, Francisco de Paula's education was neglected. Godoy, who shared the same household with the deposed royal family, gave him some classes. In Rome, Francisco de Paula's parents tried to lead him to a career in the Church. He received minor orders, wore religious garments daily and the Pope offered to make him cardinal. However Francisco de Paula had no real inclination for clerical life. With no sibling near his age, Francisco's constant companion was Godoy's daughter, Carlota de Godoy Borbon, Duchess of Sueca. In 1814 Francisco de Paula was twenty years old and Carlota was fourteen. As they were fond of each other, Queen Maria Luisa wished them to marry. Francisco de Paula was reluctant. Unhappy with Godoy's overwhelming presence and the corruption around him, the Infante wrote to his brother the King, asking him to be permitted to renounce his religious orders, and be allowed to follow a career in the Spanish Army instead. Ferdinand VII, restored to the Spanish throne after Napoleon's fall, called his brother back to Spain in order to frustrate the prospect of a wedding with Godoy's daughter. By August 1816, both Charles IV and Queen Maria Luisa allowed their youngest son to leave as his behaviour in Rome had created concern.

The Infante left Rome on 22 November 1816. While in Lyon on his way to Spain, he became entangled in a scandal that derailed the trip. It was discovered that he had taken as lover the mistress of one of his servants, who took financial advantage of the situation. The Infante asked for forgiveness. Ferdinand VII pardoned his brother but delayed his return to Madrid, ordering him to travel around the European courts. For the next seventeen months the Infante visited Paris, Brussels, Amsterdam, Frankfurt, Berlin, Weimar, Leipzig, Dresden, Prague, and Vienna. There were plans to marry him to a Princess of Saxony. In December 1817, Carlos IV proposed to marry Francisco to one of the twin daughters of King Maximilian I Joseph of Bavaria. Neither of these two projects came to fruition. The Infante wanted to marry his niece, Princess Maria Luisa Carlota of Parma, then fourteen years old. However, the princess's mother, Maria Luisa (the former Queen of Etruria), opposed the union, considering her twenty-two-year-old brother too reckless for her young daughter. In March 1818, Ferdinand VII, pressed by his wife Maria Isabel of Braganza, finally ordered his brother to return to Spain.

== Honours and privileges ==
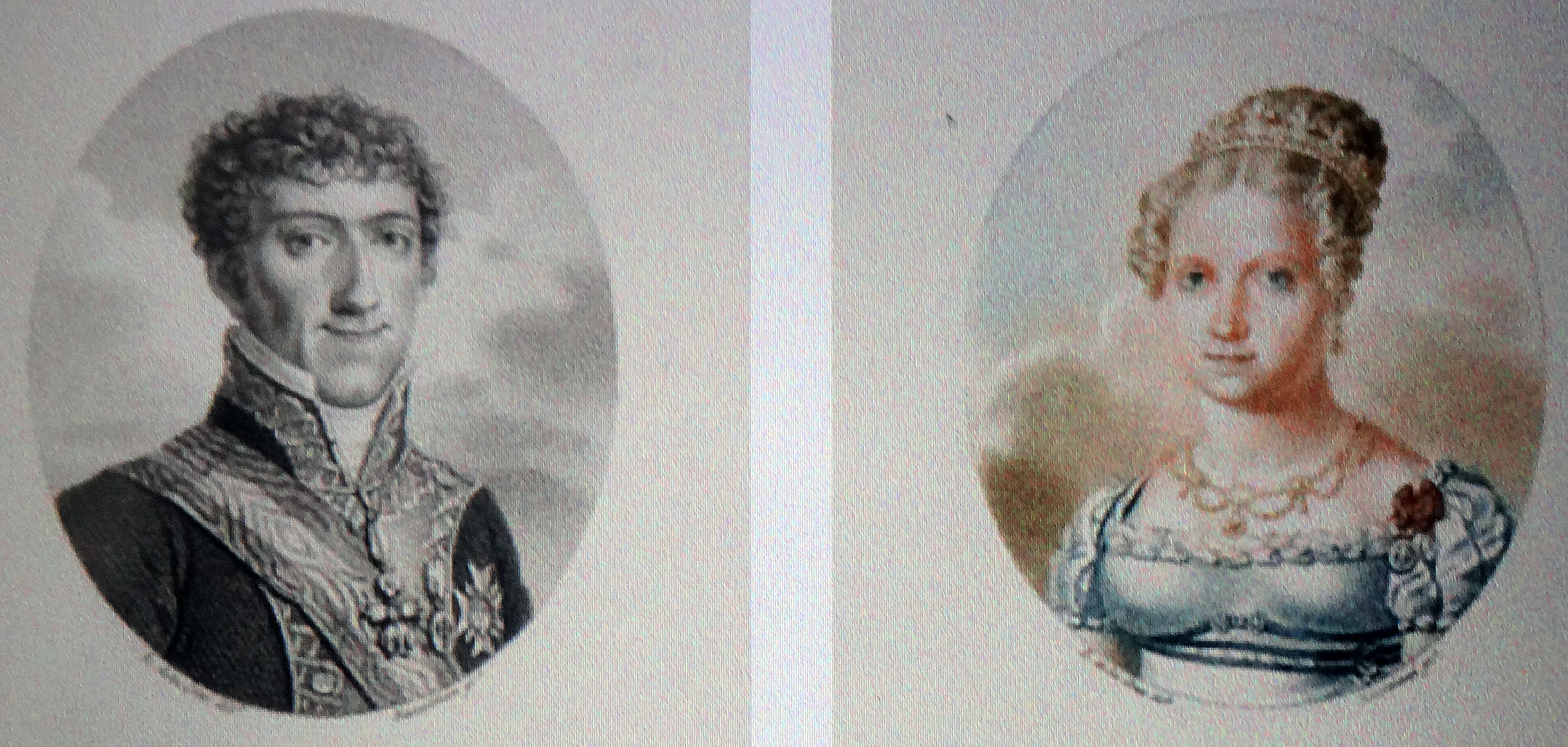
Infante Francisco de Paula and Princess Luisa Carlotta of the Two Sicilies

Infante Francisco de Paula returned to Spain in April 1818. Ferdinand VII did not allow his brother a position of command in the Spanish Army as Francisco had wished, but otherwise showered him with honors and privileges. The Infante was made a Knight of the orders of Santiago, Calatrava, Alcántara and Montesa, as well as being given the control and income of some of the large properties these orders held in Spain. He also became a senior knight of the Order of St John of Jerusalem which brought similar benefits. He received the French Order of the Holy Spirit and was made an honorary member of the Royal Academy of Fine Arts of San Fernando.

As Infante Francisco settled in the Royal Palace, his father, Charles IV, shortly before his death, negotiated Francisco's marriage to Princess Luisa Carlotta of the Two Sicilies. This was with the consent of Ferdinand VII. Luisa Carlotta was the eldest daughter of Francis I of the Two Sicilies and María Isabel of Spain, Infante Francisco's sister. This was a union between uncle and niece. The couple married by proxy on 15 April 1819. On 14 May, Luisa Carlotta arrived in Barcelona. The ceremonial wedding took place on 9 June 1819 at the Royal Palace of Madrid. Francisco de Paula was twenty-five years old; Luisa Carlotta was only fifteen. She was lively, witty, strong willed, hot tempered and ambitious. Luisa Carlotta quickly dominated her husband, won the King's heart, and began to produce children who were granted the rank and status of Infantes of Spain. Between 1820 and 1834 the couple had eleven children. The family lived in a wing of the royal palace of Madrid and also spent periods of time at the palaces of la Granja, Aranjuez and Sevilla.

The position of Francisco de Paula and his wife at court was, however, a modest one. The Infante was only fifth in the line of succession—after his brother Don Carlos and Don Carlos's three sons. Hoping to have descendants, Ferdinand VII, who had no children from his first two wives, married for a third time four months after Francisco's wedding. During the 1820s Spain was a country in constant political turmoil, facing economic hardships. The economy had been devastated in the war of independence from France and by the loss of the Spanish colonies in the continental Americas. A revolution in 1820 imposed on Ferdinand VII the liberal constitution of 1812, which he had previously repudiated. This period lasted for three years. In 1823, with the approval of Britain, France, Russia, Prussia, and Austria, a French army invaded Spain and reinstated the King's absolute power. Constant political tensions between liberals and conservatives, who had the upper hand, continued. In this political struggle, Francisco de Paula, grateful, loyal and subservient to his brother the King, supported Ferdinand VII's conservative policies. However, as the Infante's political views were moderate, the ultra-royalist party at court viewed him as a liberal.

With a placid personality, Infante Francisco de Paula was more interested in art than in politics. The Infante, who in his childhood had received drawing lessons from the court painter and miniaturist Antonio Carnicero, was himself an amateur painter. Some of his works, including an oil painting of Saint Jerome, have survived. The Infante's main passion was music. Until he was forced to leave Spain for exile in 1808, he received music lessons from Pedro Anselmo Marchal and violin lessons from Francesco Vaccari. The Infante was a skillful singer with a good bass singing voice. His rooms at the Royal Palace were a gathering place for musicians and singers and he used to sing with them. The Infante also sang during musical evenings at the royal palace in the company of professional singers. From his youth until the end of his life, Francisco de Paula gathered an extensive sheet music collection that included almost 700 scores. This collection, acquired by the Biblioteca Nacional de España, has been preserved to this day. When Ferdinand VII created the Madrid Royal Conservatory in 1830, the Infante was made an honorary member.

== Political struggles ==
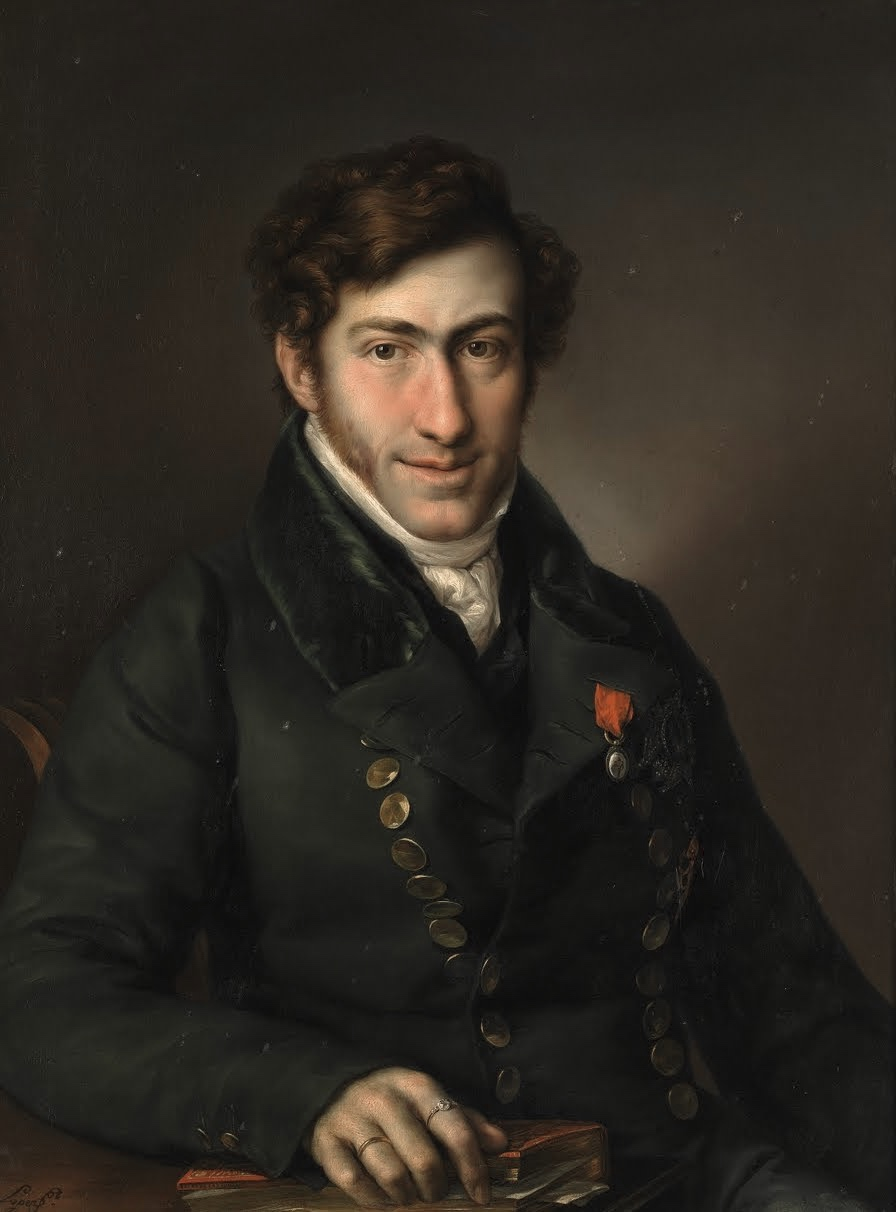
A young Infante Francisco de Paula by Vicente López Portaña

King Ferdinand VII remained childless during the 1820s. His third wife, Maria Josepha Amalia of Saxony was barren. It was expected that his second brother, Infante Carlos, would succeed him. Religious and conservative, Don Carlos was married to the Portuguese Infanta Maria Francisca of Braganza. The couple had three sons. Infante Francisco de Paula supported his brothers's absolutist political views even if his own were more moderate liberal, but his energetic wife constantly dragged him into endless political struggles. Luisa Carlotta, although constantly pregnant, was meddlesome with a keen interest in government affairs. As she had a grudge against Maria Francisca and Maria Francisca's sister, Maria Teresa, Princess of Beira (widow of Francisco de Paula's cousin, Infante Pedro Carlos), Luisa Carlotta was determined to avoid Don Carlos becoming King after Ferdinand VII's death. The opportunity came with the death of Queen Maria Josepha in May 1829. On good terms with her brother in law Ferdinand VII, Luisa Carlotta convinced the King to marry her sister Maria Christina of the Two Sicilies. Their wedding took place in December that same year. The eldest of Ferdinand VII and Maria Christina's two daughters, Isabella, became heir to the crown thanks in great part to Luisa Carlotta's intervention. Don Carlos and his family opposed the change of the succession and they had to leave the country. Ferdinand VII died shortly after, on 29 September 1833.

At the ascension to the Spanish throne of the three-year-old Isabella II, under the regency of Queen Maria Christina, Infante Francisco de Paula was disappointed at not being included in the new government. Three months after Ferdinand VII's death, Maria Christina secretly contracted a morganatic marriage with a sergeant from the royal guard. Luisa Carlotta quarreled with her sister over this marriage. Within months, Don Francsico and his wife began to conspire against the regent with the support of the liberals. Spain plunged into turmoil as Don Carlos and his ultra-royalist followers attempted to seize power by force, unleashing a civil war (1833 -1839). Maria Christina held on to power with the help of the moderates. She mistrusted her ambitious sister and when in 1837 Don Francisco claimed a place in the senate, Maria Christina refused to approve his appointment. This not only thwarted the Infante's appointment, but cemented the enmity between Luisa Carlotta and her sister, the Queen regent. Their relationship never recovered. For the next five years Francisco de Paula and his wife intrigued against Maria Christina, undermining her power. These political intrigues were such as that Maria Christina ordered Infante Francisco and his family to move abroad.

== Exiles and returns ==
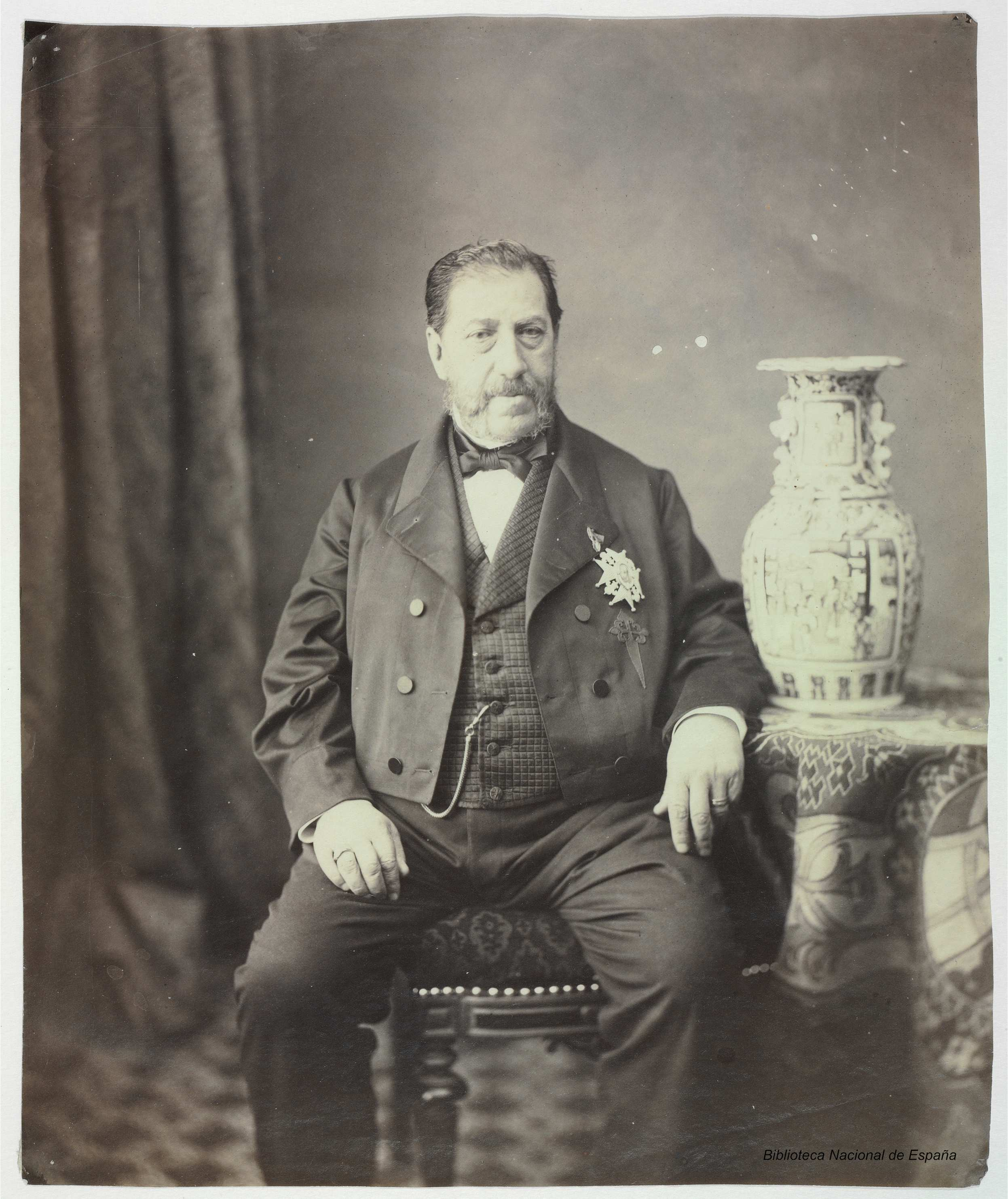
Infante Francisco de Paula (photograph taken by Infante Sebastian)

In the spring 1838 Infante Francisco de Paula, his wife and their children settled in exile in France accompanied by the Infante's personal secretary the Count of Parcent. They found a prominent position at the court of Louis Philippe I, King of the French, whose wife Queen Maria Amelia, was an aunt of Infanta Luisa Carlotta. The Duchess of Dino who met Don Francisco de Paula and his family at the French court, described them as follows: "The Infanta is very fair, with a face which, though washed out, is none the less stern, with a rough manner of speaking. I felt very ill at ease with her, although she was very courteous. Her husband is red-haired and ugly, and the whole tribe of little infantes, boys and girls, are utterly detestable". Meanwhile, in Spain, General Baldomero Espartero, credited for the victory over the Carlists in 1839, took the post of prime minister. He soon became virtually a dictator, and forced Queen Maria Cristina to resign the regency, sending her to exile in France in October 1840. Maria Cristina's fall from power opened the door for Infante Francisco de Paula return to Spain.

Once back in Spain, Francisco de Paula and Luisa Carlotta initially settled in Burgos as Espartero banned them from approaching the capital. Eventually, the regent relented and allowed them to live in Madrid, but not in the Royal Palace. The couple hoped to exert influence over the Queen and foster their plan of marrying Isabella II and her sister, Infanta Luisa Fernanda to their sons Infantes Don Francisco de Asis and Don Enrique. When they tried to pressure Espartero in sanctioning the double marriages, he banished them to Zaragoza in August 1842.

Arriving in Zaragoza in October 1842, the Infante and his wife were at the center of the opposition of Espartero's government. In November, the Infante's supporters tried to provoke a coup d'état overthrowing the regency in favor of Don Francisco de Paula. When the plan was discovered, Espartero expelled the Infante and his wife from Spain once again. However his new exile was short lived. In July 1843, a military upraising combined with a conspiracy of the moderates overthrew the regency. The rebels declared Queen Isabella of age, and Espartero went into exile in England.

Infante Francisco returned to Madrid with his family. From then on they lived at their own residence, the Palace of San Juan, built in 1815 by Ferdinand VII, near the park of El Retiro. They also had a house in close proximity to the Royal Palace at No 40 La Luna street. On 29 January 1844, Luisa Carlotta died suddenly of measles, aged 39. Widowed, Francisco de Paula continued living at the palace of San Juan. He wished to remarry and made a proposal to his sister-in-law and niece Princess Maria Carolina of the Two Sicilies, but the project did not come to fruition. He renewed his efforts in his plan to marry his nieces to his two sons, but was not successful. However, under pressure of French diplomacy, Maria Cristina, who personally disliked his nephew Francisco de Asis, agreed to sanction the marriage of her daughter Queen Isabella to her cousin. Antoine, Duke of Montpensier, the youngest son of King Louis Philippe of France, was chosen as Infanta Luisa Fernanda's husband. The rejected Infante Don Enrique was involved in a conspiracy and had to go into exile.

== Last years ==
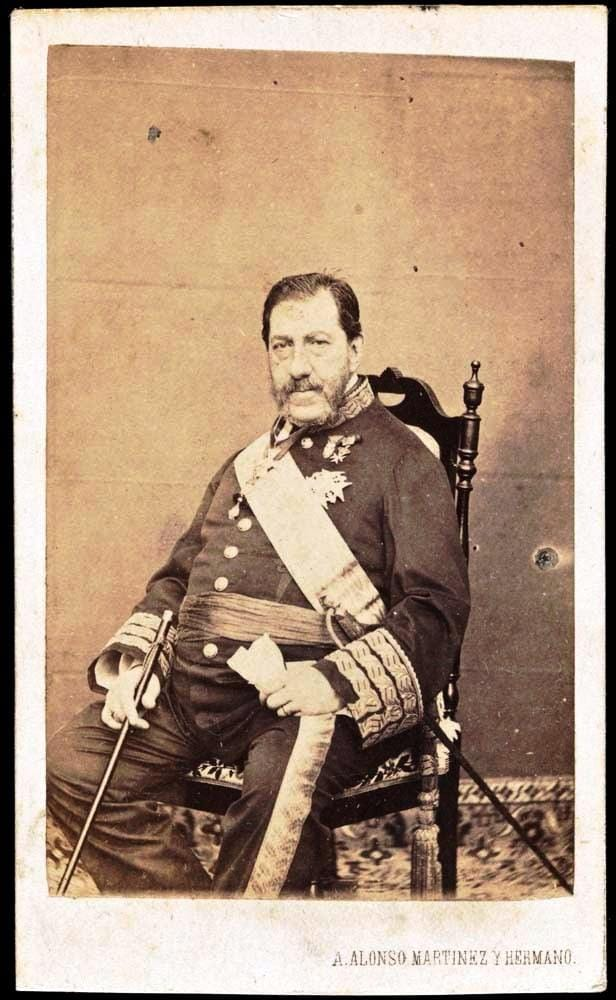
Infante Francisco de Paula of Spain in old age

As his son, Francisco de Asis, became king consort on 10 October 1846, Francisco de Paula's profile at court rose. He was well liked by Isabella II and one of his daughters, Infanta Josepha, became the Queen's best friend. However, the marriage between his son and his niece was an unhappy one. In 1849, Infante Francisco de Paula tried to intervene in an effort to reconcile the spouses. He sided with the Queen, but because at the same time he suggested her to form a cabinet with members of the progressive party, the moderate government expelled him from Spain. In 1850, he was allowed to return.

Back in Spain, Infante Francisco de Paula was involved in a scandal. He was found playing sexual games with two women while blindfolded. The women were sent away by the police. Eventually, at age fifty-eight, Francisco de Paula contracted a morganatic marriage on 19 December 1852 in Madrid. Little is known about his second wife, Teresa de Arredondo y Ramirez de Arellano, except that she was from Murcia and a good dancer. Her age is unknown, but she was much younger than her husband. She was not short of economical means as she brought into her marriage a considerable dowry. The couple had a son, Ricardo María de Arredondo, born a week after the wedding, on 26 December 1852. The child was not permitted to carry the Bourbon last name, instead he was given the title of Duke of San Ricardo by Isabella II in 1864.

His second marriage lasted twelve years and was a happy one. In letters and documents, Infante Francisco de Paula praised his wife's devotion to him. They lived a discreet life at the palace of San Juan. Don Francisco de Paula appeared frequently in court events, but always without his wife. Doña Teresa died, still young, on 29 December 1863. Their eleven-year-old son, Ricardo María, was put under the care of his maternal grandmother. In his will, Infante Francisco de Paula tried to protect his youngest son's inheritance and placed him under the custody of Queen Isabella II. Less than a year after his second widowhood, Infante Francisco de Paula died of colon cancer on 13 August 1865. He had wished to be buried at the church of San Francisco, but he was buried at the Escorial as was due a person of his rank.

== Marriages and children ==
Francisco de Paula married twice. His first wife was his niece Princess Luisa Carlotta of the Two Sicilies, daughter of Francis I of the Two Sicilies and María Isabel of Spain. They married on 12 June 1819 in Madrid and had eleven children.

- Francisco de Asis de Borbón, Infante of Spain, Duke of Cádiz (6 May 1820 – 15 November 1821) died in infancy.
- Isabel de Borbón, Infanta of Spain (18 May 1821 – 8 May 1897); married, morganatically, Count Ignaz Gurowski
- Francisco de Asis de Borbón, Duke of Cádiz, king consort of Spain (13 May 1822 – 16 April 1902). Husband of Queen Isabella II
- Enrique de Borbón, Duke of Seville (17 April 1823 – 12 March 1870); married, morganatically, Elena de Castellvi y Shelly-Fernandez de Cordova
- Luisa de Borbón, Infanta of Spain (11 June 1824 – 27 December 1900); married morganatically José María Osorio de Moscoso, Duke of Sessa
- Duarte Felipe de Borbón, Infante of Spain (4 April 1826 – 22 October 1830) died in childhood.
- Josefina de Borbón, Infanta of Spain (25 May 1827 – 10 June 1910); married, morganatically, José Güell y Rente
- Teresa de Borbón, Infanta of Spain (16 November 1828 – 13 November 1829) died in infancy.
- Fernando de Borbón, Infante of Spain (15 April 1832 – 17 July 1854) died aged 22, never married. Had no issue.
- Maria Cristina de Borbón, Infanta of Spain (5 June 1833 – 19 January 1902); married Infante Sebastian of Portugal and Spain
- Amelia de Borbón, Infanta of Spain (12 October 1834 – 27 August 1905); married Prince Adalbert of Bavaria

Infante Francisco de Paula contracted a morganatic marriage on 19 December 1852 with Teresa de Arredondo y Ramirez de Arellano. They had one son.

- Fernando Montequer, birth and death date unknown
- Ricardo María de Arredondo (26 December 1852 – 28 January 1872), Duke of San Ricardo. Died young, unmarried.

Before his marriage to Luisa Carlotta, it had been hoped by both his parents and brother that he would marry his niece, Princess Maria Luisa Carlota of Parma, daughter of his older sister Maria Luisa and her husband Louis.

== Honours ==
- France: Knight of the Order of the Holy Spirit (18 April 1816)
- Austria: Grand Cross of the Order of St. Stephen (1818)

== Heraldry ==
Heraldry of Francisco de Paula of Spain

Coat of Arms of Infante Francisco de Paula of Spain

== Ancestry ==
Ancestors of Francisco de Paula of Spain

8. Philip V of Spain
4. Charles III of Spain
9. Elisabeth Farnese
2. Charles IV of Spain
10. Augustus III of Poland
5. Maria Amalia of Saxony
11. Maria Josepha of Austria
1. Francisco de Paula of Spain
12. Philip V of Spain (= 8)
6. Philip, Duke of Parma
13. Elisabeth Farnese (= 9)
3. Maria Luisa of Parma
14. Louis XV of France
7. Louise-Élisabeth of France
15. Marie Leszczyńska
