= List of Infantas of Spain =

List of individuals with title of Infanta of Spain (Infanta de España) by birth or marriage since the reign of Carlos I, under whom the crowns of Castile and Aragon were united, forming the Kingdom of Spain. Individuals holding the title of Infanta are often styled Royal Highness (Alteza Real).

== Infantas of Spain by birth ==
Picture	Name	Arms	Parent	Born	Died	Marriage	Notes
	María de Austria y Aviz		Carlos I	1528	1603	Maximilian II, Holy Roman Emperor (m. 1548; died 1576)	
	Juana de Austria y Aviz		Carlos I	1535	1573	João Manuel, Prince of Portugal (m. 1552; died 1554)	
	Isabel Clara Eugenia de Austria y Valois		Felipe II	1566	1633	Albrecht VII, Archduke of Austria (m. 1599; died 1621)	
	Catalina Micaela de Austria y Valois		Felipe II	1567	1597	Carlo Emanuele I, Duke of Savoy (m. 1584)	
	María de Austria y Austria		Felipe II	1580	1583		Died in infancy
	Ana María Mauricia de Austria y Austria		Felipe III	1601	1666	Louis XIII, King of France (m. 1615; died 1643)	
	María de Austria y Austria		Felipe III	1603			Died in infancy
	María Ana de Austria y Austria		Felipe III	1606	1646	Ferdinand III, Holy Roman Emperor (m. 1631)	
	Margarita Francisca de Austria y Austria		Felipe III	1610	1617		Died in childhood
	María Margarita de Austria y Borbón		Felipe IV	1621			Died in infancy
	Margarita María Catalina de Austria y Borbón		Felipe IV	1623			Died in infancy
	María Eugenia de Austria y Borbón		Felipe IV	1625	1627		Died in infancy
	Isabel María Teresa de Austria y Borbón		Felipe IV	1627			Died in infancy
	María Ana Antonia de Austria y Borbón		Felipe IV	1636			Died in infancy
	María Teresa de Austria y Borbón		Felipe IV	1638	1683	Louis XIV, King of France (m. 1660)	
	Margarita Teresa de Austria y Austria		Felipe IV	1651	1673	Leopold I, Holy Roman Emperor (m. 1666)	
	María Ambrosia de la Concepción de Austria y Austria		Felipe IV	1655	1655		Died in infancy
	Mariana Victoria de Borbón y Farnesio		Felipe V	1718	1781	José I, King of Portugal (m. 1729; died 1777)	
	María Teresa Antonia Rafaela de Borbón y Farnesio		Felipe V	1726	1746	Louis, Dauphin of France (m. 1746)	
	María Antonia Fernanda de Borbón y Farnesio		Felipe V	1729	1785	Vittorio Amadeo III, King of Sardinia (m. 1750)	
	Isabel María Luisa Antonia Fernanda Josefa Saveria Dominica Juana de Borbón y Borbón		Felipe I, Duke of Parma	1741	1763	Josef II, Holy Roman Empire (m. 1760)	
	María Isabel Antonia de Padua Francisca Januaria Francisca de Paula Juana Nepomucena Josefina Onesifora de Borbón y Sajonia		Carlos III	1740	1742		Died in infancy
	María Josefa Antonia de Borbón y Sajonia		Carlos III	1742	1742		Died in infancy
	María Isabel Ana de Borbón y Sajonia		Carlos III	1743	1749		Died in childhood
	María Josefa Carmela de Borbón y Sajonia		Carlos III	1744	1801		Died unmarried
	María Luisa de Borbón y Sajonia		Carlos III	1745	1792	Leopold II, Holy Roman Emperor (m. 1764; died 1792)	
	María Teresa Antonieta Francisca Javier Francisca de Paula Serafina de Borbón y Sajonia		Carlos III	1749	1750		Died in infancy
	María Ana de Borbón y Sajonia		Carlos III	1754	1755		Died in infancy
	Carlota Joaquina Teresa Cayetana de Borbón y Borbón-Parma		Carlos IV	1775	1830	João VI of Portugal (m. 1785; died 1826)	
	María Luisa de Borbón y Borbón-Parma		Carlos IV	1777	1782		Died in infancy
	María Amalia de Borbón y Borbón-Parma		Carlos IV	1779	1798	Infante Antonio Pascual (m. 1795)	
	María Luisa Josefina Antonieta Vicenta de Borbón y Borbón-Parma		Carlos IV	1782	1824	Ludovico I, King of Etruria (m. 1795; died 1803)	
	María Isabella de Borbón y Borbón-Parma		Carlos IV	1789	1848	Francesco I, King of the Two Sicilies (m. 1802; died 1830) Francesco, Count dal Balzo dei Duchi di Presenzano (m. 1839)	
	María Teresa de Borbón y Borbón-Parma		Carlos IV	1791	1794		Died in childhood
	María Carlota Josefa Joaquina Ana Rafaela Antonieta Francisca de Asís Agustina Magdalena Francisca de Paula Clotilde Lutgarda Te de Borbón y Bragança		Infante Gabriel	1787	1787		Died in infancy
	María Luisa Isabel de Borbón y Bragança		Fernando VII	1817	1818		Died in infancy
	María Isabel Luisa de Borbón y Borbón-Dos Sicilias later, Isabel II		Fernando VII	1830	1904	Infante Francisco de Asís, Duke of Cádiz (m. 1846; died 1902)	Queen regnant from 1833 to 1868
	María Luisa Fernanda de Borbón y Borbón-Dos Sicilias		Fernando VII	1832	1897	Prince Antoine, Duke of Montpensier (m. 1846; died 1890)	
	Isabel Fernanda de Borbón y Borbón-Dos Sicilias		Infante Francisco de Paula, Duke of Cádiz	1821	1897	Count Ignatius de Gurowski (m. 1841; died 1887)	
	Luisa Teresa de Borbón y Borbón-Dos Sicilias		Infante Francisco de Paula, Duke of Cádiz	1824	1900	José María Osorio de Moscoso y Carvajal, Duke de Sessa (m. 1847)	
	Josefina Fernanda de Borbón y Borbón-Dos Sicilias		Infante Francisco de Paula, Duke of Cádiz	1827	1910	José Güell y Renté (m. 1848)	
	Teresa de Borbón y Borbón-Dos Sicilias		Infante Francisco de Paula, Duke of Cádiz	1828	1829		Died in infancy
	María Cristina de Borbón y Borbón-Dos Sicilias		Infante Francisco de Paula, Duke of Cádiz	1833	1902	Infante Sebastian of Portugal and Spain (m. 1860; died 1875)	
	Amalia Filipina del Pilar Blasa Bonisa Vita Rita Lutgarda Romana Judas Tadea Alberta Josefa Ana Joaquina Los Doce Apostólicos Bonifacia Domenica Bibiana Verónica de Borbón y Borbón-Dos Sicilias		Infante Francisco de Paula, Duke of Cádiz	1834	1905	Prince Adalbert of Bavaria (m. 1856; died 1875)	
	María Isabel Francisca de Asís Cristina Francisca de Paula Dominga de Borbón y Borbón		Isabel II	1851	1931	Prince Gaetan, Count of Girgenti (m. 1868; died 1871)	Princess of Asturias from 1874 to 1880
	María Cristina de Bourbon y Bourbon		Isabel II	1854	1854		Died in infancy
	María de la Concepcion de Bourbon y Bourbon		Isabel II	1859	1861		Died in infancy
	María del Pilar Berenguela Isabel Francisca de Asís Cristina Sebastiana Gabriela Francisca Caracciolo Saturnina de Borbón y Borbón		Isabel II	1861	1879		Died unmarried
	María de la Paz Juana Amelia Adalberta Francisca de Paula Juana Bautista Isabel Francisca de Asís de Borbón y Borbón		Isabel II	1862	1946	Prince Ludwig Ferdinand of Bavaria (m. 1883)	
	María Eulalia Francisca de Asís Margarita Roberta Isabel Francisca de Paula Cristina María de la Piedad de Borbón y Borbón		Isabel II	1864	1958	Infante Antonio, Duke of Galliera (m. 1886; died 1930)	
	María Isabel Francisca de Asís Antonia Luisa Fernanda Cristina Amelia Felipa Adelaida Josefa Elena Enriqueta Carolina Justina Rufina Gasparina Melchora Baltasara Matea de Orléans y Borbón		Infanta Luisa Fernanda	1848	1919	Prince Philippe, Count of Paris (m. 1864; died 1894)	
	María Amelia de Orléans y Borbón		Infanta Luisa Fernanda	1851	1870		Died unmarried
	María Cristina de Orléans y Borbón		Infanta Luisa Fernanda	1852	1879		Died unmarried
	María de la Regla de Orléans y Borbón		Infanta Luisa Fernanda	1856	1861		Died in childhood
	María de las Mercedes Isabel Francisca de Asís Antonia Luisa Fernanda de Orléans y Borbón		Infanta Luisa Fernanda	1860	1878	Alfonso XII (m. 1878)	
	María de las Mercedes Isabel Teresa Cristina Alfonsa de Borbón y Habsburgo-Lorena		Alfonso XII	1880	1904	Prince Carlos of Bourbon-Two Sicilies (m. 1901)	Princess of Asturias from 1881 to 1904
	María Teresa Isabel Eugenia del Patrocinio Diega de Borbón y Habsburgo-Lorena		Alfonso XII	1882	1912	Prince Ferdinand of Bavaria (m. 1906)	
	Beatriz Isabel Federica Alfonsa Eugénie Cristina María Teresia Bienvenida Ladislàa de Borbón y Battenberg		Alfonso XII	1909	2002	Alessandro Torlonia, 5th Prince of Civitella-Cesi (m. 1935; died 1986)	
	María Cristina Teresa Alejandra María de Guadalupe María de la Concepción Ildefonsa Victoria Eugenia de Borbón y Battenberg		Alfonso XII	1911	1996	Enrico Marone-Cinzano, 1st Count Marone (m. 1940; died 1968)	
	Isabel Alfonsa María Teresa Antonia Cristina Mercedes Carolina Adelaida Rafaela de Borbón-Dos Sicilias y Borbón		María de las Mercedes, Princess of Asturias	1904	1985	Count Jan Kanty Zamoyski (m. 1929; died 1961)	
	María de las Mercedes Teresa María de la Paz Fernanda Adalberta Cristina Antonia Isidra Raimunda Josefa Jesusa Fausta Francisca de Borja y Todos los Santos de Baviera y Borbón		Infanta María Teresa	1911	1953	Prince Irakli Bagration of Mukhrani (m. 1946)	
	María del Pilar de Baviera y Borbón		Infanta María Teresa	1912	1918		Died in childhood
	María del Pilar Alfonsa Juana Victoria Luisa Ignacia y Todos los Santos de Borbón y Borbón-Dos Sicilias		Infante Juan, Count of Barcelona	1936	2020	Luis Gómez-Acebo y Duque de Estrada, Viscount of La Torre (m. 1967; died 1991)	Created Duchess of Badajoz in 1967
	Margarita María de la Victoria Esperanza Jacoba Felicidad Perpetua de Todos los Santos de Borbón y Borbón-Dos Sicilias		Infante Juan, Count of Barcelona	1939		Carlos Zurita (m. 1972)	Became 2nd Duchess of Hernani in 1981; Created Duchess of Soria in 1981
	Elena María Isabel Dominica de Silos de Borbón y de Grecia		Juan Carlos I	1963		Jaime de Marichalar (m. 1995; div. 2010)	Created Duchess of Lugo in 1995
	Cristina Federica Victoria Antonia de la Santísima Trinidad de Borbón y de Grecia		Juan Carlos I	1965		Iñaki Urdangarin (m. 1997)	Created Duchess of Palma de Mallorca in 1997; Stripped of dukedom in 2015
	Leonor de Todos los Santos de Borbón y Ortiz		Felipe VI	2005			Princess of Asturias from 2014
	Sofía de Todos Los Santos de Borbón y Ortiz		Felipe VI	2007			

== Infantas of Spain by marriage ==
Since 1987, consorts of infantes or infantas of Spain ceased to be considered as such. Instead, according to article 3.1 of the royal decree that regulates the titles and styles of the members of the Spanish royal family, "their consorts, as long as their remain as such or as widowers, will have the style and honor that the King will graciously grant them according to the provisions of article 62, section f) of the Constitution", which has usually been a royal dukedom conferred for life to the couple upon their marriage.

Picture	Name	Arms	Husband	Marriage	Born	Died	Notes
	Infanta Maria Manuela of Portugal		Felipe, Prince of Asturias	1543	1527	1545	
	Mary I, Queen of England and Ireland		Felipe, Prince of Asturias	1554	1516	1558	
	Princess Elisabeth of France		Felipe, Prince of Asturias	1615	1602	1644	
	Princess Louise Élisabeth of Orléans		Luis, Prince of Asturias	1721	1709	1742	
	Infanta Barbara of Portugal		Fernando, Prince of Asturias	1729	1711	1758	
	Princess Maria Amalia of Saxony		Carlos VII/V, King of Naples and Sicily	1738	1724	1760	
	Princess Louise Élisabeth of France		Felipe I, Duke of Parma	1739	1727	1759	
	Princess Maria Luisa of Parma		Carlos, Prince of Asturias	1765	1751	1819	
	Infanta Mariana Victoria of Portugal		Infante Gabriel	1785	1768	1788	
	Infanta María Amalia		Infante Antonio Pascual	1795	1779	1789	Infanta of Spain by birth
	Archduchess Maria Amalia of Austria		Ferdinando, Duke of Parma	1769	1746	1804	
	Princess Maria Antonia of Naples and Sicily		Fernando, Prince of Asturias	1802	1784	1806	
	Infanta Maria Francisca of Portugal		Infante Carlos María Isidro	1816	1800	1834	
	Infanta Maria Teresa of Portugal		Infante Pedro Carlos; Infante Carlos María Isidro	1810; 1838	1793	1874	
	Princess Luisa Carlotta of the Two Sicilies		Infante Francisco de Paula, Duke of Cádiz	1819	1804	1844	
	Isabel II		Infante Francisco de Asís, Duke of Cádiz	1846	1830	1904	Queen regnant Infanta of Spain by birth
	Princess Maria Amalia of the Two Sicilies		Infante Sebastián	1832	1818	1857	
	Infanta María Cristina		Infante Sebastián	1860	1833	1902	Infanta of Spain by birth
	Princess Maria Teresa of Savoy		Carlos II, Duke of Parma	1820	1803	1879	
	Infanta Eulalia		Infante Antonio, Duke of Galliera	1886	1864	1958	Infanta of Spain by birth
	Princess Louise of France		Carlos III, Duke of Parma	1845	1819	1864	
	Princess Louise of Orléans		Infante Carlos	1907	1882	1958	
	Infanta María Teresa		Infante Ferdinando	1906	1882	1912	Infanta of Spain by birth
	Maria Luisa de Silva y Fernández de Henestrosa		Infante Ferdinando	1914	1880	1955	
	Princess Beatrice of Saxe-Coburg and Gotha		Infante Alfonso, Duke of Galliera	1909	1884	1966	
	Princess Maria Pia of Bourbon-Two Sicilies		Roberto I, Duke of Parma	1869	1849	1882	
	Infanta Maria Antónia of Portugal		Roberto I, Duke of Parma	1884	1862	1959	
	Princess María de las Mercedes of Bourbon-Two Sicilies		Infante Juan, Count of Barcelona	1935	1910	2000	
	Princess Alicia of Bourbon-Parma		Infante Alfonso, Duke of Calabria	1936	1917	2017	
	Princess Sophia of Greece and Denmark		Juan Carlos, Prince of Asturias	1962	1938		

== See also ==
- Monarchy of Spain
- House of Bourbon
- House of Habsburg-Spain
