= Infanta Maria of Spain =

Infanta Maria of Spain may refer to:

- Maria of Spain (1528–1603), elder daughter of Philip II; Holy Roman Empress (1564–1576) by marriage to Maximilian II.
- Infanta Maria of Spain (1603), second daughter of Philip III; died in infancy.
- Maria of Spain (1606–1646), third daughter of Philip III; Holy Roman Empress (1637–1646) by marriage to Ferdinand III.
- Mariana Victoria of Spain (1718–1781), eldest daughter of Philip V; Queen of Portugal (1750–1777) by marriage to José I.
- Infanta María del Pilar (1861–1879), second daughter of Isabella II; died unmarried.
- Infanta María de la Paz of Spain (1862–1946), third daughter of Isabella II; member of the Bavarian royal family by marriage to Prince Ludwig Ferdinand of Bavaria.
- Infanta Maria Eulalia of Spain (1864–1958), youngest daughter of Isabella II; Duchess of Galliera by marriage to Infante Antonio, Duke of Galliera.
- Maria de las Mercedes of Orleans (1860–1878), daughter of Prince Antoine, Duke of Monpensier, and Infanta Luisa Fernanda of Spain; Queen of Spain by marriage to Alfonso XII.
- María de las Mercedes, Princess of Asturias (1880–1904), elder daughter of Alfonso XII; Princess of Asturias in her own right.
- Princess María de las Mercedes of Bourbon-Two Sicilies (1910–2000), wife of Infante Juan, Count of Barcelona; mother of the current king Felipe VI.
- María Teresa of Spain (disambiguation), topics referred to by the same term
  - Maria Theresa of Spain (1638–1683), elder daughter of Philip IV; Queen of France (1660–1683) by marriage to Louis XIV.
  - Maria Teresa Rafaela of Spain (1626–1646), second daughter of Philip V; Dauphine of France by marriage to Louis, Dauphin of France (1729–1765).
  - Infanta María Teresa of Spain (1882–1912), younger daughter of Alfonso XII; member of the Bavarian royal family by marriage to Prince Ferdinand of Bavaria.
