= Duchess of Galliera =

Italian noble title

== Duchess of Galliera ==
=== First Creation ===
- None

=== Second Creation ===
Picture	Name	Father	Birth	Marriage	Became Duchess	Ceased to be Duchess	Death	Spouse
	Maria de Brignole-Sale	Antoine de Brignole-Sale (Brignole-Sale)	1812	1828	1837; 2nd Creation	23 November 1876 husband's death	9 December 1888	Raffaele de Ferrari

=== Third Creation ===
Picture	Name	Arms	Father	Birth	Marriage	Became Duchess	Ceased to be Duchess	Death	Spouse
	Luisa Fernanda of Spain		Ferdinand VII of Spain (Bourbon)	30 January 1832	10 October 1846	9 December 1888 husband's accession	4 February 1890 husband's death	2 February 1897	Prince Antoine
	Eulalia of Spain		Francis, Duke of Cádiz (Bourbon)	12 February 1864	6 March 1886	4 February 1890 husband's accession	24 December 1930 husband's death	8 March 1958	Infante Antonio
	Beatrice of Saxe-Coburg and Gotha		Alfred, Duke of Saxe-Coburg and Gotha (Saxe-Coburg and Gotha)	20 April 1884	15 July 1909	24 December 1930 husband's accession	14 July 1937 husband's abdication	13 July 1966	Infante Alfonso
	Carla Parodi-Delfino		Leopoldo Girolamo Parodi-Delfino, Senator of the Kingdom of Italy	13 December 1909	10 July 1937	14 July 1937 husband's accession	22 August 1997 husband's death	27 July 2000	Infante Alvaro
	Véronique Goeders		Jean-Marie Goeders	16 November 1970	28 March 1994	22 August 1997 husband's accession	2001 divorce	living	Don Alfonso
VACANT
