= Duke of Galliera =

Italian noble title

Arms of Dukes of Galliera of the House of Orléans

Duke of Galliera is a title of Italian nobility that has been created several times for members of different families. The name of the title refers to the comune of Galliera, which is located in the Province of Bologna in Emilia–Romagna.

== History ==
The title was first created in 1812 by Napoleon I for Josephine of Leuchtenberg, daughter of Eugène de Beauharnais (and granddaughter of Napoleon's first wife, Josephine). She kept the title even after she married Oscar, Crown Prince of Sweden. Napoleon had already given her the Palazzo Caprara in Bologna in 1807, which was renamed the Palazzo Galliera.

In 1837, after a decade of negotiations, Crown Prince Oscar sold properties attached to the dukedom to Marquis Raffaele de Ferrari of Genoa. The following year, the marquis received the title of Duke of Galliera from Pope Gregory XVI (Galliera was then part of the Papal States). In 1839, King Charles Albert of Sardinia confirmed the grant to the marquis and added the title of Prince of Lucedio (a former abbey).

With his wife, Maria Brignole-Sale, the new Duke of Galliera had three children, but two of them died young and childless. The third, the famous philatelist Philipp von Ferrary, renounced the title and the inheritance to which it was linked.

In 1877, after the death of her husband, Maria Brignole-Sale (a fervent Orléanist) bequeathed his Italian properties to Prince Antoine, Duke of Montpensier, the youngest son of Louis-Philippe I, King of the French. After the death of Maria Brignole-Sale in 1888, Prince Antoine received the ducal title of Galliera from King Umberto I of Italy. Since then, the title of Duke of Galliera has belonged to the Orléans branch of the Spanish royal family, although the properties attached to the dukedom were sold by Infante Antonio in 1920.

== Bernadotte-Leuchtenberg dukes ==
Name	Portrait	Birth	Marriages	Death
Josephine; 1812–1837		14 March 1807; Milan eldest daughter of Eugène de Beauharnais and Princess Augusta of Bavaria	19 June 1823; Stockholm five children	7 June 1876; Stockholm aged 69
Oscar; 1823–1837		4 July 1799; Paris only son of Charles XIV John of Sweden and Désirée Clary	19 June 1823; Stockholm five children	8 July 1859; Stockholm aged 60

== Ferrari Brignole-Sale dukes ==
Name	Portrait	Birth	Marriages	Death
Raffaele de Ferrari; 1838–1876		6 July 1803; Genoa son of Andrea de Ferrari and Livia Ignazia Pallavicino	c. 1828 three children	23 November 1876; Genoa aged 73
Maria de Brignole-Sale; 1876–1888		5 April 1811; Genoa daughter of Antoine Brignole-Sale, Marchese di Groppoli and Arthemisa Negrone, of Genoa	c. 1828 three children	9 December 1888; Genoa aged 76

== Orléans dukes ==
Name	Portrait	Arms	Birth	Marriages	Death
Prince Antoine; 1888–1890			31 July 1824; Château de Neuilly, Neuilly-sur-Seine fifth son of Louis-Philippe of France and Maria Amalia of Naples and Sicily	Infanta Luisa Fernanda of Spain; 10 October 1846; Madrid ten children	4 February 1890; Palacio de Orleans-Borbón, Sanlúcar de Barrameda aged 65
Infante Antonio; 1890–1930			23 February 1866; Seville only surviving son of Antoine and Infanta Luisa Fernanda of Spain	Infanta Eulalia of Spain; 6 March 1886; Madrid three children	24 December 1930; Paris aged 64
Infante Alfonso; 1930–1975			12 November 1886; Madrid eldest son of Antonio and Infanta Eulalia of Spain	Princess Beatrice of Saxe-Coburg and Gotha; 15 July 1909; St. Augustine's Church, Coburg three children	6 August 1975; Sanlúcar de Barrameda aged 88
Infante Álvaro; 1975–1997			20 April 1910; Coburg eldest son of Alfonso and Princess Beatrice of Saxe-Coburg and Gotha	Carla Parodi-Delfino; 10 July 1937; Rome four children	22 August 1997; Monte Carlo aged 87
Don Alfonso; 1997–present			2 January 1968; Santa Cruz de Tenerife eldest son of Don Alonso de Orleans-Borbón y Parodi-Delfino and Emilia Ferrara-Pignatelli	Véronique Goeders; 28 March 1994; Paris one son	living

== See also ==
- Duchess of Galliera
- Palais Galliera

== Notes and references ==
- History of the Duchy of Galliera.
- Dominique Paoli, Fortunes and Misfortunes of the Princes of Orleans, 1848-1918, Artena, 2006, p. 248. 248.
- Duke of Galliera Escapes. Appears in Italy from Madrid, where King was his Guardian. The New York Times. September 12 1919.
- Franco Ardizzoni, 'Il Ducato di Galliera, Dalle terre della "bassa" all'Europa'
