= Princess María Cristina of Orléans =

Spanish princess (1852-1879)

Maria Christina of Spain
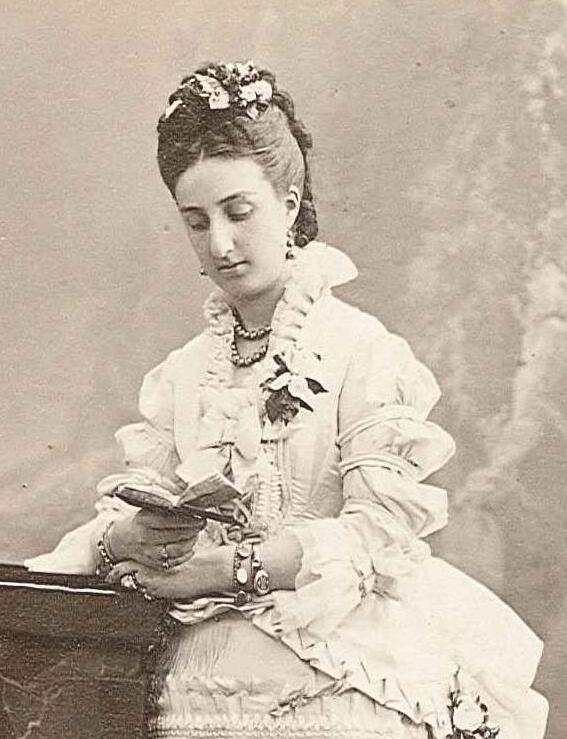
- María Christina in 1876
- Born: 29 October 1852; Palace of San Telmo, Seville
- Died: 28 April 1879 (aged 26); Palace of San Telmo, Seville
- Burial: Infantes Pantheon, Royal Monastery of San Lorenzo de El Escorial, Spain
Names
- María Cristina Francisca de Paula Antonieta
- House: Orléans
- Father: Prince Antoine, Duke of Montpensier
- Mother: Infanta Luisa Fernanda of Spain

María Cristina of Orléans (María Cristina Francisca de Paula Antonieta. french: Marie-Christine-Françoise de Paule Antoinette; 29 October 1852 – 28 April 1879) was one of the daughters of Prince Antoine, Duke of Montpensier, a son of King Louis Philippe I, and Infanta Luisa Fernanda of Spain, the youngest daughter of Ferdinand VII of Spain. María Cristina was raised in Seville, and given her father's close relationship with the Spanish Royal Family, she and her siblings were awarded the title of Infante and Infanta of Spain. She died at the age of 26 from tuberculosis.

== Biography ==
María Cristina was born in Seville, a city in which her parents were forced to live in order to stay away from any palace intrigue in the court of Isabel II of Spain, her mother's sister. She was the third daughter of the nine offspring of her parents, but of them only three would survive childhood, apart from Maria Cristina: Marie Isabelle, Maria Amalia, Maria de las Mercedes, and Antonio. She was baptized Maria Cristina Francisca de Paula Antonietta, after one of her godfathers, her great-uncle Francisco de Paula, Duke of Cadiz, and maternal grandmother, Queen Maria Christina, whose name was imposed.

In 1878, her sister Mercedes, who was eight years younger than Maria Cristina, contracted a marriage with her cousin, Alfonso XII of Spain. The union, celebrated for love and not for political reasons, would help seal the personal gap between Isabel II and her sister, the Duchess of Montpensier, Cristina's mother. The happiness of the couple, and of the whole family, was shattered shortly thereafter when Queen Mercedes died of typhus aged only 18, five months and three days after the marriage. The death of the Queen plunged the Royal Family into deep sadness; Alfonso XII was especially heartbroken to have been widowed at only 20 years of age, but since he lacked an heir, the King was soon forced to look for a second wife. For a few months he courted Maria Cristina, who was willing to replace her late sister, but it soon became clear that she was suffering from tuberculosis. Maria Cristina died at the age of 26 on 28 April 1879 in her native Seville. She was buried in the Pantheon of the Infantes of the Monastery of San Lorenzo of El Escorial. Her cousin, Alfonso XII, married on 28 November that year with the Archduchess Maria Christina of Austria, and would have with her three children, Mercedes, named after María Cristina's sister the late Queen, Maria Teresa, and Alfonso, the future King of Spain.
