= Palacio de Orleans-Borbón =

Coordinates: 36.7759°N 6.3542°W

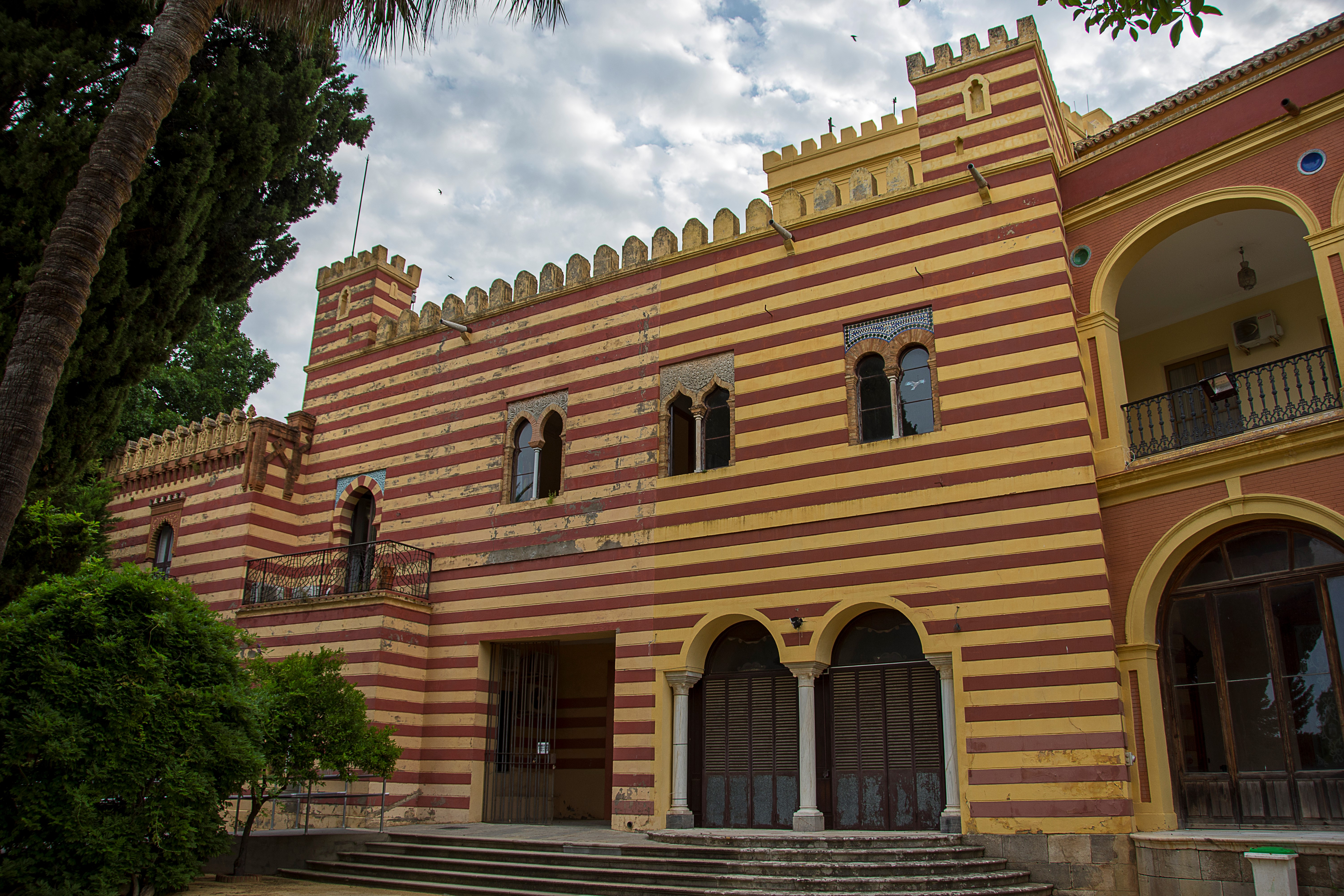
Palacio de Orleans-Borbón, located on Cuesta de Belén and Calle Caballero.

The Palacio de Orleans-Borbón rises in the Spanish town of Sanlucar de Barrameda in the Andalusian province of Cádiz. It was built between 1853 and 1870 as a summer residence for Antoine, Duke of Montpensier and Infanta Luisa Fernanda, Duchess of Montpensier, at the time Duke of Montpensier and Infante of Spain, respectively.

Today it is the seat of the municipality of Sanlucar de Barrameda and is known by the name of Town Hall (ayuntamiento).

For its construction, it took advantage of several pre-existing buildings, which were all given a common "wrapper". Thus it lacks axial and coaxial axis symmetry. It is built according to its own historical and eclectic style of much of the nineteenth century; using in the facades Neo-Mudéjar and Italian Classicism styles. In the decoration of the interior rooms, there are used a multitude of historicist styles (Neo-Mudéjar, Rococo, Chinoiserie, Egyptian, English, etc.).

The Town Hall is located next to the Church Nuestra Senora De La O, the town's oldest church.
