= María Teresa of Spain =

María Teresa of Spain may refer to:

- Infanta Maria Theresa of Spain (1638–1683), eldest daughter of Philip IV of Spain, wife of her first cousin Louis XIV of France
- Infanta Maria Teresa Rafaela of Spain (1726–1746), daughter of Philip V of Spain, wife of Louis, Dauphin of France, son of Louis XV of France; known as the Dauphine Marie-Thérèse
- Maria Teresa, Princess of Beira (1793–1874), Infanta of Portugal and Brazil, who married Infante Carlos of Spain, Count of Molina, and was known to some as Queen Maria Teresa of Spain
- Infanta Maria Teresa of Spain (1882–1912), Princess and Duchess of Bavaria, wife of Prince Ferdinand of Bavaria, Infante of Spain, daughter of Alfonso XII of Spain and Maria Christina of Austria
