= Duke of Talavera =

Title of Spanish nobility

Duke of Talavera de la Reina
- Creation date: 25 September 1914
- Created by: Alfonso XIII
- Peerage: Spanish nobility
- First holder: Infanta Maria Luisa, 1st Duchess of Talavera de la Reina
- Present holder: Juan Bautista de Silva-Bazán y Urquijo, 5th Duke of Talavera de la Reina

Duke of Talavera de la Reina (Spanish: Duque de Talavera de la Reina), commonly known as Duke of Talavera, is a hereditary title of Spanish nobility, accompanied by the dignity of Grandee. It was granted to María Luisa de Silva y Fernández de Henestrosa on 25 September 1914 by king Alfonso XIII as a result of her marriage to Infante Fernando, Prince of Bavaria. The king, who held great affection for her after taking care of his nephews, made her Infanta of Spain on 17 May 1927, to date, the only exception of a member of a non-dynastic family becoming an Infante.

== Dukes of Talavera de la Reina ==
1. María Luisa de Silva y Fernández de Henestrosa, 1st Duchess of Talavera de la Reina (1914–1955)
2. Juan de Silva y Goyeneche, 2nd Duke of Talavera de la Reina (1957–1963)
3. Juan Manuel de Silva y Mazorra, 3rd Duke of Talavera de la Reina (1964–1988)
4. Álvaro de Silva y Mazorra, 4th Duke of Talavera de la Reina (1990–2022)
5. Juan de Silva y Urquijo, 5th Duke of Talavera de la Reina (2023–present)

== Line of succession ==
- Luis de Silva-Bazán y Fernández de Henestrosa, 10th Count of Pie de Concha (1845–1918)
  - Infanta Maria Luisa, 1st Duchess of Talavera de la Reina, Grandee (1870–1955)
  - Francisco de Borja de Silva-Bazán y Fernández de Henestrosa, 20th Marquess of Zahara, 11th Count of Pie de Concha (1871–1935)
    - Juan de Silva-Bazán y Goyeneche, 2nd Duke of Talavera de la Reina, 22nd Marquess of Zahara, 13th Count of Pie de Concha (1897–1963)
      - Juan Manuel de Silva-Bazán y Mazorra, 3rd Duke of Talavera de la Reina, 14th Count of Pie de Concha (1934–1988)
      - Álvaro de Silva-Bazán y Mazorra, 4rd Duke of Talavera de la Reina, 15th Count of Pie de Concha (1938–2022)
        - Juan Bautista de Silva-Bazán y Urquijo, 5th Duke of Talavera de la Reina (b. 1965)
          - (1). Isabel de Silva-Bazán y Sarasola
          - (2). Juan Fernando de Silva-Bazán y Sarasola (b. 1998)
          - (3). Francisco Javier de Silva-Bazán y Sarasola (b. 2003)

== See also ==
- List of dukes in the peerage of Spain
- List of current grandees of Spain
