= Infanta Maria Luisa, Duchess of Talavera =

Infanta María Luisa
- Duchess of Talavera de la Reina
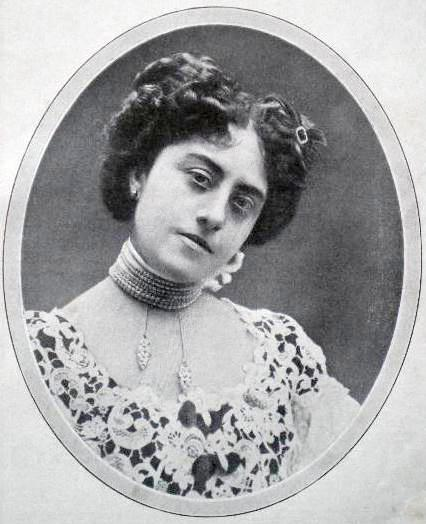
- Maria Luisa de Silva in May 1914 as the new fiancée of Infante Ferdinand
- Born: 3 December 1880; Madrid, Spain
- Died: 2 April 1955 (aged 74); Madrid, Spain
- Spouse: Prince Ferdinand of Bavaria, Infante of Spain (m. 1914)
Names
- María Luisa de Silva y Fernández de Henestrosa
- House: House of Silva
- Father: Luis de Silva y Fernández de Córdoba, 10th Count of Pie de Concha
- Mother: María de los Dolores Fernández de Henestrosa y Fernández de Córdoba

Infanta María Luisa, Duchess of Talavera de la Reina (née: María Luisa de Silva y Fernández de Henestrosa; 3 December 1880 – 2 April 1955) was a Spanish aristocrat and the second wife of Infante Ferdinand of Spain, Prince of Bavaria, who was a first cousin and (former) brother-in law of King Alfonso XIII. She was the second child and elder daughter of Luis de Silva y Fernandez de Henestrosa, 10th Count of Pie de Concha and his wife, María de los Dolores Fernández de Henestrosa, herself the daughter of the 9th Marquess of Villadarias.

On the occasion of her marriage to Prince Ferdinand of Bavaria, Infante of Spain, in 1914 King Alfonso XIII created her Duchess of Talavera de la Reina, with the dignity of Grandee and the style of Highness. The couple married on 1 October 1914, in Guipúzcoa, Spain.

Maria Luisa was Ferdinand's second wife, adopting the children of her husband with Infanta Maria Teresa, sister of the king. For this reason, at the age of 46, on 17 May 1927, King Alfonso XIII granted her the title of Infanta de gracia (by "royal grace") and elevated her treatment to Royal Highness, allowing her to fully share her husband's title and rank:

According to the Royal Decree: "Desiring on this date to give evidence of My Royal esteem to Her Highness the Most Serene Lady Doña María Luisa de Silva y Fernández de Henestrosa, Duchess of Talavera de la Reina, second wife of His Highness Infante Fernando of Bavaria and Bourbon and of My gratitude for the loving disposition with which she has assisted in the education and care of the children of My most beloved sister Infanta María Teresa, I hereby grant upon her the rank, honours and style corresponding to the condition of Infanta of Spain".

Although her husband was a patrilineal descendant of Ludwig I of Bavaria, he had become a naturalised Spaniard in 1905 in conjunction with his first marriage (being the third generation of his cadet branch of the royal House of Wittelsbach to live as modern princes étrangers in Spain). Four days after Doña Maria de Silva was made a duchess in Spain, her fiancé renounced his dynastic rights as a member of the Bavarian royal family, 29 June 1914, completing the transfer of the prince's allegiance from Germany to Spain shortly before the assassination of Archduke Franz Ferdinand led to World War I, although the legalities and logistics of the inter-dynastic re-arrangement of assets were disrupted and protracted by the war.

Infante Ferdinand, Prince of Bavaria and Infanta Maria Luisa, Duchess of Talavera de la Reina, had no children. Thus, on her death in 1955 her dukedom passed to her nephew, Juan Manuel de Silva y Goyeneche, 21st Marquess of Zahara and 13th Count of Pie de Concha.

== Titles, styles and honours ==
- 3 December 1880 – 25 June 1914: Doña María Luisa de Silva y Fernández de Henestrosa
- 25 June 1914 – 1 October 1914: Her Excellency The Duchess of Talavera de la Reina, Grandee of Spain
- 1 October 1914 – 17 May 1927: Her Highness The Duchess of Talavera de la Reina, Grandee of Spain
- 17 May 1927 – 2 April 1955: Her Royal Highness Infanta Doña María Luisa, Duchess of Talavera de la Reina

=== Honours ===
- Dame of the Order of Queen Maria Luisa (1914)
- Dame Grand Cross of the Sovereign Military Order of Malta
- Honorary Protector of the Royal Collegiate Body of Knights of the Nobility of Madrid (1927)
- Dame of the Real Maestranza de Caballería de Sevilla (1928).
