= Princess Maria Amelia of Orléans =

Princess of Orléans and Infanta of Spain

Maria Amelia of Spain
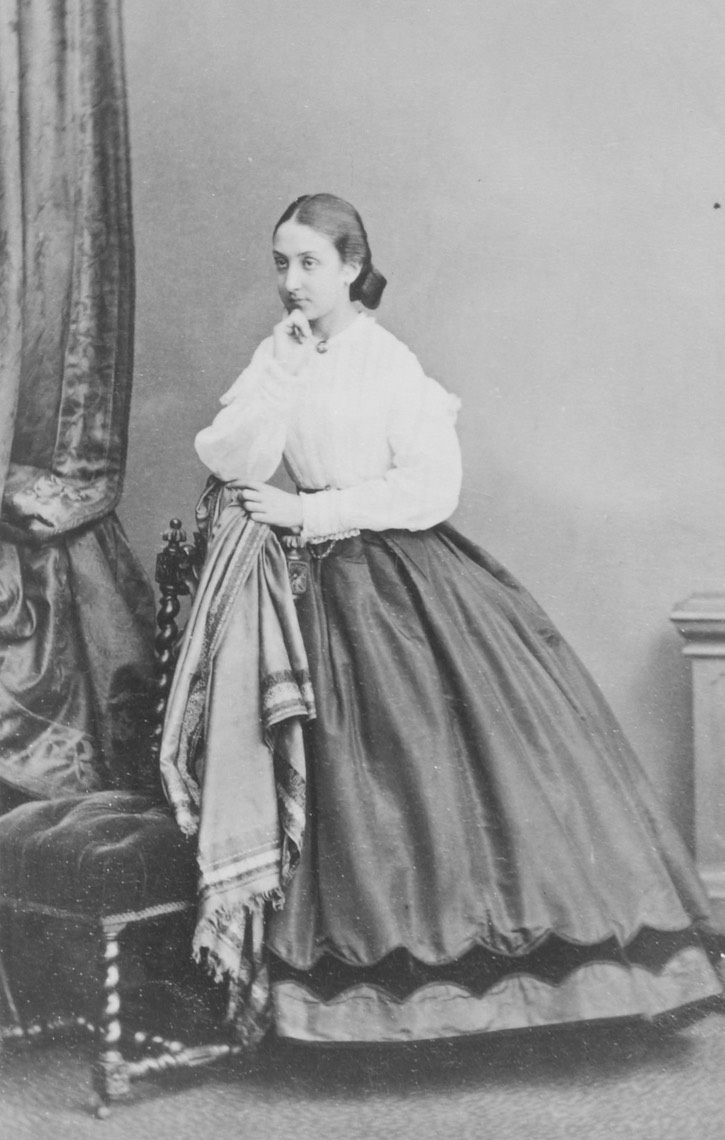
- Maria Amelia in December 1869
- Born: 28 August 1851; Palace of San Telmo, Seville, Spain
- Died: 9 November 1870 (aged 19); Palace of San Telmo, Seville, Spain
- Burial: Infantes Pantheon, Royal Monastery of San Lorenzo de El Escorial, Spain
Names
- Spanish: María Amalia Luisa Enriqueta; French: Marie Amélie Louise Henriette
- House: Orleans
- Father: Prince Antoine, Duke of Montpensier
- Mother: Infanta Luisa Fernanda of Spain

Princess Maria Amelia of Orléans, Infanta of Spain (full name: María Amalia Luisa Enriqueta 28 August 1851 – 9 November 1870) was a Princess of Orléans and Infanta of Spain who was the second child of Antoine, Duke of Montpensier and Infanta Luisa Fernanda, Duchess of Montpensier. She was a paternal granddaughter of Louis Philippe I and maternal granddaughter of Ferdinand VII of Spain.

== Biography ==
=== Family ===
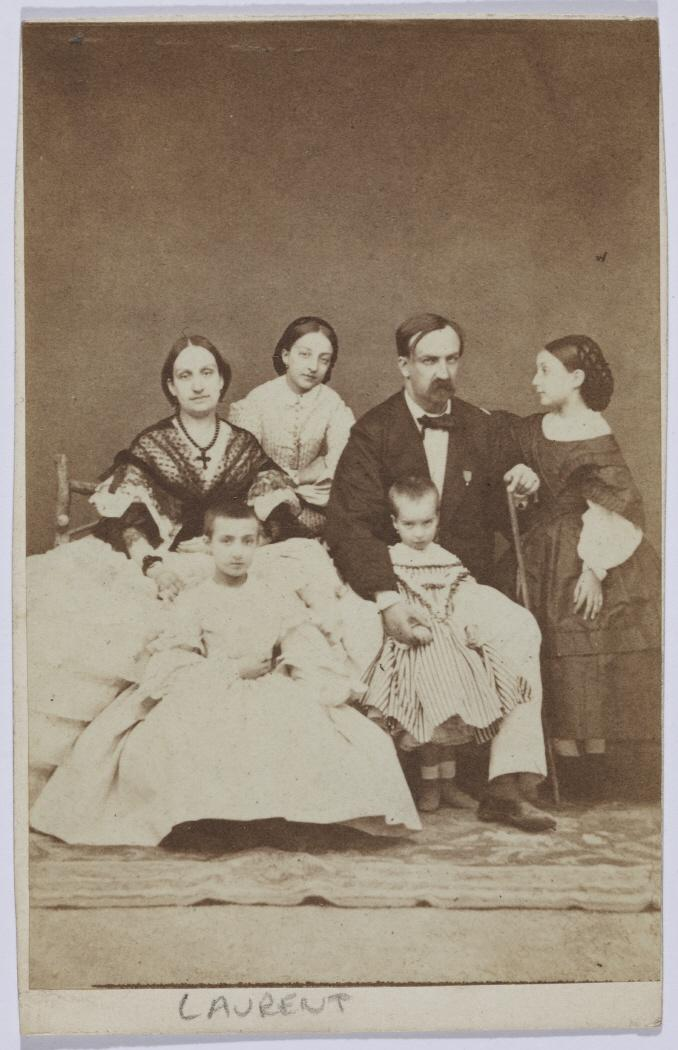
Maria Amelia along with her parents and siblings c. 1860

Maria Amelia was the second daughter and second child of Antoine, Duke of Montpensier and Infanta Luisa Fernanda, Duchess of Montpensier. Her father was the youngest son of Louis Philippe I and Maria Amalia of Naples and Sicily while her mother was the younger daughter of Ferdinand VII of Spain and Maria Christina of the Two Sicilies. She had nine siblings, of whom only four survived to adulthood.

=== Life and death ===
Maria Amelia's parents had settled in Seville after the 1848 revolution that had deposed her paternal grandfather, Louis Philippe I.

Maria Amelia was born on 28 August 1851 at the Palace of San Telmo. Before her birth, her aunt Queen Isabella II decreed that whether the child was a son or a daughter they would be granted to the title of Infante of Spain. At the end of September 1851, she was presented in an official religious ceremony where her parents and the political and religious authorities in the city participated.

Maria Amelia, like her siblings received an education at the family Palace of San Telmo also having trips to Great Britain and France during this time. She spent most of her life in the family palace, and was fond of piano and of drawing as she had demonstrated talent in it.

Following the 1868 glorious revolution, Maria Amelia, along with her family moved to Lisbon where her father had close connections with the Portuguese royal family. A marriage between Maria and Infante Augusto of Portugal was contemplated, but did not happen. This was said to be because she was in love with her first cousin, Prince Ferdinand of Orleans, Duke of Alençon, but she did not end up marrying him either.

The exile in Lisbon was followed by another in France, where the family settled in the Château de Randan in Auvergne. The family returned to Spain in 1870 and settled in Seville.

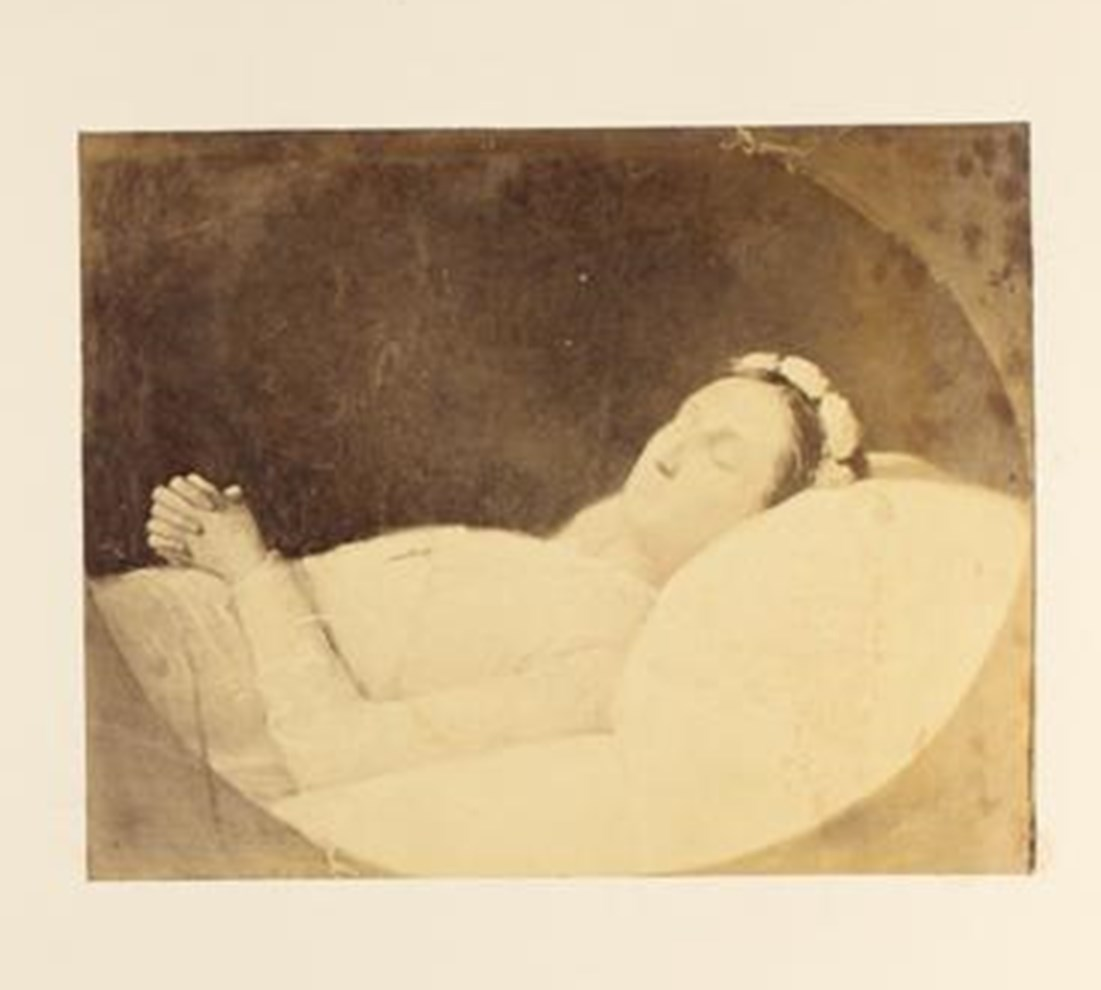
Post Mortem of Maria Amelia c. November 1870

Shortly after the return to Spain, Maria Amelia became seriously ill. On 9 November 1870, she died in the Palace of San Telmo at the age of 19 and was buried in the Infantes Pantheon of the Royal Monastery of San Lorenzo de El Escorial.
