= Princess Beatrice of Saxe-Coburg and Gotha =

Duchess of Galliera (1884–1966)

Princess Beatrice
- Duchess of Galliera
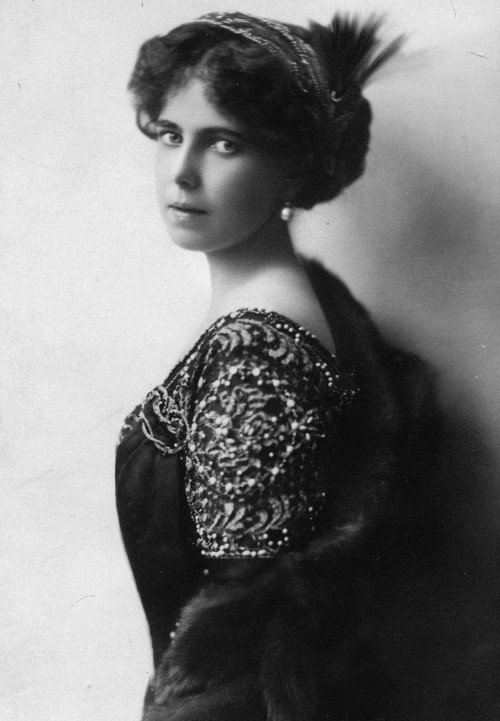
- Photograph, c. 1904
- Born: Princess Beatrice of Edinburgh; 20 April 1884; Eastwell Park, Kent, England
- Died: 13 July 1966 (aged 82); El Botánico, Sanlúcar de Barrameda, Spain
- Burial: Capuchin Monastery of Sanlúcar de Barrameda
- Spouse: Infante Alfonso, Duke of Galliera (m. 1909)
- Issue: Infante Álvaro, Duke of Galliera; Prince Alonso; Prince Ataúlfo
Names
- Beatrice Leopoldine Victoria
- House: Saxe-Coburg and Gotha
- Father: Alfred, Duke of Saxe-Coburg and Gotha
- Mother: Grand Duchess Maria Alexandrovna of Russia

Princess Beatrice of Saxe-Coburg and Gotha (Beatrice Leopoldine Victoria; 20 April 1884 – 13 July 1966) was a member of the British royal family, a male-line granddaughter of Queen Victoria. She later married into the Spanish royal family, and was the wife of Prince Alfonso de Orleans y Borbón, Infante of Spain, a first cousin of Alfonso XIII of Spain.

== Early life ==
Beatrice was born on 20 April 1884 at Eastwell Park, Kent. Her father was Prince Alfred, Duke of Edinburgh, the second son of Queen Victoria and Albert, Prince Consort. Her mother was Grand Duchess Maria Alexandrovna of Russia, the only surviving daughter of Alexander II of Russia and Princess Marie of Hesse and by Rhine. She was called "Baby Bee" by her family.

She was baptised at Eastwell House on 17 May 1884 by the Rev. William Lloyd (her father's chaplain); her godparents were Princess Beatrice of the United Kingdom (her paternal aunt), the Duchess of Albany (her paternal uncle's wife, represented by her mother), and William I, German Emperor (represented by her father).

Beatrice spent much of her childhood in Malta, where her father was serving in the Royal Navy. On 22 August 1893, following the death of Ernest II, Duke of Saxe-Coburg and Gotha, Beatrice's father's uncle, the vacant duchy fell to her father, as Albert Edward, then Prince of Wales and future King Edward VII of the United Kingdom, had renounced his rights to the duchy in favor of succession to the British crown. The Duke and Duchess of Edinburgh therefore travelled shortly afterwards to Coburg with their five children, where they took up residence. At the end of July 1899, she received the sacrament of confirmation at the Church of St. John in Oeslau, a village near Coburg.

She was a bridesmaid at the wedding of their paternal cousins the Duke and Duchess of York (the future King George V and Queen Mary) on 6 July 1893.

Bee's eldest sister, Queen Marie of Romania, described her in her memoirs:

Baby Bee had always been a child of exceptional intelligence. Being the youngest, Mamma guarded and adored her with special fervour, but for all that Baby Bee was a forerunner of the youth today. In spite of all Mamma's love and care, Baby Bee generally outwitted her anxious parent and had most things her own way.

== Marriage prospects ==
In 1902, Beatrice had a romance with Russian Grand Duke Michael, the younger brother of Tsar Nicholas II, and at that time the heir presumptive to the Imperial Throne. She began receiving letters from him in September 1902 and, although he was a Russian Grand Duke and she now a German Princess, they corresponded in English, and he nicknamed her "Sima". However she was prevented from marrying the Grand Duke as the Russian Orthodox Church forbade the marriage of first cousins. Although such marriages had been allowed previously in the House of Romanov (Grand Duchess Catherine Pavlovna, whose hand was denied to Napoleon I, was twice allowed to wed first cousins; her descendants became the Russian branch of the Dukes of Oldenburg), the devout Nicholas II, official head of Russia's church, refused to relax the rules for the sake of his brother.

In November 1903, Michael wrote to Beatrice telling her that he could not marry her. The situation was aggravated by a letter Beatrice then received from her elder sister Victoria Melita ("Ducky"), in which Michael was blamed for having callously initiated the doomed romance (when, a couple of years later Ducky, having divorced her first cousin Ernest Louis, Grand Duke of Hesse, was told that remarriage to another first cousin, Grand Duke Kirill Vladimirovich, would likewise be forbidden by the Tsar, she refused to take no for an answer; the couple eloped into exile). The humiliated Beatrice was sent to Egypt to recover from heartbreak, but pined and wrote reproachful letters to Michael until 1905.

Beatrice was then rumoured to be intending to marry Alfonso XIII of Spain, but this proved to be a false rumour also as he married her cousin Victoria Eugenie of Battenberg in 1906. It was at their wedding that Beatrice met a cousin of King Alfonso, Alfonso de Orleans y Borbón (12 November 1886 Madrid, Spain – 10 August 1975), Infante of Spain, 5th Duke of Galliera. The Spanish government objected to an infante's proposed match with a British Princess who, unlike Queen Victoria Eugenie, had not agreed to convert to Roman Catholicism: the King was obliged to make clear that, should the wedding take place, the couple would have to live in exile.

Nonetheless, Beatrice and Alfonso married in a Roman Catholic and Lutheran ceremony at Coburg on 15 July 1909. The couple settled in Coburg until, in 1912, Alfonso and Beatrice were allowed to return to Spain and his rank of Infante was restored.

In 1913, Beatrice was received into the Roman Catholic Church.

=== Scandal and exile ===
During King Alfonso XIII's unhappy marriage, he had numerous affairs and dalliances, some of which produced illegitimate children. He allegedly also made advances toward Beatrice, which she rebuffed. The King expelled her and her husband from Spain in 1916 under the pretext of sending Infante Alfonso on a mission to Switzerland. At the same time, the King's circle of friends, who despised both Beatrice and Queen Ena, started to spread claims that Beatrice had been expelled because of her bad behaviour. Beatrice and her spouse were allowed to return to Spain in 1924.

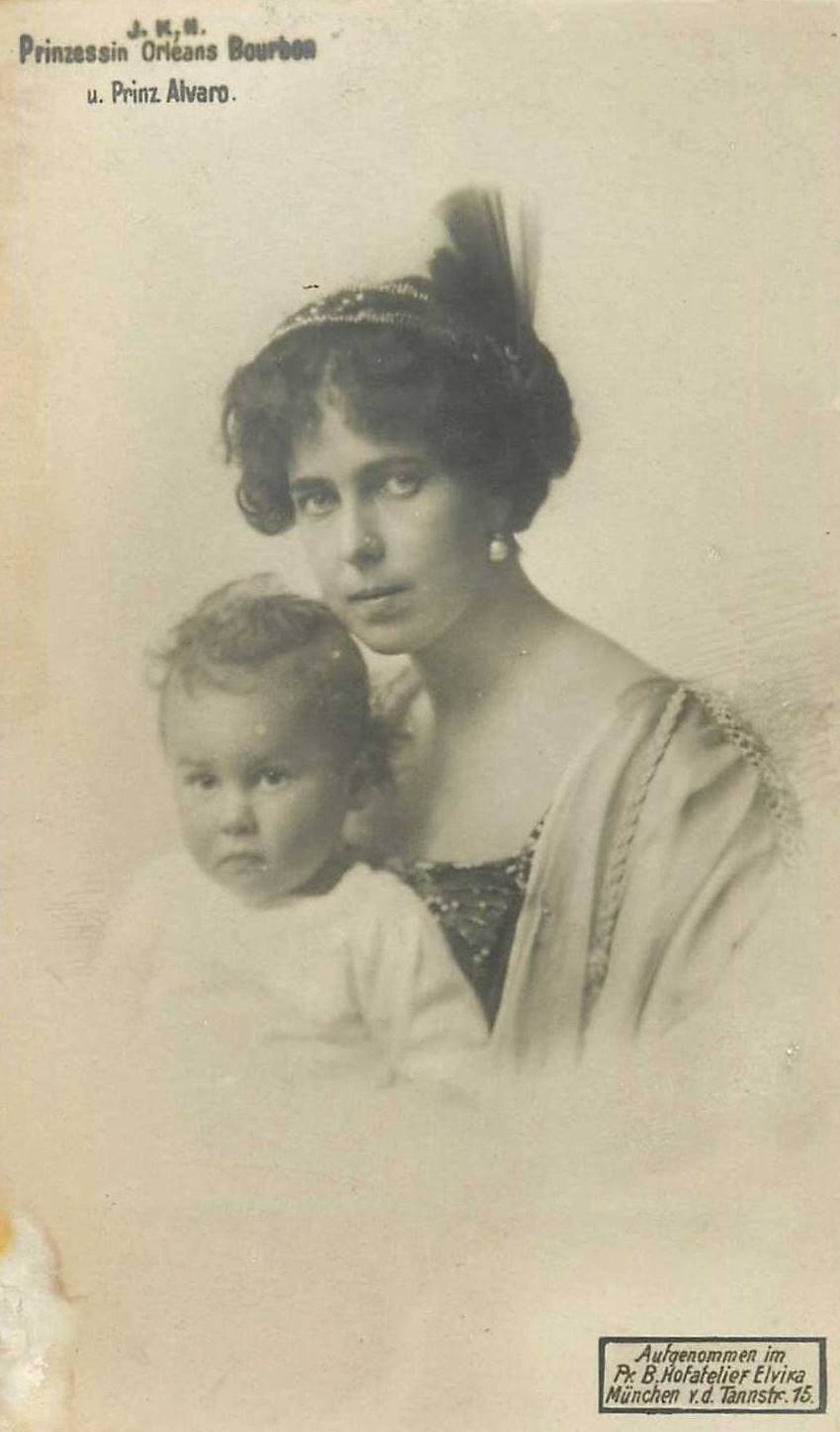
Princess Beatrice and her eldest son

The couple had three sons:

- Alvaro Antonio Fernando Carlos Felipe (20 April 1910 Coburg, Germany–22 August 1997)
- Alonso María Cristino Justo (28 May 1912 Madrid, Spain–18 November 1936 Spain); Killed in action during the Spanish Civil War
- Ataúlfo Carlos Alejandro Isabelo (20 October 1913 Madrid, Spain–4 October 1974 Málaga, Spain)

== Civil War ==
The family moved to England, where their three sons were educated at Winchester College. The Spanish royal family eventually relented, and Beatrice and her family were allowed to return to Spain where they established their home at an estate in Sanlúcar de Barrameda.

The 1930s were an unhappy time for the family, as the collapse of the Spanish monarchy and the subsequent civil war led to the loss of much of the family's wealth. After the establishment of the Second Spanish Republic in 1931, King Alfonso and his family fled into exile in Italy. In the years that followed, the political situation in Spain worsened as various groups wrestled for power. By the late-1930s, the conflicts had erupted into all-out civil war. Beatrice and Alfonso lost their estate during the war and the couple's middle son, Alonso, was killed fighting for the fascist forces.

== Later life ==
Beatrice died at her estate of El Botánico in Sanlúcar de Barrameda on 13 July 1966. Her husband survived her by nine years. Their son Ataulfo died, unmarried, in 1974. Their only grandchildren are the children of Prince Alvaro.

At the time of her death, Beatrice was the last surviving child of Prince Alfred and Grand Duchess Maria Alexandrovna.

== Arms ==
British coat of arms

Spanish coat of arms
(As Duchess of Galliera)

== Honours ==
- Spain: Dame of the Order of Queen Maria Luisa, 18 March 1912
- Two Sicilies: Dame Grand Cross of Justice of the Sacred Military Constantinian Order of Saint George

== Ancestry ==
Ancestors of Princess Beatrice of Saxe-Coburg and Gotha

8. Ernest I, Duke of Saxe-Coburg and Gotha
4. Prince Albert of Saxe-Coburg and Gotha
9. Princess Louise of Saxe-Gotha-Altenburg
2. Alfred, Duke of Saxe-Coburg and Gotha
10. Prince Edward, Duke of Kent and Strathearn
5. Victoria of the United Kingdom
11. Princess Victoria of Saxe-Coburg-Saalfeld
1. Princess Beatrice of Saxe-Coburg and Gotha
12. Nicholas I of Russia
6. Alexander II of Russia
13. Princess Charlotte of Prussia
3. Grand Duchess Maria Alexandrovna of Russia
14. Louis II, Grand Duke of Hesse and by Rhine
7. Princess Marie of Hesse and by Rhine
15. Princess Wilhelmine of Baden
