= Infanta Luisa Fernanda of Spain =

Duchess of Montpensier (1832–1897)

Infanta Luisa Fernanda
- Duchess of Montpensier
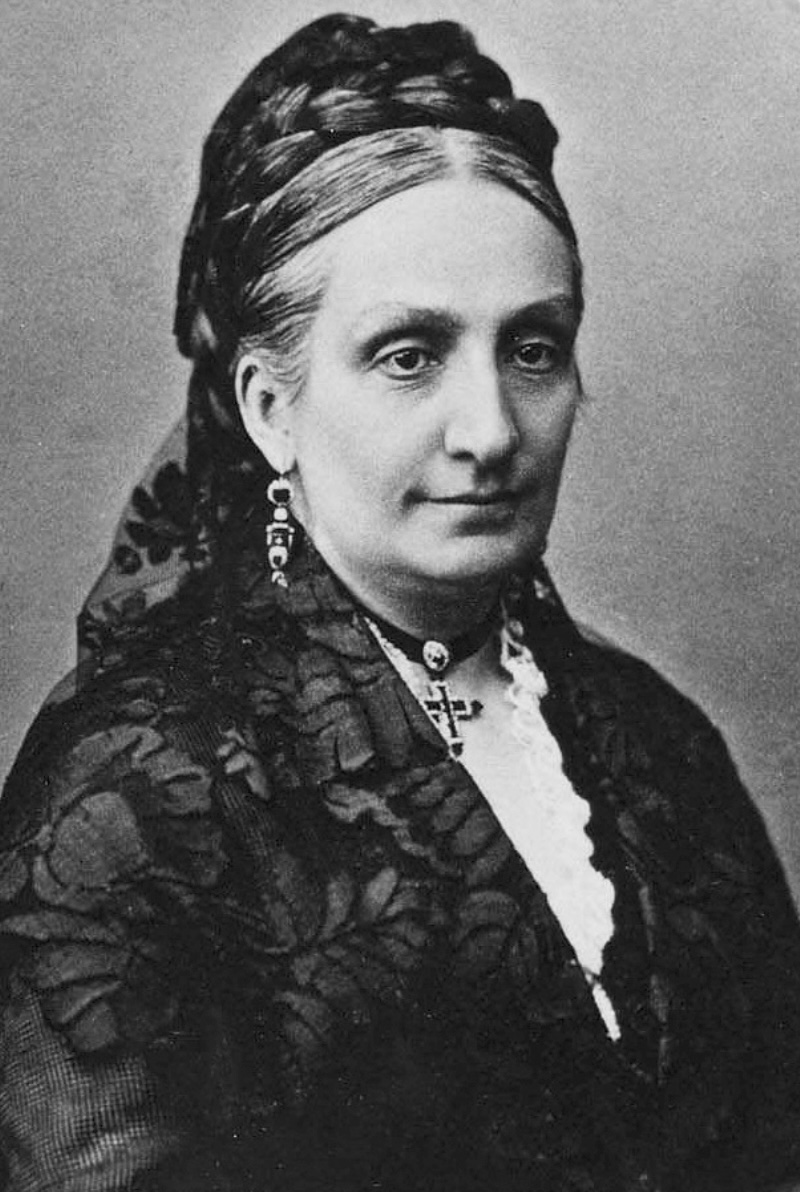
- Born: 30 January 1832; Royal Palace of Madrid, Spain
- Died: 2 February 1897 (aged 65); Palace of San Telmo, Seville, Spain
- Burial: 2 February 1897; Infantes Pantheon, Royal Monastery of San Lorenzo de El Escorial, Spain
- Spouse: Prince Antoine, Duke of Montpensier (m. 1846; died 1890)
- Issue Among others...: Princess Isabel, Countess of Paris; Princess Maria Amelia; Princess María Cristina; Mercedes, Queen of Spain; Infante Antonio, Duke of Galliera
Names
- Spanish: María Luisa Fernanda de Borbón y Borbón-Dos Sicilias
- House: Bourbon
- Father: Ferdinand VII of Spain
- Mother: Maria Christina of the Two Sicilies
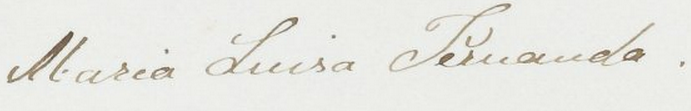
- Signature

Infanta María Luisa Fernanda of Spain, Duchess of Montpensier (French: Marie Louise Ferdinande; 30 January 1832 – 2 February 1897) was the younger daughter of King Ferdinand VII and Queen Maria Christina of Spain.

During the reign of her elder sister Queen Isabella II, Luisa Fernanda was heir presumptive to the Spanish throne from 1833 until 1851. She became Duchess of Montpensier by her 1846 marriage to her first cousin once removed, Prince Antoine, Duke of Montpensier.

== Biography ==
=== Heiress presumptive ===
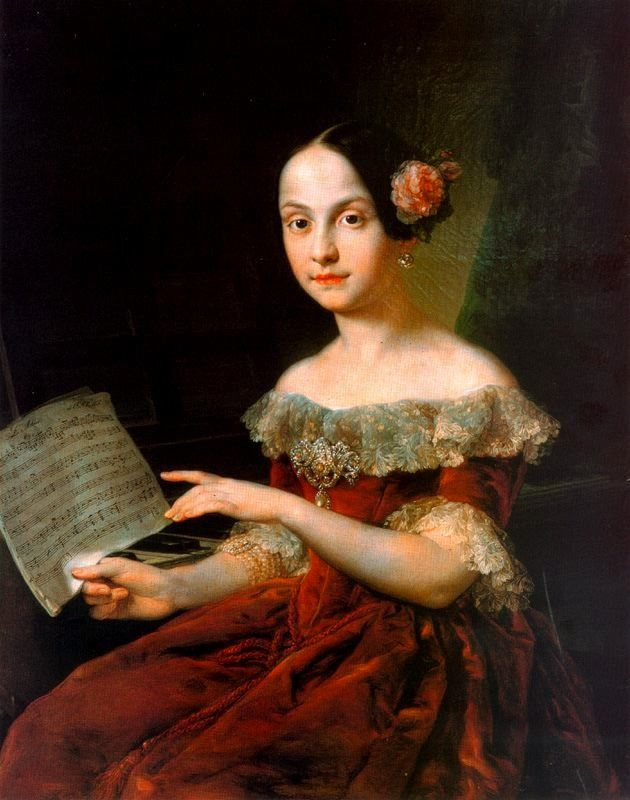
Luisa Fernanda as a young girl (by Vicente López Portaña, 1842, Alcázar of Seville collection)

María Luisa Fernanda was born on 30 January 1832 in the Royal Palace of Madrid as the second and youngest daughter of King Ferdinand VII of Spain and his fourth wife and niece, Maria Christina of the Two Sicilies.

After her elder sister, Isabella, succeeded to the throne upon the death of their father on 29 September 1833, Infanta Luisa Fernanda was heir presumptive to the crown from 1833 until 1851, when Isabella's first surviving daughter was born.

=== Marriage ===
Royal styles of Infanta Luisa Fernanda of Spain, Duchess of Montpensier
- Reference style: Her Royal Highness
- Spoken style: Your Royal Highness

The question of the future marriages of the Spanish monarch and her heir presumptive was a matter of considerable political interest in the 1840s. In the midst of a series of political intrigues and controversies between France, Spain, and the United Kingdom, Luisa Fernanda was engaged to the Duke of Montpensier, the youngest son of Louis Philippe I, King of the French, who also was Luisa's mother's first cousin.

Luisa Fernanda, only 14 years old, and Antoine, 22, had their nuptials on 10 October 1846 as a double wedding with Isabella and Francisco de Asís, Duke of Cádiz. The young Antoine was elevated to the rank of an Infante of Spain. At the time of the wedding, the groom spoke no Spanish and the bride spoke no French, making it impossible for the newlyweds to understand one another. Nervous at the prospect of being alone with her new husband, the young Infanta had hidden a lady-in-waiting behind the curtains of her bedroom, whom Antoine found and shouted at for spying on them.

=== Later life ===
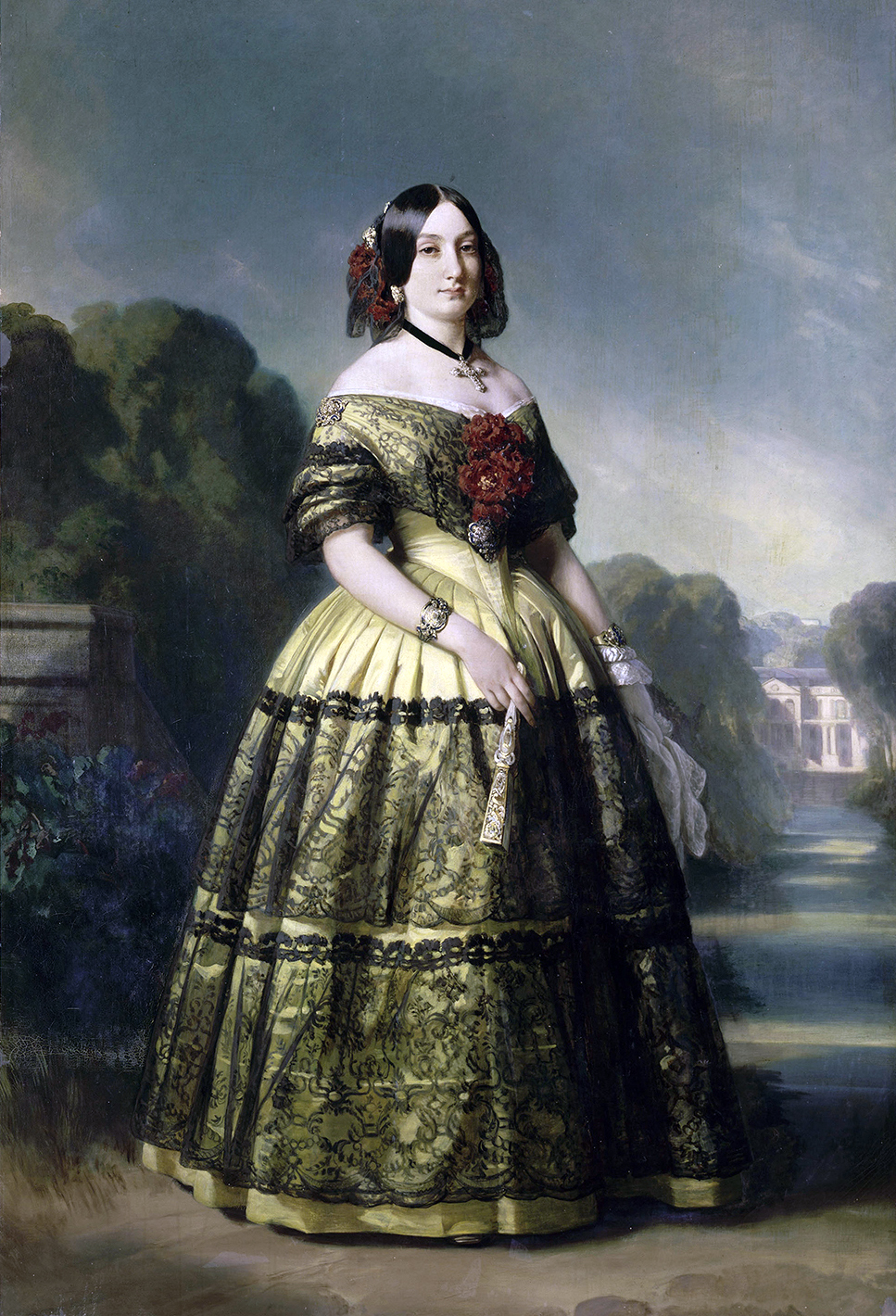
Luisa Fernanda in 1847 (portrait by Franz Xaver Winterhalter, Palace of Versailles)

On 22 October 1846, the Duke of Montpensier and his wife set out on the return journey to France. The couple settled in Paris where they divided their time between their luxurious apartments at the Tuileries Palace in central Paris and the Château de Vincennes on the outskirts of the city. The relations of the Montpensiers with the rest of the Orleáns family was not without friction since it was decided that, in her capacity as heir to the Spanish throne, Luisa Fernanda would enjoy a higher rank than the other princesses.

When Antoine's father was deposed by the French Revolution of 1848, the couple were forced into exile. After a brief stay in England, they returned to Spain where they settled in Seville. The relationship between Queen Isabella and her sister was tense, due to Antoine's conspiracies against the queen. The same year, the then 16-year-old Luisa Fernanda gave birth to their first child, Maria Isabel.

After Queen Isabella was deposed by the Spanish Revolution in 1868, the family went into exile. Luisa Fernanda returned to Seville years later, already widowed, where she died. She is buried at Escorial.

== Legacy ==
The Parque de María Luisa that stretches along the Guadalquivir River in Seville was named after her.

== Issue ==
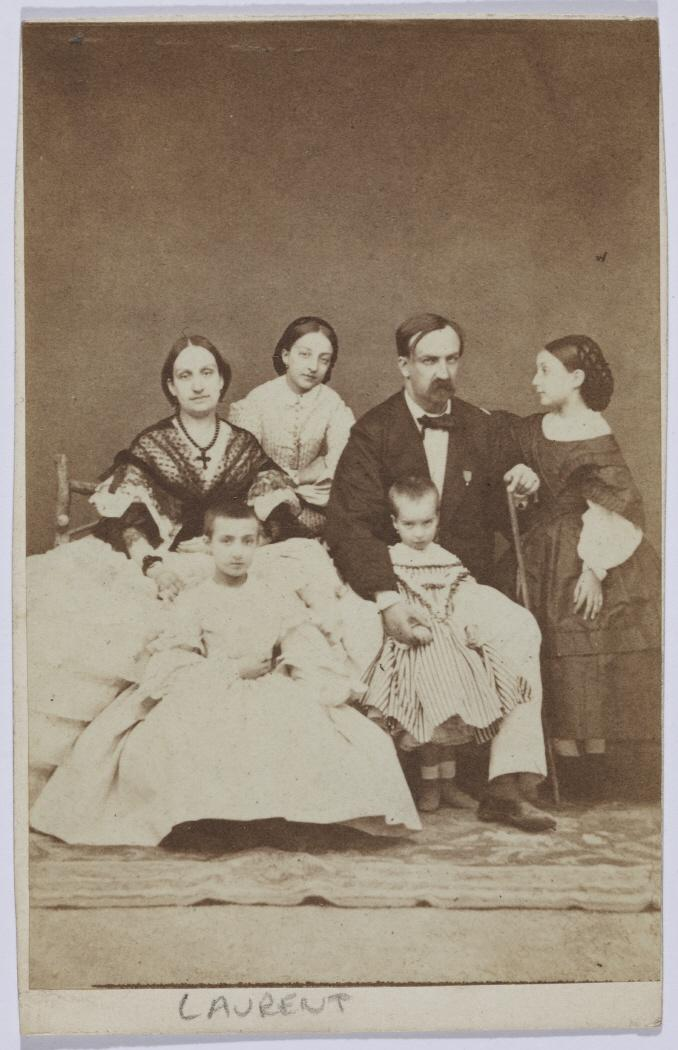
Luisa Fernada with her husband and children (photograph by Jean Laurent, circa 1860, Museum of Romanticism)

Luisa Fernanda and Antoine had ten children, but only five of them reached adulthood.

- Princess Maria Isabel (1848–1919); married her first cousin Prince Philippe, Count of Paris (1838–1894), the French claimant, and became known as Madame the comtesse de Paris. She had several children, including Princess Louise of Orléans, the maternal grandmother of King Juan Carlos I.
- Princess Maria Amelia (1851–1870)
- Princess Maria Cristina (1852–1879); after her younger sister Mercedes died, she was engaged to King Alfonso XII (1857–1885), five years her junior, but she died before the wedding.
- Infanta Maria de la Regla (1856–1861)
- Stillborn child (1857–1857)
- Infante Fernando (1859–1873)
- Infanta Maria de las Mercedes (1860–1878), otherwise Princess Marie des Graces d'Orleans-Montpensier, who married her first cousin Alfonso XII and is historically known as Mercedes, Queen of Spain. Without issue.
- Infante Felipe Raimundo Maria (1862–1864)
- Infante Antonio, Duke of Galliera (1866–1930); became Duke of Galliera in Italy. He married his first cousin Infanta Eulalia of Spain (1864–1958), daughter of Isabella II, and had two sons: Infante Alfonso and Infante Luis Fernando.
- Infante Luis Maria Felipe Antonio (1867–1874)

=== Descendants ===
Of all her children, only Marie Isabelle and Antonio survived to adulthood. Through Antonio, the now non-royal line of dukes of Galliera continues. Alfonso's grandchildren lost royal status due to non-dynastic marriages. The current Duke of Galliera is Alfonso's great-grandson, Don Alfonso Francesco de Orléans-Borbón y Ferarra-Pignatelli.

Through Maria Isabel, she became great-grandmother of King Manuel II of Portugal, Prince Amedeo, Duke of Aosta, Prince Aimone, Duke of Aosta, and Luis Filipe, Prince Royal of Portugal; great-great-grandmother of King Juan Carlos I of Spain and Henri, Count of Paris.

== Arms ==
Heraldry of Infanta Luisa Fernanda of Spain, Duchess of Montpensier

Coat of arms of Infanta Luisa Fernanda

Arms of alliance of Infanta Luisa Fernanda and her husband

Arms as Duchess Dowager

== Ancestry ==
Ancestors of Infanta Luisa Fernanda of Spain

8. Charles III of Spain
4. Charles IV of Spain (= 14)
9. Maria Amalia of Saxony
2. Ferdinand VII of Spain
10. Philip, Duke of Parma
5. Maria Luisa of Parma (= 15)
11. Louise Élisabeth of France
1. Luisa Fernanda of Spain
12. Ferdinand I of the Two Sicilies
6. Francis I of the Two Sicilies
13. Maria Carolina of Austria
3. Maria Christina of the Two Sicilies
14. Charles IV of Spain (= 4)
7. Maria Isabella of Spain
15. Maria Luisa of Parma (= 5)
