= Infante Antonio, Duke of Galliera =

Spanish infante (1866–1930)

Infante Antonio
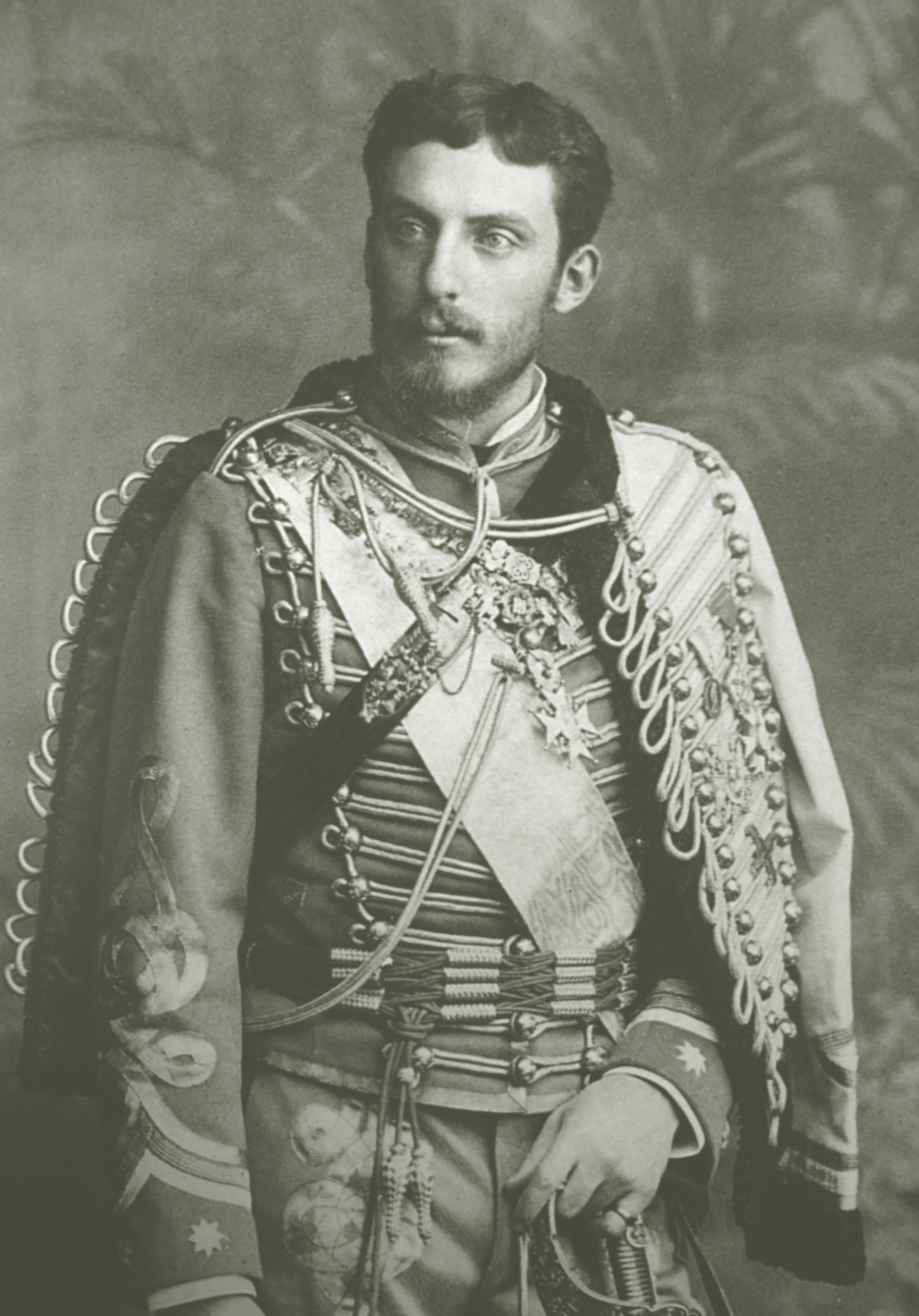

Duke of Galliera
- Tenure: 4 July 1890 – 24 December 1930
- Predecessor: Prince Antoine
- Successor: Infante Alfonso
- Born: 23 February 1866; Seville, Spain
- Died: 24 December 1930 (aged 64); Paris, France
- Burial: El Escorial
- Spouse: Infanta Eulalia of Spain (m. 1886)
- Issue: Infante Alfonso, Duke of Galliera; Luís Fernando de Orleans y Borbón
Names
- Antonio María Luis Felipe Juan Florencio
- House: Orléans-Galliera
- Father: Prince Antoine, Duke of Montpensier
- Mother: Infanta Luisa Fernanda of Spain

Infante Antonio, Duke of Galliera (Antonio Maria Luis Felipe Juan Florencio de Orleans y Borbón; 23 February 1866 – 24 December 1930), was a member of the Spanish and French royal families. He was the son of Prince Antoine, Duke of Montpensier, and Infanta Luisa Fernanda of Spain. Infante Antonio was a grandson of King Louis Philippe I of France on his father's side and King Ferdinand VII of Spain on his mother's side.

== Early life ==
Antonio was the only surviving son of Prince Antoine, Duke of Montpensier, and his wife Infanta Luisa Fernanda of Spain. Through his father, he was a grandson of King Louis Philippe I of France and his wife Princess Maria Amalia of the Two Sicilies. Through his mother, he was a grandson of King Ferdinand VII of Spain and his wife Princess Maria Christina of the Two Sicilies.

Antonio was born in Seville, shortly before the end of the reign of his aunt Queen Isabella II of Spain. Due to the Glorious Revolution of 1868 which chased his family from Spain, he spent most of his childhood abroad. Yet his ambitious and liberal father Antoine, Duke of Montpensier, had some relations with the revolutionaries who forced him to flee his country of adoption. In fact, the uprising was prepared with his money and he hoped to be elected king in exchange. However, the attempt failed and the banishment of the House of Orléans was confirmed by the Spanish interim government.

In December 1874, the coup of General Arsenio Martínez Campos allowed for the restoration of the Spanish monarchy and the young Alfonso XII was made king following the renunciation of his mother. A few months later, the Orléans were pardoned and Antonio went to live with his family in Seville in Palacio San Telmo. In 1878, King Alfonso XII married Antonio's older sister Mercedes, and the reconciliation of the Spanish Orléans and Bourbons was complete.

== Marriage and issue ==
On 6 March 1886 in Madrid, Antonio married his cousin Infanta Eulalia of Spain, the daughter of Queen Isabella II of Spain and her husband Francis, Duke of Cádiz.

Antonio and Eulalia had two sons:

- Alfonso, Infante of Spain and 5th Duke of Galliera (12 November 1886 – 6 August 1975);
- Luis Fernando, Infante of Spain (5 November 1888 – 20 June 1945);

Antonio's marriage gave him the opportunity to play some official role in the court in Madrid. In 1892, he participated in his wife's trip to Cuba and the United States for the celebrations of the 400th anniversary of the discovery of America by Christopher Columbus. Antonio, however, was fickle and extravagant, while his wife was a strong and cultured woman who refused to bear the humiliations caused by her husband. They separated shortly after they returned to Spain from the United States. On 31 May 1901, they signed a legal separation before the Spanish Consul General in Paris.

== Duke of Galliera ==
In 1895, King Umberto I of Italy recognised Antonio as the heir of the title Duke of Galliera. The legitimate heir of the title, Philipp von Ferrary (1850–1917) refused to use it and Antonio brought forward his close relations with the family of the last Duchess of Galliera, Maria of Brignole-Sale (1812–1888) to obtain the title.

In 1900, Antonio met Marie-Louise Le Manac'h (1869–1949), widow of Simon Guggenheim (a Parisian businessman died in 1900, namesake of the American millionaire Simon Guggenheim), at the Savoy Hotel in London. Immediately seduced by the young Breton, Antonio began a new love affair, public in London, Paris and Seville. However, he could not remain faithful even to his mistress, and in 1906 he grew weary of the woman he had gradually introduced in the high society. Antonio was not able to come out of this relationship completely unharmed since his mistress, furious at being dismissed, broke a few of his teeth by hitting him with her umbrella.

Throughout these years, Antonio lived an expensive lifestyle and squandered the family fortune while his wife, from whom he was separated, lived in relative poverty. In 1919, his excessive spending forced him to sell his land in his Italian duchy.

Antonio died in comparative poverty in Paris in 1930. His remains were transferred to the Pantheon of the Princes in El Escorial.

== Arms ==
Heraldry of Infante Antonio of Spain, Duke of Galliera

Coat of arms of Infante Antonio, 4th Duke of Galliera

== Notes ==
Infante Antonio, Duke of Galliera House of Orléans Cadet branch of the House of Bourbon Born: 23 February 1866 Died: 24 December 1930
Italian nobility
Preceded by Prince Antoine, Duke of Montpensier	Duke of Galliera; 4 February 1890 – 24 December 1930	Succeeded by Infante Alfonso
