= Infanta Eulalia of Spain =

Spanish infanta (1864–1958)

- Duchess of Galliera
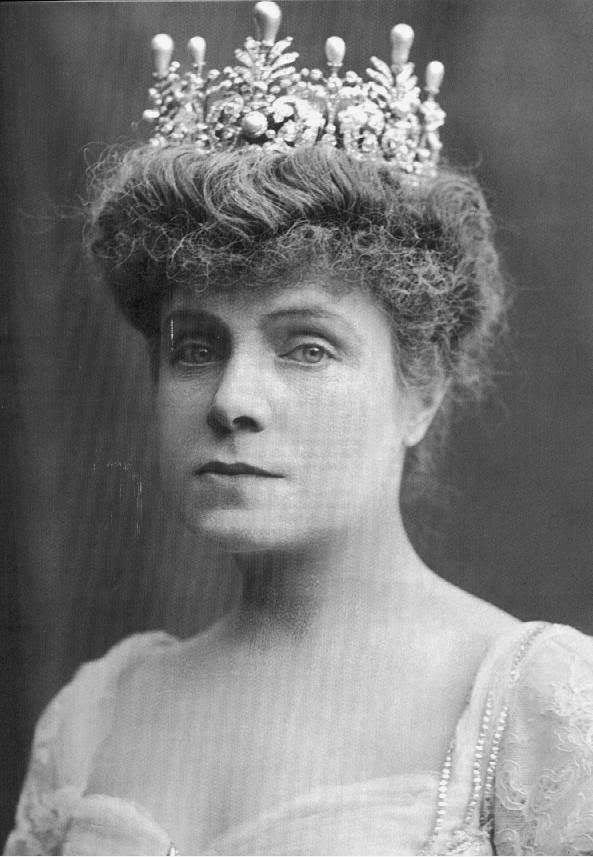
- Born: 12 February 1864; Madrid, Kingdom of Spain
- Died: 8 March 1958 (aged 94); Irun, Spanish State
- Burial: El Escorial
- Spouse: Infante Antonio, Duke of Galliera (m. 1886; died 1930)
- Issue: Infante Alfonso, Duke of Galliera; Infante Luis Fernando; Infanta Roberta
Names
- María Eulalia Francisca de Asís Margarita Roberta Isabel Francisca de Paula Cristina María de la Piedad de Borbón y Borbón
- House: Bourbon
- Father: Francisco, Duke of Cádiz
- Mother: Isabella II

Infanta Eulalia, Duchess of Galliera (María Eulalia Francisca de Asís Margarita Roberta Isabel Francisca de Paula Cristina María de la Piedad de Borbón y Borbón; 12 February 1864 – 8 March 1958), was the youngest and last surviving child of Queen Isabella II of Spain and her husband Francisco, Duke of Cádiz, and the youngest sister of King Alfonso XII. She authored memoirs that were controversial for their critical perspective and allegations about the political policies of various Spanish and foreign governments.

== Early life ==
Eulalia was born on 12 February 1864 in the Royal Palace of Madrid as the youngest of the five children born to Isabella II who survived to adulthood. She was baptised on 14 February 1864 with the names María Eulalia Francisca de Asís Margarita Roberta Isabel Francisca de Paula Cristina María de la Piedad. Her godparents were Robert I, Duke of Parma, and his sister Princess Margherita.

In 1868, Eulalia and her family were forced to leave Spain in the wake of the revolution. They lived in Paris, where Eulalia was educated. She received her first communion in Rome from Pope Pius IX.

In 1874, Eulalia's brother Alfonso was restored to the throne in place of their mother, Isabella II. Three years later, Eulalia returned to Spain. She lived at first in El Escorial with her mother, but she later moved to the Alcázar of Seville and then to Madrid.

== Marriage and issue ==
On 6 March 1886 in Madrid, Eulalia married her first cousin Infante Antonio de Orleans y Borbón, who succeeded his father as Duke of Galliera in 1890. He was a son of Prince Antoine, Duke of Montpensier, and Infanta Luisa Fernanda of Spain. The officiant was Cardinal Zeferino González y Díaz Tuñón, Archbishop of Seville. The wedding was delayed by several months on account of the death of Eulalia's brother, King Alfonso XII, aged only 27. Eulalia and Antonio spent their honeymoon at the Palacio Real de Aranjuez.

They had three children:

- Infante Alfonso, Duke of Galliera (12 November 1886 – 6 August 1975)
- Infante Luis Fernando (5 November 1888 – 20 June 1945)
- Infanta Roberta (12 March 1890; stillborn)

After the birth of her younger son, Eulalia lived apart from her husband. They separated in 1900 and she moved back to Paris. She maintained residences in Spain and France, and she visited England frequently. According to letters written by her husband to her grandmother, Maria Christina of the Two Sicilies, her affair with Georges Jametel, who was married to Marie of Mecklenburg, resulted in a pregnancy that Eulalia aborted.

== Visit to the United States ==
In May 1893, Eulalia visited the United States; her controversial visit to the World's Columbian Exposition in Chicago was particularly well-documented. She traveled first to Puerto Rico, then to Havana, in the Spanish Captaincy General of Cuba, being the first and only member of the Spanish Royal family to visit a Spanish colonial holding in the Americas. She was received with grand celebrations in Havana. and arrived in New York on 18 May on the Spanish Navy cruiser Infanta Isabel, before making her way to Washington, D.C., where she was received by President Grover Cleveland at the White House. She then proceeded to New York City. Eulalia was later admitted to membership in the Daughters of the American Revolution as a descendant of King Charles III of Spain.

== Publications ==
Eulalia was the author of several works that were controversial within royal circles, although she never ceased to have frequent contact with her relatives both in Spain and elsewhere.

In 1912, under the pseudonym Comtesse de Avila, Eulalia wrote Au fil de la vie (Paris: Société française d'Imprimerie et de Librarie, 1911), translated into English as The Thread of Life (New York: Duffield, 1912). The book expressed Eulalia's thoughts about education, the independence of women, the equality of classes, socialism, religion, marriage, prejudices, and traditions. Her nephew King Alfonso XIII telegraphed her to demand that she suspend the book's publication until he had seen it and received his permission to publish it. Eulalia refused to comply.

In May 1915, Eulalia wrote an article about the German Emperor William II for The Strand Magazine. The following month she published Court Life from Within (London: Cassell, 1915; reprinted New York: Dodd, Mead, 1915).

In August 1925, Eulalia wrote Courts and Countries After The War (London: Hutchinson, 1925; reprinted New York: Dodd, Mead, 1925). In this work she commented on the world political situation and articulated her belief that there could never be peace between France and Germany. She also made a celebrated observation about Benito Mussolini's Italy by reporting that she crossed the Italian frontier and heard the phrase "Il treno arriva all'orario" [the train is arriving on time], a boast often cited in connection with the Fascist regime at the time.

In 1935, Eulalia published her memoirs in French, the Mémoires de S.A.R. l'Infante Eulalie, 1868–1931 (Paris: Plon, 1935). In July 1936, they were published in English as Memoirs of a Spanish Princess, H.R.H. the Infanta Eulalia (London: Hutchinson, 1936; reprinted New York: W.W. Norton, 1937).

== Death ==
On 9 February 1958, Eulalia had a heart attack at her home in Irun. She died there on 8 March and is buried in the Pantheon of the Princes in El Escorial. She was the last surviving grandchild of Ferdinand VII of Spain.

== Honours ==
Royal styles of Infanta Eulalia of Spain, Duchess of Galleria
- Reference style: Her Royal Highness
- Spoken style: Your Royal Highness
- Alternative style: Doña

- (Restoration (Spain)) Spanish Royal Family: Knight Grand Cross of the Order of Charles III
- (Restoration (Spain)) Spanish Royal Family: 620th Dame Grand Cross of the Order of Queen Maria Luisa

== Ancestry ==
Ancestors of Infanta Eulalia of Spain

8. Charles IV of Spain
4. Francisco de Paula of Spain
9. Maria Luisa of Parma
2. Francisco de Asís of Spain
10. Francis I of the Two Sicilies
5. Luisa Carlotta of the Two Sicilies
11. María Isabel of Spain
1. Infanta María Eulalia of Spain
12. Charles IV of Spain (= 8)
6. Ferdinand VII of Spain
13. Maria Luisa of Parma (= 9)
3. Isabella II of Spain
14. Francis I of the Two Sicilies (= 10)
7. Maria Christina of the Two Sicilies
15. María Isabel of Spain (= 11)

== Bibliography ==
- García Luapre, Pilar. Eulalia de Borbón, Infanta de España: lo que no dijo en sus memorias. Madrid: Compañía Literaria, 1995. ISBN 84-8213-021-8.
