= Infante Alfonso, Duke of Galliera =

Spanish infante and military aviator (1886–1975)

Infante Alfonso
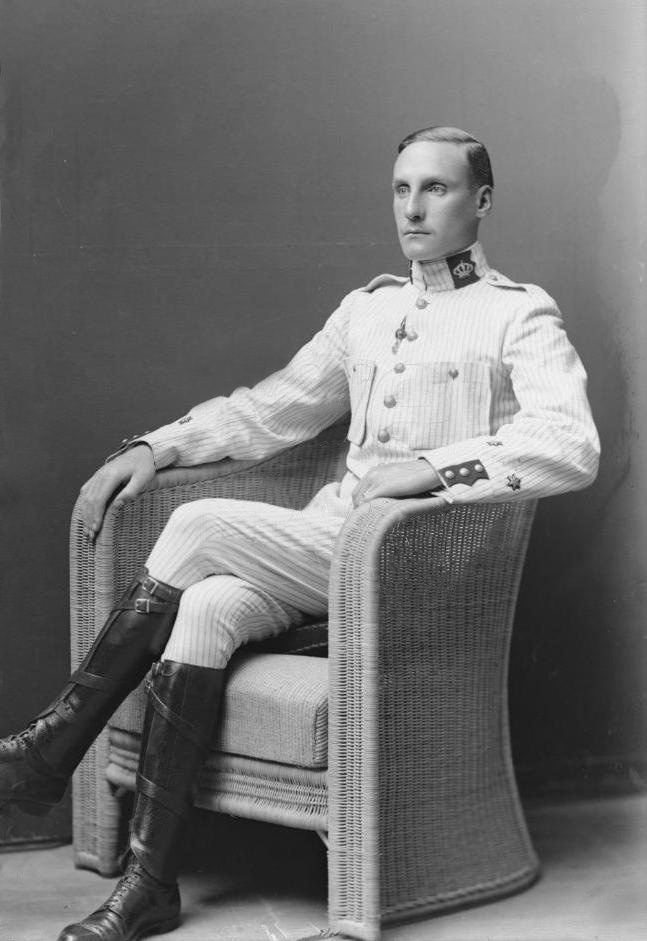
- Photographed by Franzen in rayadillo uniform of the Spanish Army, c. 1910

Duke of Galliera
- Predecessor: Infante Antonio
- Successor: Infante Alvaro
- Born: 12 November 1886; Madrid, Spain
- Died: 6 August 1975 (aged 88); Sanlúcar de Barrameda, Spain
- Burial: Capuchin Monastery of Sanlúcar de Barrameda
- Spouse: Princess Beatrice of Saxe-Coburg and Gotha (m. 1909; died 1966)
- Issue: Infante Álvaro, Duke of Galliera; Infante Alfonso; Prince Ataúlfo of Orléans
Names
- Alfonso María Francisco Antonio Diego
- House: Orléans-Galliera
- Father: Infante Antonio, Duke of Galliera
- Mother: Infanta Eulalia of Spain

Arms of Alfonso of Orléans as Infante of Spain.

Infante Alfonso, Duke of Galliera (12 November 1886 – 6 August 1975) was a Spanish infante and military aviator, and a first cousin of King Alfonso XIII.

== Early life ==
Alfonso was born in Madrid, Spain, the elder son of Infante Antonio, Duke of Galliera and his wife, Infanta Eulalia of Spain. On his paternal side he was a grandson of Antoine, Duke of Montpensier, while on his maternal side he was a grandson of Queen Isabella II of Spain. On 30 November 1886, in the Royal Palace of Madrid, he was baptised with the names Alfonso María Francisco Antonio Diego.

The day before his birth, his maternal aunt Queen Regent Maria Cristina, granted him the title and prerogatives of Infante of Spain.

In 1899, Alfonso and his younger brother Luis Fernando were sent to England to be educated by the Jesuits at Beaumont College. They remained there until 1904.

== Aviation career ==
In 1906, Alfonso graduated from the Academia Militar de Toledo (Military Academy of Toledo). In 1910, he trained as a pilot in France. Upon returning to Spain, he successfully became one of the first and most distinguished aviators in the Spanish military. He served as chief of aerial operations for the 1925 amphibious landings at Al Hoceima in Morocco.

In May 1930, Alfonso was a passenger on the Graf Zeppelin flight from Seville to Brazil. He then continued in the Graf Zeppelin to New York City and visited President Herbert Hoover in Washington, D.C., before returning to Spain.

On 27 February 1931, Alfonso was named Chief of Staff of the Spanish Air Force and Commander of the First Aero District by his cousin King Alfonso XIII.

After the founding of the Second Spanish Republic on 14 April 1931, Alfonso was exiled to London. When he returned to Spain in 1932, he was imprisoned at Villa Cisneros (now Dakhla, Western Sahara). On 1 January 1933, Alfonso and some thirty other monarchist prisoners escaped in a boat, travelling 1800 miles to Lisbon.

In 1937, after the start of the Spanish Civil War Alfonso returned to Spain to head the aerial forces of General Francisco Franco. At the end of the war, he was promoted to general. He was made head of the Second Division Air Force in 1940. Three years later, he was promoted to brigadier general.

For many years, Alfonso was the unofficial representative in Spain of the Count of Barcelona, the son and heir of King Alfonso XIII. In 1941, Alfonso was godfather for the Count of Barcelona's younger son Alfonso. In 1945, Alfonso resigned his position in the Spanish Air Force to show his support for the Lausanne Manifesto, a manifesto of the Count of Barcelona arguing for the restoration of the monarchy. This decision put an end to his military career, although he continued to pilot aircraft as a civilian.

== Marriage and issue ==
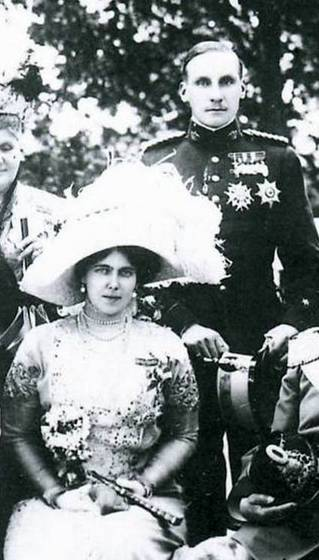
Infante Alfonso de Orleans and his wife Princess Beatrice.

On 15 July 1909, Alfonso married Princess Beatrice of Saxe-Coburg and Gotha "Princess Bee" (1884–1966), daughter of Alfred, Duke of Saxe-Coburg and Gotha (the second son of Queen Victoria of the United Kingdom). There was a civil ceremony in Schloss Rosenau, followed by a Catholic religious ceremony in St. Augustine's Church in Coburg, and finally a Protestant religious ceremony in Schloss Callenberg.

The New York Times reported that Alfonso did not have the permission of his cousin King Alfonso XIII to marry and that he had been "stripped of his Spanish honours and decorations". Indeed, by Royal Decree dated on 16 July 1909 King Alfonso XIII deprived him of all his Spanish titles: "Having been married Don Alfonso de Orleans y Borbón, without complying with the requirements and without the consent that according to his class were necessary... D. Alfonso de Orleans y Borbón is deprived of the prerogatives, honours and distinctions corresponding to the condition of Infante of Spain".

Beatrice had been raised Protestant and chose not to convert to Catholicism. Several days after the marriage, it was revealed that King Alfonso XIII had no personal objection to the marriage: indeed, he encouraged it and used his influence to obtain a dispensation so as to allow a Catholic ceremony. Nevertheless, the Spanish government insisted that the marriage of a Spanish infante to a Protestant could not receive official approval.

Alfonso was removed from his regiment as a consequence of his marriage. The Times reported that he would also be "tried by a disciplinary council for marrying without the permission of the military authorities."

Alfonso and Beatrice had three children:

- Infante Alvaro, Duke of Galliera (20 April 1910 – 22 August 1997)
- Alfonso de Orleans (28 May 1912 – 18 November 1936)
- Prince Ataúlfo of Orléans (20 October 1913 – 8 October 1974)

In 1911, Alfonso was restored to the rank of lieutenant in the army. In 1912, King Alfonso XIII issued a decree restoring his title: I hereby restore the prerogatives, honours and distinctions corresponding to the condition of Infante of Spain, Knight of the Distinguished Order of the Golden Fleece, Knight Grand Cross of the Order of Charles III and many other graces and favors that by Me he has received".

In 1913, Beatrice was received into the Catholic Church.

== Trip to North America ==
In 1928, Alfonso visited North America accompanied by his wife and eldest son. The visit was intended to be a preliminary to a visit by King Alfonso XIII which never occurred. On 13 November they arrived in New York City, where they stayed at the home of General Cornelius Vanderbilt III. They were then the guests of Percy Rivington Pyne, II, at his country home in Roslyn, New York. They proceeded to Philadelphia where they were the guests of Joseph E. Widener. Later they visited Washington, D.C. (where they met Vice President and Mrs. Charles G. Dawes), Boston, Montreal (where they met the Lieutenant Governor of Quebec, Narcisse Pérodeau), Detroit, and Niagara Falls. They left New York City and returned to Spain on 7 December.

== Later life ==
Upon the death of his father in 1930, Infante Alfonso inherited the title of Duke of Galliera in the Italian nobility. In 1937, he renounced the title in favour of his son Álvaro and was therefore styled as Infante Alfonso of Orleans and Bourbon until his death.

In 1975, Alfonso died of a heart attack at his palace in Sanlúcar de Barrameda.

The Fundación Infante de Orleans, a foundation dedicated to the preservation of historical aircraft in Spain, established in 1989, is named in his honour.

== Bibliography ==
- Viaje a los Estados Unidos de S.S.A.A.R.R. los infantes don Alfonso y doña Beatriz de Orleáns y su hijo el príncipe don Álvaro = Trip to the United States of Their R.H. the Infantes Don Alfonso y Doña Beatriz de Orleans and their son the Prince Don Alvaro. Paris, 1929.

Infante Alfonso, Duke of Galliera House of Orléans Cadet branch of the House of Bourbon Born: 12 November 1886 Died: 6 August 1975
Italian nobility
Preceded by Infante Antonio	Duke of Galliera; 24 December 1930 – 14 July 1937	Succeeded by Infante Alvaro
