= Mercedes of Orléans =

Queen of Spain in 1878

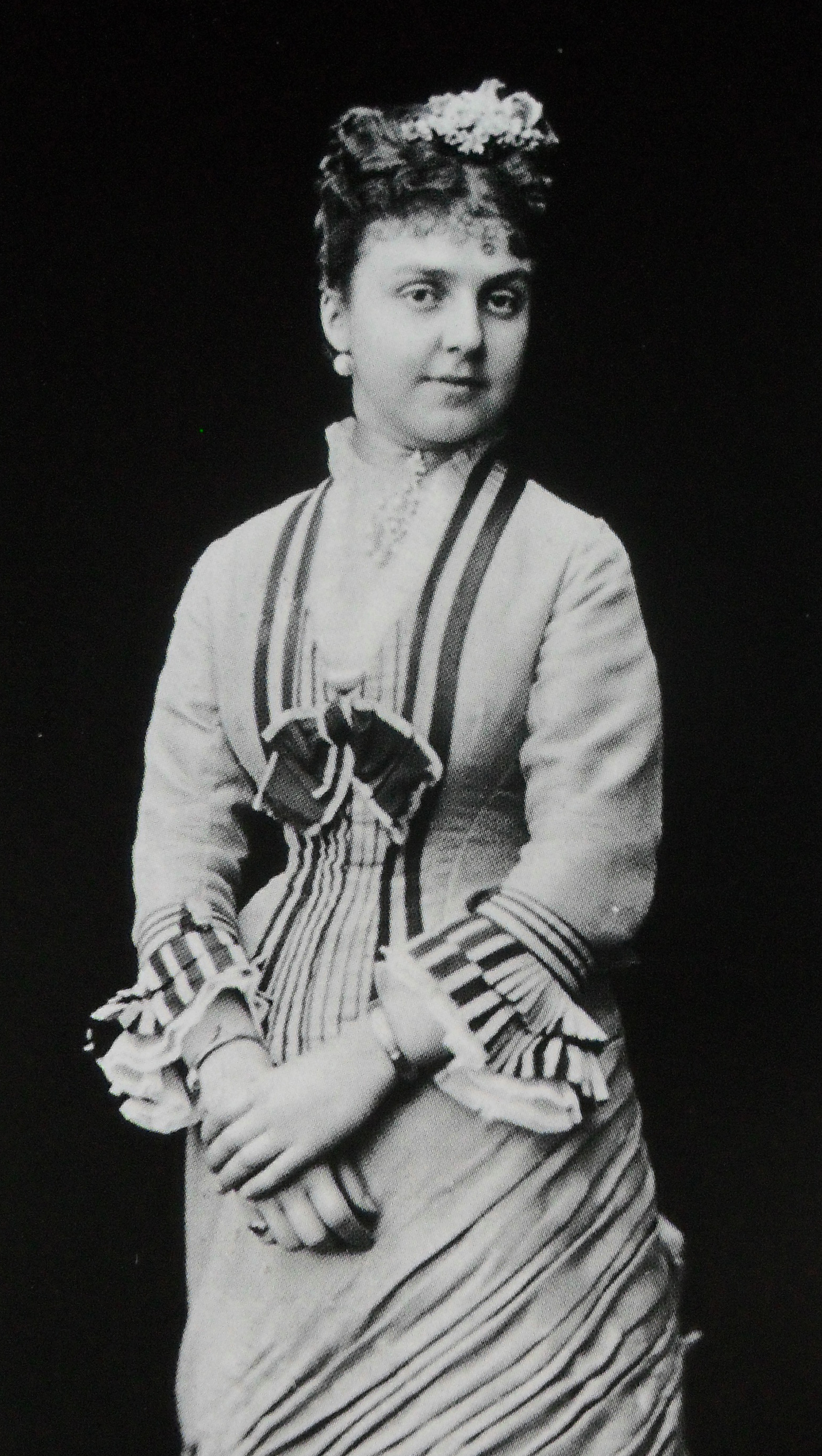

Queen consort of Spain
- Tenure: 23 January 1878 – 26 June 1878
- Born: 24 June 1860; Palacio Real, Madrid, Spain
- Died: 26 June 1878 (aged 18); Palacio Real, Madrid, Spain
- Burial: Cathedral of la Almudena
- Spouse: Alfonso XII (m. 1878)
Names
- Spanish: María de las Mercedes Isabel Francisca de Asís Antonia Luisa Fernanda de Todos los Santos de Orléans y Borbón; French: Marie de La Mercédès Isabelle Françoise d'Asis Antoinette Louise Ferdinande d'Orléans
- House: Orléans
- Father: Prince Antoine, Duke of Montpensier
- Mother: Infanta Luisa Fernanda of Spain

María de las Mercedes of Orléans (24 June 1860 – 26 June 1878) was Queen of Spain as the first wife of King Alfonso XII. She was born in Madrid, the daughter of Prince Antoine, Duke of Montpensier, and Infanta Luisa Fernanda of Spain.

== Biography ==
=== Birth and early life ===
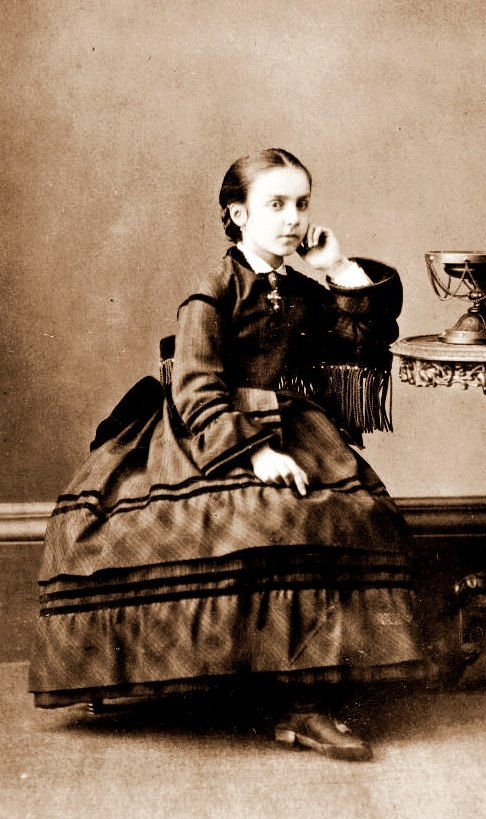
María de las Mercedes during her childhood

In 1859, Antoine, Duke of Montpensier, son of King Louis Philippe I of France, and his wife, Infanta Luisa Fernanda—sister of Queen Isabella II of Spain—traveled to Madrid. The Duke intended to offer his services in the War of Africa. However, his offer was ignored by both Prime Minister Leopoldo O'Donnell and Queen Isabella II, who wished to prevent him from gaining further political notoriety. Resentful, the Duke departed for Claremont House near London to visit his mother, leaving his pregnant wife in Madrid. In May 1860, the Duke returned to Madrid, where the Queen invited the couple to remain at Court for the birth of their child.

Maria de las Mercedes was born in Madrid on June 24, 1860. She was baptized that same evening in the chapel of the Royal Palace of Madrid. Her godparents were her aunt and uncle, Queen Isabella II and her consort, Francis, Duke of Cádiz.

From 1849, the family’s primary residence was the Palace of San Telmo in Seville. In the autumn of 1867, several high-ranking generals and officials conspired to offer the Spanish crown to the Duke of Montpensier should it become vacant. Although the Duke was informed of this agreement in early 1868, he reportedly gave no official response. Later that year, the Duke financed plans to overthrow Isabella II. Consequently, the government forced the family into exile in Lisbon in July 1868. Following the success of the Glorious Revolution in September, which sent Isabella II into exile, the family returned to Seville in 1869.

=== Engagement and marriage ===
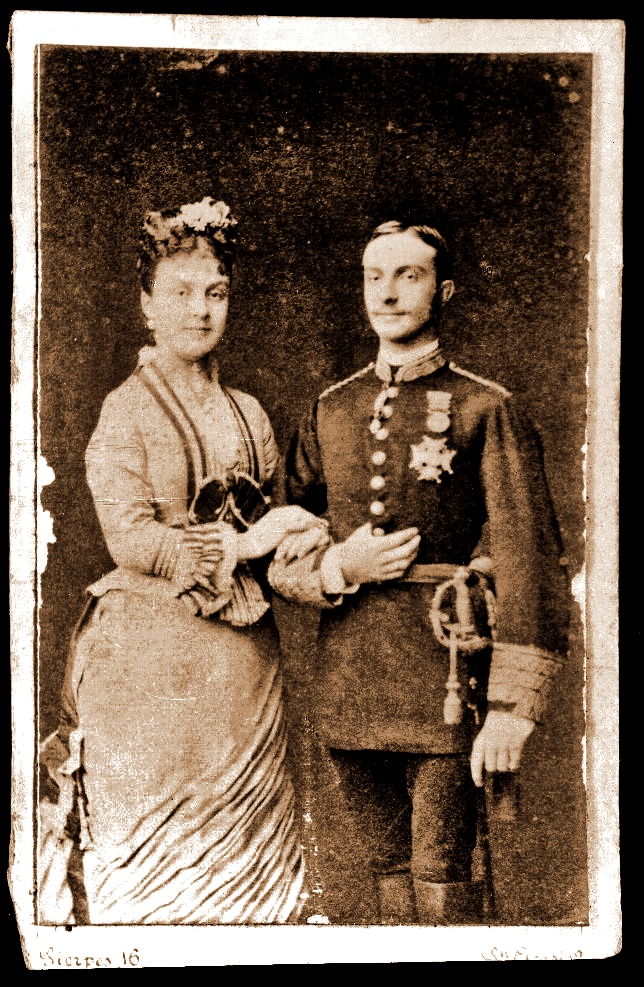
Mercedes and Alfonso XII

Isabella II abdicated her rights to the throne in favor of her son, Alfonso, on June 25, 1870. In 1871, Isabella sent an envoy to Seville to negotiate an agreement with the Duke of Montpensier. Under the terms, the Duke recognized Alfonso’s rights, a potential regency was outlined, and a marriage between Alfonso and Maria de las Mercedes was proposed, provided the parties agreed.

In 1872, the Duke of Montpensier, then under investigation for the assassination of General Juan Prim, moved to France. In January of that year, the Duke and his family met with Isabella II in Paris to reconcile and show support for the Bourbon restoration. This resulted in the **Cannes Agreement**, where the Duke formally supported Alfonso's candidacy for the throne.

During Christmas 1872, Isabella II and Alfonso were invited by the Montpensiers to the Chateau de Randan. It was there that Alfonso fell in love with Maria de las Mercedes, and the two became engaged. Following the Restoration in December 1874, Alfonso was proclaimed King as Alfonso XII.

The Royal Family returned to Spain definitively in October 1876. Alfonso XII met them in Madrid, where he renewed his vow of love to Mercedes. On December 7, 1877, the King formally requested her hand in marriage via the Duke of Sesto. The proposal was formally accepted at the Palace of San Telmo, where Mercedes received a gold, ruby, and diamond bracelet as a gift from the King.

The royal wedding took place on 23 January 1878, at the Basilica of Nuestra Señora de Atocha in Madrid. Isabella II, who had reluctantly accepted the match, did not attend the ceremony.

=== Illness and death ===
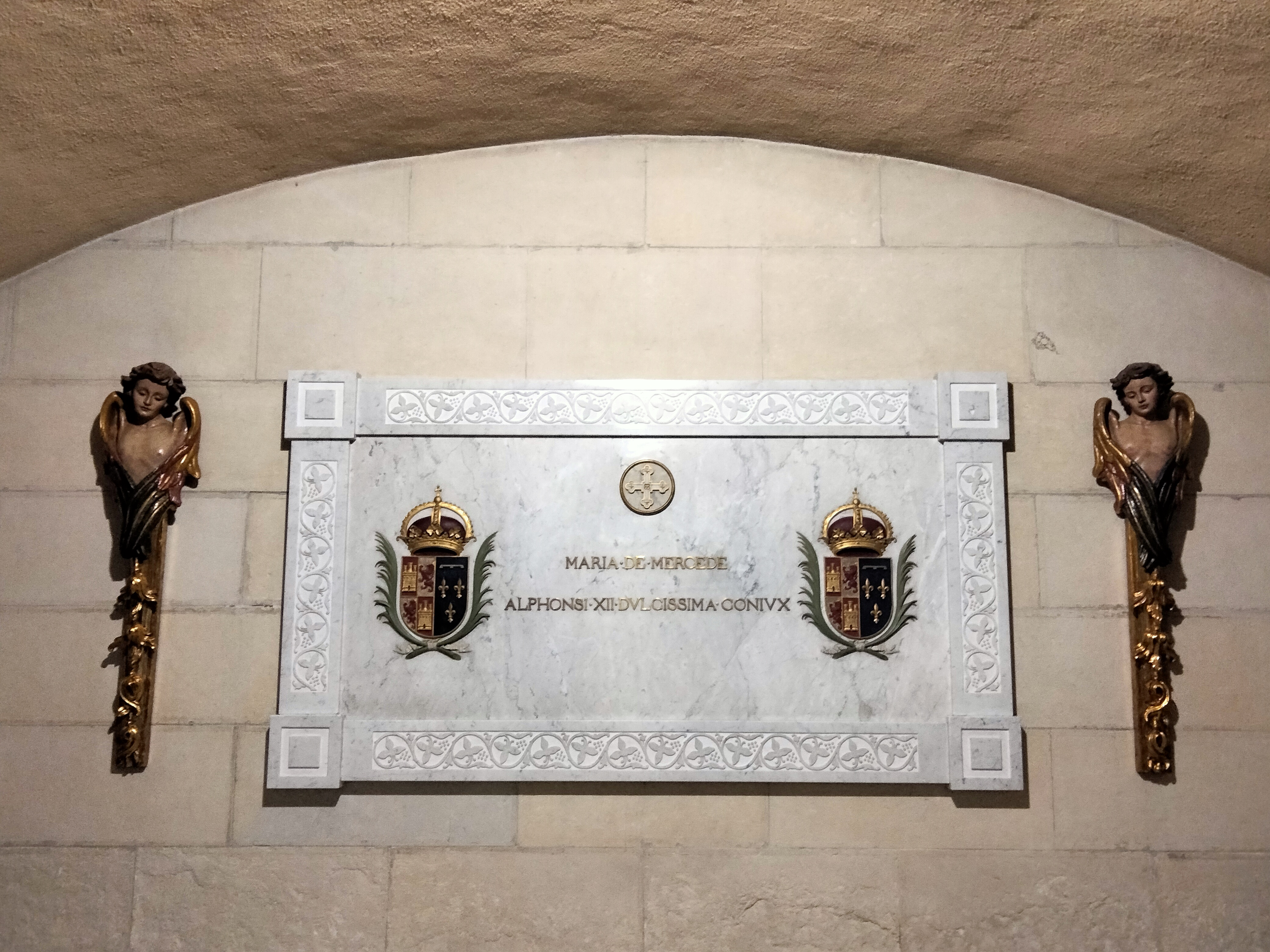
The tomb of Queen Maria de las Mercedes in Almudena Cathedral.

In March 1878, shortly after the royal honeymoon, it became evident that the Queen was unwell. She suffered a miscarriage following a long horse ride and subsequently fell ill. While she appeared to recover briefly, her health began to decline steadily in late May. On June 22, she began suffering from hemorrhages.

Maria de las Mercedes died on June 26, 1878, at the age of 18; her marriage had lasted only five months and three days. The official medical report cited "nervous gastric fever," though modern historians and contemporary reports believe she died of typhoid fever or typhus.

She was initially buried at El Escorial, as she was not the mother of a King. However, in accordance with the wish of Alfonso XII, her remains were transferred to Almudena Cathedral in Madrid on November 8, 2000. Her white marble tomb bears the Latin inscription:

«MARIA·DE·MERCEDE ALPHONSI·XII·DVLCISSIMA·CONIVX».

(translated as "Maria de las Mercedes, sweetest wife of Alfonso XII").

== Legacy ==
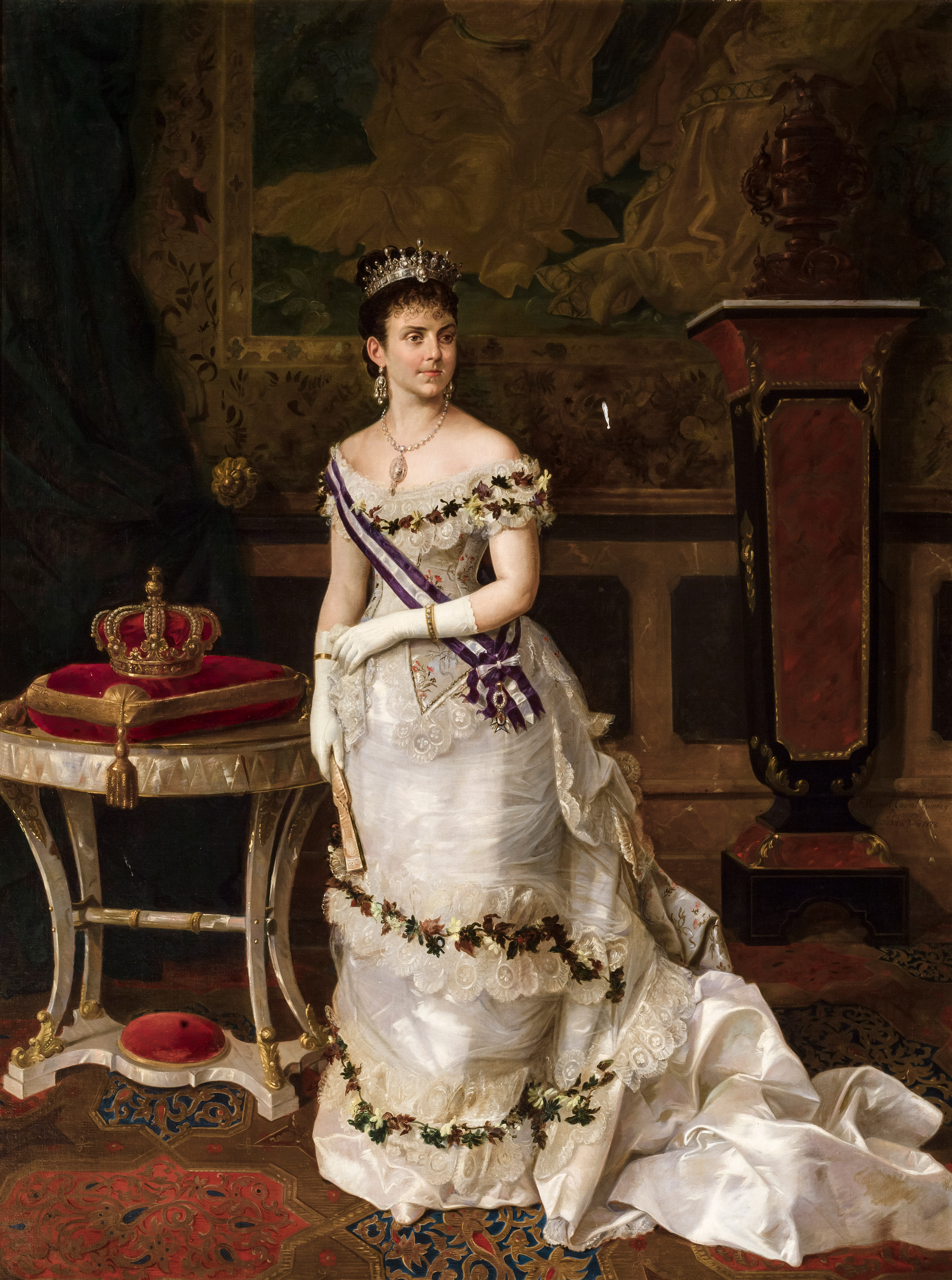
Portrait of Mercedes in 1878, the year of her death (portrait by Manuel Cabral Aguado-Bejarano)

The news of her demise spawned many folk songs accounting for it, most notably the famous copla, with many variations in Spain and America, particularly popular among children delivered as a song accompanying a skipping rope game. According to Benito Pérez Galdós, he had already heard about it a few days after the incident: “¿Dónde vas Alfonso XII? ¿Dónde vas triste de ti? Voy en busca de Mercedes que ayer tarde no la vi…” ("Where are you going, Alfonso XII? Where are you going, sad man?—I'm going in search of Mercedes whom I did not see yesterday afternoon..."). A film about the romance between María de las Mercedes and Alfonso XII, Where Are You Going, Alfonso XII?, was released in 1958.

Queen Mercedes co-initiated the building of the Cathedral of la Almudena in Madrid, opposite of the royal palace —the construction beginning in 1883. In May 2004 Felipe, Prince of Asturias, was wed there to Letizia Ortiz. Queen Mercedes' remains were re-interred there on 8 November 2000, in accordance with her widower's wishes.

A town in the northern Philippine province of Isabela was named Reina Mercedes in her honor in 1886 when the Spanish colonial government formally separated it from Cauayan.

When the King's minister Cánovas del Castillo suggested that he take a new wife, Alfonso acquiesced, choosing Mercedes' sister María Cristina. She also contracted tuberculosis, and died during the engagement period. In late 1879, he married Archduchess Maria Christina of Austria-Teschen; the eldest of their children, the Princess of Asturias, was named in honour of Queen Mercedes.

== Arms ==
Coat of arms of Queen María de las Mercedes
Escutcheon Per pale: I, quarterly, 1 and 4 gules a castle or, open and ajouré azure (Castile), and 2 and 3 argent a lion gules, armed, langued, and crowned or (León), with a base argent a pomegranate gules, slipped and leaved vert (Granada) and overall an escutcheon azure three fleurs-de-lis or within a bordure gules (Bourbon-Anjou); II, azure three fleurs-de-lis or a label argent (Orléans). Orders Order of Queen Maria Luisa

== Ancestry ==
Ancestors of Mercedes of Orléans

8. Louis Philippe II, Duke of Orléans
4. Louis Philippe I of France
9. Louise Marie Adélaïde de Bourbon
2. Prince Antoine, Duke of Montpensier
10. Ferdinand I of the Two Sicilies
5. Maria Amalia of Naples and Sicily
11. Maria Carolina of Austria
1. María de las Mercedes of Spain
12. Charles IV of Spain
6. Ferdinand VII of Spain
13. Maria Luisa of Parma
3. Infanta Luisa Fernanda of Spain
14. Francis I of the Two Sicilies
7. Maria Christina of the Two Sicilies
15. María Isabel of Spain

== See also ==
- Reign of Alfonso XII
