= Prince Antoine, Duke of Montpensier =

French royal; youngest son of Louis Philippe I (1824-1890)

Prince Antoine
- Duke of Montpensier
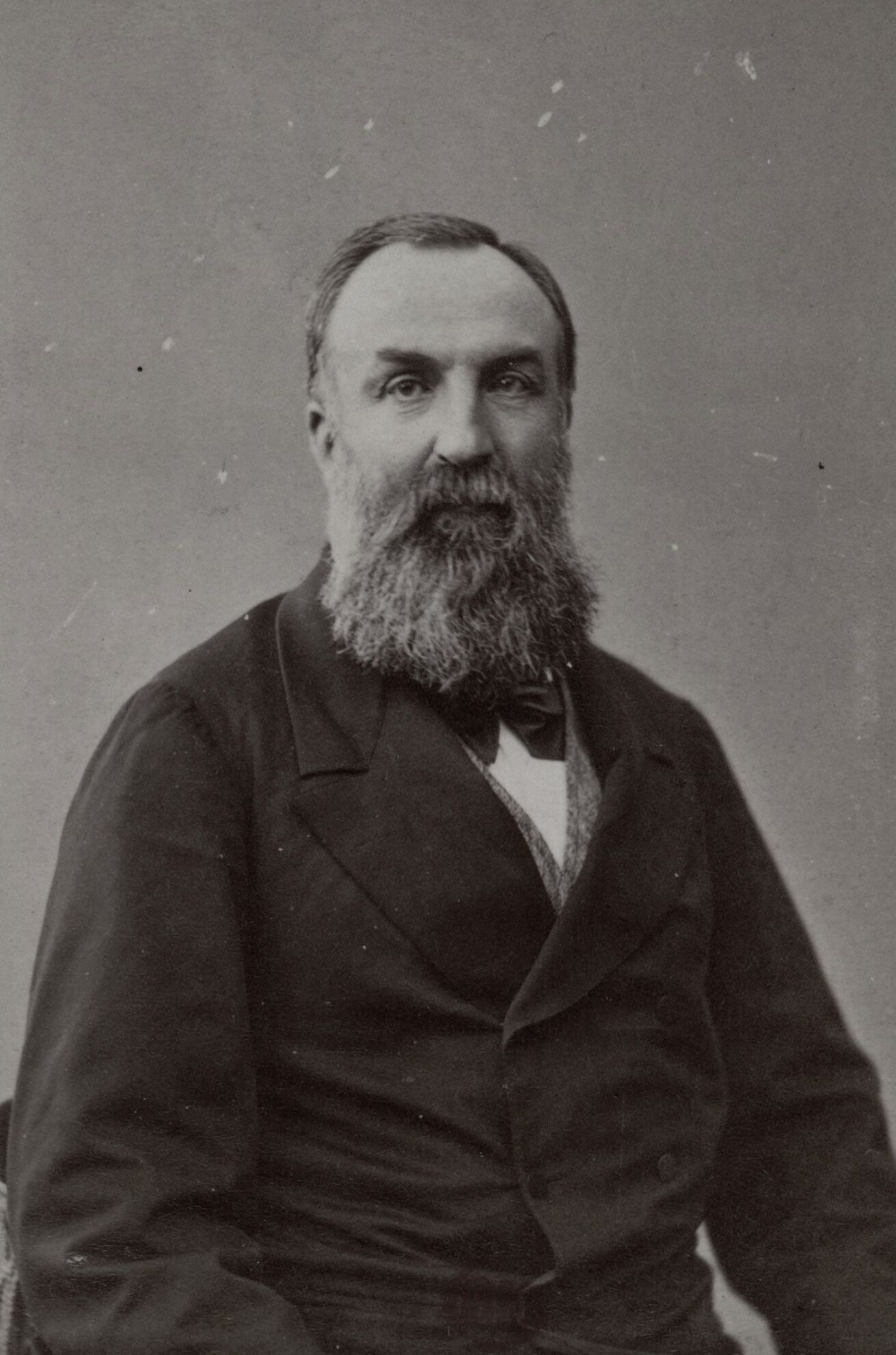
- Studio portrait by Nadar
- Born: 31 July 1824; Château de Neuilly, Neuilly-sur-Seine, Kingdom of France
- Died: 4 February 1890 (aged 65); Palacio de Orléans-Borbón, Sanlúcar de Barrameda, Kingdom of Spain
- Burial: 8 February 1890; Infantes Pantheon, Royal Monastery of San Lorenzo de El Escorial, Spain
- Spouse: Infanta Luisa Fernanda of Spain (m. 1846)
- Issue among others...: Princess Marie Isabelle of Orléans, Countess of Paris; Princess Maria Amelia; Princess Marie Christine; Mercedes, Queen of Spain; Infante Antonio, Duke of Galliera
Names
- French: Antoine Marie Philippe Louis d'Orléans; Spanish: Antonio María Felipe Luis de Orleans
- House: Orléans
- Father: Louis Philippe I of France
- Mother: Maria Amalia of Naples and Sicily

Prince Antoine, Duke of Montpensier (Antoine Marie Philippe Louis d'Orléans; 31 July 1824 – 4 February 1890), was a member of the House of Orléans. He was the youngest son of King Louis Philippe I and his wife Maria Amalia of the Two Sicilies. He was styled as the Duke of Montpensier.

== Marriage and issue ==
On 10 October 1846 at Madrid, Spain, he married Infanta Luisa Fernanda of Spain, the daughter of King Ferdinand VII of Spain and Maria Christina of the Two Sicilies.

They had ten children:

1. Marie Isabelle (21 September 1848 – 23 April 1919), later known as Countess of Paris. Married her first cousin Prince Philippe, Count of Paris (1838–1894), pretender to the French throne, and had issue.
2. Maria Amelia (28 August 1851 – 9 November 1870)
3. Maria Cristina (29 October 1852 – 28 April 1879)
4. Maria de la Regla (9 October 1856 – 25 July 1861)
5. Stillborn child (31 March 1857 – 31 March 1857)
6. Fernando (29 May 1859 – 3 December 1873)
7. Mercedes (24 June 1860 – 26 June 1878), married her first cousin King Alfonso XII and became Queen of Spain, had no issue.
8. Felipe Raimundo Maria (12 May 1862 – 13 February 1864)
9. Antonio (23 February 1866 – 24 December 1930), became Duke of Galliera in Italy. He married his first cousin Infanta Eulalia of Spain (1864–1958), daughter of Isabella II, and had two sons.
10. Luis Maria Felipe Antonio (30 April 1867 – 21 May 1874)

== Candidate for the Spanish throne ==
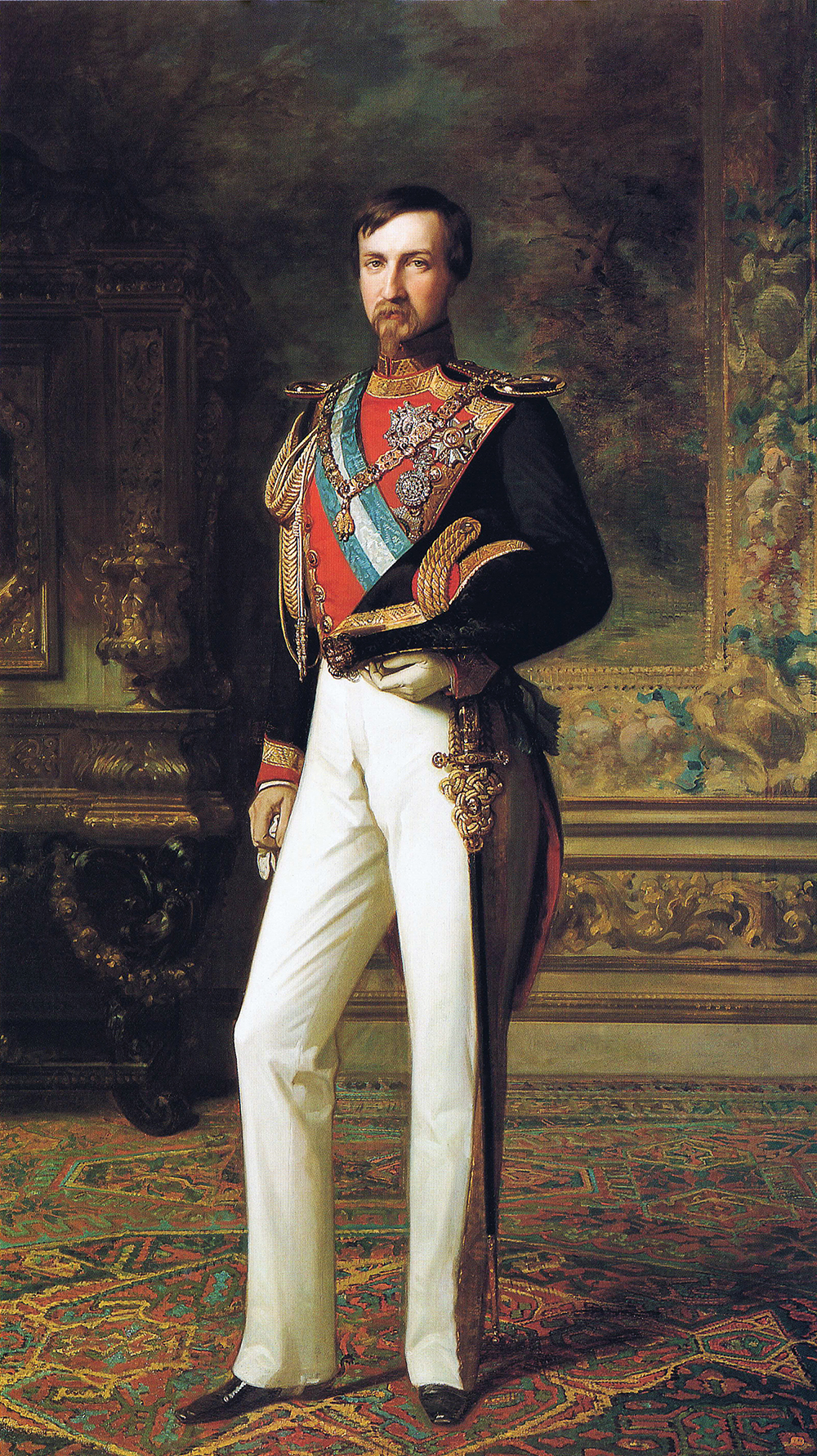
Portrait by Federico de Madrazo y Kuntz, 1851

Antoine de Montpensier lived in Spain from 1848 when he and his family had to leave France after the Revolution of 1848. During the Spanish revolution of 1868, he supported the insurgents under Juan Prim against Queen Isabella II, his own sister-in-law.

In 1870 he fought a duel against Infante Enrique, Duke of Seville, the brother of King Francisco, and killed him. Antoine was convicted and sentenced to one month in prison.

On 16 November 1870 the Cortes voted for the next king and chose Amadeo of Savoy with 191 votes. Antoine only received 27 votes, and left Spain, only to return in 1874. His ambitions were fulfilled by his daughter Mercedes, who became Queen of Spain after her marriage to Alfonso XII, son of Isabella II. However, she died at the age of 18 without issue.

Despite never reaching the throne, however, through cognates, he is an ancestor of all Spanish monarchs since Juan Carlos I. His great granddaughter Mercedes, Countess of Barcelona, was the mother of Juan Carlos, who assumed the throne in 1975 and later abdicated in favor of his son, Felipe VI in 2014.

== Early collector of photography ==
The Duke of Montpensier was an early collector of photography. His collection consisted of dozens of albums and hundreds of early photographs, mainly of Spanish, French and British photographers. The collection was dispersed after his death.

== Honours and arms ==
=== Honours ===
- Kingdom of France: Grand Cross of the Legion of Honour, 9 November 1845
- Spain:
  - Knight of the Golden Fleece, 10 October 1846
  - Grand Cross of the Order of Charles III, with Collar
  - Grand Cross of the Military Order of St. Hermenegild
  - Grand Cross of Military Merit, with Red Decoration
- Baden:
  - Knight of the House Order of Fidelity, 1846
  - Grand Cross of the Zähringer Lion, 1846
- Belgium: Grand Cordon of the Order of Leopold, 11 December 1844
- Kingdom of Portugal: Grand Cross of the Tower and Sword
- Beylik of Tunis: Husainid Family Order
- Two Sicilies: Grand Cross of St. Ferdinand and Merit

=== Arms ===
Prince Antoine did not have a personal coat of arms. He used the traditional arms of the House of Orléans, consisting of:

Azure, three fleur-de-lis Or and a label Argent

[In heraldic blazon, Azure is blue, Or is gold, and Argent is silver]

This coat of arms was first used by Philippe d'Orléans, nephew and son in law of King Louis XIV. As cadets of the French royal family, they bore the arms of France differenced by a label argent.

Heraldry of Antoine, Duke of Montpensier

Coat of arms of Prince Antoine in Spain

Arms of alliance of Prince Antoine and his wife

Prince Antoine, Duke of Montpensier House of Orléans Cadet branch of the House of Bourbon Born: 31 July 1824 Died: 4 February 1890
French nobility
Vacant Title last held by Prince Antoine Philippe d'Orléans	Duke of Montpensier; 16 August 1830 – 4 February 1890	Vacant Title next held by Prince Ferdinand d'Orléans
Italian nobility
Vacant Title last held by Maria Brignole-Sale	Duke of Galliera; 9 December 1888 – 4 February 1890	Succeeded by Infante Antonio
