= Infanta María Teresa of Spain =

Princess Ferdinand of Bavaria

Infanta María Teresa
- Princess Ferdinand of Bavaria
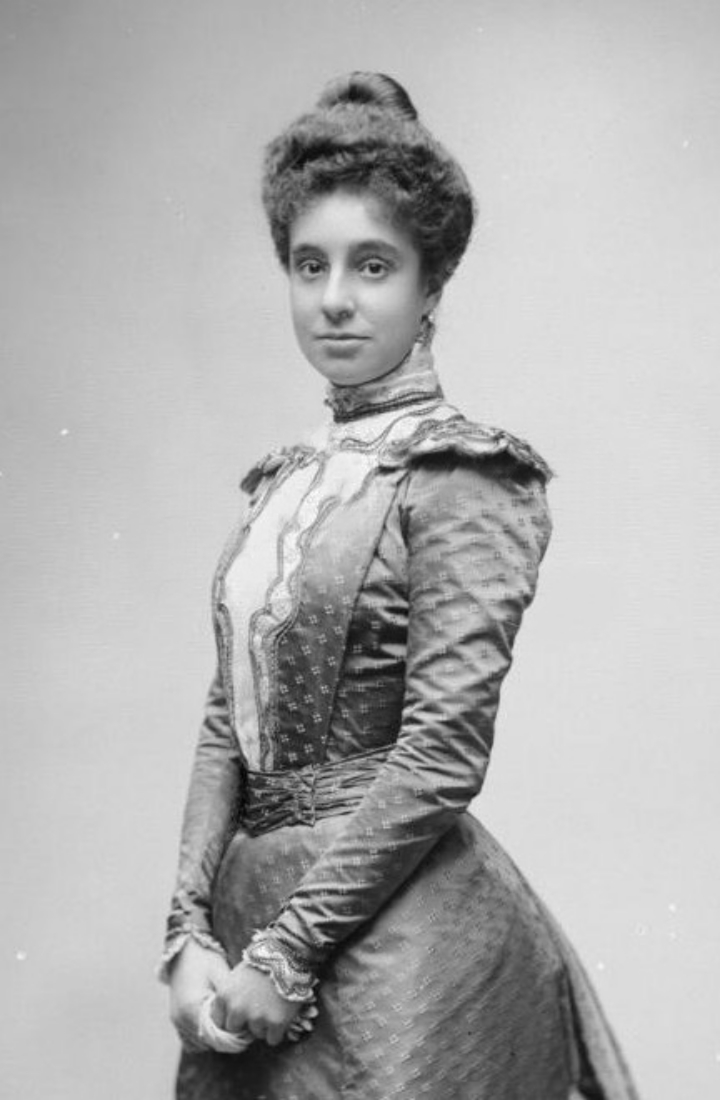
- María Teresa in 1903
- Born: 12 November 1882; Madrid, Kingdom of Spain
- Died: 23 September 1912 (aged 29); Madrid, Kingdom of Spain
- Burial: El Escorial
- Spouse: Prince Ferdinand of Bavaria (m. 1906)
- Issue: Infante Luis Alfonso; Infante José Eugenio; Infanta María de las Mercedes; Infanta María del Pilar
Names
- Spanish: María Teresa Isabel Eugenia del Patrocinio Diega
- House: Bourbon
- Father: Alfonso XII of Spain
- Mother: Maria Christina of Austria

Infanta María Teresa of Spain (Spanish: María Teresa Isabel Eugenia del Patrocinio Diega de Borbón y Habsburgo, Infanta de España; 12 November 1882 – 23 September 1912) was the second eldest child and daughter of Alfonso XII of Spain and his second wife Maria Christina of Austria. Maria Teresa was an Infanta of Spain and a member of the House of Bourbon by birth.

== Marriage and issue ==
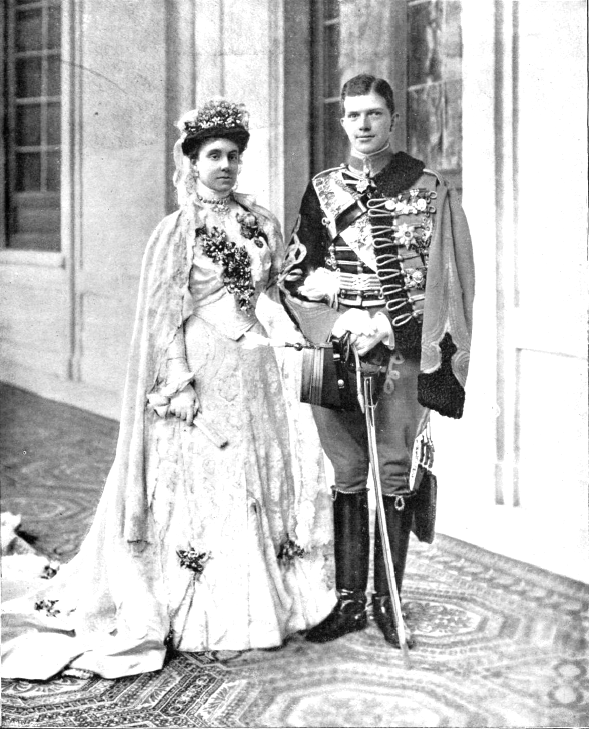
Infanta Maria Teresa with her husband on their wedding day

Maria Teresa married her first cousin, Prince Ferdinand of Bavaria, Infante of Spain, eldest son and child of Prince Ludwig Ferdinand of Bavaria and his wife Infanta María de la Paz of Spain, on 12 January 1906 in Madrid. Maria Teresa and Ferdinand had four children:

- Infante Luis Alfonso of Spain (6 December 1906 – 14 May 1983)
- Infante José Eugenio of Spain (26 March 1909 – 16 August 1966)
- Infanta Maria de las Mercedes of Spain (3 October 1911 – 11 September 1953)
- Infanta Maria del Pilar of Spain (15 September 1912 – 9 May 1918)

She died of complications of childbirth.

== Arms ==
Heraldry of Infanta Maria Teresa of Spain

Coat of Arms of Infanta Maria Teresa of Spain

== Ancestry ==
Ancestors of Infanta María Teresa of Spain

8. Infante Francisco de Paula of Spain
4. Infante Francisco de Asís of Spain
9. Princess Luisa Carlotta of the Two Sicilies
2. Alfonso XII of Spain
10. Ferdinand VII of Spain
5. Isabella II of Spain
11. Princess Maria Cristina of the Two Sicilies
1. Infanta María Teresa of Spain
12. Archduke Charles, Duke of Teschen
6. Archduke Karl Ferdinand of Austria
13. Princess Henrietta of Nassau-Weilburg
3. Archduchess Maria Christina of Austria
14. Archduke Joseph, Palatine of Hungary
7. Archduchess Elisabeth Franziska of Austria
15. Duchess Maria Dorothea of Württemberg
