= Desmond Chapman-Huston =

Irish actor and historian (1884–1952)

Wellesley William Desmond Mountjoy Chapman-Huston aka Desmond Mountjoy (8 August 1884 – 15 September 1952) was an Irish author and publisher.

== Life ==
Chapman-Huston was born into the family of Richard Huston and Katherine Mountjoy Chapman. Through his mother, he was related to a family of the Irish high nobility, who could trace their roots back to Sir Walter Raleigh. Chapman-Huston first wanted to study theology, but then joined the acting troupe around Francis Robert Benson in 1902. First he worked as his secretary, later as an actor. During this time he also began his first publications. In 1903, The Ashes of the Past, a tragedy in one act, appeared, a year later a first volume of poems followed by Driftwood. The early publications were still made under his pseudonym.

After the First World War, he volunteered as a secretary for the Country Host Institution, which set itself the goal of organizing recreational stays for soldiers in the countryside. In 1924, he became a writer again with a biography of Sir John Cowans (1862–1921), the quartermaster general of the British Army in the World War I.

At the beginning of the 1930s, he moved to Bavaria, where he first lived in Munich and later in Herrsching am Ammersee. One of his first works from the new homeland was the book Bavaria the Incomparable, published in 1934, on which he worked together with Princess Pilar of Bavaria (1891–1987), the daughter of Prince Ludwig Ferdinand of Bavaria and Infanta María de la Paz of Spain. The book is largely a travel guide dedicated to the tourist attractions of Bavaria, but thanks to the cooperation from House of Wittelsbach, it was also able to describe non-publicly accessible sights. Characteristic of the work, according to one of the reviewers, is the image of Bavaria, which is supported by noticeable enthusiasm.

Some historical biographies followed. His book about Ludwig II of Bavaria Ludwig II of Bavaria (Bavarian Fantasy. The Story of Ludwig II. John Murray, London 1955) gained particular importance in Germany, was translated into several languages and is still published today.

Chapman was the editor of some memoirs of the high nobility such as the diaries of Princess Louise Sophie of Schleswig-Holstein-Sonderburg-Augustenburg, Daisy, Princess of Pless, Gebhard Prince of Blücher, Infanta María de la Paz of Spain and her daughter, Pilar.

According to W. John Koch, Chapman-Huston, courted controversy for publishing Princess Pilar's diaries.
