= Infanta María del Pilar of Spain =

Spanish infanta (1861–1879)

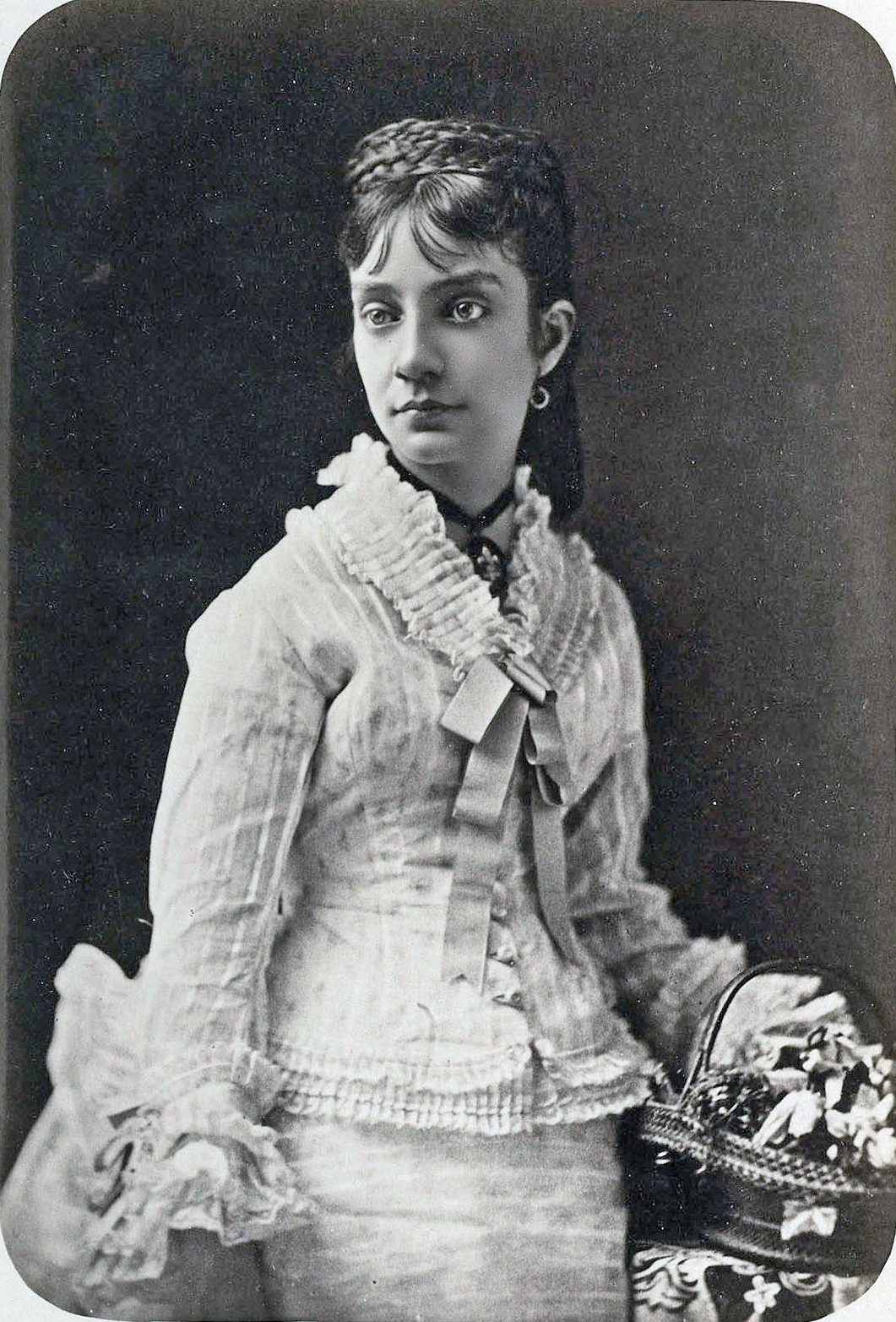
- Pilar in the 1870s
- Born: 4 June 1861; Madrid, Spain
- Died: 5 August 1879 (aged 18); Eskoriatza, Spain
- Burial: El Escorial
Names
- María del Pilar Berenguela Isabel Francisca de Asís Cristina Sebastiana Gabriela Francisca Caracciolo Saturnina de Borbón y Borbón
- House: Bourbon
- Father: Francisco de Asís, Duke of Cádiz
- Mother: Isabella II

Infanta María del Pilar of Spain (Spanish: María del Pilar Berenguela Isabel Francisca de Asís Cristina Sebastiana Gabriela Francisca Caracciolo Saturnina de Borbón y Borbón; 4 June 1861 – 5 August 1879) was the third surviving child and second surviving daughter of Queen Isabella II and her king consort, Francisco de Asís, Duke of Cádiz. She was one of the three younger sisters of King Alfonso XII and one of his four sisters overall.

At the age of seven, Pilar accompanied her mother into exile in Paris, where she was educated at the College of the Sacred Heart. After the fall of Napoleon III, the royal family settled in Geneva. In 1875, with the restoration of the monarchy to her brother Alfonso XII, she returned to Spain. Upon her mother's return to France, Pilar moved with her younger sisters Paz and Eulalia to the Royal Palace of Madrid. She completed her education under the supervision of her eldest sister, Isabella, Princess of Asturias.

There was a project to marry Pilar to Napoleon, Prince Imperial, son and heir of the French emperor Napoleon III. Prince Napoleon's mother, Empress Eugenie, and Queen Isabella II were in favor of this union, but the young prince was killed in the Anglo-Zulu War. Two months later, Pilar died suddenly in Eskoriatza at the age of 18. Empress Eugenie took a wreath from her son's grave and sent it to Pilar's gravesite in El Escorial.

== Early life ==
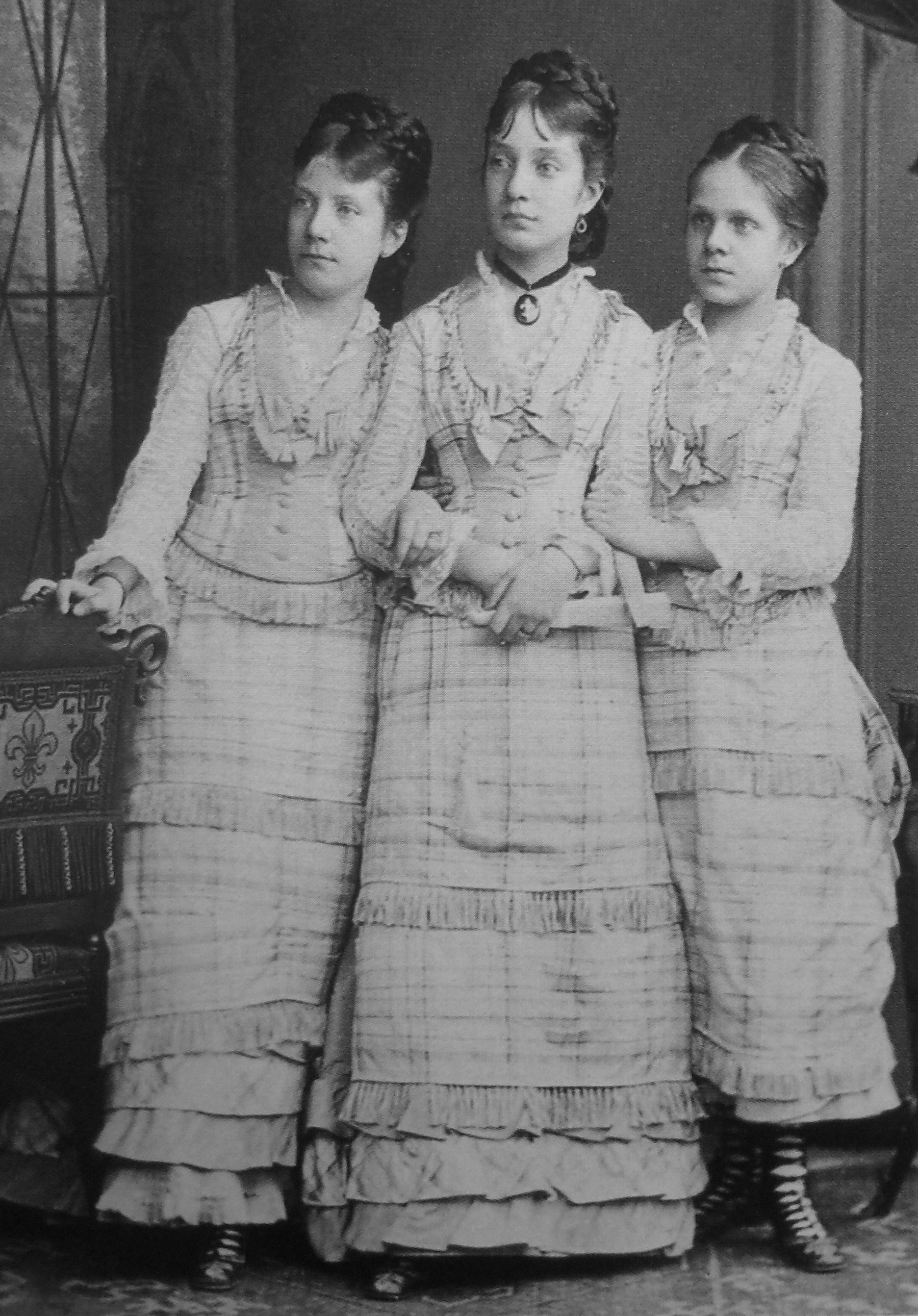
From left to right : Infantas Paz, Pilar and Eulalia of Spain.

Born on 4 June 1861 at the Royal Palace of Madrid, Infanta Pilar was the third surviving child of Queen Isabella II and King Francisco de Asís. She was christened the day following her birth as María del Pilar Berenguela Isabel Francisca de Asís Cristina Sebastiana Gabriela Francisca Caracciolo Saturnina. Her godparents were her paternal aunt and uncle, Infanta Maria Cristina of Spain and Infante Sebastian of Portugal and Spain, a couple who had married the previous year.

The Queen paid little attention to the King, who was considered effeminate and whom she had been forced to marry at age sixteen. However, during their dysfunctional marriage, Queen Isabella was pregnant twelve times. Historians and biographers have come to believe that King Francisco was the biological father of few if any of the Queen's children. Their paternity has been attributed to Isabella's various lovers. Between 1859 and 1865, Isabella's romantic attentions centered in the diplomat and politician Miguel Tenorio de Castilla (1818-1912). Twelve years older than Isabella, Tenorio arrived at the court of Madrid in April 1859 as secretary to the Queen. He was a widower with a son and with an extensive political career. His relationship with Isabella was placid and he served her with loyalty and efficiency. In August 1865, he was dismissed from his post as both Leopoldo O'Donnell, president of the government, and his successor, Ramón María Narváez, were weary of the influence Tenorio had over the Queen. Tenorio is frequently assigned the paternity of three of the Queen's daughters, Infantas Pilar, Paz and Eulalia. However, King Francisco recognized as his all of the children born during his troubled marriage. Four daughters and one son survived infancy. Infanta Pilar was his favorite and the one to whom he felt closest.

Infanta Pilar spent her early year in the formal atmosphere of the Spanish court. Until age four, she was raised by a wet nurse who had been carefully chosen. At the age of seven, her education was placed under the supervision of the Duchess of Berwick and Alba. By that time, the stability of Isabella II's reign was shaky. Isabella lost, in quick succession, the two most prominent politicians of her government. Leopold O'Donell died in November 1867 and Narvaez in April 1868, while still presiding over the government. In summer 1868, after spending some days in the Palace of la Granja, the Spanish royal family moved to the Cantabrian Coast. They went to Lekeitio to spend time sea bathing, which had been prescribed to the Queen as she suffered from a skin condition. Pilar was then seven years old. Her constant companions were her sisters Paz, age six, and Eulalia age four. Their brother Alfonso, age ten, was educated separately as he was the heir to the throne. Pilar's eldest sister, Infanta Isabella, had been married off to her cousin Prince Gaetan, Count of Girgenti, in May and she was abroad on her wedding trip. While the royal family was in Lekeitio, a military upsiring broke out. On 28 September, the defeat of the royalist troops headed by General Novaliches in the battle of Alcolea sealed the end of Isabella II's reign. Two days later, the royal family crossed the border by train to Biarritz.

== Exile ==
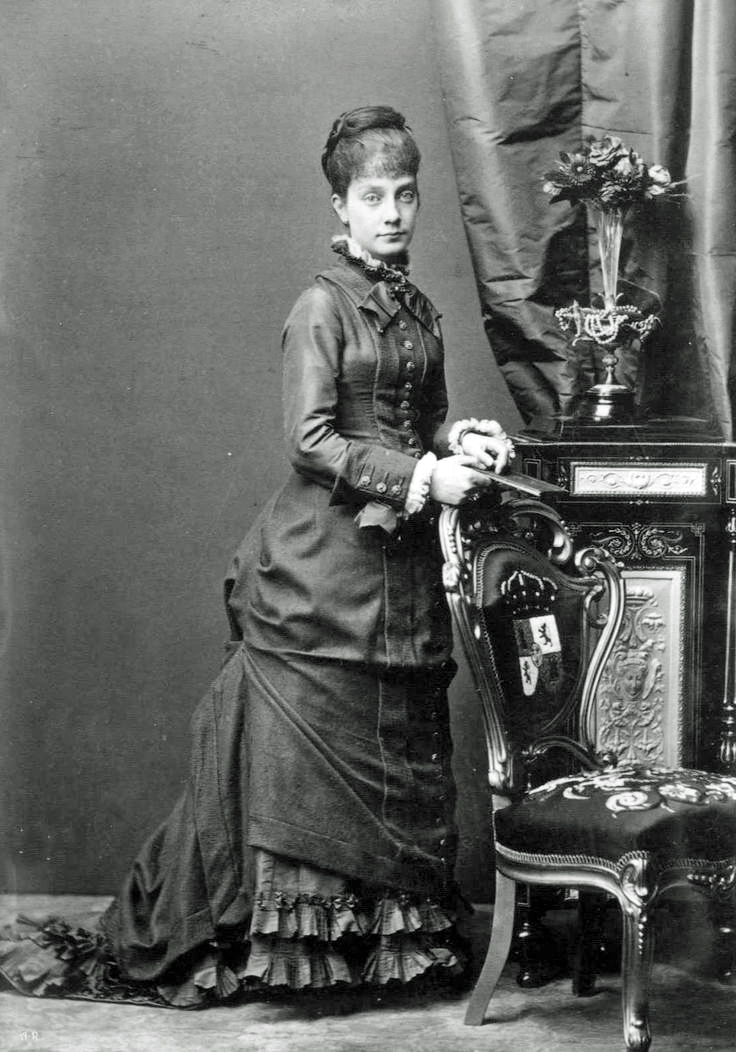
Infanta Pilar of Spain.

The first home of the Spanish royal family in exile was the Château de Pau, a renaissance castle that had been the birthplace of Pilar's ancestor Henry IV of France. The Château de Pau was conveniently located close to the Spanish border and it was given to them as temporary residence by Napoleon III. As the castle was very uncomfortable, the deposed Spanish royals lived there no more than a month. Isabella II decided to settle in Paris where she bought the Palace Basilweski in the avenue du Roi-de-Rome. Located near the Arc de Triomphe, the Palace Basilweski was renamed the Palace of Castille and became the home in exile for Infanta Pilar and her family.

Away from the formality of the Spanish court, life in exile allowed more freedom to Infanta Pilar and her sisters. They became the first Spanish princesses not to be educated under the confines of a palace. Infantas Pilar, Paz and Eulalia were enrolled at the Sacré-Coeur, a Catholic school run by nuns in la rue de Varnnes. Although the Sacré-Coeur was a boarding school, the three infantas went to class there daily while remaining living at the Palace of Castile. French soon became their first language. Isabella II, who resented that her own mother had neglected her, was devoted to her children. The reduced household and the proximity brought by the exile made the relationship between the Queen and her three younger daughters closer. Pilar's brother was sent to study in Vienna while their eldest sister lived in Switzerland with her husband.

On the second anniversary of their arrival in France, the fall of the monarchy of Napoleon III and the disturbances in Paris forced Queen Isabella and her children to leave the city on 29 September 1871. They spent the next year living at the Hotel de la paix in Geneva, Switzerland. On 26 November 1871, Pilar's brother-in-law, the Count of Girgenti, committed suicide. In August 1872, a month after the commune was dissolved, the Queen decided to return to Paris. Their residence, the Palace of Castille, had survived the disturbances. However, used as a hospital, its interiors and decorations had been destroyed requiring extensive renovations. Back in Paris, Pilar, who was eleven year old, returned to take classes at the Sacré-Coeur for two more years, leading a quiet family life. During a visit to Rome in 1873, Infanta Pilar and her sisters received their first communion from the hands of Pope Pius IX.

On 29 December 1874, Infanta Pilar's brother became King Alfonso XII after a pronunciamiento by Martinez Campos established him a king, ending the First Spanish Republic. The Spanish royal family was then reunited in Paris to celebrate New Year's Eve. On 14 January 1875, Alfonso arrived in Spain, followed in March by Infanta Isabella, who was proclaimed Princess of Asturias. Pilar, then thirteen years old, remained in France with her mother and younger sisters.

== Return to Spain ==
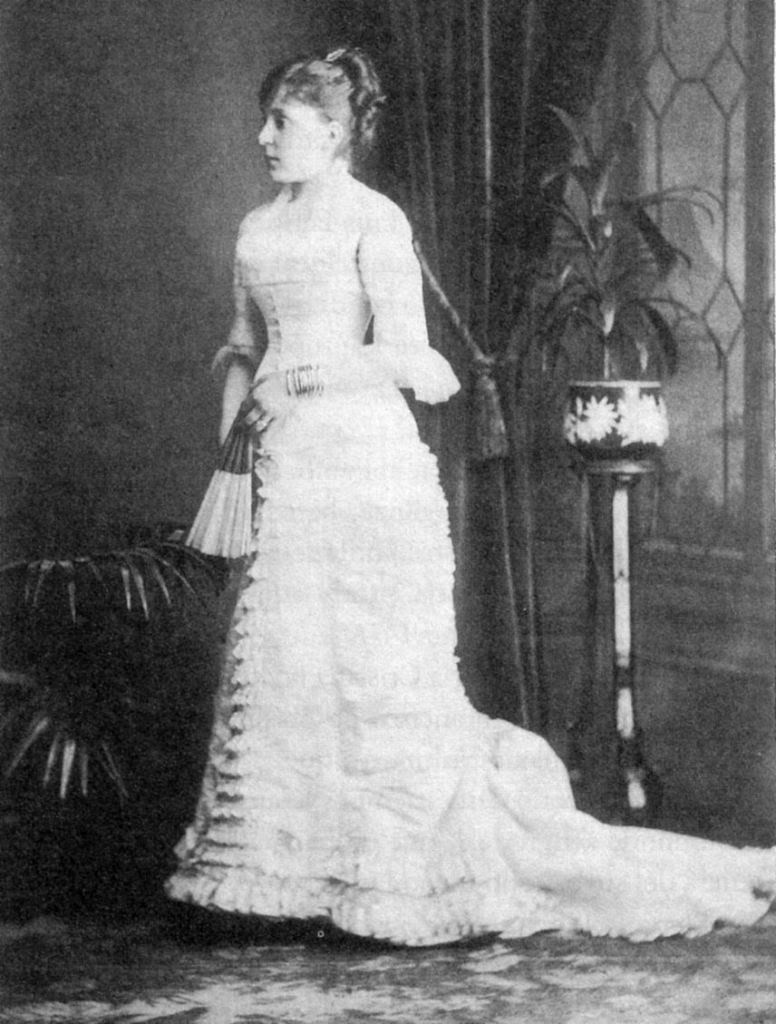
Infanta Pilar of Spain.

Antonio Cánovas del Castillo, President of the Council of Ministers, finally authorized the return of Queen Isabella in the summer 1876. After almost eight years living in exile, Infanta Pilar arrived from France by sea, landing in Santander on 30 July 1876. She had turned fifteen years old the previous month. King Alfonso and the Princess of Asturias welcomed their mother and sister, but they left the city the same night. Pilar, with her mother and younger sisters, remained in Santander. They made a trip to Ontaneda to go sea bathing and later traveled from Santander to El Escorial by train. On 13 October, they visited Madrid for seven hours. Isabella II was not allowed by the government to live in Madrid so Pilar, her mother and sisters stayed at El Escorial until the Queen decided to settle with her younger daughters in Seville.

For almost a year, between November 1876 and September 1877 Pilar lived with her mother and sisters at the Alcázar of Seville. Shortly after they arrived in Andalusia, Pilar's uncle Antoine, Duke of Montpensier, also came to live in the city with his family. Pilar and her sisters frequented their cousins, the children of their aunt Infanta Luisa Fernanda of Spain and the Duke of Montpesier who had arrived from exile in France almost at the same time, settling at the palace of San Telmo in Seville. The King and the Princess of Asturias came to Seville on a visit, spending eastern 1877 with them. King Alfonso, in love with their cousin Mercedes of Orleans, asked her hand in marriage. Isabella II opposed this union as she hated her brother-in-law who had spent a large fortune to help depose her. Upset with her son's choice of a bride and feeling neglected in Seville, in August, Isabella II decided to return to Paris and lived there permanently. On 28 September 1877, Infantas Pilar, Paz and Eulalia moved to Madrid living at the Royal Palace of Madrid with their eldest siblings. In November, Isabella left Spain for Paris. Pilar never saw her mother again.

In the fall 1877, a new life began for Infanta Pilar at the Royal Palace of Madrid where she had been born sixteen years earlier. Her education continued there under the supervision of her sister Isabella. The three young infantas lived in a wing of the royal palace separated from their two eldest siblings. This arrangement gave them some independence. Their care was supervised by the Marchioness of Santa Cruz. Pilar and her sister Paz, only one year her junior, were particularly close.

== Prospects of a marriage ==
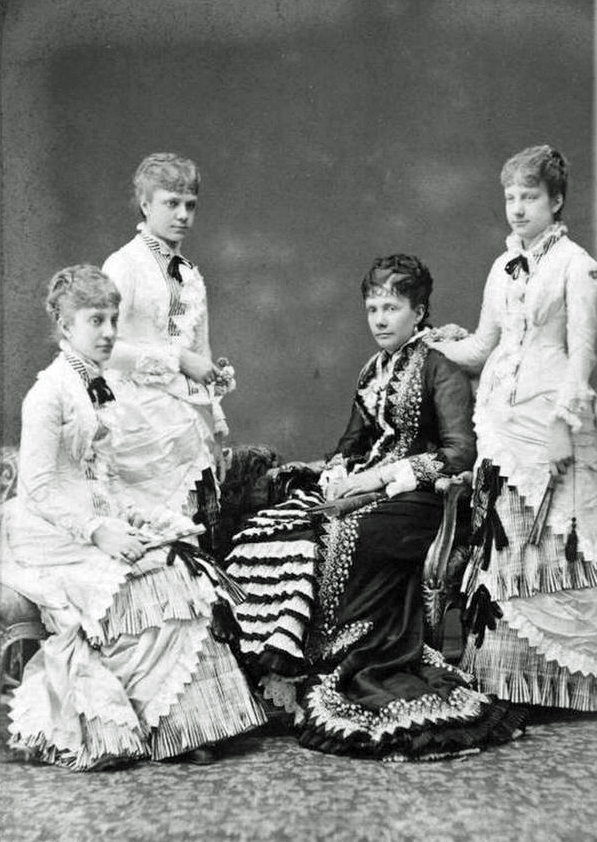
Infanta Pilar of Spain and her three sisters. From left to right: Pilar, Eulalia, Isabella and Paz

On 23 January 1878, at the Basilica of Nuestra Señora de Atocha in Madrid, Alfonso XII married his first cousin, Princess Maria de las Mercedes. Pilar, Paz and Eulalia were close to their cousin and sister-in-law, but Mercedes's marriage was brief. She had a miscarriage and died six months into her marriage of gastric fever on 26 June 1878. Pilar and her sister went to Seville to visit their uncle the Duke of Montpensier. At this time there was a project to marry Pilar to Montpensier's nephew Pierre, Duke of Penthièvre, a distant cousin. Isabella II opposed the idea, and the project did not go very far.

Infanta Pilar was third in the line of succession as neither King Alfonso nor Isabella, Princess of Asturias, had children by then. With no direct heir to the throne of Spain, it was a matter of urgency to find a husband for Pilar. Since the years of exile in Paris, it had been a cherished project between Queen Isabella II and her friend Empress Eugenie of France to arrange a marriage between their children Pilar and Napoleon, Prince Imperial. As the project had been on the back burner due to the fall of the French Empire and the exile in England, Isabella conceived the idea of an even more illustrious match for her daughter. Rudolf, Crown Prince of Austria, was in search of a wife. The Queen had her son Alfonso extend an invitation to Rudolf to come to Spain. Crown Prince Rudolf arrived on hunting expedition with his brother-in-law Prince Leopold of Bavaria. Rudolph met Pilar, and he was surprised to find that she was blond with clear eyes as he had thought that all Spanish women were brunettes, but he showed no particular interest in her, concentrating in game hunting.

Pilar was hoping to marry the Prince Imperial. They had met as children when Pilar and her sister were sometimes invited to play with him at the Tuileries Palace. The prince was then living in exile in England. He was due to pay an official visit to Madrid on his return from South Africa, where he was fighting with the British troops in the Anglo-Zulu War. Before his return, he was killed in South Africa on 1 June 1879. Pilar was deeply distraught by his death. She outlived him by only two months.

== Death ==
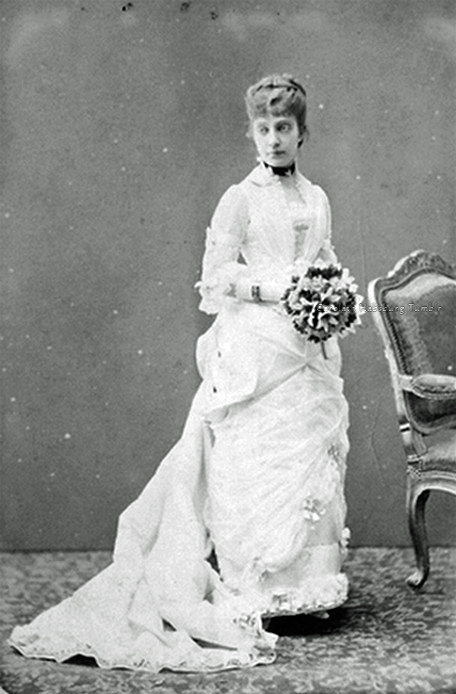
Infanta Pilar of Spain.

In the early summer 1879 it was organized that Pilar, Paz and Eulalia would spend some time in Eskoriatza, a small town known for its hot springs of mineral waters. On 10 July they arrived in Eskoriatza in the province of Gipuzkoa after a long and tiresome journey. In the following weeks, the sisters rested, leading a peaceful life dedicating their time to walks around the country side and reading. Infanta Paz noticed that Pilar looked pale and tired but since the sisters read each other's letters, Paz did not write about it to their eldest siblings to avoid alerting Pilar.

On 1 August the local people arranged a small fiesta in Pilar's honor. Wearing a white dress, and with a red beret on her head, Pilar attended the rustic fete and enjoyed its simple pleasures: donkey rides, bullocks and open-air dancing. That night, she complained of feeling tired. On 3 August, Pilar did not feel well and she stayed in bed all day. At night while she was reading Graziella by Alphonse de Lamartine, she had an acute attack of convulsions, lost consciousness, and never woke up again. She died, probably of tuberculous meningitis. However, the official medical report was diagnosed with serious effusion. She was buried a few days later in El Escorial.

Pilar's siblings Alfonso and Isabella arrived too late to see her alive. "Everyone", wrote Paz afterwards, "loved Pilar best of all". On the day of the Prince Imperial's death, 1 June 1879, a pressed violet - the flower of the Bonapartes - is said to have fallen out of Pilar's prayer book and to have broken at the stalk. According to that legend, when Pilar learned of his death some weeks later, she pined away and died of a broken heart.

Empress Eugenie wrote from Camden on 9 August 1879, to her mother the Countess of Montijo, "I have received a terrible blow with the death of Infanta Pilar who was so close to my son. You tell me that she felt sick after a dance in Eskoriatza. Could God have truly decided to take these two souls destined one to another." The Empress took one of the wreaths from his son's burial and sent it to Pilar's in El Escorial.

Infanta Paz, who was seventeen at the time, was deeply affected by her sister's death. Years later, Paz married Prince Ludwig Ferdinand of Bavaria, and decided to call her only daughter Pilar, in memory of her beloved sister. Thus, she introduced a Spanish name in the house of Wittelsbach.

== Titles, styles and honours ==
- 4 June 1861 – 5 August 1879: Her Royal Highness Infanta María del Pilar of Spain
- (Restoration (Spain)) : Dame Grand Cross of the Order of Queen Maria Luisa

== Bibliography ==
- Aronson, Theo. Venganza real: la Corona de España, 1829–1965. Ed.Grijalbo, 1968.
- Baviera, S.A.R. Princesa Pilar de; Chapman-Huston, Comandante Desmond. Alfonso XIII. Col. "Z"
- Infanta Paz. Cuatro revoluciones e intemedios: Setenta años de mi vida. Espasa-Calpe, Madrid, 1935.
- Infanta Eulalia; Memorias de Doña Eulalia de Borbón, Infanta de España (1864–1931). Ed. Juventud, 1954.
- Rubio, María José. La Chata: La Infanta Isabel de Borbón y la Corona de España. Madrid, La Esfera de los Libros, 2003. ISBN 84-9734-350-6
