= Infanta María de las Mercedes of Spain =

Infanta María de las Mercedes
- Princess Irakli Bagration of Mukhrani
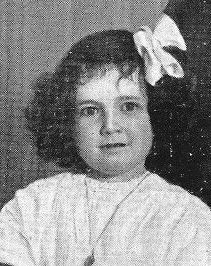
- María de las Mercedes, circa 1918
- Born: 3 October 1911; Palace of the Cuesta de la Vega, Madrid, Kingdom of Spain
- Died: 11 September 1953 (aged 41); Madrid, Spanish State
- Burial: El Escorial
- Spouse: Prince Irakli Bagration of Mukhrani (m. 1946)
- Issue: Princess Mariam; Prince Bagrat
Names
- Spanish: María de las Mercedes Teresa María de la Paz Fernanda Adalberta Cristina Antonia Isidra Raimunda Josefa Jesusa Fausta Francisca de Borja y Todos los Santos
- House: Wittelsbach (agnatic); Bourbon (enatic)
- Father: Prince Ferdinand of Bavaria
- Mother: Infanta María Teresa of Spain

Princess María de las Mercedes of Bavaria, Infanta of Spain (3 October 1911 – 11 September 1953) was a German-Spanish princess. She was the third wife of Georgian Prince Irakli Bagration of Mukhrani. Through her father, Prince Ferdinand of Bavaria, she was a member of the Bavarian House of Wittelsbach. Through her mother, Infanta María Teresa of Spain, she was a granddaughter of Alfonso XII and niece of Alfonso XIII.

== Early life ==
Princess María de las Mercedes of Bavaria, Infanta of Spain, was born on 3 October 1911 at the Palace of the Cuesta de la Vega, Madrid, to Prince Ferdinand of Bavaria and Infanta María Teresa of Spain. Her parents were first cousins, both grandchildren of Isabella II of Spain. Prior to her birth, her uncle, King Alfonso XIII, declared that any children born of her parents' marriage would be Infantes or Infantas of Spain. She was christened María de las Mercedes Teresa María de la Paz Fernanda Adalberta Cristina Antonia Isidra Raimunda Josefa Jesusa Fausta Francisca de Borja y Todos los Santos on 11 October 1911 at the Royal Palace of Madrid. Her godparents were Infanta María de la Paz of Spain (her paternal grandmother) and Prince Adalbert of Bavaria (her paternal uncle, for whom Prince Carlos of Bourbon-Two Sicilies stood proxy). She had two elder brothers, Luis Alfonso (1906–1983) and José Eugenio (1909–1966), and one younger sister, María del Pilar (1912–1918). Her mother died in 1912. Her father remarried her late mother's lady-in-waiting, Doña María Luisa de Silva y Fernandez de Henestrosa, Duchess of Talavera de la Reina.

Following the establishment of the Second Spanish Republic in 1931, the family fled to Germany.

== Marriage and issue ==
On 29 August 1946, Infanta María de las Mercedes married Prince Irakli Bagration of Mukhrani at the Miramar Palace in San Sebastián.

On the advice of Grand Duke Vladimir Kirillovich of Russia, Infante Juan, Count of Barcelona, head of the Spanish royal family in exile, recognised the union as dynastic. Consequently, her children were in the line of succession to the Spanish throne. In 1948, Irakli's sister Leonida married Grand Duke Vladimir.

They had two children:

- Princess Mariam Bagration of Mukhrani (born 27 June 1947)
- Prince Bagrat Bagration of Mukhrani (12 January 1949 – 20 March 2017)

Princess María de las Mercedes died on 11 September 1953 in Madrid from a pre-existing heart condition. She is buried in the Pantheon of the Princes at the Royal Site of San Lorenzo de El Escorial.

== Honours ==
- Dame of Honor and Devotion of the Sovereign Military Order of Malta

=== Arms ===
Heraldry of Princess María de las Mercedes of Bavaria, Infanta of Spain

Coat of Arms of Princess María de las Mercedes of Bavaria, Infanta of Spain

== Ancestors ==
Ancestors of Infanta María de las Mercedes of Spain

8. Prince Adalbert of Bavaria
4. Prince Ludwig Ferdinand of Bavaria
9. Infanta Amalia of Spain
2. Prince Ferdinand of Bavaria
10. Infante Francisco de Asís of Spain
5. Infanta María de la Paz of Spain
11. Isabella II of Spain
1. Infanta María de las Mercedes of Spain
12. Infante Francisco de Asís of Spain (= 10)
6. Alfonso XII of Spain
13. Isabella II of Spain (= 11)
3. Infanta María Teresa of Spain
14. Archduke Karl Ferdinand of Austria
7. Archduchess Maria Christina of Austria
15. Archduchess Elisabeth Franziska of Austria
