= Prince Ferdinand of Bavaria =

Bavarian prince (1884–1958)

Prince Ferdinand
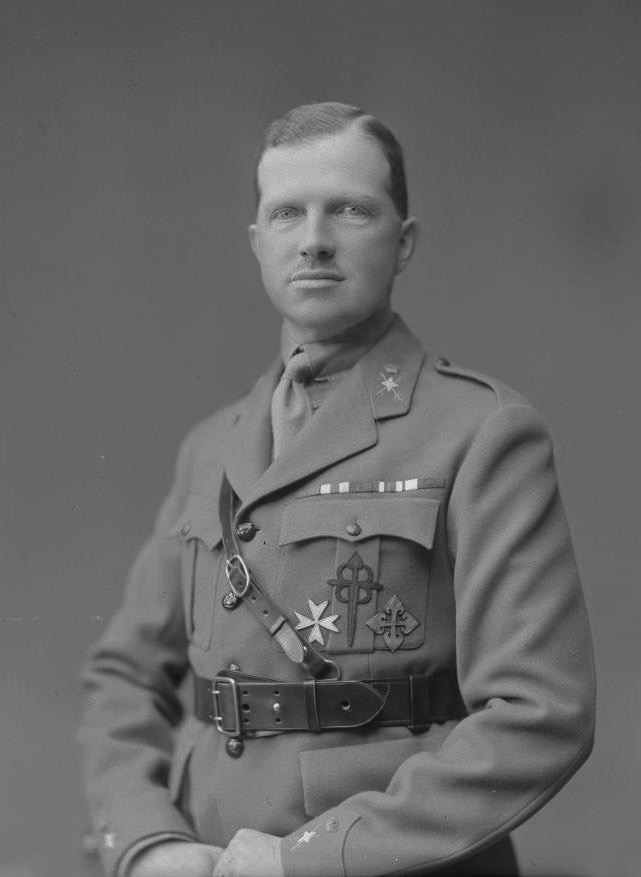
- Portrayed wearing the uniform of a brigadier general of the Spanish Army, c. 1920
- Born: 10 May 1884; Madrid, Spain
- Died: 5 April 1958 (aged 73); Madrid, Spain
- Spouses: Infanta Maria Teresa of Spain (m. 1906; died 1912) María Luisa de Silva y Fernández de Henestrosa, 1st Duchess of Talavera de la Reina (m. 1914; died 1955)
- Issue: Infante Luis Alfonso; Infante José Eugenio; María de las Mercedes, Princess Irakli Bagration of Mukhrani; Infanta María del Pilar
Names
- Ferdinand Maria Ludwig Franz von Assisi Isabellus Adalbert Ildefons Martin Bonifaz Joseph Isidro and Fernando María Luis Francisco de Asís Isabelo Adalberto Ildefonso Martín Bonifacio José Isidro
- House: Wittelsbach
- Father: Prince Ludwig Ferdinand of Bavaria
- Mother: Infanta María de la Paz of Spain

Prince Ferdinand Maria of Bavaria and Bourbon (Ferdinand Maria Ludwig Franz von Assisi Isabellus Adalbert Ildefons Martin Bonifaz Joseph Isidro; 10 May 1884 – 5 April 1958) was a prince of the House of Wittelsbach and Infante of Spain, the eldest son and child of Ludwig Ferdinand of Bavaria and Infanta María de la Paz of Spain. He became an Infante of Spain on 20 October 1905 and renounced his rights to the throne of the Kingdom of Bavaria in 1914.

== Early years ==
Prince Ferdinand María was born on 10 May 1884 at the Royal Palace of Madrid. His father was Prince Ludwig Ferdinand of Bavaria, son of Prince Adalbert of Bavaria and Infanta Amalia of Spain. His mother was Infanta María de la Paz of Bourbon, daughter of Queen Isabella II and King Francisco de Asís. Through his mother, Prince Ferdinand María was a first cousin of King Alfonso XIII, who was two years younger than him. Through his father, they were first cousins once removed, Prince Ludwig Ferdinand being first cousin of King Alfonso XII. He was baptized at the Royal Palace of Madrid.

In 1886, when he was two years old, his aunt the Queen Regent awarded him the Grand Cross of the Order of Charles III.

Shortly after his birth, his parents moved to Bavaria, where his two siblings Adalbert and Pilar were born. Prince Ludwig Ferdinand was the only member of the Bavarian Royal Family who always remained on friendly terms with his cousin, King Ludwig II (with the exception of Elisabeth, Empress of Austria). When Ludwig II was arrested at Neuschwanstein Castle in 1886, he called Ludwig Ferdinand for help; the latter immediately intended to follow this call, but was prevented from leaving Nymphenburg Palace by his uncle Luitpold who was about to take over government as the ruling Prince Regent. From 1878 the family resided at Palais Ludwig Ferdinand, their town-house in Munich.

He attended the Bavarian War Academy (Bayerische Kriegsakademie), attaining the rank of Second Lieutenant of Heavy Cavalry in the Bavarian Army. Then, he returned to Spain.

== Marriage and naturalisation ==
On 20 October 1905, King Alfonso XIII announced the marriage between his elder sister Infanta María Teresa and Prince Ferdinand Maria. The announcement was gazetted in the Gazeta de Madrid as follows:

"For the sake of My Royal Family and of the Nation, after having heard My Council of Ministers,
I shall give My Royal Consent to the contract of marriage between My Most Beloved and Most Dear Sister Infanta María Teresa and My Most Beloved Cousin Prince Ferdinand Maria of Bavaria and Bourbon.
My Government will inform the Cortes about this My Royal Resolution".

— ALFONSO, 20 October 1905

That same day, Prince Ferdinand Maria naturalised and the king granted unto him the title and prerogative of Infante of Spain, by grace. He was also invested a Knight of the Order of the Golden Fleece and was granted the Collar and Grand Cross of the orders of Charles III and Isabella the Catholic, respectively.

The wedding took place on 12 January 1906 at the Royal Palace of Madrid. Ferdinand and María Teresa had four children:

- Infante Luis Alfonso, Prince of Bavaria (6 December 1906 – 14 May 1983)
- Infante José Eugenio, Prince of Bavaria (26 March 1909 – 16 August 1966), married Dona María de la Asunción Solange de Mesía y de Lesseps, Countess of Odiel in 1933, and had issue.
- Infanta María de las Mercedes of Spain (3 October 1911 – 11 September 1953) married Georgian Prince Irakli Bagration of Mukhrani in 1946, and had issue.
- Infanta María del Pilar, Princess of Bavaria (15 September 1912 – 9 May 1918) died in childhood.

The couple settled down in Spain and moved into the newly built Cuesta de la Vega Palace in Madrid, which was their main residence.

== Career ==
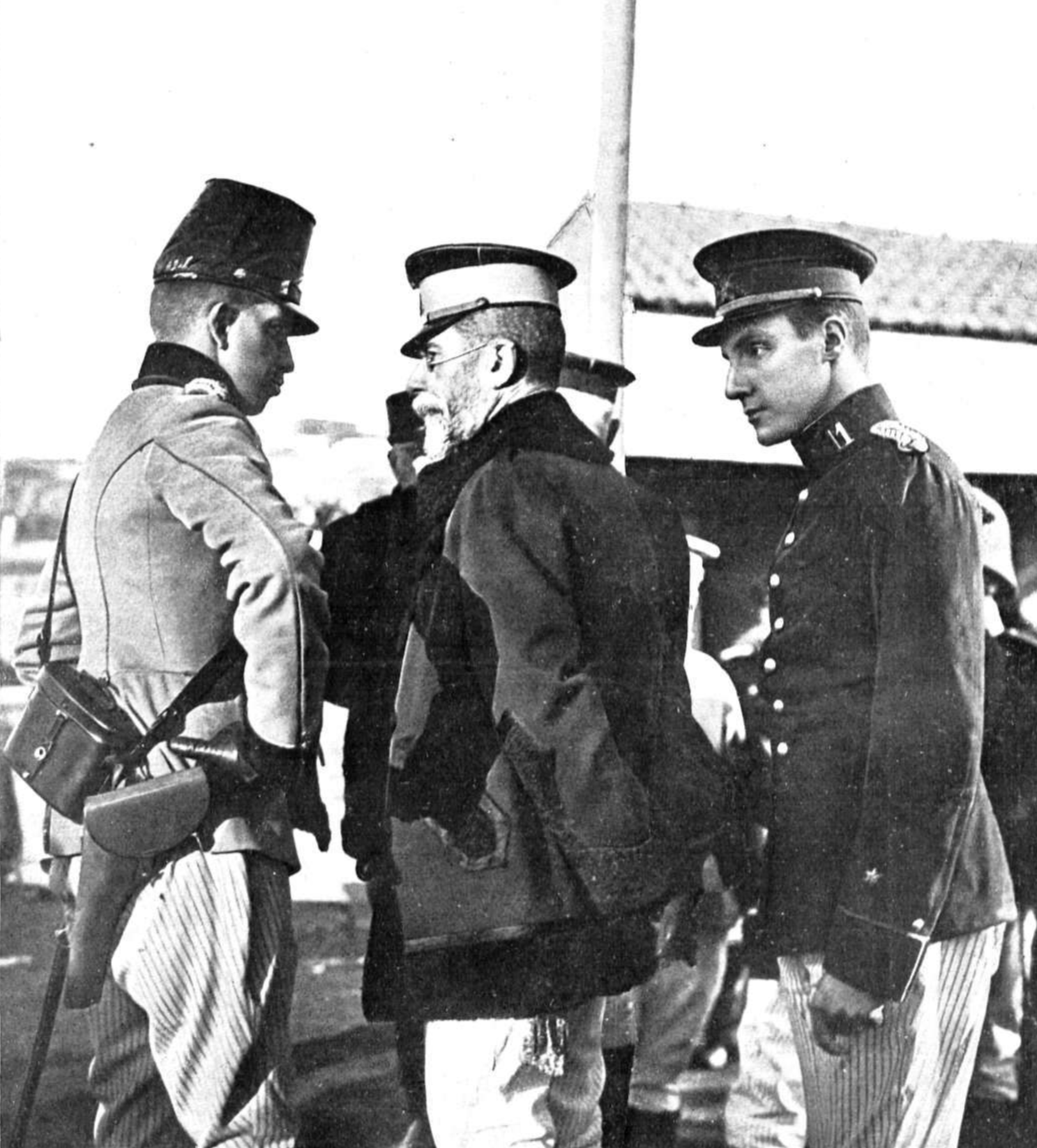
Ferdinand (left) with his cousin Infante Alfonso (right) in rayadillo breeks during the Rif War

Prince Ferdinand María was incorporated into the Spanish Army with the rank of cavalry lieutenant in 1905. He was commissioned into the 20th Hussars of Pavia Regiment. On 23 June 1908, he was promoted to Commander and was commissioned into the 12th Lusitania Rifle Regiment. He was moved to Africa with his regiment and took part in the Rif War.

This marriage and the granted royal rank in Spain meant that Ferdinand (also known as Infante don Fernando María de Baviera y de Borbón), the third-generation Spanish-Bavarian, committed himself to Spain. His second marriage with a Spanish noblewoman changed nothing in that respect.

Ferdinand married for a second time to María Luisa de Silva y Fernández de Henestrosa, Duchess of Talavera de la Reina, daughter of Luis de Silva y Fernández, 10th Count of Pie de Concha and his wife, Maria de los Dolores Fernández de Henestrosa y Fernández de Córdoba, on 1 October 1914 in Fuenterrabía, Spain. Maria Luisa was also granted the title Infanta of Spain.

== Later life ==
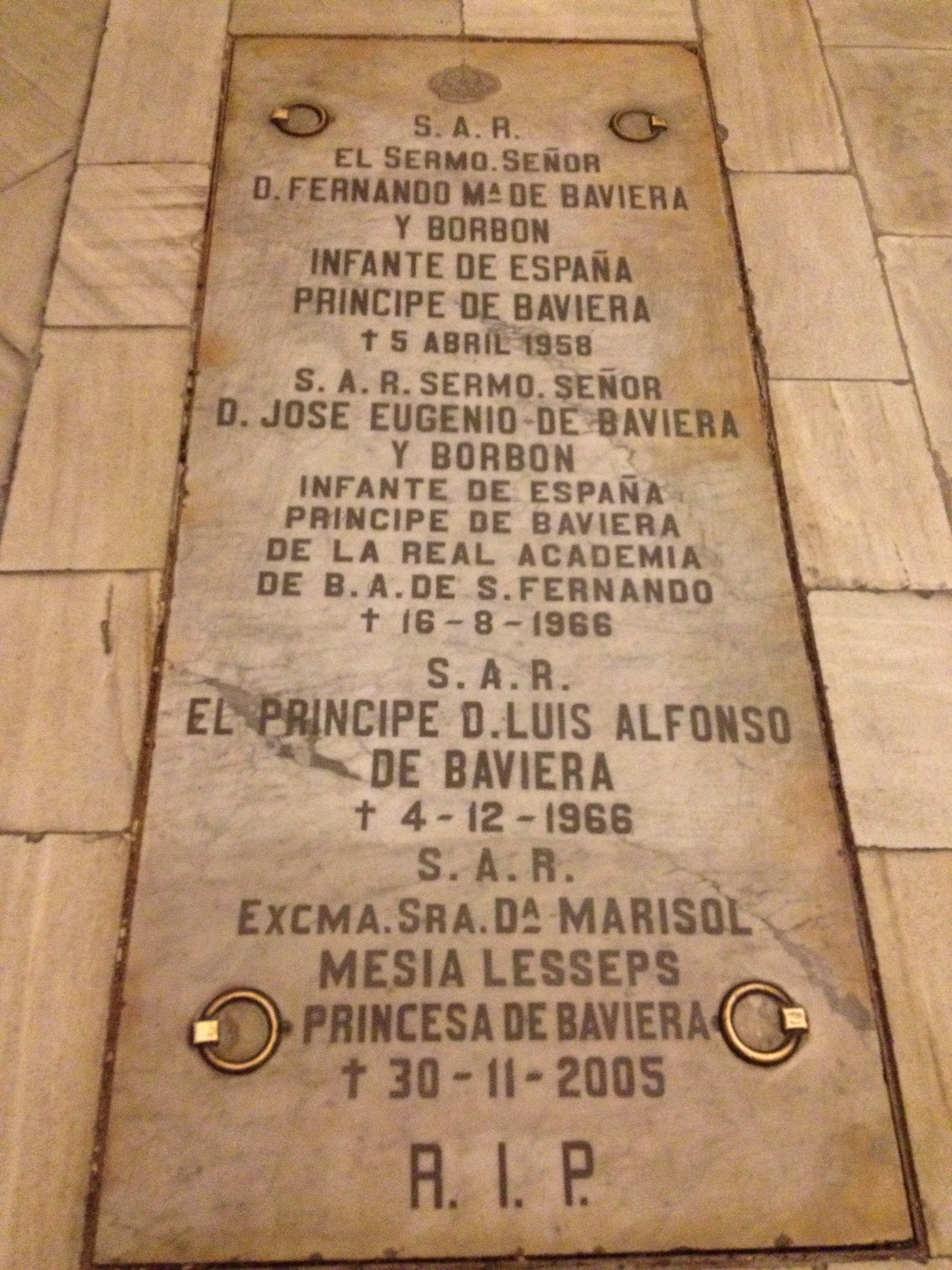
Tomb of Prince Ferdinand with members of his family in the crypt of the Almudena Cathedral

Ferdinand survived his mother by 12 years and his father by 9 years. He had Alfonso XIII of Spain as his first cousin and brother-in-law and Prince Carlos of Bourbon-Two Sicilies as another brother-in-law. Spanish claimants Infante Jaime, Duke of Segovia, and Infante Juan, Count of Barcelona, were his nephews.

== Titles, styles, honours and arms ==
As a member of the reigning family of Bavaria, Ferdinand was born a prince. In 1905, he was made infante of Spain.

- 10 May 1884 – 20 October 1905: His Royal Highness Prince Ferdinand of Bavaria
- 20 October 1905 – 5 April 1958: His Royal Highness Infante Don Fernando de Baviera y Borbón, prince of Bavaria

National orders and decorations

- Kingdom of Bavaria:
  - Knight of St. Hubert
  - Jubilee Medal
- Spain:
  - Grand Cross of the Order of Charles III, 18 November 1886; with Collar, 20 October 1905
  - Knight of the Golden Fleece, 20 October 1905
  - Grand Cross of the Order of Isabella the Catholic, 20 October 1905
  - Knight of the Royal Cavalry Armory of Seville, 1905
  - Knight of the Royal Nobility Corps of Madrid, 1909
  - Grand Commander of León of the Order of Santiago, 27 June 1910
  - Grand Cross of the Naval Merit Order, with White Decoration, 1922
  - Bailiff Grand Cross of Honour and Devotion of the Spanish Order of St. John

Foreign orders and decorations

- (Austrian Empire) (Kingdom of Hungary) Austria-Hungary:
  - Marian Cross of the Teutonic Order
  - Grand Cross of the Royal Hungarian Order of St. Stephen, 1909
- Denmark: Knight of the Elephant, 25 April 1907
- (Saxe-Coburg and Gotha) (Duchy of Saxe-Altenburg) (Saxe-Meiningen) Ernestine duchies: Grand Cross of the Saxe-Ernestine House Order
- France: Grand Cross of the Legion of Honour, December 1905
- Grand Duchy of Hesse: Grand Cross of the Ludwig Order, 23 August 1910
- Hohenzollern: Cross of Honour of the Princely House Order of Hohenzollern, 1st Class
- Norway: Grand Cross of St. Olav, with Collar, 10 August 1910
- Kingdom of Portugal:
  - Grand Cross of the Tower and Sword
  - Grand Cross of the Sash of the Two Orders
- Kingdom of Prussia: Knight of the Black Eagle
- Russian Empire:
  - Knight of St. Andrew
  - Knight of St. Alexander Nevsky, May 1909
  - Knight of the White Eagle
  - Knight of St. Anna, 1st Class
  - Knight of St. Stanislaus, 1st Class
- Kingdom of Saxony:
  - Grand Cross of the Albert Order, with Golden Star
  - Knight of the Rue Crown
- Sweden: Knight of the Seraphim, 18 December 1907
- United Kingdom: Honorary Grand Cross of the Royal Victorian Order, 9 April 1907

=== Arms ===
Heraldry of Prince Ferdinand of Bavaria

Coat of Arms of Ferdinand of Bavaria as Infante of Spain

== Ancestry ==
Ancestors of Prince Ferdinand of Bavaria

8. Ludwig I of Bavaria
4. Prince Adalbert of Bavaria
9. Princess Therese of Saxe-Hildburghausen
2. Prince Ludwig Ferdinand of Bavaria
10. Infante Francisco de Paula of Spain
5. Infanta Amalia of Spain
11. Princess Luisa Carlotta of the Two Sicilies
1. Prince Ferdinand of Bavaria
12. Infante Francisco de Paula of Spain (= 10)
6. Infante Francisco de Asís of Spain
13. Princess Luisa Carlotta of the Two Sicilies (= 11)
3. Infanta María de la Paz of Spain
14. Ferdinand VII of Spain
7. Isabella II of Spain
15. Princess Maria Cristina of the Two Sicilies
