= Mercedes of Spain =

Mercedes of Spain may refer to:

- Mercedes of Orléans, (1860–1878) queen of Spain in 1878 as the wife of Alfonso XII
- Mercedes, Princess of Asturias, (1880–1904) eldest daughter of Alfonso XII; heiress presumptive to the throne for her whole life
- Infanta María de las Mercedes of Spain, (1911–1953) daughter of Infanta Maria Teresa and granddaughter of Alfonso XII
- Princess Maria de las Mercedes of Bourbon-Two Sicilies, Countess of Barcelona, mother of Juan Carlos I
