= Infanta Isabel, Countess of Girgenti =

Infanta Isabel
- Princess of Asturias; Countess of Girgenti
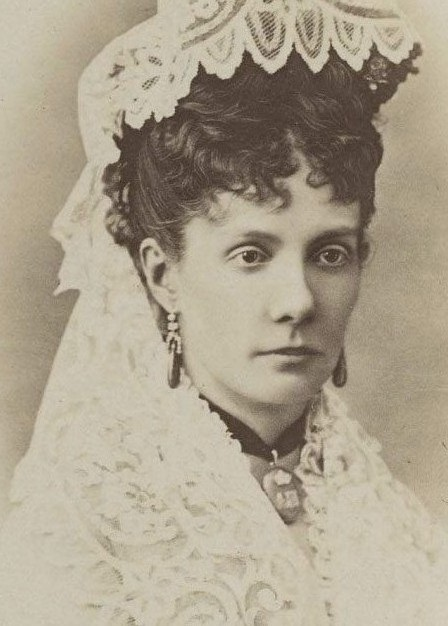
- Infanta Isabel in 1879
- Born: 20 December 1851; Royal Palace of Madrid, Madrid, Spain
- Died: 22 April 1931 (aged 79); Paris, France
- Burial: Royal Palace of La Granja de San Ildefonso
- Spouse: Prince Gaetan, Count of Girgenti (m. 1868; died 1871)
Names
- María Isabel Francisca de Asís Cristina Francisca de Paula Dominga de Borbón y Borbón
- House: Bourbon-Anjou
- Father: Francisco de Asís, Duke of Cádiz
- Mother: Isabella II

Infanta Isabel of Spain (Spanish: María Isabel Francisca de Asís Cristina Francisca de Paula Dominga; 20 December 1851 – 22 April 1931) was the eldest daughter of Queen Isabella II of Spain and her husband Francisco de Asís, Duke of Cádiz. She was the heiress presumptive to the Spanish throne from 1851 to 1857 (heiress to her mother Isabella II) and from 1874 to 1880 (heiress to her younger brother Alfonso XII). She was given the title Princess of Asturias, which is reserved for the heir to the Spanish crown. In 1868, she married Prince Gaetan, Count of Girgenti, son of King Ferdinand II of the Two Sicilies. Gaetan died by suicide three years later.

Infanta Isabel was a prominent figure at the Spanish royal court during the reign of her brother King Alfonso XII and during the minority of her nephew King Alfonso XIII. She was the most popular member of the Spanish royal family for most of her life. After the fall of the monarchy of Alfonso XIII, she refused the offer of officials of the Second Spanish Republic to continue to reside in Spain. She died in a matter of days after taking up a new life in exile in France.

== Childhood ==
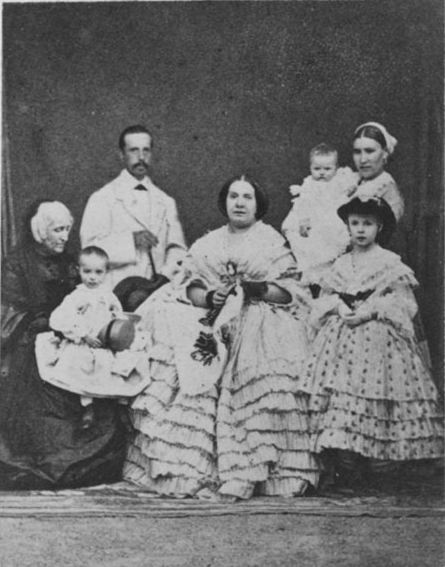
Infanta Isabel, age eight, with her family. From left to right: The Marchioness of Malpica with Alfonso, Prince of Asturias, on her lap; Francisco de Asís, Duke of Cádiz, Queen Isabella II of Spain, and their royal wet nurse holding Infanta María de la Concepción, and Infanta Isabel, 1860.

Born at the Royal Palace of Madrid on 20 December 1851, she was the eldest surviving daughter of Queen Isabella II and King Francisco de Asís. Her birth was eagerly awaited since her mother had previously given birth to a son who had died within hours. In the tumultuous age of Carlist uprisings and sporadic civil war, Isabel was immediately recognized as the heir presumptive to her mother's throne and as such was made Princess of Asturias.

The child was baptized the day after her birth with the names María Isabel Francisca de Asís. The marriage of her parents was unhappy. At age sixteen, Queen Isabella II had been married against her will to Francisco de Asis, Duke of Cádiz, who was twice her first cousin. The queen, who never overcame the antipathy towards her effeminate husband, found an outlet for her passionate nature, taking lovers. Historians and biographers attribute Infanta Isabel's paternity to José Ruiz de Arana y Saavedra (1826–1891), a young Spanish aristocrat and military officer. Ruiz de Arana was known to the queen from the palace's inner circles; his father, the Count of Sevilla La Nueva, was usher to ambassadors. The relationship between Queen Isabella and Ruiz de Arana lasted from 1851 to 1856. It was with some reluctance that King Francisco de Asís recognized Isabel as his daughter, as he would do subsequently with all the children Queen Isabella II bore during their troubled marriage.

On 2 February 1852 Isabella II was making a traditional visit to the Royal Basilica of Our Lady of Atocha, introducing her daughter to the public, when she was stabbed by a mad priest. The Queen was saved by the thickness of her corset; the injury was not life-threatening. As she grew up, Isabel began to appear in public in the company of her parents. She became popularly known by the affectionate nickname La Chata – a reference to her snub or "button" nose. She spent her early years as an only child. There was a six-year gap between Isabel and her next surviving sibling, the future King Alfonso XII. Three more sisters who survived past early childhood later completed the family. Isabel lost her title as Princess of Asturias upon her brother's birth on 28 November 1857 and took the title and rank of infanta instead.

Infanta Isabel was raised separately from the rest of her siblings. The relationship between King Francisco de Asís and his children was cold and formal. Queen Isabella II was preoccupied with her turbulent reign and her private life alternated between periods of great affection towards her children and the distant approach to childhood that was the custom of the time. She received a much better education than her mother and was the only one among her siblings raised during her mother's reign. Emphasis was put on languages, and the young Infanta was very interested in music and horsemanship, hobbies she enjoyed throughout her life. Isabel's governess, teacher, and friend was Scottish-born Fanny Calderón de la Barca, well-known author of Life in Mexico.

== Marriage ==
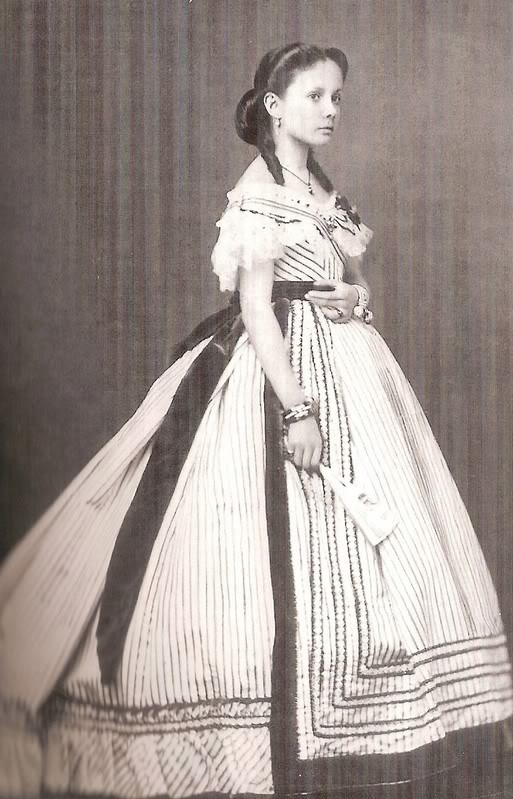
Infanta Isabel at age fourteen in 1865

With only a brother of delicate health ahead of her in the line of succession to the throne, there was great interest in arranging an early marriage for Infanta Isabella that would provide descendants. Leopoldo O'Donnell, Duke of Tetuan, Isabella II's prime minister, conceived the idea to marry her to Prince Amadeo of Savoy whose sister Maria Pia had recently married Luís I of Portugal. Queen Isabella disliked the proposal, but agreed to an interview between her fourteen-year-old daughter and the twenty-year-old Savoy prince. In September 1865, Amadeo met Infanta Isabel in Zarauz, where the Spanish family was on vacation. The project failed.

For political reasons, Isabella II had to recognize the unification of Italy under the Savoy crown, and in order to compensate her cousins from the Bourbon dynasty of the Kingdom of the Two Sicilies, who were upset at this recognition, the ultra-conservative party at the Spanish court, headed by King Francisco de Asís, convinced the queen to arrange the marriage of their eldest daughter with one of the half-siblings of the recently deposed King Francis II of the Two Sicilies, Prince Gaetan, Count of Girgenti (1846–1871), son of King Ferdinand II of the Two Sicilies and Archduchess Maria Theresa of Austria. Prince Gaetan had recently lost his mother and one of his younger brothers, and his family was in financial straits. Gaetan was a first cousin of both Isabel's mother and father.

In April 1868, Prince Gaetan arrived in Spain, and the wedding was quickly arranged to take place a few weeks later. Neither Infanta Isabel nor Gaetan were enthusiastic about the project. Gaetan was tall and good-hearted, but penniless and plagued by ill health. He was known for his lack of intellect. Infanta Isabel was short, blond, with clear blue eyes and a small up-turned nose. She was dutiful, conservative and headstrong.

== Countess of Girgenti ==
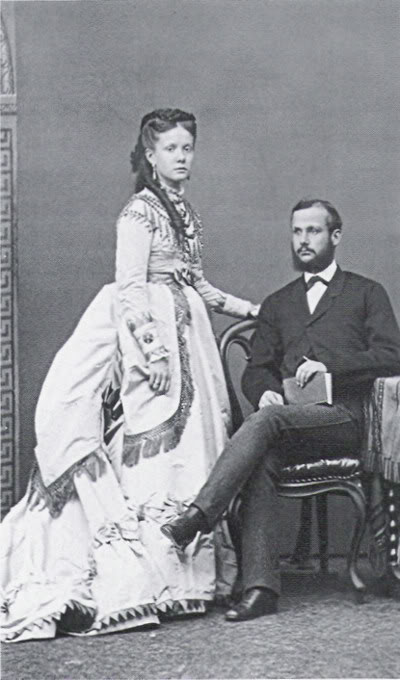
Infanta Isabel and Prince Gaetan of two Sicillies, 1868

Isabel's marriage took place amidst great pomp on 13 May 1868. Upon his marriage, Isabella II bestowed on Gaetan the title of Infante. After the wedding, the young couple embarked on a long honeymoon that took them first to visit her new family-in-law residing at the Palazzo Farnese in Rome. Two months later, the young couple went to the Austrian court, where Gaetano's maternal relatives lived. On their way back to Spain, while visiting Emperor Napoleon III and Empress Eugénie at Fontainebleau, they received the news of the Glorious Revolution that cost Isabella II her throne. Gaetan rushed to enter Spain and fought in defense of the monarchy in the Battle of Alcolea, a defeat that marked the end of the reign of Isabella II, who crossed the border into France with the royal family. In exile, the deposed queen settled in Paris, where Infanta Isabel was waiting for her mother. Initially, Infanta Isabel and Gaetan also lived in Paris in a house that belonged to Gaetan's uncle Prince Louis, Count of Aquila.

Gaetan was plagued by ill health and depression. For two years, the couple embarked on a series of trips through Europe, visiting Austria, Germany and England, searching in vain for a solution to Gaetan's health. In the summer of 1870, the Counts of Girgenti settled in Lucerne, Switzerland, in hopes of living in peace and anonymity. With the help of his two aides-de-camps, Gaetan managed to conceal from his wife for as long as he could the true nature of his illness: he was an epileptic. One day he had a seizure in front of his wife, who had no prior warnings about the true nature of his illness.

In the early summer of 1871, Isabel and her husband stayed in Geneva to join the rest of the Spanish royal family, which had escaped disturbances in Paris. In August 1871, the Count of Girgenti returned to Lucerne. Early in a pregnancy, Infanta Isabel suffered a miscarriage in September 1871. The loss of his child, the loss of the Spanish crown, and his declining health contributed to Gaetan sinking into a deep depression and he attempted suicide by jumping from a window. After that, he was never allowed to be alone, and between Isabel and Gaetan's adjutants, Gaetan was constantly supervised. However, on 26 November 1871, while they were staying in a hotel in Lucerne, Gaetan managed to lock himself in a room and shoot himself in the head. He was found still alive, but died shortly thereafter.

A young widow barely twenty years old, Infanta Isabel, who had become greatly attached to her husband, mourned his tragic death. She moved to the Palacio Castilla in Paris with her mother, the ex-Queen Isabella. Over the next three years, the infanta led a quiet family life over-seeing the education of her three younger sisters; visiting her father, the ex-King consort Don Francisco de Asís, who lived estranged from his wife in Épinay; and, above all, concerned about the future of her brother Alfonso, who was finishing his education in Vienna. In 1872 and 1873, Infanta Isabel traveled frequently to Munich to be with her aunt, the Infanta Amalia of Spain, and to Vienna to stay close to her brother as a guest of Archduchess Marie Karoline, to whom she had become very close during her marriage to Gaetan (the archduchess's nephew). Behind the scenes, Infanta Isabel worked to promote the restoration of the Spanish monarchy in the person of her brother in an agreement with the Spanish politician Antonio Cánovas del Castillo, who worked from Madrid on behalf of Alfonso.

== Later life ==
On 29 December 1874 Infanta Isabel's brother Alfonso XII was called to the Spanish throne after a pronunciamiento by Martinez Campos established him as king, ending the First Spanish Republic. The Spanish royal family was then reunited in Paris to celebrate New Year's Eve. On 14 January 1875 Alfonso XII arrived in Spain. The following month, Infanta Isabel was called by the government to come back to Spain as the first lady at court and heiress presumptive to the throne. On 5 March Infanta Isabel embarked from Marseille to make her entrance in Madrid two days later.

On March 24, 1875, Isabel was once again proclaimed Princess of Asturias as heiress to the Spanish crown. The young princess and her brother enjoyed considerable popularity during this period, and several prospects were presented to her to remarry. Archduke Ludwig Salvator of Austria, who was already living in Spain, was the government's first choice, but once his eccentric behavior became known this idea was abandoned. Another candidate was Prince Arnulf of Bavaria, but Isabel did not wish to remarry, and her brother—to whom she was very attached—ultimately respected her wishes.

During the first years of her brother's reign, Isabel worked constantly to promote the cause of the monarchy and was a great asset to her brother. After their mother Queen Isabella II returned to live permanently in France, Isabel's three youngest sisters were placed under her care, and she provided a good education for them. The two eldest sisters, Infantas Pilar and Paz, were pliable and did not give her trouble, but Isabel clashed with the youngest sister, the spirited Eulalia.

Isabel also served as a guide to her young cousin Princess Mercedes of Orléans, who married her brother in 1878 and replaced her as the first lady of the kingdom as the new queen. The marriage of her brother allowed her more time for her hobbies and travelling. Following Queen Mercedes' early death in the same year as her marriage, Isabel chose Archduchess Maria Christina of Austria as her new sister-in-law and promoted her as a wife to her brother. She was a niece of Isabel's good friend Archduchess Maria Karoline of Austria, who had been a second mother to Gaetan and his siblings.

The early death of her brother in 1885 was a terrible blow to Isabel, who had treasured their relationship. She was an influential figure throughout the regency of Queen Maria Cristina and gave her widowed sister-in-law support; she became a second mother to the children of her late brother.

== Last years ==
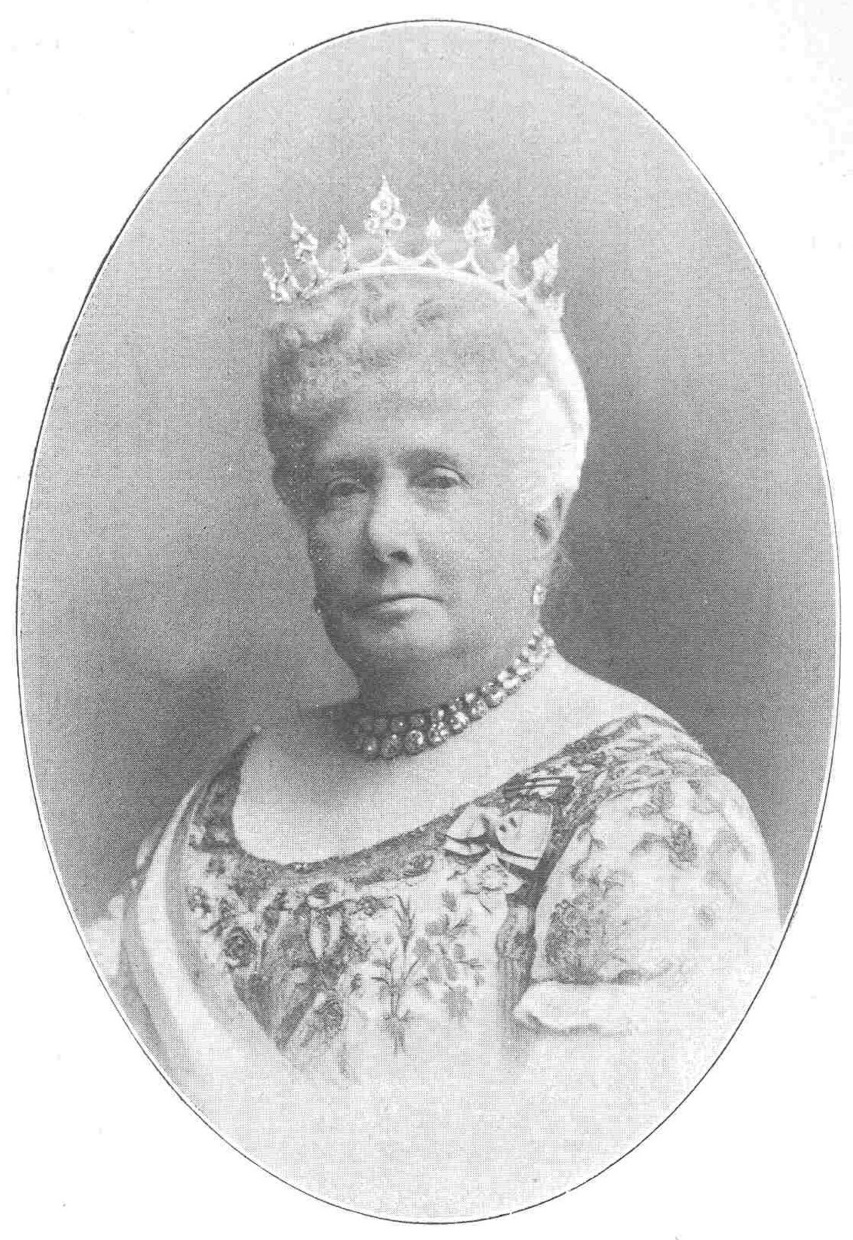
Infanta Isabel late in her life. Photograph by Kaulak

Isabel was reportedly very popular and respected in Spain. In 1885, a cruiser of the Spanish Navy, the Infanta Isabel, was named after her. One of her most significant public activities was her 1910 trip to Buenos Aires, Argentina, as a representative of the Spanish Crown on the occasion of the centennial celebration of the May Revolution that was considered the starting point of the Argentine War of Independence. A street in Buenos Aires, the Paseo de la Infanta Isabel, was named after her. There is also a similarly named street in Madrid.

Isabel died on 22 April 1931, at the age of 79, in exile in France. Her death occurred five days after her nephew, King Alfonso XIII, had lost the Spanish throne and the entire Spanish royal family had gone into exile. Following the republican victory in Spain, Isabel was informed by the republican authorities that there was no need for her to go into exile—a testament to her popularity—but she voluntarily chose to exile herself with the rest of her family. She left most of her jewels to her nephew, and her famous Mellerio Shell Tiara subsequently descended to the current Spanish royal family and is frequently worn by Queen Sofía. In 1991, King Juan Carlos ordered the transfer of her remains to Spain from France; her remains were then entombed in the chapel of the Royal Palace of La Granja de San Ildefonso near Segovia, and a salon in the palace was subsequently renamed in her honor.

There is a monumental sculpture of Isabel at Parque del Oeste, a public park in Madrid. Moreover, in the palace park grounds of the Royal Palace of La Granja de San Ildefonso, there is another full-size marble sculpture of Isabel with a bouquet of roses.

== Honours ==
National

- (Restoration (Spain)) Spanish Royal Family: 886th Honorary Knight of the Order of the Golden Fleece
- (Restoration (Spain)) Spanish Royal Family: Knight Grand Cross of the Order of Charles III
- (Restoration (Spain)) Spanish Royal Family: 473rd Dame of the Order of Queen Maria Luisa

Foreign

- (Austria-Hungary) Austrian-Hungarian Imperial and Royal family: Dame of the Order of the Starry Cross
- (Kingdom of Portugal) Portuguese Royal Family: Dame of the Order of Saint Isabel

=== Arms ===
Coat of arms as Infanta and Countess of Girgenti

Isabella 's arms as Princess of Asturias

Coat of arms as an Infanta of Spain

Isabella's lesser coat of arms (Posthumous)

== Notes ==
Infanta Isabel, Countess of Girgenti House of Bourbon Cadet branch of the Capetian dynasty Born: 20 December 1851 Died: 23 April 1931
Spanish royalty
Preceded by Isabella (II)	Princess of Asturias; 1851–1857	Succeeded by Alfonso (XII)
Vacant First Spanish Republic Title last held by Emanuele Filiberto	Princess of Asturias; 1874–1880	Succeeded by Mercedes
