= Prince Gaetan, Count of Girgenti =

Prince of the Two Sicilies; fifth son of Ferdinand II

Prince Gaetan
- Count of Girgenti
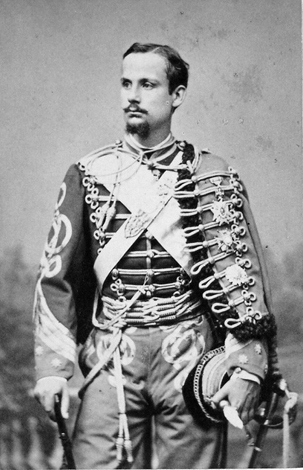
- Prince Gaetan c. 1868
- Born: 12 January 1846; Naples, Kingdom of the Two Sicilies
- Died: 26 November 1871 (aged 25); Lucerne, Switzerland
- Burial: El Escorial, Madrid, Spain
- Spouse: Isabella, Princess of Asturias (m. 1868)
Names
- Italian: Gaetano Marie Federico
- House: Bourbon-Two Sicilies
- Father: Ferdinand II of the Two Sicilies
- Mother: Maria Theresa of Austria

Prince Gaetan of the Two Sicilies, Count of Girgenti (Italian: Gaetano Marie Federico, Principe di Borbone delle Due Sicilie, Conte di Girgenti) (12 January 1846, Naples, Two Sicilies – 26 November 1871, Lucerne, Switzerland) was the seventh child of Ferdinand II of the Two Sicilies and his wife Maria Theresa of Austria. Gaetan was a member of the House of Bourbon-Two Sicilies and consort to Isabella, Princess of Asturias, twice the recognized heir presumptive to the throne of Spain. Through this union, Gaetan was created an Infante of Spain.

== Marriage and later life ==
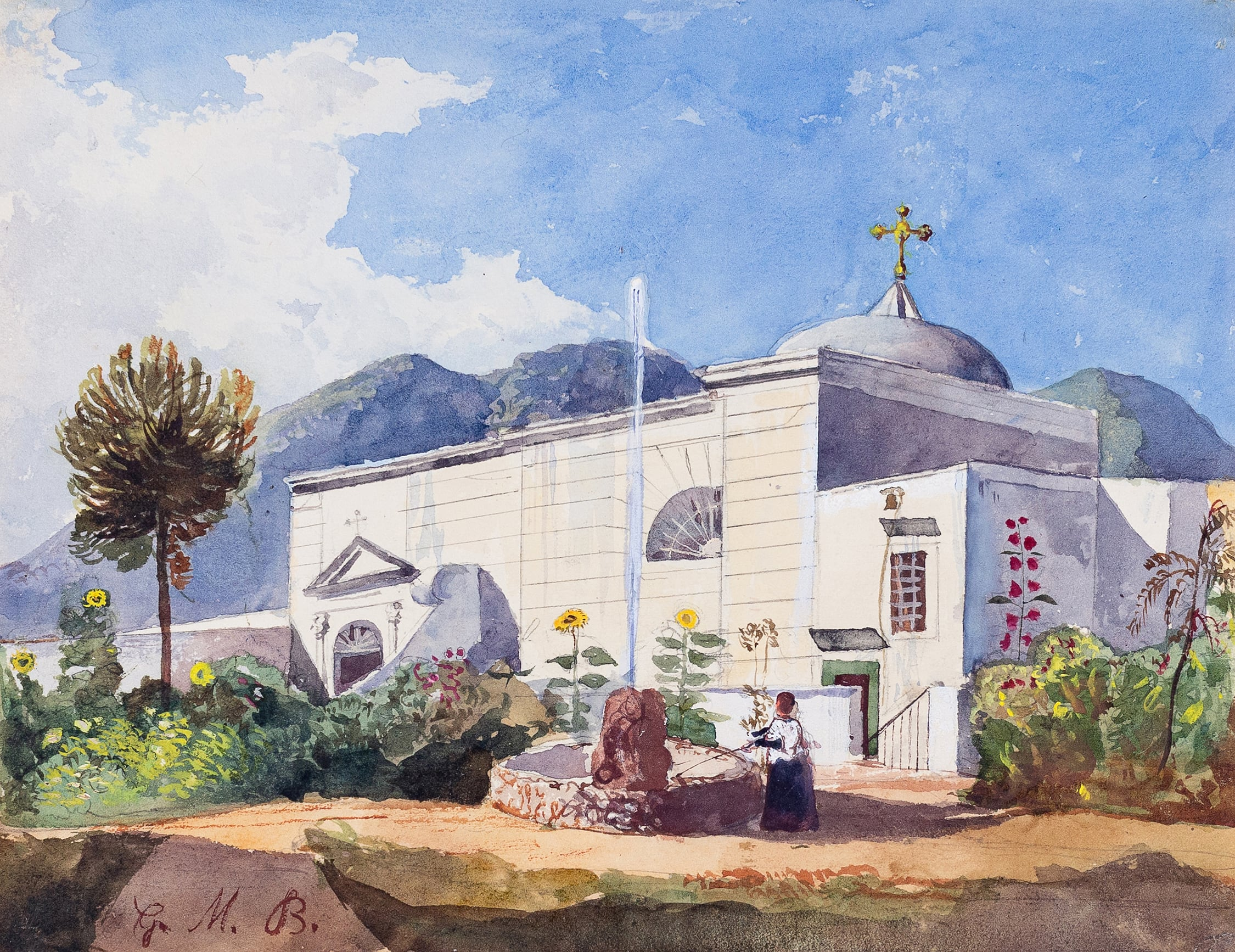
Painting (Circa 1856) by Prince Gaetan, with additions by Giacinto Gigante, of a church and fountain on the Neapolitan Coast

Gaetan married Isabella, Princess of Asturias, eldest surviving child of Francis, Duke of Cádiz and Isabella II of Spain, on 13 May 1868 in Madrid. Gaetan was a first cousin to both of Isabella's parents. Their union was intended to end a feud between the Neapolitan Bourbons and the Spanish Bourbons following Spain's recognition of the Kingdom of Italy unified under the House of Savoy. The ceremony took place shortly before Spain's Glorious Revolution which brought an end to Isabella II's reign.

Gaetan and Isabella's marriage proved unhappy. For two years, Gaetan traveled throughout Europe visiting relatives in major cities including Vienna. A troubled and depressed man, Gaetan experienced weak health and epilepsy. He had unsuccessfully attempted suicide at least once before shooting himself in the head in his hotel room in Lucerne, Switzerland. Isabella returned to Spain in 1874 and did not remarry. Their brief union produced no issue.

In the course of his short life Gaetan pursued an active military career, including commissions in the Bourbon Neapolitan army and subsequently, in exile, as colonel of a regiment of lancers in Austria. He also saw service with the Papal army, fighting against Garibaldi at the Battle of Mentana, 1867. During the 1868 revolution against Queen Isabella II of Spain, the Prince, aged only 22, commanded the Pavia Hussars regiment and fought at the Battle of Alcolea.

Prince Gaetan's arms

== Ancestry ==
Ancestors of Prince Gaetan, Count of Girgenti

8. Ferdinand I of the Two Sicilies
4. Francis I of the Two Sicilies
9. Archduchess Maria Carolina of Austria
2. Ferdinand II of the Two Sicilies
10. Charles IV of Spain
5. Infanta María Isabel of Spain
11. Princess Maria Luisa of Parma
1. Prince Gaetan, Count of Girgenti
12. Leopold II, Holy Roman Emperor
6. Archduke Charles, Duke of Teschen
13. Infanta Maria Luisa of Spain
3. Archduchess Maria Theresa of Austria
14. Frederick William, Prince of Nassau-Weilburg
7. Princess Henrietta of Nassau-Weilburg
15. Burgravine Louise Isabelle of Kirchberg
