= Princess Pilar of Bavaria =

Bavarian princess (1891–1987)

Princess Pilar
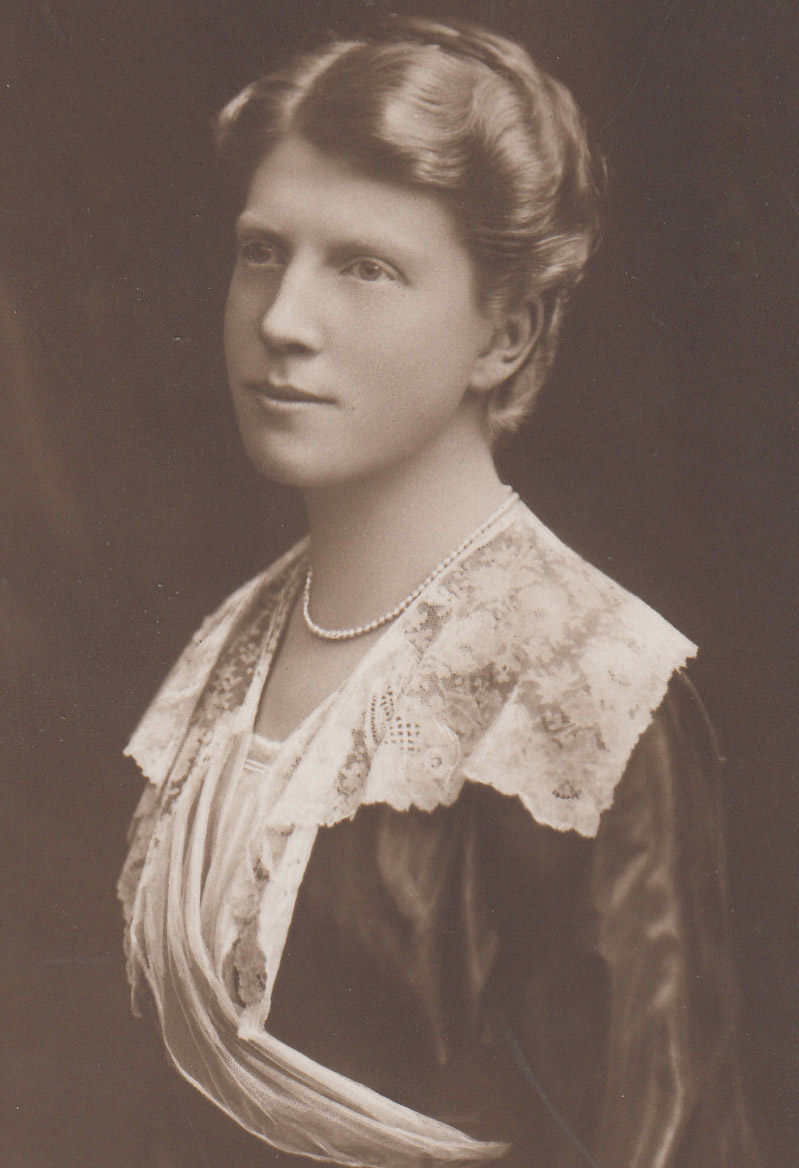
- Portrait c. 1917
- Born: 13 March 1891; Munich, Kingdom of Bavaria, German Empire
- Died: 29 January 1987 (aged 95); Munich, West Germany
Names
- Maria del Pilar Eulalia Antonia Isabella Ludovika Franziska Josepha Rita Euphrasia
- House: Wittelsbach
- Father: Prince Ludwig Ferdinand of Bavaria
- Mother: Infanta Maria de la Paz of Spain

Princess Pilar of Bavaria (13 March 1891 – 29 January 1987) was a member of House of Wittelsbach

== Early life ==
Princess Pilar was born on 13 March 1891 at Nymphenburg Palace in Munich, Kingdom of Bavaria. She was the only daughter and youngest child born to Prince Ludwig Ferdinand of Bavaria and his wife, Infanta Paz of Spain. Within her immediate family circle and domestic court architecture, she was affectionately called by the childhood pet name "Pili". She spent her formative youth raised at the family's Bavarian estates alongside her brothers, Ferdinand and Adalbert, receiving a strict domestic education conducted by tutors that focused heavily on modern languages, music, and fine arts.

== Marriage negotiations ==
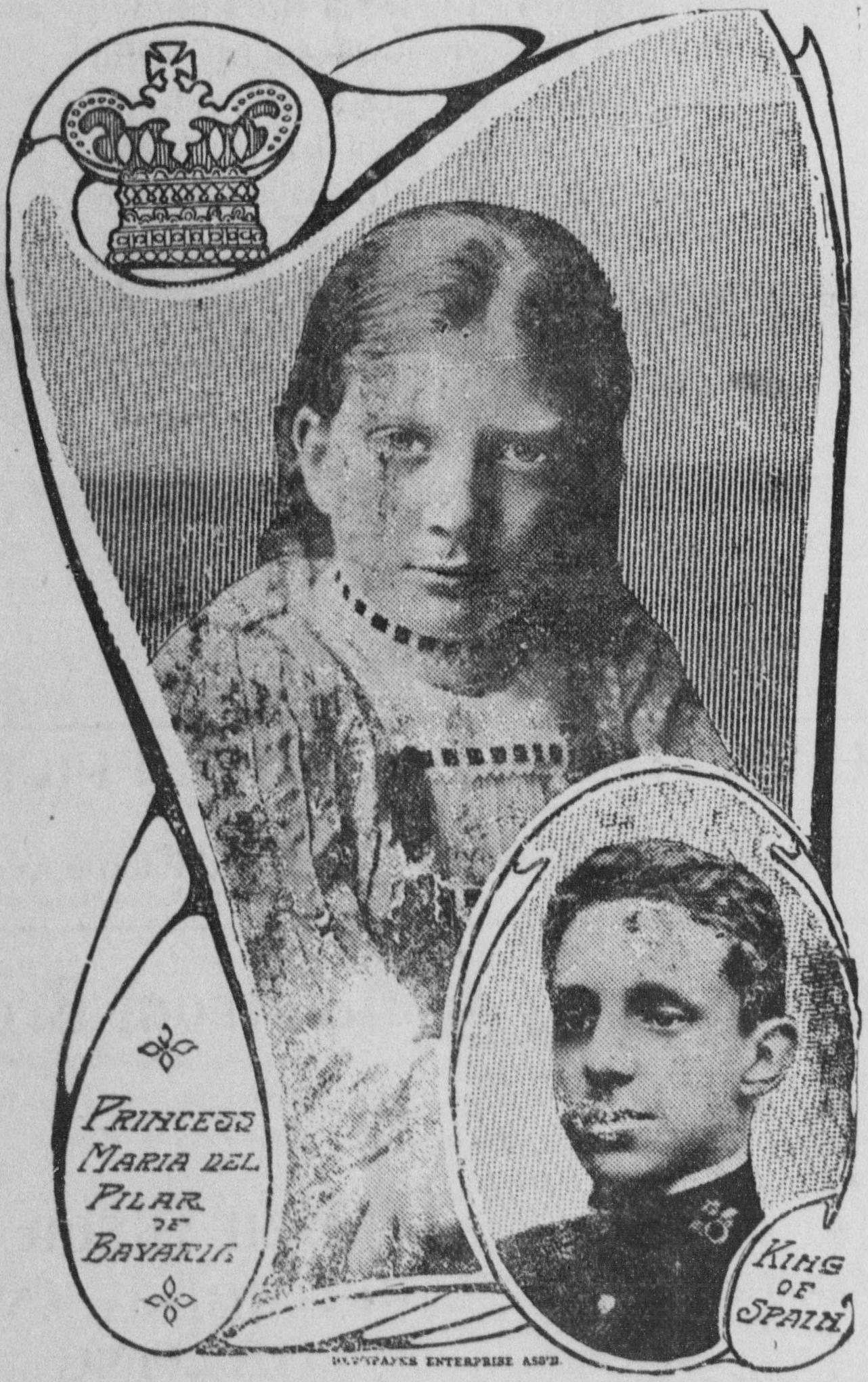
Pilar and her cousin Alfonso XIII, 1904

In February 1904, diplomatic rumors circulated regarding a potential marital alliance between Princess Pilar and her first cousin, King Alfonso XIII of Spain, to reinforce the dynastic bonds between the House of Wittelsbach and the House of Bourbon. However, her young age posed a difficult problem for the marriage negotiations, ultimately Alfonso eventually married Princess Victoria Eugenie of Battenberg in 1906, a granddaughter of Queen Victoria.

In April 1909, The New York Times and contemporary European journals widely reported on a proposed marriage engagement and secret betrothal between Princess Pilar and King Manuel II of Portugal. The diplomatic alliance was heavily negotiated by royalist factions to stabilize the political influence of the Braganza line across the Iberian Peninsula, but the plans were ultimately abandoned following the institutional collapse of the Portuguese monarchy in October 1910.

In March 1914, international press Underwood & Underwood reported incorrectly announced her engagement to Rupprecht, Crown Prince of Bavaria, who had been widowed since the death of his first wife, Duchess Marie Gabrielle in Bavaria, in 1912. The report proved false, and Princess Pilar never married.

== Later life and career ==
Following the institutional dissolution of the German monarchies during the German Revolution of 1918–19, Pilar remained in Munich and established an independent professional career as an artist and author. Having studied under prominent Munich painters, she specialized in oil and watercolor historical landscapes, travel illustrations, and botanical studies, frequently exhibiting her artwork under her legal name within the Bavarian art market, Princess Pilar also headed the Bavarian branch of the German Red Cross for 40 years.

Her film reels dating 1925–1930, shot using a 35 mm handheld camera, are a rare example of early private film footage.

During World War II, her family's residences were impacted by Allied bombing raids, but she remained in Bavaria to manage the preservation of the Wittelsbach family's private art collections and historical archives. In her post-war decades, she authored several biographical works and travelogues, including a prominent 1932 biography of her cousin, King Alfonso XIII of Spain, co-written with major contemporary journalists. Pilar remained unmarried and resided at Nymphenburg Palace until her death on 29 January 1987 at the age of 95.

== Honours ==
- Spain : 901st Dame of the Order of Queen Maria Luisa - .
