= Francisco de Asís, Duke of Cádiz =

King consort of Spain from 1846 to 1868

Francisco de Asís
- King of Spain
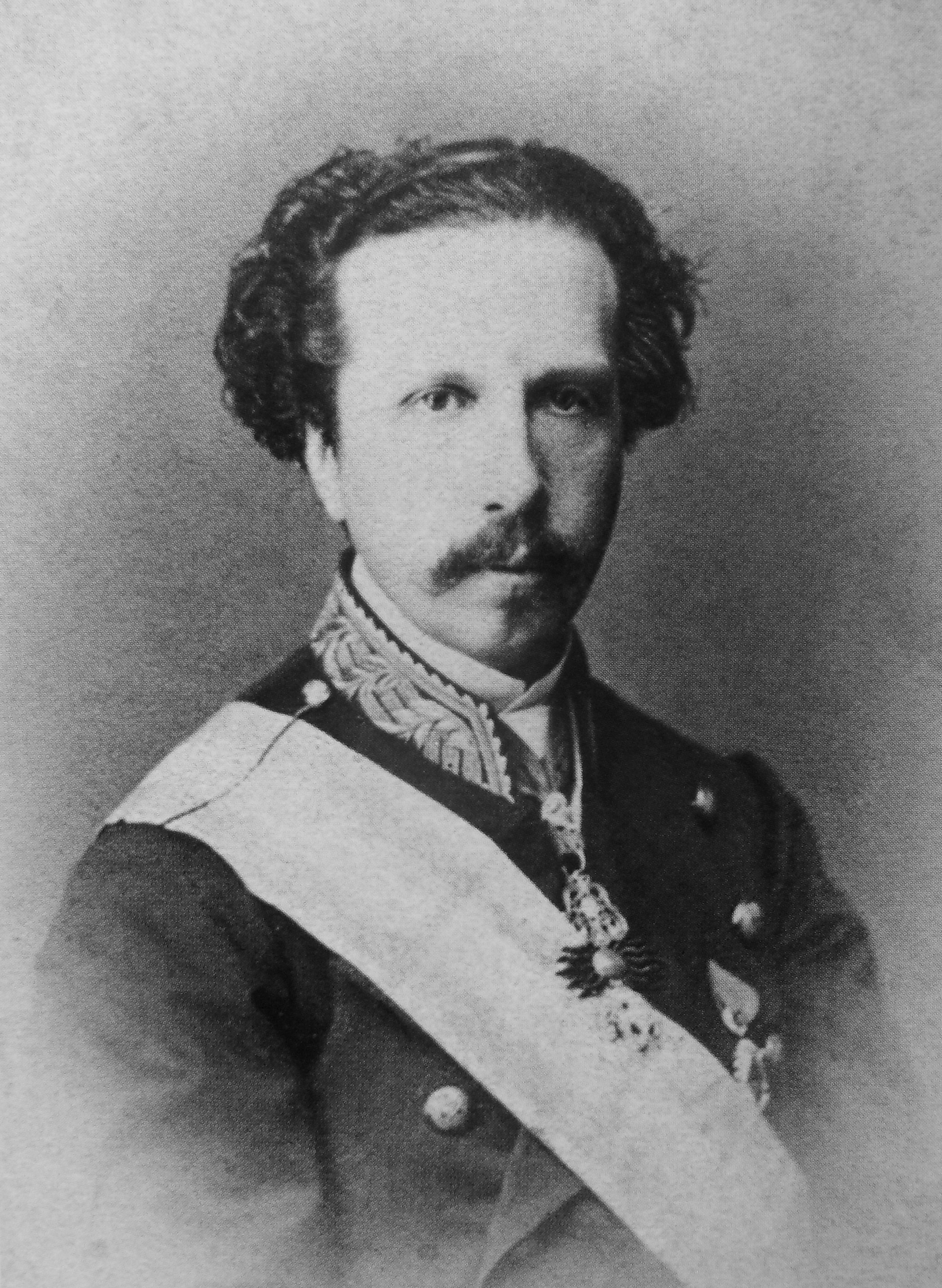
- Photograph by Herbert, c. 1860

King consort of Spain
- Tenure: 10 October 1846 – 30 September 1868
- Born: 13 May 1822; Royal Palace of Aranjuez, Aranjuez, Kingdom of Spain
- Died: 17 April 1902 (aged 79); Épinay-sur-Seine, Paris, French Third Republic
- Burial: El Escorial
- Spouse: Isabella II (m. 1846)
- Issue Among others: Isabel, Princess of Asturias; Alfonso XII; Infanta Pilar; Infanta Paz, Princess Ludwig Ferdinand of Bavaria; Infanta Eulalia, Duchess of Galliera
Names
- Francisco de Asís María Fernando de Borbón y Borbón
- House: Bourbons of Spain
- Father: Infante Francisco de Paula of Spain
- Mother: Princess Luisa Carlotta of the Two Sicilies

Francisco de Asís de Borbón (Francisco de Asís María Fernando; 13 May 1822 – 17 April 1902) was King of Spain as the husband of Queen Isabella II from their marriage in 1846 until Isabella's deposition in 1868. Francisco and his wife were double first cousins, as their fathers were brothers and their mothers were sisters. Isabella was deposed in the Glorious Revolution of 1868, but the monarchy was restored under their son Alfonso XII in 1874.

== Family ==
Francisco de Asís was born at Aranjuez, Spain, the second son (first to survive infancy) of Infante Francisco de Paula of Spain, and of his wife (and niece), Princess Luisa Carlotta of the Two Sicilies. He was named after Saint Francis of Assisi.

== Marriage and children ==
Francisco married Queen Isabella II of Spain, his double first cousin, on 10 October 1846. There is evidence that Isabella would rather have married his younger brother, Infante Enrique, Duke of Seville, and complained bitterly about her husband's effeminate habits after their first night together.

Twelve children were born during the marriage:

1. Infante Luis Fernando of Spain (20 May 1849) stillbirth.
2. Infante Fernando Francisco of Spain (12 July 1850), died five minutes after birth.
3. Infanta María Isabel of Spain (1851–1931): married her mother's and father's first cousin Prince Gaetan, Count of Girgenti.
4. Infanta Maria Cristina of Spain (5 January 1854 – 7 January 1854).
5. Infanta Margarita of Spain (23 September 1855 – 24 September 1855), born prematurely.
6. Infante Francisco de Asis Fernando of Spain (21 December 1856), stillbirth.
7. Alfonso XII of Spain (1857–1885) Future King of Spain.
8. Infanta Maria de la Conception of Spain (1859 – 21 October 1861).
9. Infanta María del Pilar of Spain (1861–1879).
10. Infanta María de la Paz of Spain (1862–1946); married her paternal first cousin Prince Louis Ferdinand of Bavaria.
11. Infanta Eulalia of Spain (1864–1958); married her maternal first cousin Infante Antonio d'Orléans, Duke of Galliera.
12. Infante Francisco de Asis Leopoldo Maria Enrique of Spain (24 January 1866 – 14 February 1866).

There has been considerable speculation that not all, if any, of Isabella's children were fathered by Francisco de Asís; this has been bolstered by rumours that he was either homosexual or impotent. Francisco recognised all of them: however, he acted aggrieved and proceeded to blackmail the queen to receive money in exchange for keeping silent. The extortion by her husband would continue and intensify during Isabella's exile.

== Later life ==
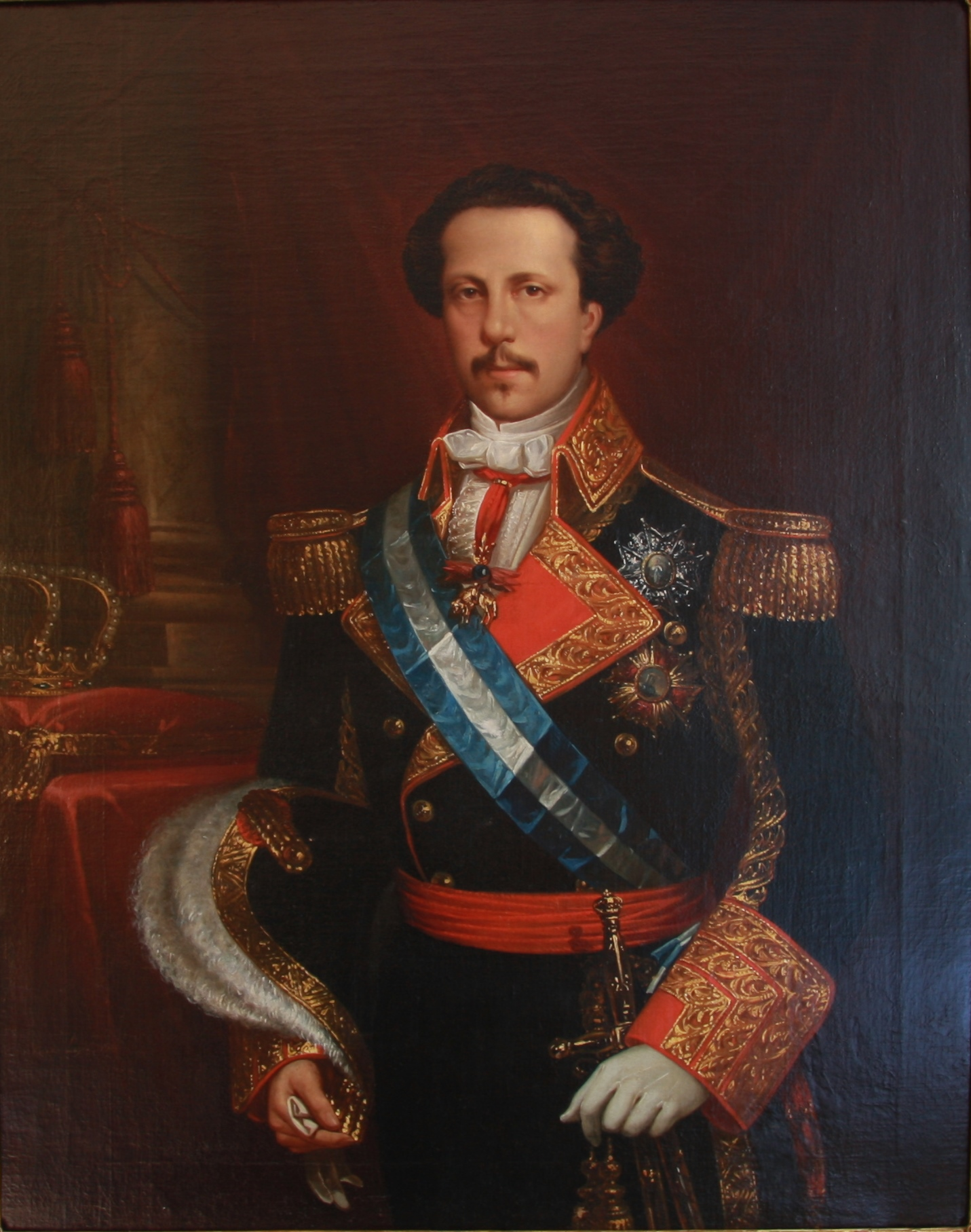
Portrait of King Francisco by Vicente López Portaña

Starting in 1864, Francisco de Asís acted as president of the Spanish Privy Council (Consejo del Reino).

In 1868 Francisco went into exile with his wife in France and adopted the incognito title of Count of Moratalla. On 25 June 1870, Isabella abdicated in favour of their son Alfonso XII—whom the 1874 restoration placed on the throne. By then, Francisco de Asís and Isabella had amicably separated and, with time, became good friends.

In 1881 Francisco de Asís took up residence at the Château of Épinay-sur-Seine (currently the town hall). He died there in 1902. His wife Isabella and two of his daughters, Isabel and Eulalia, were present at his deathbed.

== Honours ==
Coat of arms of King Francisco de Asís

- Spain:
  - Knight of the Golden Fleece, 14 May 1822
  - Grand Cross of the Order of Charles III, 14 May 1822
  - Grand Cross of Isabella the Catholic, 27 January 1824
- Two Sicilies:
  - Knight of St. Januarius
  - Grand Cross of St. Ferdinand and Merit
- Kingdom of Sardinia:
  - Knight of the Annunciation, 6 August 1849
  - Grand Cross of Saints Maurice and Lazarus, 1849
- Duchy of Parma: Senator Grand Cross of the Constantinian Order of St. George, with Collar, 1853
- Kingdom of Bavaria: Knight of St. Hubert, 1852
- Kingdom of Prussia: Knight of the Black Eagle, with Collar, 8 March 1853
- Kingdom of Saxony: Knight of the Rue Crown, 1853
- Monaco: Grand Cross of St. Charles, 7 September 1865
- Sweden-Norway: Knight of the Seraphim, with Collar, 3 May 1853
- Baden:
  - Knight of the House Order of Fidelity, 1866
  - Grand Cross of the Zähringer Lion, 1866
- Württemberg: Grand Cross of the Württemberg Crown, 1866
- Grand Duchy of Hesse: Grand Cross of the Ludwig Order, 4 September 1860
- Kingdom of Hanover:
  - Knight of St. George, 1865
  - Grand Cross of the Royal Guelphic Order
- Austrian Empire: Grand Cross of St. Stephen, 1861
- Denmark: Knight of the Elephant, 21 May 1848
- Kingdom of France: Grand Cross of the Legion of Honour, October 1846
- Netherlands: Knight Grand Cross of the Order of the Netherlands Lion, 7 July 1848
- Belgium: Grand Cordon of the Order of Leopold (military), 12 May 1863

== Ancestry ==
Ancestors of Francisco de Asís, Duke of Cádiz

8. Charles III of Spain
4. Charles IV of Spain (= 14)
9. Maria Amalia of Saxony
2. Infante Francisco de Paula of Spain
10. Philip, Duke of Parma
5. Maria Luisa of Parma (= 15)
11. Louise Élisabeth of France
1. Francisco de Asís, Infante of Spain
12. Ferdinand I of the Two Sicilies
6. Francis I of the Two Sicilies
13. Maria Carolina of Austria
3. Princess Luisa Carlotta of the Two Sicilies
14. Charles IV of Spain (= 4)
7. Maria Isabella of Spain
15. Maria Luisa of Parma (= 5)

== Bibliography ==
Bergamini, John D. The Spanish Bourbons: The History of a Tenacious Dynasty. New York: Putnam, 1974. ISBN 0-399-11365-7

Francisco de Asís, Duke of Cádiz House of Bourbon Cadet branch of the Capetian dynasty Born: 13 May 1822 Died: 17 April 1902
Spanish royalty
Vacant Title last held by Maria Christina of the Two Sicilies as queen consort	King consort of Spain; 10 October 1846 – 30 September 1868	Vacant Bourbon dynasty deposed Title next held by Maria Vittoria dal Pozzo as queen consort
Titles in pretence
Loss of title Spanish Glorious Revolution	— TITULAR — King consort of Spain; 30 September 1868 – 25 June 1870	Vacant Title next held by Mercedes of Orléans as queen consort
