= Infanta María de la Paz of Spain =

Spanish infanta

Infanta María de la Paz
- Princess Ludwig Ferdinand of Bavaria
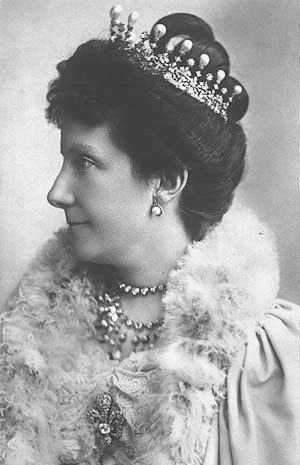
- Infanta Paz in 1907
- Born: 23 June 1862; Madrid, Spain
- Died: 4 December 1946 (aged 84); Nymphenburg Palace, Munich, Bavaria, Germany
- Burial: St. Michael's Church, Munich
- Spouse: Prince Ludwig Ferdinand of Bavaria (m. 1883)
- Issue: Prince Ferdinand; Prince Adalbert; Princess Pilar
Names
- María de la Paz Juana Amelia Adalberta Francisca de Paula Juana Bautista Isabel Francisca de Asís de Borbón y Borbón
- House: Bourbon
- Father: Francisco, Duke of Cádiz
- Mother: Isabella II

Infanta María de la Paz of Spain (23 June 1862, Madrid, Spain – 4 December 1946, Munich, Germany) was a Spanish infanta, daughter of Queen Isabella II. She married her cousin Prince Ludwig Ferdinand of Bavaria and lived the rest of her life in Germany, dedicating her time to her family, charity work and writing poetry. She wrote a book of memoirs: Through Four Revolutions: 1862–1933.

== Early life ==
Born at the Royal Palace of Madrid on 23 June 1862, Infanta Paz was the third surviving daughter of Queen Isabella II and King Francisco. At age sixteen, Isabella was forced to marry Francisco, her double first cousin. The Queen despised her effeminate husband, and found an outlet for her passionate nature with a string of lovers. The relationship between King Francisco and his reputed children was cold and formal. Isabella II, preoccupied with her turbulent reign and her private life, alternated between periods of great affection towards her children and the distant approach to childhood that was the custom of the time.

According to historians, the true biological father of Infanta Paz was the diplomat and politician Miguel Tenorio de Castilla (1818–1916), who was secretary of Queen Isabella II for several years.

Infanta Paz probably also suspected that Tenorio de Castilla was her natural father. In 1890, in his old age, Tenorio de Castilla settled in a suite on the south wing of Nymphenburg Palace, Paz’s residence. He lived there for twenty-six years until his death on 11 December 1916. He bequeathed all his belongings to Infanta Paz, who accepted them as his universal heir.

Infanta Paz was baptized by the archbishop of Toledo with the names María de la Paz Juana Amelia Adalberta Francisca de Paula Juana Bautista Isabel Francisca de Asís. Her godmother was her paternal aunt Infanta Amalia of Spain, Princess of Bavaria. In her first years, Infanta Paz was raised alongside her sisters Infantas Pilar and Eulalia in a wing of the Royal Palace of Madrid. In the formal atmosphere of the Spanish court, the little infantas had little contact with their parents.

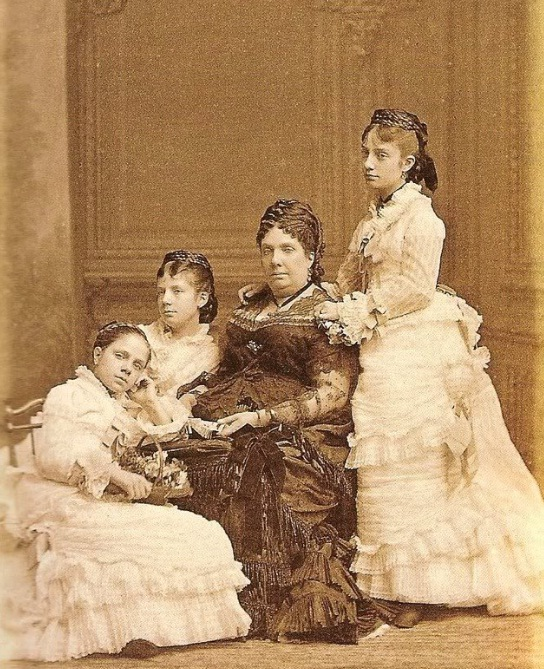
Queen Isabella II with her three youngest daughters: Eulalia, Paz and Pilar.

In 1868, when she was only six years old, Paz and her family were forced to leave Spain by the revolution (the "Glorious Revolution") that cost Queen Isabella II her throne. The royal family was at that time in San Sebastián, and on 30 September 1868, they crossed the border and went to live in exile in France. Isabella II settled in Paris with her children, while King Francisco went to live separately in Épinay. Paz was educated with her sisters Pilar and Eulalia at the Sacré-Coeur, a Catholic school run by nuns. She received her first communion in Rome from Pope Pius IX.

In 1874, Paz’s brother King Alfonso XII was restored to the throne in place of their mother Queen Isabella II. Three years later, Paz returned to Spain with her sisters Pilar and Eulalia. She lived at first in El Escorial with her mother, but later moved to the Alcázar of Seville. When Isabella II returned to live permanently in Paris, Paz and her sisters moved to the Royal Palace of Madrid with their brother King Alfonso XII. The education and care of the three young infantas was placed under the supervision of their eldest sister Infanta Isabel. Paz was particularly close to her sister Pilar, who was only one year older. In 1879, Pilar, who was of delicate health, died suddenly while the sisters were in the small town of Eskoriatza. Paz, who was seventeen at the time, was deeply affected by the death of her sister.

Of Queen Isabella’s five children to survive infancy, Paz was the one who resembled their mother most closely. Paz was short and plain with a small upward nose and a mischievous look in her small eyes. Unlike her sisters Isabel and Eulalia, Paz did not have a strong personality. She was uncomplicated, friendly and accommodating. Romantic and artistic, she was very fond of writing poems and was also a skillful painter. As a child, she studied the history of Spain, and she always remained interested in this subject. In later years, she wrote articles published in the newspaper ABC. She was also musical; she played the harp, and enjoyed songs by Paolo Tosti, as well as the operas of Giuseppe Verdi and Charles Gounod. She was also a devoted Catholic.

== Marriage ==
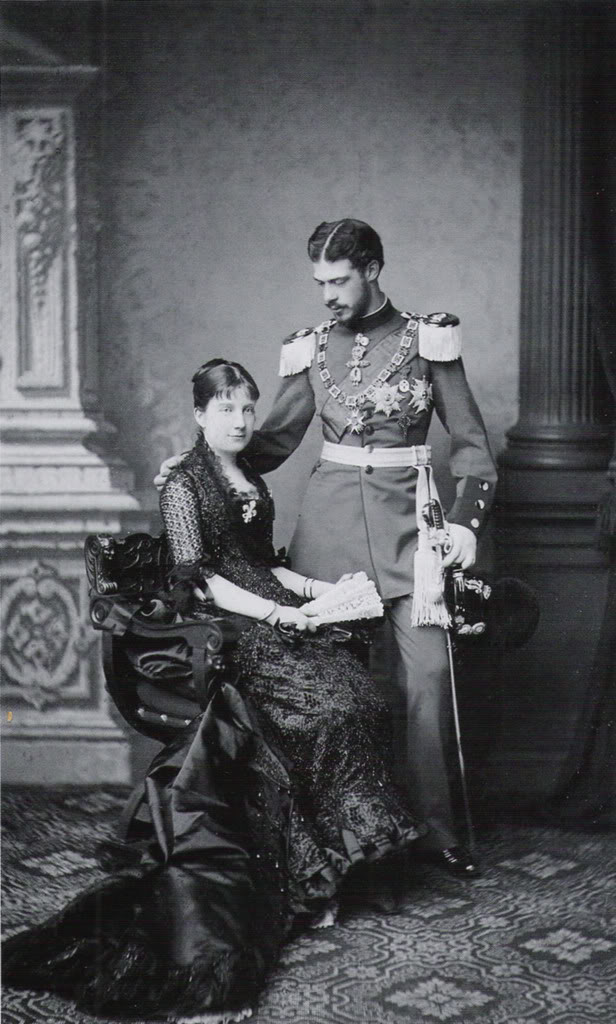
Infanta Paz and Prince Ludwig Ferdinand of Bavaria, 1883

By the spring of 1880, plans were made to marry Infanta Paz to her first cousin Prince Ludwig Ferdinand of Bavaria. Ludwig Ferdinand’s mother was Infanta Amalia of Spain, a sister of Paz’s father King Francisco, and she was also a first cousin of Queen Isabella. Infanta Amalia wanted to marry her son to Infanta Paz, her goddaughter, and with this in mind, she wrote to her brother and her sister-in-law, who agreed to the project.

Alfonso XII, who had briefly studied at the Ludwig-Maximilians-Universität München with his cousin Prince Ludwig Ferdinand of Bavaria, invited him to Madrid in order to meet Paz. On June 5, 1880, Paz wrote on her diary: "Aunt Amalia of Bavaria (widow of Prince Adalbert) is in Paris with her sons Ludwig and Alphonso and her eldest daughter Isabella. Ludwig is eager to meet me, because he liked my portrait. My brother has invited them all to come to Madrid. The two brothers will arrive in the autumn. I have heard many good things about Ludwig. They say he is serious and polite. He probably believes that I am better looking that I really am because of the portrait. I leave everything in God's hands ... "

When Infanta Paz finally met Ludwig Ferdinand in the autumn of 1880, she found him unattractive and did not wish to marry him. Paz rebuffed the proposed marriage, but Ludwig Ferdinand did not abandon his intentions. In January 1883, Ludwig Ferdinand returned to Spain to ask for Paz's hand in marriage. While walking together in the gardens of La casa de campo on January 22, 1883, he proposed and Paz accepted. The marriage took place in the chapel of the Royal Palace of Madrid on 2 April 1883. Paz retained her rights to the Spanish crown and received an annuity of 150,000 pesetas. She was twenty years old. Among her gifts was the Bavarian sunburst tiara, which remained in the princely family until it was sold at auction in 2013.

== Move to Bavaria ==
On their way to Munich, Paz and her husband stopped in Paris and visited King Francisco. who was living in retirement in Épinay. In Bavaria, the couple settled in Nymphenburg Palace outside Munich. Prince Ludwig Ferdinand was not only a cousin of King Ludwig II, but was well liked by him and placed in charge of some the king's financial affairs. In Munich, when Paz met King Ludwig II of Bavaria, they conversed in French, and he gave her a warm welcome. Tragically, Paz's close relationship with the Bavarian ruler ended quickly. King Ludwig II was deposed and died under mysterious circumstances in 1886. He was succeeded by his only brother, Otto, who never truly ruled as king, since he had been declared insane in 1875. Otto's uncle, Prince Luitpold of Bavaria, served as Prince Regent. During the festivities for her arrival at the Bavarian court, Paz met Prince Luitpold, who would serve as Regent of Bavaria until his death in 1912. In Spain, Paz had already met two of Luitpold’s sons: Arnulf and Leopold. The latter was married to Gisela, Archduchess of Austria, daughter of Emperor Francis Joseph; Paz and Gisela became good friends. As with all members of the Bavarian royal family, Paz was related to Luitpold's eldest son Ludwig, who became king of Bavaria in 1913 as Ludwig III. His wife Maria Theresia of Austria-Este was the half-sister of Queen Maria Christina of Spain. Paz also had friends among members of the ducal branch of the Bavarian House of Wittelsbach.

== Children ==
The marriage of Infanta Paz and Prince Ludwig Ferdinand was long and happy. They had three children. The eldest, Prince Ferdinand, followed the tradition of Bavarian-Spanish marriages and lived most of his life in Spain. Paz's youngest children inherited her artistic and literary interests. Prince Adalbert was a writer and historian; Princess Pilar was a painter and wrote a book about the reign of her cousin King Alfonso XIII of Spain. Since her eldest son settled in Spain, Paz made frequent trips to her native country to visit her Spanish grandchildren:

- Infante Ferdinand of Spain, Prince of Bavaria (1884–1958); born in Madrid, he settled permanently in Spain in 1905. He married his cousin Maria Teresa, daughter of Alfonso XII of Spain.
- Prince Adalbert of Bavaria (1886–1970). He was a historian and diplomat. He married Countess Augusta of Seefried and had two sons. They lived in Germany.
- Princess Pilar of Bavaria (1891–1987), unmarried. She worked as a painter.

== Life in Bavaria ==
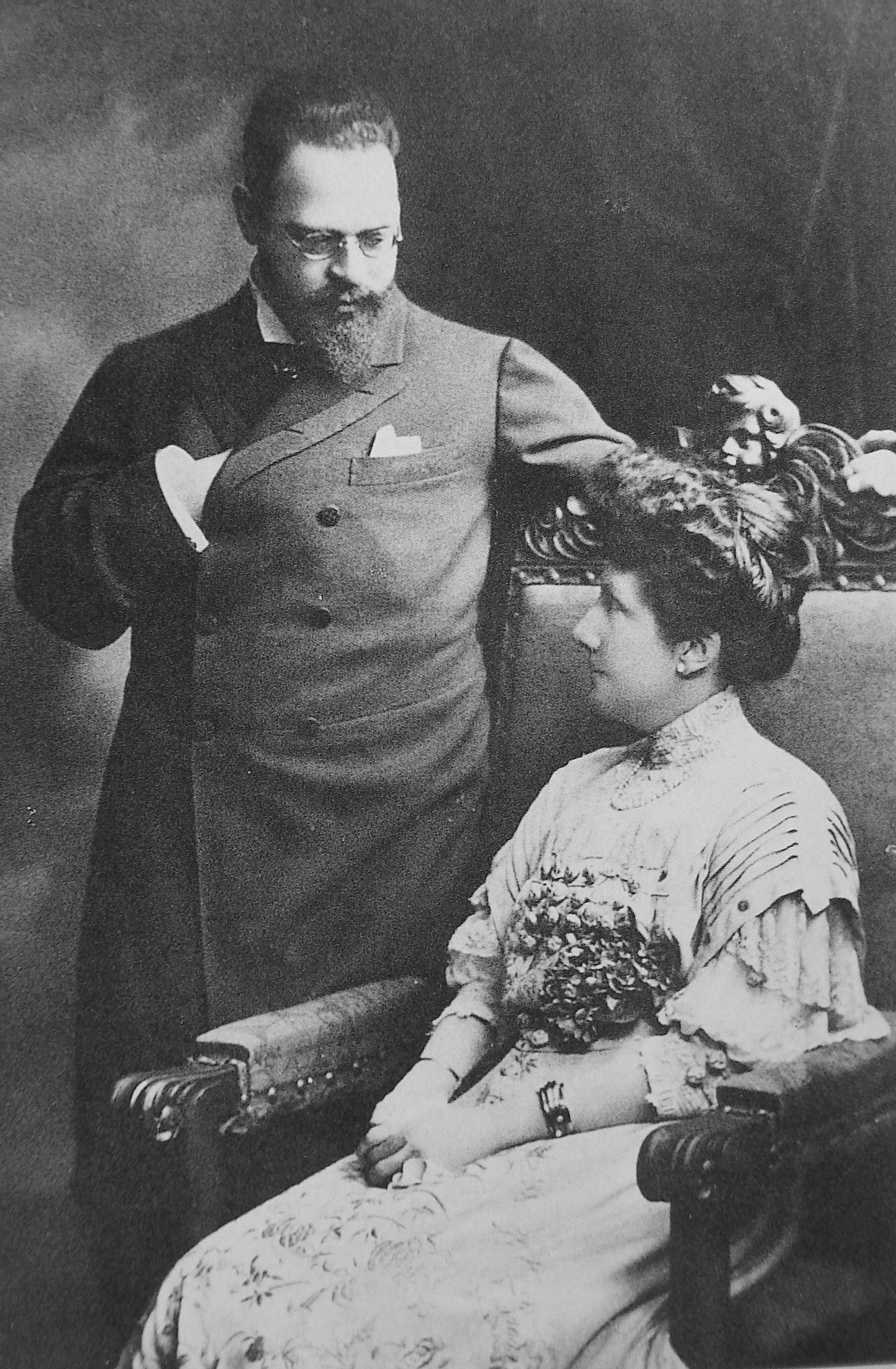
Prince Ludwig Ferdinand of Bavaria and Infanta Paz

Paz's husband Prince Ludwig Ferdinand was a great music lover who played the violin with the Munich royal orchestra. Besides following a military career at the highest ranks, he practiced medicine, which he had studied at the Ludwig-Maximilians-Universität München. He avoided palace intrigues, for he did not like court life; the couple preferred to live quietly with their three children in Nymphenburg Palace. They surrounded themselves with Spanish artists who visited Bavaria: the composer Tomás Bretón, the violist Pablo Sarasate and the painters Eduardo Rosales and José Moreno Carbonero.

In Munich, Paz dedicated a great deal of her time to charity work. She expanded an asylum for poor children in Neuhausen-Nymphenburg, called Marien-Ludwig-Ferdinand. In 1913, she founded a school in Munich within the grounds of Nymphenburg Palace that came to accommodate 38 students who came from different provinces of Spain. This institution was dissolved in 1918 at the time of the German Revolution of 1918-19 that ended the Bavarian monarchy. The Infanta was also in charge of the art exhibit held each year at the Munich Glaspalast until its destruction by fire in 1931. Besides the Spanish cultural figures mentioned above, her house was visited by writers and artist such as the composer Richard Strauss, the painter Franz von Lenbach and the Nobel prize winner Paul Heyse, among others.

From Bavaria, Infanta Paz followed the life of her Spanish family through letters from her sister Isabel. Paz's only brother King Alphonso XII died young in 1886. Paz maintained a warm relationship with her sister-in-law Queen Maria Christina, who was regent of Spain. Later, King Alphonso XIII also acquired great affection for his aunt Paz. Paz's links to her native country were reinforced with the marriage of her eldest son Prince Ferdinand of Bavaria to his first cousin Infanta Maria Teresa. In 1905, her nephew Alphonso XIII visited Paz during his European tour in search of a wife. The following year, Paz and her family went to Madrid and represented Bavaria in the wedding of King Alphonso XIII with Victoria Eugenia of Battenberg. As a wedding present, Paz gave Victoria Eugenia a crown made of gold found in the river Darro that had belonged to Isabella II.

In 1914, Infanta Paz made a journey by car to Salamanca, León, Oviedo, Covadonga and the Cantabrian coast, accompanied by the Marquis de la Vega de Anzo, her sister Infanta Isabel and her daughter Princess Pilar. At the outbreak of World War I in August that year, she stayed in Nymphenburg. Her son Adalbert, who was chief of artillery, joined the German forces. Her sister Eulalia was a frequent visitor, and she was a great help after the devastation caused by World War I

== Last years ==
After the war and the fall of the Bavarian monarchy, Infanta Paz and her family were allowed to keep on living in Nymphenburg Palace. The family fortune was drastically reduced, but Paz still had income as a member of the Spanish royal family. She made sporadic visits to Spain. While in Madrid, she and her husband stayed at the royal palace. Paz also owned a rural property in Cuenca that she had inherited from her grandmother Queen Maria Cristina and the house of the Dukes of Riánsares in Tarancón, where she used to spend long sojourns enjoying the dry fields of La Mancha. Nearby, she bought a rural estate called Saelices that her husband transformed into a model of agricultural farming. It was bought years later by the bullfighter Luis Miguel Dominguín. In October 1928, Paz went to the small town of Santillana del Mar, which she had visited previously in 1881, and the town council gave her a house to spend summers there.

Paz, whose name means "peace" in Spanish, honored her name in observance of pacifism. She took part in pacifist congresses of 1921 in Paris, 1923 in Friburg, 1924 in London, 1926 in Luxembourg and 1926 in Bierville, France.

Following the overthrow of her nephew Alphonso XIII in 1931, Paz lost her Spanish-derived income. Her life in Germany became more restricted with the arrival of Adolf Hitler to power in January 1933. Unlike the main branch of the Bavarian House of Wittelsbach, members of the Albertine branch – to which Paz's family belonged – were not outspokenly opposed to the Nazi regime. Paz's son Adalbert and his two sons Konstantin and Alexander served in the army during World War II until they were forced out when Hitler turned against the German princes. Gestapo officers checked her house; her letters with her Spanish correspondents were opened and read before they were sent on.

In 1945, American troops entered Munich. Soldiers ransacked Paz's house and took with them some jewellery that Paz had inherited from her mother that turned out to be fake.

In 1946, Paz accidentally fell down some stairs and died some hours later. She was buried in the royal crypt in St. Michael's Church in Munich. Her husband survived her by three years.

== Author ==
Infanta Paz wrote the following books:

- Cuatro revoluciones e intermedios: Setenta años de mi vida. Memorias de la Infanta Paz. Espasa-Calpe, Madrid, 1935. Published in English as Through Four Revolutions: 1862–1933.
- Aus meine Leben: Erinnereungen von Prinzessin Ludwig Ferdinand von Bayern (Munich, Georg Muller, 1917)
- De mi vida. Impresiones (Madrid, 1909), De mi vida. Impresiones (Salamanca, 1911)
- Buscando las huellas de Don Quijote (Freiburg, 1905).
- Emmanuela Theresa von Orden St. Clara, tochter des Kurfürsten Max Emanuel von Bayern 1696–1750 (Munich, 1902, published in German and in French ).
- Poesías (Freiburg,1904), Roma eterna (Munich, 1922).

She also translated the historical books written by her son Prince Adalbert from German to Spanish. Paz's personal diary was drawn upon by her son, who in taking some passages from it and adding extracts from her letters to members of her family, published a book with the title Through Four Revolutions: 1862–1933.

== Honours and arms ==
=== Orders and decorations ===
- Spain:
  - Dame of the Order of Queen Maria Luisa, 26 June 1862
  - Grand Cross of the Civil Order of Alfonso XII, 16 January 1914

=== Arms ===
Heraldry of María de la Paz of Spain

Coat of arms of Infanta Paz, Princess in Bavaria (Bavaria)

Coat of Arms of Infanta Paz (as Infanta of Spain)

== Ancestry ==
Ancestors of Infanta María de la Paz of Spain

8. Charles IV of Spain
4. Infante Francisco de Paula of Spain
9. Maria Luisa of Parma
2. Infante Francisco de Asís of Spain
10. Francis I of the Two Sicilies
5. Princess Luisa Carlotta of the Two Sicilies
11. Maria Isabella of Spain
1. Infanta María de la Paz of Spain
12. Charles IV of Spain (= 8)
6. Ferdinand VII of Spain
13. Maria Luisa of Parma (= 9)
3. Isabella II of Spain
14. Francis I of the Two Sicilies (= 10)
7. Maria Christina of the Two Sicilies
15. Maria Isabella of Spain (= 11)

== Bibliography ==
- Aronson, Theo. Venganza real: la Corona de España, 1829–1965. Ed.Grijalbo, 1968.
- Infanta Paz; Cuatro revoluciones e intemedios: Setenta años de mi vida. Espasa-Calpe, Madrid, 1935.
- Infanta Eulalia; Memorias de Doña Eulalia de Borbón, Infanta de España (1864–1931). Ed. Juventud, 1954.
- Baviera, S.A.R. Princesa Pilar de; Chapman-Huston, Comandante Desmond. Alfonso XIII. Col. "Z"
- Puga, Maria Teresa; 20 infantas de España: Sus vidas, entre las ilusiones y el destino. Ed. Juventud, Barcelona, 1998.
- Rey y Cabieses, Amadeo-Martín, Wittelsbach y Borbón: Relaciones y Enlaces Entre las Casas Reales de Baviera y de España, Siglos XIX Al XXI, Consejo Superior de Investigaciones Científicas, 2005
- Vidal Sales, José Antonio; Francisco de Asís de Borbón y Borbón: la peripecia íntima, secreta y sentimental del esposo de Isabel II, un rey consorte afeminado y blando. Ed. Planeta, 1995
