= Prince Ludwig Ferdinand of Bavaria =

Physician and general (1859–1949)

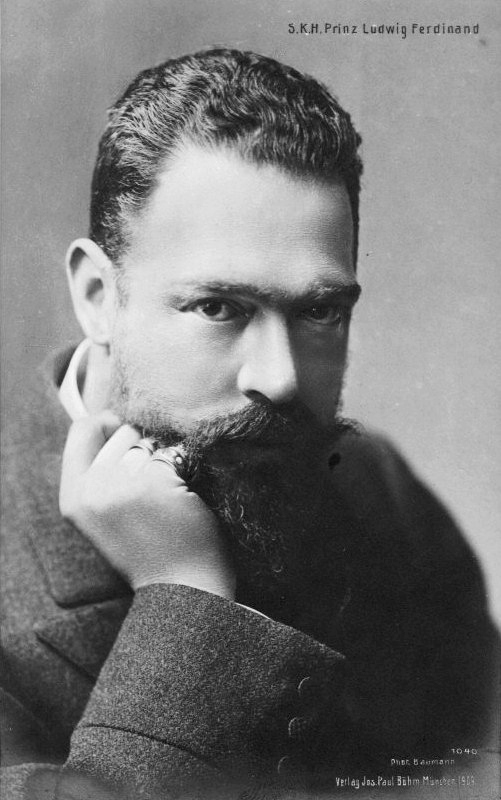
- Prince Ludwig Ferdinand in 1906
- Born: 22 October 1859; Madrid, Spain
- Died: 23 November 1949 (aged 90); Munich, West Germany
- Burial: Michaelskirche, Munich
- Spouse: Infanta María de la Paz of Spain (m. 1883; died 1946)
- Issue: Prince Ferdinand; Prince Adalbert; Princess Pilar
Names
- German: Ludwig Ferdinand Maria Karl Heinrich Adalbert Franz Philipp Andreas Konstantin; Spanish: Luis Fernando María Carlos Enrique Adalberto Francisco Felipe Andrés Constantín
- House: Wittelsbach
- Father: Prince Adalbert of Bavaria
- Mother: Infanta Amalia of Spain

Prince Ludwig Ferdinand Maria Karl Heinrich Adalbert Franz Philipp Andreas Konstantin of Bavaria (22 October 1859 – 23 November 1949) was a member of the Bavarian House of Wittelsbach and a General of Cavalry. Following his marriage to Infanta María de la Paz of Spain, he was also created an Infante of Spain.

== General information ==
He was the eldest son of Prince Adalbert of Bavaria (1828–75) and Infanta Amalia of Spain (1834–1905). He was a paternal grandson of King Ludwig I of Bavaria and his wife Princess Therese of Saxe-Altenburg. His maternal grandparents were Infante Francisco de Paula of Spain and his wife Princess Luisa Carlotta of Bourbon-Two Sicilies.

Ludwig Ferdinand's paternal uncles were King Maximilian II of Bavaria, King Otto I of Greece and Prince Regent Luitpold of Bavaria. His maternal uncle was King-Consort Francis of Spain (1822–1902) and maternally his first cousin was King Alfonso XII of Spain (1857–85), two years his senior. Ludwig Ferdinand was born in Madrid, but his younger siblings in Bavaria, where they had returned.

Ludwig II, Otto I and Ludwig III, Kings of Bavaria, were his first cousins. Alfonso XIII (reigned 1885–1931) was a first cousin's son.

Prince Ludwig Ferdinand was the only member of the Bavarian Royal Family who always remained on friendly terms with his cousin, King Ludwig II (with the exception of Elisabeth, Empress of Austria) – and the only cousin to ever be invited, together with his wife, at Herrenchiemsee Palace as well as for private dinners at the Munich Residence. When Ludwig II was arrested at Neuschwanstein Castle in 1886, he called Ludwig Ferdinand for help; the latter immediately intended to follow this call, but was prevented from leaving Nymphenburg Palace by his uncle Luitpold who was about to take over government as the ruling Prince Regent.

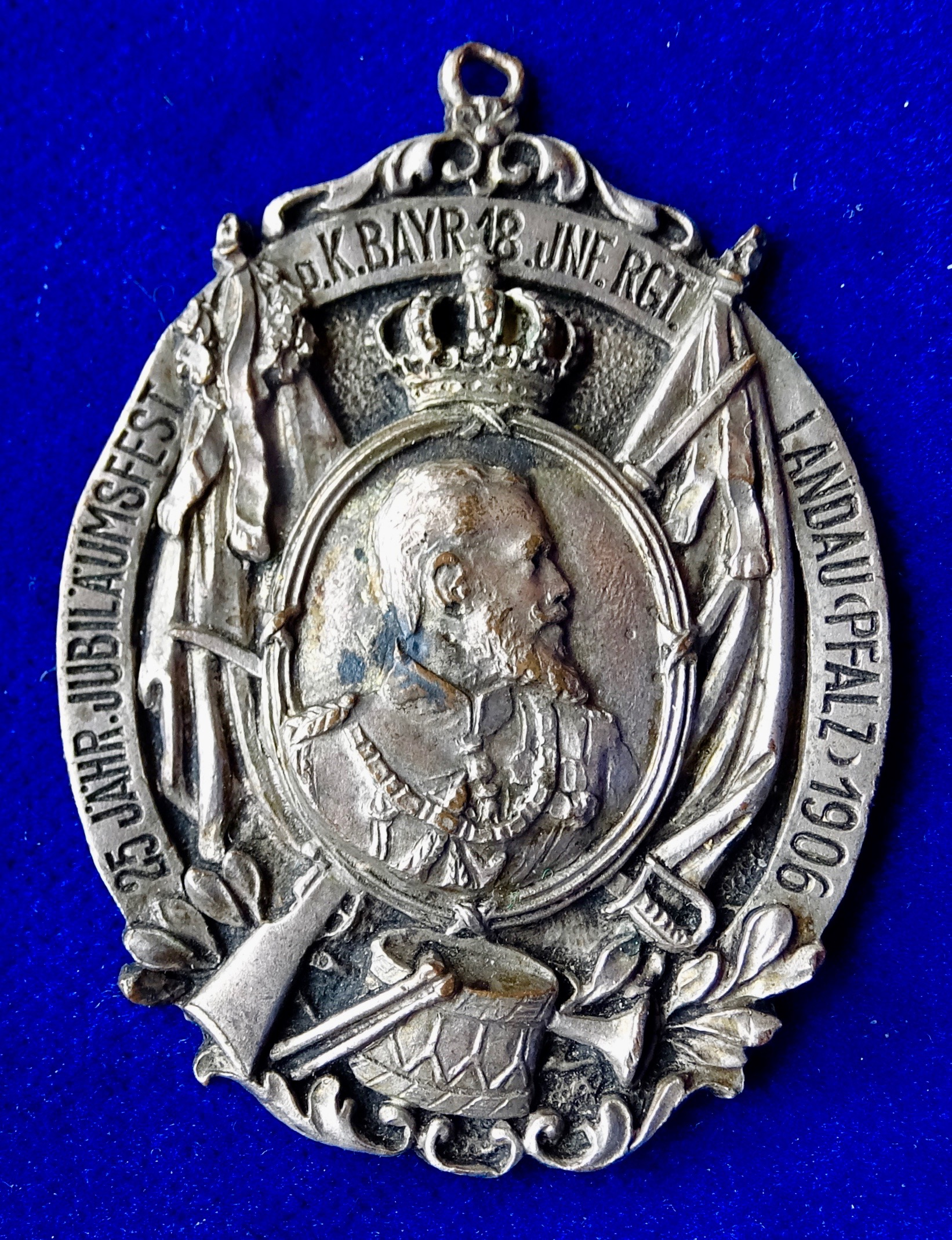
Ludwig Ferdinand, Prinz von Bayern, 1906 medal for the 25th anniversary of his regiment in Landau in der Pfalz.

Ludwig Ferdinand was one of only a few European princes doing an ordinary job outside government or military, by working as a surgeon and gynaecologist.

== Military service ==
Prince Ludwig Ferdinand entered the Royal Bavarian Army on 22 October 1877 as a Sekonde-Lieutenant à la suite of the 2nd Heavy Cavalry Regiment "Archduke Franz Ferdinand of Austria" (Königlich Bayerisches 2. Schwere-Reiter-Regiment „Erzherzog Franz Ferdinand von Österreich-Este“) with a Patent of 11 October 1877. He was promoted to Premier-Lieutenant on 7 February 1880 and to Rittmeister on 20 August 1882.

On 11 May 1883, he was promoted to Oberst (colonel), bypassing the intermediate ranks, and named Inhaber of the Royal Bavarian 18th Infantry Regiment "Prinz Ludwig Ferdinand" (Königlich Bayerisches 18. Infanterie-Regiment „Prinz Ludwig Ferdinand“). He then advanced through the generals' ranks, with a promotion to Generalmajor on 21 November 1887, to Generalleutnant on 11 June 1891 and to General der Kavallerie on 28 December 1898. He received an honorary title as Chief of the Royal Prussian 15th Dragoon Regiment (3rd Silesian) (Königlich Preußisches 3. Schlesisches Dragoner-Regiment Nr. 15) on 5 September 1897.

Due to his medical training, in addition to his regular military titles, he was also placed à la suite of the Royal Bavarian Army's Medical Corps (Sanitätskorps) on 24 October 1910 and named an Obergeneralarzt à la suite of the Sanitätskorps on 16 July 1915. He also held an honorary office (Ehrencharge) as general-inspector of the Royal Spanish Army's Military Medical Corps. During World War I, from 1 November 1916 to 7 November 1918, he served as chief surgeon (Chefarzt) of a military hospital in Munich, the Fürsorge-Reserve-Lazarett München.

== Marriage ==
Prince Ludwig Ferdinand of Bavaria was married in 1883 to his maternal first cousin, Infanta María de la Paz of Spain (1862–1946), the second-youngest daughter of his uncle King Francis and Queen Regnant Isabella II of Spain (reigned from 1833 up to 1868 when deposed, abdicated 1870 and died 1904) and the 845th Dame of the Royal Order of Queen Maria Luisa. The wedding took place in Madrid, during her brother Alfonso XII's reign.

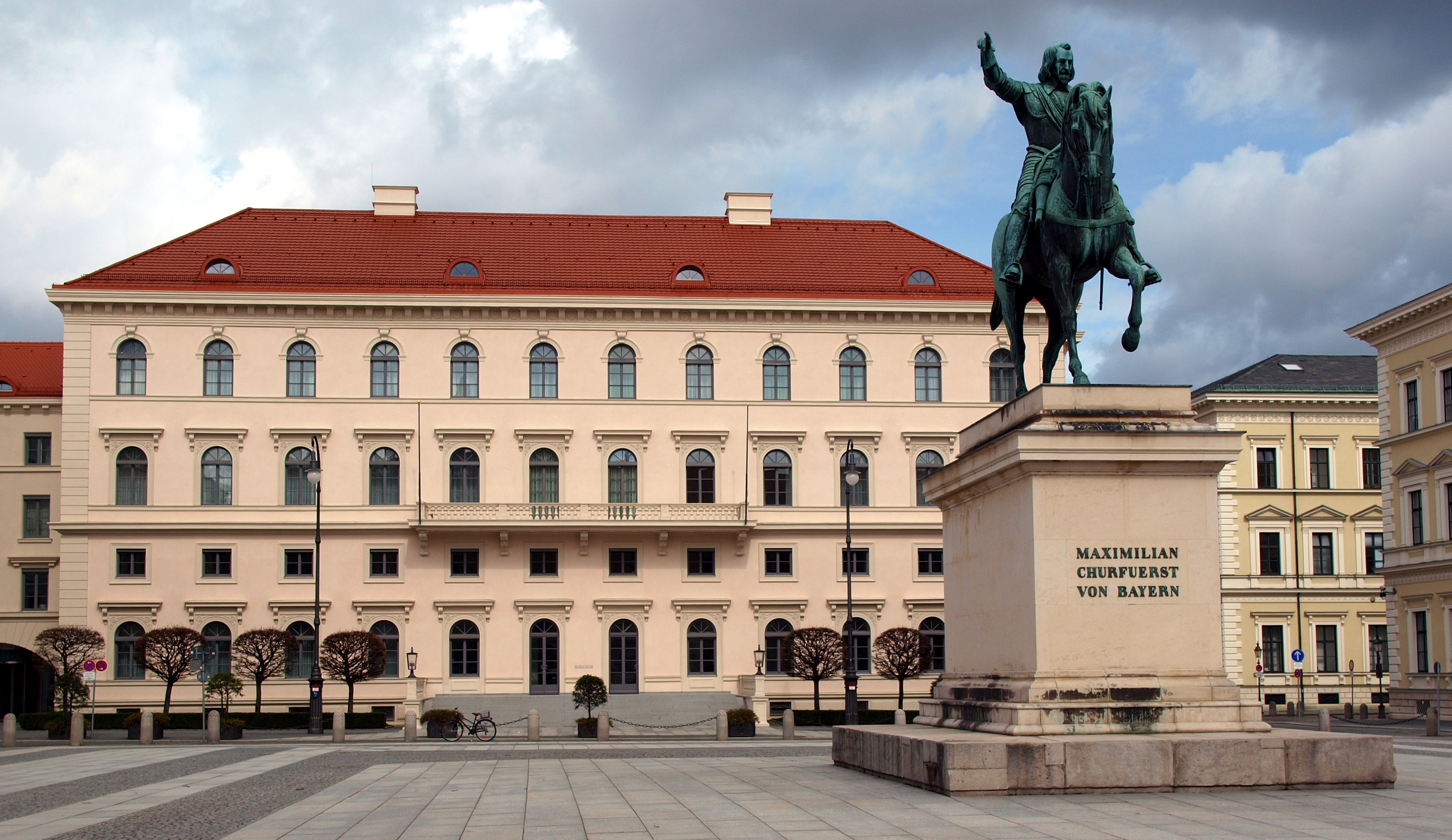
Palais Ludwig Ferdinand, seen from Wittelsbacherplatz

In 1885 the young couple returned to Bavaria and resided chiefly in a side wing of the royal Nymphenburg Palace, left to them by Ludwig II. Later, they occupied an acquired palace in the inner city of Munich, the Palais Ludwig Ferdinand at Wittelsbacherplatz, together with Ludwig Ferdinand's brother Alfons and his family.

Ludwig Ferdinand and María de la Paz established the so-called Spanish branch of the Bavarian royal family, started with Ludwig Ferdinand's parents' marriage but strengthened by successive Spanish marriages in altogether three generations.

== Children ==
They had the following children:

- Prince Ferdinand of Bavaria, Prince of Bavaria (1884–1958), born in Madrid and settled permanently in Spain in 1905, married Infanta Maria Teresa of Spain
- Prince Adalbert of Bavaria (1886–1970). Married Countess Augusta von Seefried auf Buttenheim and had two sons; lived in Germany.
- Princess Pilar of Bavaria (1891–1987), unmarried.

Ferdinand died in Francoist Spain, in Madrid.

Ludwig Ferdinand's sisters were Isabella, Duchess of Genoa; Elvira, Countess von Wrbna-Kaunitz-Rietberg-Questenberg und Freudenthal; and Clara, Abbess of St. Anna; and his younger brother was Prince Alphonse of Bavaria, husband of Louise of Orléans, daughter of Ferdinand, Duke of Alençon and Duchess Sophie in Bavaria. Alphonse's son Prince Joseph Clemens of Bavaria lived 1902–90 and died childless and unmarried. A daughter, Elisabeth, became Countess von Kageneck.

== Honours and awards ==
Prince Ludwig Ferdinand received the following orders and decorations:

=== German states ===
- Kingdom of Bavaria:
  - Order of Saint Hubert (22 October 1877)
  - Honorary Royal Order of Saint George for the Defense of the Immaculate Conception, Grand Prior (1880)
  - St. George Medal
  - Military Merit Order, Grand Cross with Swords (1 March 1918)
  - King Ludwig Cross (7 January 1916)
  - Jubilee Medal for the Bavarian Army (12 March 1905)
  - Service Decoration Cross, 2nd Class (for 25 years' service)
- Grand Duchy of Baden: House Order of Fidelity (1908) (30 July 1908)
- Grand Duchy of Hesse: Ludewig Order, Grand Cross (21 November 1893 / 2 December 1893)
- Hohenzollern principalities: Princely House Order of Hohenzollern, Honor Cross 1st Class (21 January 1915)
- Grand Duchy of Mecklenburg-Schwerin: House Order of the Wendish Crown, Grand Cross with Crown in Ore (7 January 1911)
- Kingdom of Prussia:
  - Order of the Black Eagle (26 December 1893) with Collar (17 January 1894)
  - Iron Cross 2nd Class (9 November 1916)
  - Red Cross Medal 1st Class (9 October 1916)
- Kingdom of Saxony: Order of the Rue Crown (25 September 1897)
- Grand Duchy of Saxe-Weimar-Eisenach:
  - Order of the White Falcon, Grand Cross (16 October 1892)
  - Jubilee Medal (18 October 1892)
- (Saxe-Coburg and Gotha) (Duchy of Saxe-Altenburg) (Saxe-Meiningen) Saxon duchies: Ducal Saxe-Ernestine House Order, Grand Cross (5 December 1897)
- Kingdom of Württemberg: Order of the Württemberg Crown, Grand Cross (26 March 1914)

=== Foreign states ===
- Austria-Hungary: Decoration for Services to the Red Cross, 1st Class with War Decoration (9 October 1916)
- Italy and Italian States:
  - Kingdom of Italy: Supreme Order of the Most Holy Annunciation (13 April 1883)
  - Grand Duchy of Tuscany: Order of Saint Joseph, Grand Cross
- Ottoman Empire:
  - Liakat Medal in Gold with Sabers (9 October 1916)
  - War Medal (9 October 1916)
- Kingdom of Romania: Order of the Star of Romania, Grand Cross (6 October 1900)
- Spain:
  - Order of the Golden Fleece (19 April 1883)
  - Order of Santiago (19 April 1883)
  - Order of Charles III, Knight Grand Cross (18 November 1886) with Collar (30 May 1906 / 16 June 1906)
  - Insignia of the Noble Knightly Association of Saragossa (20 January 1885)
  - Civil Order of Alfonso XII, Grand Cross (1 March 1904)
  - Medal of the Regency (1 March 1904)
  - Insignia of the Noble Knightly Association of Madrid (23 November 1910)
  - Jubilee Medal of 1809 (23 November 1910)

== Ancestry ==
Ancestors of Prince Ludwig Ferdinand of Bavaria

8. Maximilian I Joseph of Bavaria
4. Ludwig I of Bavaria
9. Princess Augusta Wilhelmine of Hesse-Darmstadt
2. Prince Adalbert of Bavaria
10. Frederick, Duke of Saxe-Altenburg
5. Princess Therese of Saxe-Hildburghausen
11. Duchess Charlotte Georgine of Mecklenburg-Strelitz
1. Prince Ludwig Ferdinand of Bavaria
12. Charles IV of Spain
6. Infante Francisco de Paula of Spain
13. Princess Maria Luisa of Parma
3. Infanta Amalia of Spain
14. Francis I of the Two Sicilies
7. Princess Luisa Carlotta of the Two Sicilies
15. Infanta Maria Isabella of Spain
