= List of the dames of the Order of Queen Maria Luisa =

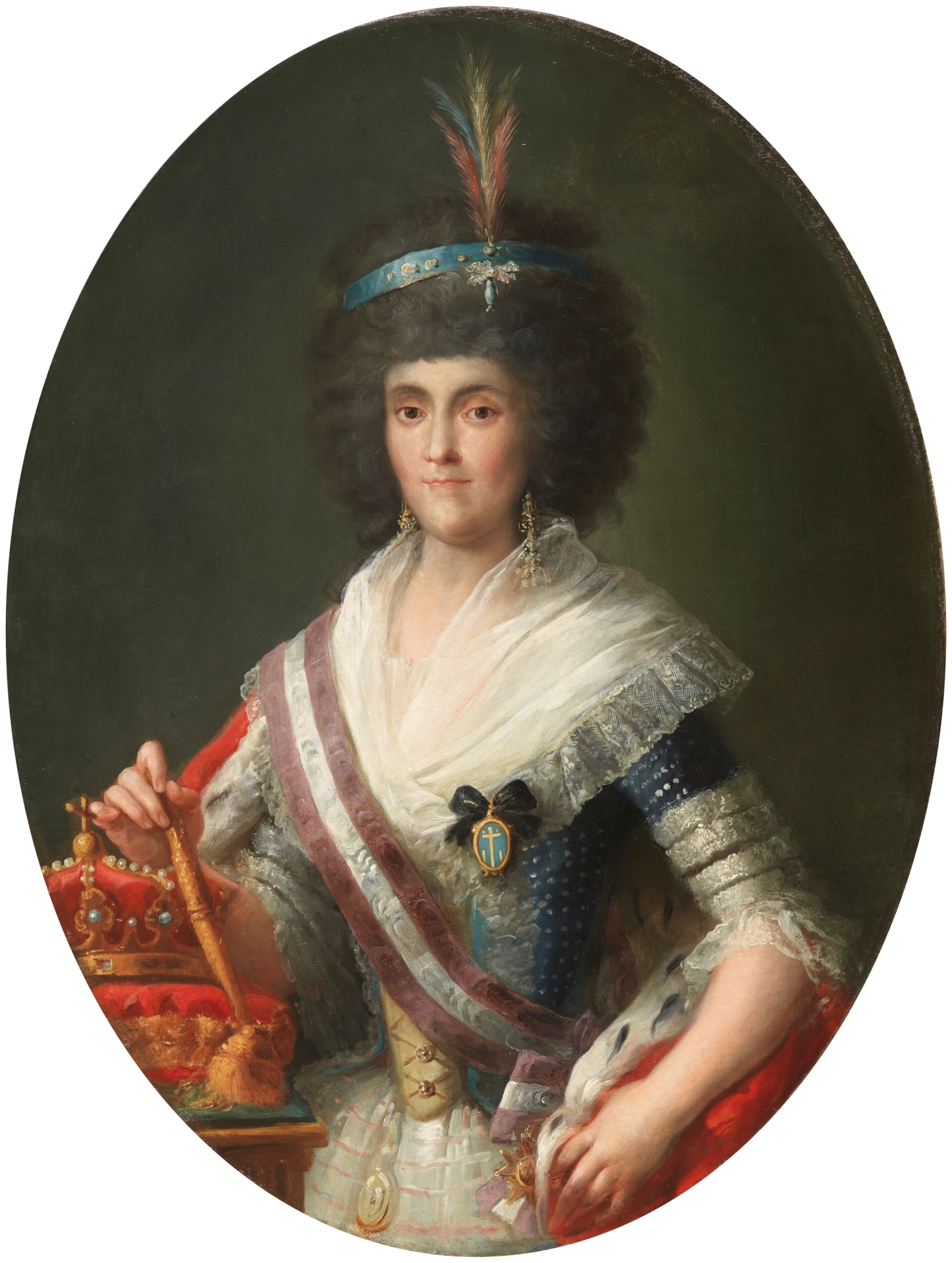
Queen María Luisa

Ladies who have belonged throughout history to the Order of the Noble Ladies of Queen Maria Luisa are listed here. Currently and under the statutes in effect a single category is preserved, "Noble Lady", and the number remains limited to 30 holders, unless exceeded by the express will of the king. After Infante Juan of Spain, Count of Barcelona resigned his dynastic rights on 14 May 1977, during the reigns of Juan Carlos I and Felipe VI no appointments have been made to the order. Although it formally remains in force, it can be considered that this order is dormant.

Infanta María Josefa

Queen Carlota Joaquina of Portugal

Infanta María Amalia (1779–†1798)

The Queen Etruria and Duchess of Lucca

Queen Maria Cristina of Sadinia

María Antonia, Princess of Asturias

Queen Maria Isabel

Queen Maria Josepha

Infanta Luisa Carlotta

Queen Maria Christina

Empress Maria Feodorovna

Empress Elizabeth Alexeievna

Empress Caroline Augusta

Duchess Maria Teresa of Parma

Queen María Cristina of the Two Sicilies

The Dauphine and Duchess of Angoulême

Queen Marie of Denmark and Norway

Empress Alejandra Fiódorovna

Queen Louise of Belgium

Empress Maria Anna of Austria

Infanta María Amalia (1818–†1857)

Infanta Isabel Fernanda

Empress Maria Leopoldina of Brazil

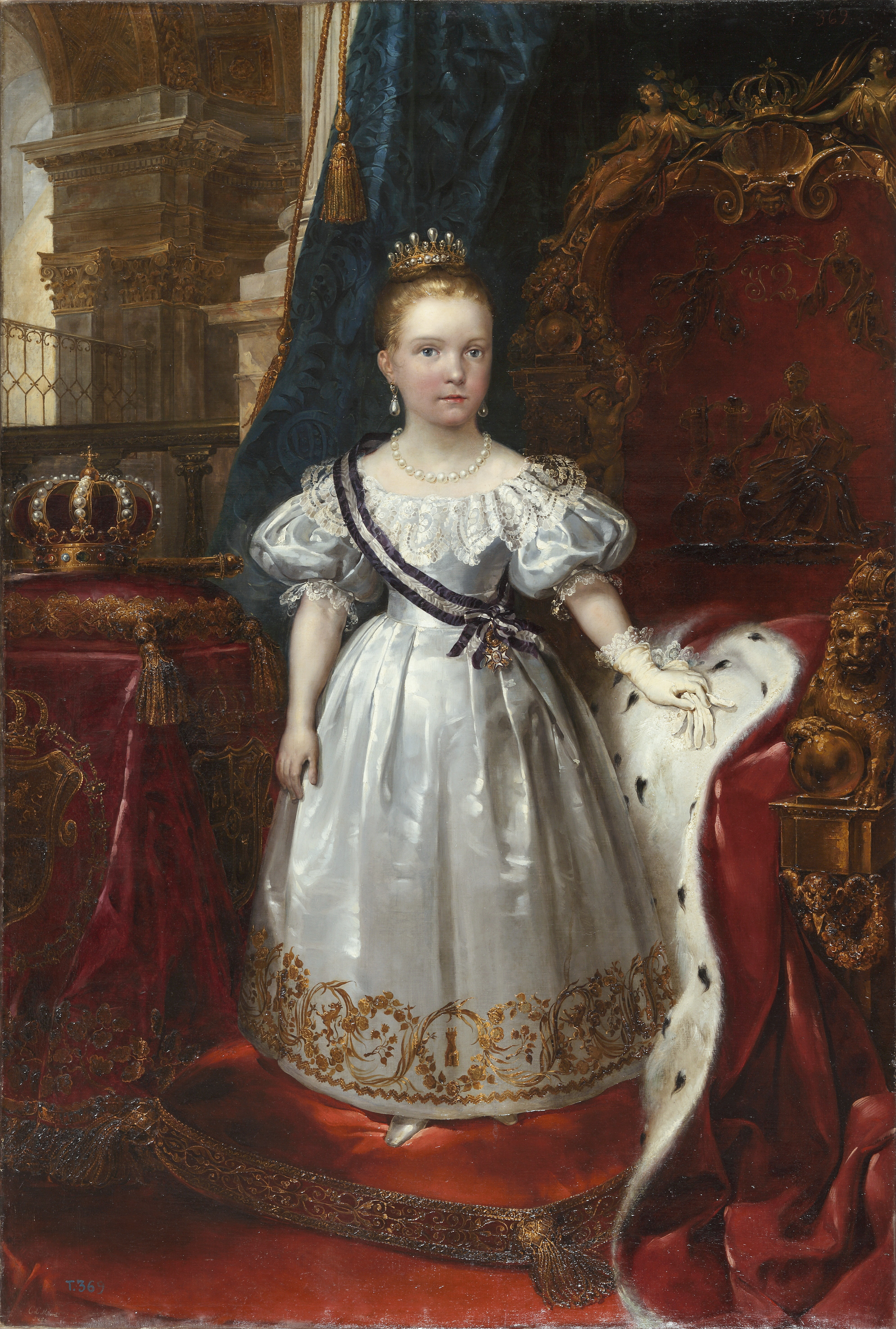
Isabella II

Infanta Luisa Fernanda

Infanta María Cristina (1833–†1902)

Empress Amélia of Brazil

Princess Maria Amélia of Brazil

Queen Victoria of the UK, Empress of India

Maria II of Portugal

Queen Marie Amélie of the French

Helene, Royal Princess of the French

Queen Caroline of Denmark

Queen Anna of the Netherlands

Empress Teresa Cristina Empress of Brazil

Queen Maria Theresa, Queen of the Two Sicilies

Queen Marie of Bavaria

Queen Sophie of the Netherlands

Queen Sophie of the Two Sicilies

Empress Eugénie of the French

Isabel, Princess Imperial of Brazil

Queen Amalie Auguste of Saxony

Leopoldina, Princess of Saxe-Coburg and Gotha

Queen Marie Henriette of Belgium

Empress Augusta of Germany

Queen Louise of Sweden

Empress Maria Alexandrovna

Empress Carlota of Mexico

Empress Elisabeth of Austria, Queen of Hungary

Queen Maria Pia of Portugal

Queen Olga of Greece

Queen Louise of Denmark

Infanta Isabella

Empress Shōken

Queen Sophia of Sweden

Infanta Pilar (1861–†1879)

Infanta Paz

Archduchess Gisela of Austria

Infanta Eulalia

The Countess of Caserta

Queen Mercedes

Queen Maria Christina

Queen Carola of Saxony

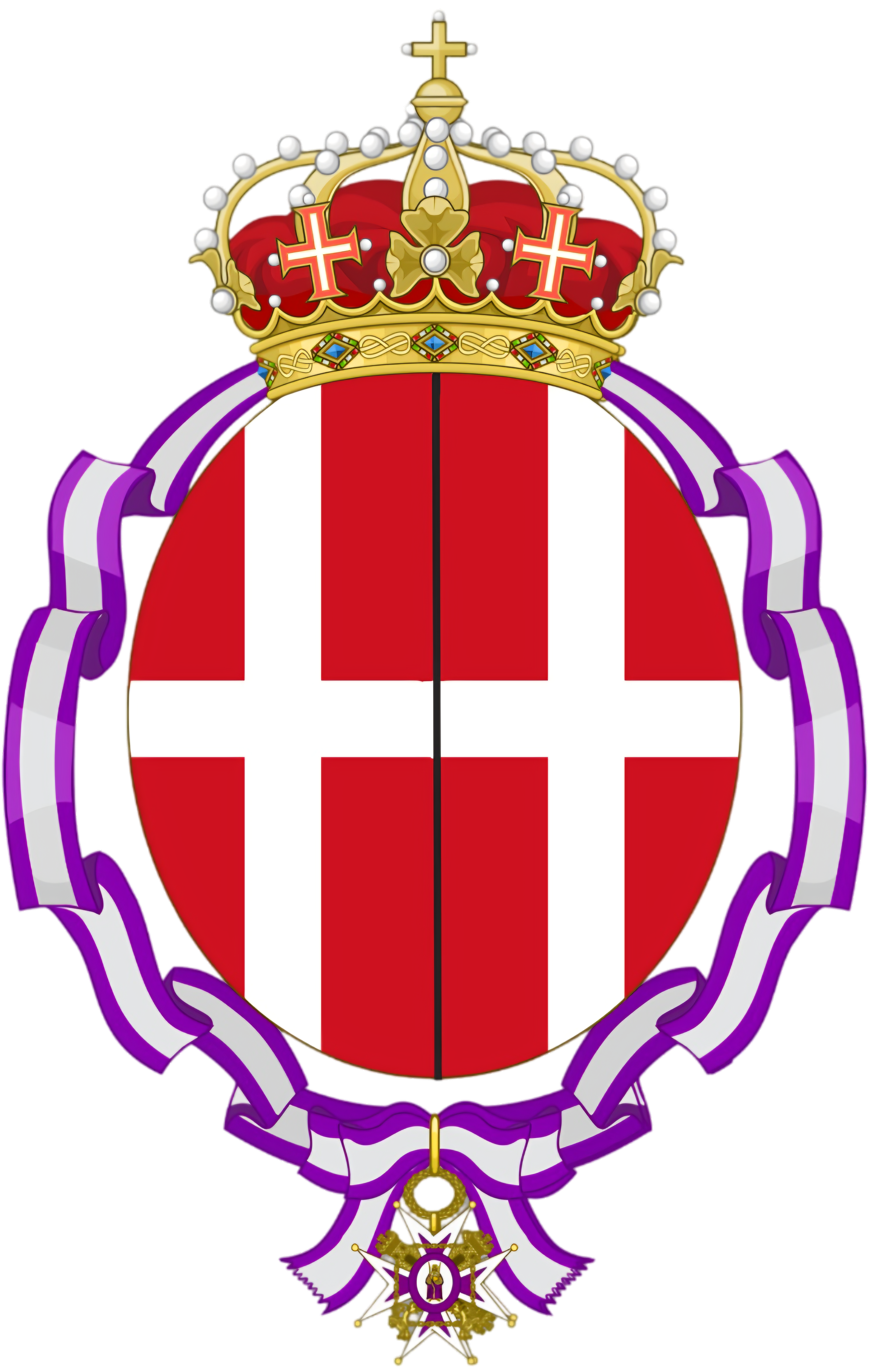
Queen Margherita of Italy

The Countess of Flanders

Empress Victoria of Germany

Queen Emma of the Netherlands

Mercedes, Princess of Asturias

Infanta Maria Teresa (1882–†1912)

Empress Maria Feodorovna

Queen Elisabeth of Romania

Empress Augusta Victoria of Germany

Queen Amélia of Portugal

Princess Beatrice of the UK

Queen Alexandra of the UK, Empress of India

Queen Wilhelmina of the Netherlands

Grand Duchess Maria Pavlovna of Russia

Empress Alexandra Feodorovna

Louise, Crown Princess of Saxony

The Duchess of Guisa

Queen Elena of Italy

Hélène, Duchess of Aosta

Princess of Metternich-Winneburg

Cecilie, Crown Princess of Germany

Archduchess Maria Josepha of Austria

Louise, Queen of Denmark

Queen Victoria Eugenie

Louise, Princess Alfonso of Bavaria

The Duchess of Connaught and Strathearn

Queen Victoria of Sweden

Empress Teimei

Elisabeth, Queen of Belgium

The Marchioness of Carisbrooke

The Princess Andrew of Greece and Denmark

Anne Hélène, Duchess of Apulia

Queen Alexandrine of Denmark

Queen Sophia of Greece

Queen Maria Theresa of Bavaria

Archduchess Maria Annunciata of Austria

Queen Marie of Romania

Josefa Bouquet de Figueroa

The Duchess of Galliera

Infanta Luisa

The Duchess of Talavera

The Countess of Harewood

The Duchess of Brunswick

Grand Duchess Victoria Feodorovna

The Countess of Pardo Bazán

Infanta Beatriz Infanta Maria Cristina

The Duchess of Valentinois

The Countess of Barcelona

Esperanza, Imperial Princess of Brazil

Infanta Isabel Alfonsa

Infanta Dolores

The Duchess of la Victoria

Infanta Mercedes (1911–†1953)

Concha Espina

María de las Mercedes Miralles de Villegas (Chile)

Princess Takamatsu

Infanta Alicia

The Duchess of Anjou and Segovia

Infanta Pilar Infanta Margarita

Queen Sofia

== Grand mistresses ==
- 1792-1816: 1st Grand Mistress and 1st Dame Grand Cross. Queen María Luisa (wife of King Charles IV), née Princess Maria Luisa of Parma
- 1816-1818: 2nd Grand Mistress and 101st Dame. Queen Maria Isabel (2nd wife of King Ferdinand VII), née Infanta Maria Isabel of Portugal
- 1819-1829: 3rd Grand Mistress and 180th Dame. Queen Maria Josepha (3rd wife of King Ferdinand VII), née Princess Maria Josepha Amalia of Saxony
- 1829-1833: 4th Grand Mistress and 222nd Dame. Queen María Cristina (4th wife of King Ferdinand VII), née Princess Maria Christina of the Two Sicilies
- 1833-1870: 5th Sovereign and 250th Dame Grand Cross. Queen Isabella II of Spain
- 1878: 6th Grand Mistress and 562nd Dame. Queen Maria de las Mercedes (Alfonso XII's wife), née Princess Maria de las Mercedes of Orléans y Bórbon
- 1879-1906: 7th Grand Mistress and 805th Dame Grand Cross. Queen María Cristina (wife of King Alfonso XII), née Archduchess Maria Christina of Austria-Teschen
- 1906-1941: 8th Grand Mistress and 976th Dame Grand Cross. Queen Victoria Eugenie (wife of King Alfonso XIII), née Princess Victoria Eugenie of Battenberg
- 1941-1977: Titular Grand Mistress and 1,171st Dame Grand Cross. Infanta María Mercedes, Countess of Barcelona (wife of Infante Juan, Count of Barcelona), née Princess María de las Mercedes of Bourbon-Two Sicilies
- 1977-2014: 9th Grand Mistress and 1193rd Dame. Queen Sofía of Spain (wife of King Juan Carlos I of Spain), née Princess Sophia of Greece and Denmark
- From 2014: 10th de facto Grand Mistress. Queen Letizia (wife of King Felipe VI) - There has been no new appointments after Queen Sofía so that this order can be considered as dormant.

== Order of María Luisa between 1792 and 1808 ==
- 1. Queen María Luisa of Spain (Charles IV's wife), née Princess Luisa Maria of Parma
- 2. Queen Carlota Joaquina of Portugal (John VI's wife), née infanta Carlota Joaquina of Spain, daughter of Queen María Luisa
- 3. Infanta María Amalia of Spain, daughter of Queen María Luisa
- 4. Queen María Luisa of Etruria (Louis's wife), née Infanta Maria Luisa of Spain, (daughter of Queen María Luisa)
- 5. Queen María Isabella of the Two-Sicilies (Francis I's wife), née Infanta María Isabella of Spain, daughter of Queen María Luisa)
- 6. Infanta Maria Theresa of Spain (1791-1794), daughter of Queen María Luisa.
- 7. Infanta Maria Josefa of Spain, sister of King Charles IV
- 8. Duchess Maria Amalia of Parma (née Archduchess Maria Amalia of Austria), Consort of Ferdinand, Duke of Parma
- 9. Princess Carolina of Saxony (née Princess Carolina of Parma), daughter of the former
- 10. Princess Maria Antonia of Parma, daughter of Duchess Maria Amalia
- 11. Princess Maria Carlotta of Parma, daughter of Duchess Maria Amalia
- 12. Florentina Pizarro y Herrera, 12th countess of La Gomera
- 13. Laura María Castellví Cervellón y Mercader, 5th countess of Cervellón, marchioness of Villatorcaz
- 14. María Faustina Téllez Girón y Pérez de Guzmán
- 15. María de La Portería Fernández de Velasco, 8th Countess of Peñaranda
- 16. Isabel María Pío, 7th Marchioness of Castel-Rodrigo
- 17. María Isidra Manrique de la Cerda y Guzmán, 19th duchess of Nájera, 22nd countess of Valencia de Don Juan
- 18. María Teresa Ignacia Fernández de Córdova y Pacheco, 8th countess of Baños
- 19. María de la Concepción Belvís de Moncada y Pizarro
- 20. María de la Encarnación Álvarez de Toledo y Gonzaga
- 21. María Antonia Godoy y Álvarez de Faria, marchioness of Branciforte
- 22. Marie Joseph Julie du Chasteler de Moulbaix
- 23. María del Pilar de Silva Fernández de Híjar
- 24. María Agustina Adorno y Sotomayor
- 25. Josefa Joaquina de Olazábal y Murguía
- 26. María Josefa Rebolledo de Palafox y Bermúdez de Castro
- 27. María Luisa Centurión y Velasco, 8th marchioness of Estepa
- 28. María Vicenta Pacheco y Téllez-Girón
- 29. Ana María Fernández de Córdova Figueroa y Moncada
- 30. Joaquina de Benavides y Pacheco, 3rd duchess of Santisteban del Puerto
- 31. María de las Angustias Fernández de Córdova y Pacheco
- 32. María Joaquina de los Desamparados de Montserrat y Acuña
- 33. María Josefa Pimentel y Téllez-Girón, duchess consort of Osuna
- 34. María Teresa del Pilar de Olivares y Cepeda, 2nd marchioness of Villacastel de Carrias
- 35. María Ana de Palafox y Silva
- 36. Princesa Carolina Augusta zu Stolberg-Gedern, Duchess consort of Liria and Jérica
- 37. María de la Concépción Teresa Fernández de Córdoba y Sarmiento
- 38. María Ana de Abad y Albret-Bearne, 21st viscountess of Bearne
- 39. Francisca de Paula de Benavides y Fernández de Córdova
- 40. María Luisa de Silva y González de Castejón, 15th countess of Cifuentes
- 41. María Antonia Fernández de Córdoba y Sarmiento de Sotomayor
- 42. María Teresa de Silva Fernández de Híjar y Palafox
- 43. María Fernanda Fitz-James-Stuart y Stolberg-Gedern
- 44. Isabel María Parreño Arce y Valdés
- 45. Francisca María Dávila y Carrillo de Albornoz, countess of Truillas
- 46. María Cayetana de Galarza y Brizuela, 3rd countess of la Oliva del Gaytán, 5th countess of Fuenrubia
- 47. Francisca María Bejarano del Águila, marchioness of Sofraga
- 48. Ana María de Contreras y Vargas Machuca, 6th countess of Alcudia
- 49. María Antonia Teijeiro de Valcárcel y Puixmarín, marchioness of Albudeyte
- 50. María de la Portería de Benavides y Pacheco
- 51. Cayetana María de la Cerda y Carnesio-Odescalchi
- 52. María Cayetana de la Cerda y Vera
- 53. Eusebia María Tello y Riaño, countess of Villariezo
- 54. María de los Dolores de Vera y Saurín
- 55. María Antonia Cattaneo della Volta
- 56. María Josefa Ramírez de Arellano y Olivares, 7th countess of Murillo
- 57. María del Rosario de Silva Cebrián y Fernández de Miranda, 6th countess of Fuenclara
- 58. María del Carmen Pacheco Tellez-Girón Fernández de Velasco
- 59. Francisca de Borja Alfonso de Sousa de Portugal y Sousa de Portugal, 9th marchioness of Guadalcázar
- 60. María Antonia Justa Álvarez de Faria y Sánchez-Sarzosa
- 61. Ana Joaquina de Bustamante y Hoyos
- 62. Francisca Ramírez de Laredo y Encalada
- 63. María Pascuala Everardo-Tilly y Panés, 2nd marchioness of Casa Tilly
- 64. María de la Cabeza Fonseca y Castro
- 65. Rafaela Josefa Ortiz de Rozas y Ruiz de Briviesca
- 66. María Jerónima Daoiz y Guendica
- 67. María Lutgarda de Hevia y Navarro, marchioness of la Victoria
- 68. Juana María Muñoz Jofre de Loaísa y Salcedo
- 69. Francisca Javiera López Altamirano
- 70. Inés María de Aguirre y Yoldi
- 71. María Caro y Ortiz
- 72. Constanza Falconieri, princess of Rocca Sinibalda
- 73. María Ignacia Álvarez de Toledo y Gonzaga
- 74. María del Buen Consejo de Carvajal y Gutiérrez de los Ríos
- 75. Ana de Llamas y Mena
- 76. Juana María de Pereyra y Alderete
- 77. Isabel de Bongars y Martínez
- 78. Brígida de Lalaing Calasanz y Abarca
- 79. María Francisca de Sales Portocarrero de Guzmán y Zúñiga, 10th marchioness of La Algaba
- 80. María del Pilar Fernández de Miranda y Villacís
- 81. María Donata de Samaniego y Pizarro, V viscountess of la Armería
- 82. María Fernanda O'Connock y Magenis
- 83. Petra de Quiñones Álamos y Miranda
- 84. Ana Anguisola Pallavicini
- 85. Aurelia Canossa Arriani
- 86. Juana Antonia Bucarelli y Baeza, 4th marchioness of Vallehermoso, countess of Gerena
- 87. Ramona de Godoy y Álvarez de Faria
- 88. Juana de Regis de Armendáriz
- 89. Princess Amalie of Saxony, daughter of Princess Carolina of Saxony, 9th Dame
- 90. Grand-duchess Maria Ferdinanda of Tuscany (Ferdinand III's wife), née Princess Maria Ferdinanda of Saxony,
- 91. María Antonia Sanz-Merino y Muñoz
- 92. Paula Melzi de Eril
- 93. María del Pilar de la Cerda y Marín de Resende
- 94. María Águeda de Torres y Quiens
- 95. Ana Tarrasconi Pallavicini
- 96. Maria Teresa de Borbón, princess of la Paz (sister of María Luisa, granddaughter of Felipe V))
- 97. la duchess of Sueca (daughter of María Teresa)
- 98. María Luisa de Borbón y Vallabriga, duchess of San Fernando de Quiroga (sister of María Teresa, granddaughter of Felipe V))
- 99. María Teresa de Vallabriga y Rozas, countess consort of Chinchón (mother of the former, daughter-in-law of Felipe V)

== 1808-1962 ==
- 100. Infanta Maria Teresa of Portugal, Princess of Beira
- 101. Queen Maria Isabel of Spain (Ferdinand VII's 2nd wife), née infanta Maria Isabel of Portugal
- 102. Infanta Maria Francisca of Portugal, Infanta Carlos of Spain, Countess consort of Molina (Carlist pretension)
- 103. Infanta Isabel Maria of Portugal, regent of Portugal
- 104. Queen Maria Carolina of Naples and Sicily (Ferdinand I's wife), née archduchess Maria Carolina of Austria
- 105. Princess Marie-Caroline de Bourbon-Sicile, duchess de Berry
- 106. Queen Maria Cristina of Sardinia (Charles Felix's wife), née princess Maria Cristina of Naples and Sicily
- 107. Queen Marie Amélie of the French (Louis Philippe I's wife), née princess Maria Amalia of Naples and Sicily
- 108. Princess Maria Antonia of Naples and Sicily, princess consort of Asturias (Ferdinand VII of Spain's 1st wife)
- 109. Maria Luisa di Tocco Cantelmo Stuart, duchess consort de San Teodoro
- 110. María Joaquina de Lalaing y de la Cerda
- 111. María Ana Nin de Zatrillas y Sotomayor, 6th duchess of Sotomayor
- 112. Maria de Pau van Marck de Lummen, baroness consort of San Luis
- 113. Joaquina Josefa de Oca y Navia Lagarde-Salignac
- 114. María Aurora Pérez de Guzmán y Gutiérrez de los Ríos
- 115. Teresa Josefa de Salazar y Morales, countess of Montarco
- 116. Teresa de Godoy Pizarro y Carvajal, 10th countess of Torrejón
- 117. Josefa Crespí de Valldura y Aguilera, marchioness of Peñafuente
- 118. María de las Mercedes de Rojas y Tello, 4th marchioness of Villanueva del Duero
- 119. María Francisca de Cañas y Portocarrero, 7th duchess del Parque
- 120. Eduarda Manuela Montaner y Ramírez de Arellano
- 121. María Magdalena Pelliza y Echverría
- 122. Princess Maria Luisa Carlota of Parma, Crown Princess Maximilian of Saxony
- 123. Ludovica Altieri, princess consort of Forano
- 124. Maria Maddalena Pitti, countess Arrigheti
- 125. Antonia Peccore, countess Peccore
- 126. María Josefa de Contreras y Vargas Machuca, 7th countess of Alcudia, marchioness of Campofuerte
- 127. María Rosa de las Casas y Aragorrí
- 128. María de la Candelaria de San Juan y Felíu de la Peña
- 129. Joaquina Bernuy y Valda
- 130. Lorenza de Guzmán y Castilla, 4th marchioness of San Bartolomé del Monte
- 131. María Ramona de Palafox y Portocarrero
- 132. Pascuala de Valda y Maldonado
- 133. Grand-duchess Maria Anna of Tuscany (Leopold I's wife), née Princess Maria Anna of Saxony,
- 134. Maria Henriette Anna Elisabeth Rosalia, countess of Colloredo-Mannsfeld
- 135. Joséphine de Beauharnais, Empress of the French
- 136. Queen Caroline of Naples and Sicily, née princess Caroline Bonaparte
- 137. Anna Maria Granieri Manca
- 138. Giustina Borromeo Arese d'Angera, princess consort di Palestrina
- 139. Amalia Charlotte, princess Barberini-Colonna
- 140. Infanta Maria da Assunção of Portugal
- 141. Infanta Ana de Jesus Maria of Portugal, Marchioness of Loulé
- 142. Princess Benedicta de Brazil, Infanta Benedita of Portugal
- 143. María Magdalena Fernández de Córdoba y Ponce de León
- 144. Gabriella Maria Ignazia Asinari dei marchesi di San Marzano
- 145. Francisca de Almeida Portugal
- 146. María Josefa de Gálvez y Valenzuela, 2nd marchioness of la Sonora
- 147. María Rafaela Centurión y Vera
- 148. María Francisca Vera de Aragón y Manuel de Villena, marchioness of Espinardo
- 149. María Escolástica Gutiérrez de los Ríos y Sarmiento de Sotomayor
- 150. María del Pilar Gayoso de los Cobos y Bermúdez de Castro
- 151. Maria do Resgate de Noronha
- 152. Francisca Correia de Lacerda Melo Pita Pacheco, 13th dame of Favelães
- 153. Juliana Xavier Botelho, marchioness of Lumiares
- 154. Margarida Xavier Botelho de Lancastre, 1st marchioness of São Miguel
- 155. María del Carmen Álvarez de Faria y Pelliza, 1st marchioness of Gracia Real
- 156. María Luisa Isabel de Borbón y Braganza (1817-1818), infanta of Spain
- 157. María del Carmen Josefa López de Zúñiga y Chaves, 15th countess of Miranda del Castañar, 10th duchess of Peñaranda de Duero
- 158. María de los Dolores Villanueva y Pérez de Barradas
- 159. María de la Asunción Belvís de Moncada y Rojas, countess of Villamarciel, 5th marchioness of Villanueva del Duero, Grande de España, 7th countess of Villariezo y de Villaverde
- 160. María del Carmen de Aguayo y Aguayo, 4th countess of Villaverde la Alta
- 161. María Ana de Witte y Pau
- 162. Josefa de Herrera y Berrío
- 163. María de la Concepción Castaños y Aragorri
- 164. Catalina de Sierra y Sierra
- 165. María Luisa de Navia y Güemes
- 166. Narcisa Asprer y de la Canal
- 167. Empress Elisabeth Alexeievna of Russia (Alexander I's wife) princess Louise of Baden
- 168. Empress Sophie Dorothea of Russia (Paul I's wife) née duchess Sophie Dorothea of Württemberg
- 169. Empress Maria Leopoldina of Brazil (Pedro I's 1st wife), née archduchess Maria Leopoldina of Austria
- 170. Empress Caroline Augusta of Austria (Francis I's wife), née princess Caroline Augusta of Bavaria
- 171. Orsola Bourbon del Monte dei conti di Mealla
- 172. Archduchess Clementina of Austria, princess Leopold of Two Sicilies, princess of Salerno
- 173. Lucia Migliaccio duchess of Floridia, 2nd morganatic wife of King Ferdinand I of the Two Sicilies
- 174. Mariana Griffeo Migliacio
- 175. Infanta Luisa Carlota of Spain, née Princess Princess Luisa Carlotta of Naples and Sicily, wife of Infante Francisco de Paula of Spain
- 176. Queen Amalie of Saxony (Frederick Augustus I's wife) née countess palatine Amalie of Zweibrücken-Birkenfeld
- 177. Princess Maria Anna of Saxony, daughter of Frederick Christian, Elector of Saxony
- 178. Princess Maria Augusta of Saxony, daughter of Queen Amalie, 176th Dame
- 179. Princess Maria Kunigunde of Saxony, princess-abbess of Essen and Thorn (daughter of Augustus III of Poland)
- 180. Queen Maria Josepha of Spain (Ferdinand VII's 3rd wife), née princess Maria Josepha Amalia of Saxony
- 181. Queen Maria Theresa of Saxony (Anthony's wife), née archduchess Maria Theresa of Austria
- 182. countess of La Tour-Maubourg
- 183. María de las Mercedes Belvís de Moncada y Pizarro
- 184. María de los Dolores Diega Ramírez de Arellano y Olivares, 3rd marchioness of Villacastel de Carrias
- 185. María Josefa de Salcedo Cañaveral y Cañas, marchioness of Vallecerrato, 8th duchess del Parque
- 186. Luisa Joaquina Escrivá de Romaní y de Taberner
- 187. María Francisca Álvarez de Bohorques y Pérez de Barradas
- 188. María Antonia de Salazar y Álvarez de Toledo
- 189. Juana Jerónima Valcárcel y Alfaro, 6th countess of Balazote
- 190. María de Guadalupe de Moncada y Berrio, 1st marchioness of San Román
- 191. Bruna Gutiérrez de los Ríos y Sarmiento de Sotomayor
- 192. María Rosa Gastón de Iriarte y Navarrete
- 193. María de las Angustias de Orozco y Bernuy
- 194. Maria Felisa Alliata
- 195. Maria Theresa of Austria-Este, Queen of Sardinia née princess of Modena
- 196. Duchess Maria Teresa of Parma (Charles II's wife), née Princess Maria Teresa of Savoy
- 197. Empress Maria Anna of Austria (Ferdinand I's wife), née princess Maria Anna of Savoy
- 198. Queen Maria Cristina of Two-Sicilies (Ferdinand II's 1st wife), née princess Maria Cristina of Savoy
- 199. Infanta Isabel Fernanda of Spain, countess Gurowska, daughter of Infante Francisco de Paula of Spain
- 200. Maria do Carmo Xavier Botelho de Portugal
- 201. María Teresa Federica de Sousa Holstein
- 202. Archduchess Marie Caroline of Austria, Crown Princess of Saxony
- 203. Queen Amalie Auguste of Saxony (John's wife), née princess Amalie Auguste of Bavaria
- 204. Marie Thérèse of France, Madame Royale, duchess of Angoulême
- 205. Antónia Basília Herédia de Bettencourt
- 206. Duchess Louise of Parma (Charles III's wife), née Louise Marie Thérèse of Artois, princess of France
- 207. María de los Dolores de Araoz y Arredondo
- 208. María Antonia de Witte y Rodríguez de Alburquerque
- 209. Julia, princesa Tatischeff
- 210. Augustine Frédérique Joséphine du Bouchet de Sourches de Tourzel
- 211. Louise de Rosiéres-Sorans
- 212. Beatrice d'Amblimont, marchioness of Delage
- 213. Isabel Antónia do Carmo de Roxas e Lemos Carvalho e Menezes
- 214. María del Carmen Bernuy y Aguayo
- 215. Infanta Luisa Teresa of Spain, duchess of Sessa, daughter of Infante Francisco de Paula of Spain
- 216. Catherine Noele Verlée
- 217. María Manuela Vera de Aragón y Nin
- 218. María Eulalia de Queralt y Silva
- 219. Mariana Lombardo, marchioness consort of Montemaggiore
- 220. Ana María Riccio, princess consort of Pandolfina
- 221. María de la Soledad Visitación Pacheco y Benavides
- 222. Queen María Cristina of Spain (Ferdinand VII's 4th wife), née princess Maria Christina of the Two Sicilies
- 223. Grand Duchess Maria Antonia of Tuscany (Leopold II's wife) née Princess Maria Antonia of the Two Sicilies
- 224. Princess Maria Amalia of Bourbon-Two Sicilies, Infanta Sebastian of Portugal and Spain
- 225. Empress Alexandra Feodorovna of Russia (Nicholas I's wife), née princess Charlotte of Prussia
- 226. Marie-Caroline de La Forest
- 227. Infanta Josefina Fernanda of Spain, daughter of Infante Francisco de Paula of Spain
- 228. María Luisa de Carvajal y de Queralt
- 229. María Eulalia de Carvajal y de Queralt
- 230. Juliana Luisa Maria de Oyenhausen de Almeida, countess of Oyenhausen-Graven
- 231. Emma Brochowsk
- 232. Joaquina Josefa de Carvajal y Manrique de Lara
- 233. Infanta María Teresa (1828-1829), daughter of Infante Francisco de Paula of Spain
- 234. Agata Gravina, princesa di Palagonia e di Lercara
- 235. Bernarda Manso de Velasco y Chaves
- 236. María Josefa García de la Peña y Torres
- 237. Gabriela Caballero y Rebollo
- 238. María Bernarda Ortiz de Guinea y Terán
- 239. María de la Encarnación Josefa Ponce de León y Carvajal
- 240. María Amalia de Cron y de Witte
- 241. Giovanna Ruffo dei duchi di Bagnara
- 242. Condesa di San Martino
- 243. Vittoria d'Aquino
- 244. Stefania Moncada, princess consort of Cassero e di Sabuci
- 245. María Josefa Gayoso de los Cobos y Téllez Girón, marchioness of Camarasa
- 246. Princess Maria Carolina of Bourbon-Two Sicilies, Infanta Carlos of Spain, Countess consort of Montemolin
- 247. Empress Teresa Cristina of Brazil (Pedro II's wife), née princess Teresa Cristina of the Two Sicilies
- 248. Ekaterina Mijailovna Potemkina, countess consort of Ribeaupierre
- 249. Auguste Charlotte Louise de Riquet de Caraman, duchess consort de Almazán de Saint Priest
- 250. Queen Isabella II of Spain
- 251. Francisca Pignatelli Cortés y Aragón
- 252. Joaquina Téllez Girón y Pimentel
- 253. Ramona Pardo de Figueroa Lanzós de Novoa
- 254. María del Rosario de Zayas Rejón y Arias de Saavedra, countess consort of Atarés
- 255. Francisca de Paula Taboada de Mendoza y López
- 256. Manuela Sagarra de Manuel de Villena
- 257. María Tomasa Palafox y Portocarrero, duchess consort of Medina Sidonia
- 258. María de la Asunción Dorotea Guillermina La Boine de Berghe
- 259. María Vicenta de la Cerda y Palafox
- 260. María Francisca Núñez del Castillo y Montalvo
- 261. Agustina de Mendizábal e Irisarri
- 262. María Teresa Josefa de Ugarte y Risel
- 263. Luisa Felicidad Correa de Sotomayor
- 264. María Francisca de la Cabeza de Cascajares y Muñoz Serrano
- 265. María de los Dolores Pacheco y Gómez de Barreda
- 266. Ana Agapita de Valda y Teijeiro de Valcárcel
- 267. María Manuela Monserrat y Ester
- 268. Carlota La Grúa y Godoy
- 269. Victorine-Josephe Auriol
- 270. Infanta Luisa Fernanda, duchess of Montpensier, sister of Isabella II
- 271. Juana Ortiz de Rozas e Ibáñez de la Bárcena
- 272. Julia Gaetani, princesa Gaetani
- 273. Infanta María Cristina of Spain
- 274. María del Pilar de Pando y Fernández de Pinedo
- 275. María Juliana Mollinedo y Cáceres
- 276. María Antonia de Anduaga y Siles
- 277. María Joaquina de Miranda y Sebastián
- 278. María del Carmen Gragera y Topete
- 279. María de la Concepción Ponce de León y Carvajal
- 280. Rosalia Ventimiglia y Moncada, duchess consort de Alba de Tormes (princesa Ventimiglia di Grammonte)
- 281. María de la Trinidad Wall y Manrique de Lara
- 282. Carlota Luisa de Güemes y Muñoz de Loaysa
- 283. María de la Encarnación Álvarez de Bohorques y Chacón
- 284. María de los Dolores de Santisteban y Horcasitas
- 285. Inés Francisca de Silva y Téllez Girón
- 286. María del Pilar Gayoso de los Cobos y Téllez Girón
- 287. Mary de Bode-Kynnerlsey
- 288. Queen Victoria of the United Kingdom.
- 289. María Teresa Fraga de Requena y Grases
- 290. Queen Caroline Amalie of Denmark and Norway (Christian VIII's wife), née princess Caroline Amalie of Schleswig-Holstein-Sonderburg-Augustenburg
- 291. María de la Concepción de la Vega y Rodríguez del Toro, countess consort of Torre Pando
- 292. Queen Marie of Denmark and Norway (Frederick VI of Denmark's wife) née princess and landgravine Marie of Hesse-Kassel
- 293. María Vicenta Moñino y Pontejos
- 294. Queen Maria II of Portugal
- 295. Empress Amélie of Brazil (Pedro I's wife), née princess Amélie of Leuchtenberg (mother of Princess Maria Amélia of Brazil, 333rd Dame)
- 296. Infanta Amelia Philippina of Spain, Princess Princess Adalbert of Bavaria
  (sister-in-law of Queen Isabella II, 250th Dame and mother of Princess Clara Eugenie of Bavaria, 1109th Dame)
- 297. Isabel María Roca de Togores y Valcárcel
- 298. Queen Louise Marie of the Belgians (Leopold I's wife), née princess Louise of Orléans, Princess of France
- 299. Eugénia Francisca Xavier Teles da Gama
- 300. María dos Prazeres Giráo de Sousa e Melo
- 301. María Magdalena Osés de Córdoba y Villahermosa
- 302. María Jacinta Martínez de Sicilia y Santa Cruz
- 303. Luisa María Fernández de Córdova y Álvarez de Bohorques
- 304. Manuela de Carvajal y Téllez-Girón
- 305. Juana María de la Vega y Martínez
- 306. Alejandra de Wlodeck y Lagarde-Salignac
- 307. Duchess Helene of Mecklenburg-Schwerin, Princess Ferdinand Philippe of France, Duchess of Orleans, sister-in-law of Queen Louise Marie, 298th Dame.
- 308. María de Caño Santo de Cepeda y Nonet
- 309. María Rosa de Alburquerque, wife of Manuel de Cañas-Trujillo y Sánchez de Madrid, Minister of Marine, Trade and Overseas Ultramar
- 310. Marie-Louise Thomas de Pange
- 311. María de las Angustias Fernández de Córdova y Pacheco
- 312. Lady Elizabeth Frances Villiers, viscountess consort Ponsonby de Imokilly
- 313. María de la Candelaria Saavedra y Ramírez de Baquedano, 11th countess of Sevilla la Nueva
- 314. Luisa Carlota Sáenz de Viniegra y Velasco
- 315. Eusebia de Zafra Vázquez y Pérez del Cid
- 316. María Ramona Ozores y Valderrama
- 317. María de la Fuencisla de Artacho y Chaves
- 318. Louise-Cordélia Greffulhe
- 319. Eulalie Elise Dosne
- 320. María Luisa Ferrándiz Bendicho y Luzzi
- 321. María del Carmen Chacón y Carrillo de Albornoz
- 322. María Felipa de Carondelet y Castaños
- 323. María Magdalena Tecla Caballero y Terreros (Married to Don Diego Isidro De Guzman De La Cerda)
- 324. Fernanda María de Silva y Téllez-Girón
- 325. Joaquina de Loaysa y Topete
- 326. Francisca Coello de Portugal y Ramírez
- 327. María de la Soledad Bernaldo de Quirós y Colón de Larreátegui
- 328. Rosa del Corro, wife of Pío Pita Pizarro, Minister of Economy
- 329. María de la Concepción de Castro
- 330. Jacoba Ortiz de Taranco y Sáez de Nieto
- 331. María de los Dolores Traggia de Torres
- 332. María de la Encarnación de Cueto y Ortega
- 333. Princess Maria Amélia of Brazil, daughter of Empress Amélie of Brazil, 295th Dame
- 334. Carolina Mortier de Trévise
- 335. Francisca de Brito Pinto
- 336. María de los Dolores de Borja y Fernández Buenache, 1st marchioness of Camachos, 3rd marchioness of Casa Tilly
- 337. Adelaida María O'Kelly y Castilla
- 338. Princess Januária of Brazil, countess of Aquila, daughter of Emperor Pedro I, half-sister of Princess Maria Amélia, 333rd Dame.
- 339. Maria Ana Luisa Filomena de Mendoça
- 340. Maria Teresa Margarida Horan FitzGerald
- 341. Joaquina del Corral y Arias
- 342. María Francisca de Villanueva y Sousa
- 343. Queen Anna of the Netherlands (William II's wife), née Grand-Duchess Anna Pavlovna of Russia
- 344. María de Belén González de Larrínaga y Benítez
- 345. María de la Soledad Samaniego y Asprer
- 346. María Luisa Sánchez Pleytés y García de la Peña
- 347. María del Patrocinio Goicoolea y Ariza
- 348. María Juana Lassus y Vallés
- 349. María de la Concepción Ortiz de Sandoval y Arias de Saavedra
- 350. Isabel de Heredia y Livermore, countess consort of Zaldívar
- 351. María del Pilar Juez Sarmiento y Mollinedo
- 352. María del Rosario Bernuy y Valda
- 353. Isabel Domínguez y Guevara
- 354. Manuela Domínguez Navas
- 355. María de la Soledad Bernuy y Valda
- 356. María de la Encarnación Fernández de Córdova y Álvarez de Bohorques
- 357. María de la Paz de Queralt y Bucarelli
- 358. María del Carmen Álvarez de Bohorques y Giráldez
- 359. María Ramona de Campos y Matheos
- 360. Rafaela Anzano y Parreño
- 361. Micaela de Frías y Altamirano
- 362. María de Uribe y Samaniego
- 363. María de la Paz Rodríguez de Valcárcel y O'Conry
- 364. María del Carmen Villavicencio y Pita da Veiga
- 365. Mariana de Miranda y Olmedilla
- 366. María del Rosario Valdés y Ramírez de Jove
- 367. María de la Candelaria Díaz de Riguero y Gutiérrez de la Concha
- 368. Queen Maria Theresa of Two-Sicilies (Ferdinand II's wife), née archduchess Maria Theresa of Austria-Teschen
- 369. Marie Alexandrine de Tascher, relative of (Joséphine de Beauharnais), Empress of the French
- 370. Manuela María Bargés y Petre
- 371. María Francisca Palafox Portocarrero y KirkPatrick, 12th duchess of Peñaranda,
- 372. María de la Concepción Coello de Portugal y Ramírez
- 373. Gabriela del Alcázar y Vera de Aragón, 7th duchess of Sotomayor
- 374. Princess Victoria of Saxe-Coburg and Gotha, duchess of Nemours
- 375. Princess Adélaïde of Orléans, mademoiselle de Chartres, sister of Louis-Philippe I of the French
- 376. María de los Dolores Aguirre y Rosales
- 377. María de la O Jacoba Giráldez y Cañas
- 378. María del Carmen de la Pezuela y Ceballos
- 379. Isabel Josefa de Aranda y Salazar
- 380. Luisa Carlota de Pechpeyron de Cominges de Guitaut
- 381. María del Pilar de la Cerda y Gand-Vilain
- 382. Ana Jaspe y Macías, duchess consort de Escalona
- 383. Nicolasa de Aragón y Arias de Saavedra
- 384. Joaquina Patiño y Ramírez de Arellano
- 385. Josefa de Tudó, 1st Countess of Castillo Fiel
- 386. María Manuela de Negrete y Cepeda
- 387. María Teresa Trejo del Campo
- 388. María de África Josefa Fernández de Córdoba
- 389. María Dominga Bernaldo de Quirós y Colón de Larreátegui
- 390. María de la Encarnación Osorio de Moscoso y Ponce de León
- 391. Valerie de Beaufort-Spontin
- 392. Francisca Merino de la Cuadra
- 393. Antonia María Carcelén Ladrón de Guevara
- 394. María del Carmen Pérez Ladrón de Guevara, 5th marchioness of CasasViejas
- 395. Francisca de Paula de Tovar y Peguera
- 396. María del Carmen de Ibarrola y Mollinedo, countess consort of Carlet
- 397. María Josefa Casilda de Ibarrola y Mollinedo, marchioness consort of Mirasol
- 398. María de los Dolores de Chaves y Artacho
- 399. María del Rosario de Queralt y Bucarelli
- 400. Josefa de Ceballos y Álvarez de Faria
- 401. María de los Dolores de Urzáiz y de Castro
- 402. María Eduvigis Gutiérrez Vigil y del Castillo
- 403. María de la Encarnación Gayoso de los Cobos y Téllez Girón
- 404. María de los Desamparados-Carmen Bernuy y Valda
- 405. Antonina Venegas de Saavedra y Torres
- 406. Luisa de Villanueva y Zayas
- 407. María Manuela de Godoy y Armendáriz
- 408. María de los Ángeles del Álamo y Algaba
- 409. Inés Blake y Tovar
- 410. Princess Maria Carolina of Bourbon-Two Sicilies, duchess consort of Aumale
- 411. Manuela Mon y Menéndez
- 412. Josefa Díaz Armero
- 413. María Teresa de Villalpando y San Juan
- 414. María de los Dolores Goicoolea y Ariza
- 415. María Teresa Tavira y Acosta
- 416. Josefa López Montenegro
- 417. María de la Soledad Vázquez Alcalá
- 418. María de la Concepción Goicoolea y Ariza
- 419. María de los Dolores de Contreras y Aranda
- 420. Eulalie de L'Espine
- 421. Alejandra Muñoz Sánchez
- 422. María de la Concepción Doz y Gordon
- 423. Felicia de Alvear y Fernández de Lara
- 424. Louise Mitchell Meredith Read, Marchioness of Tomar
- 425. María de la Concepción Aristizábal y Lacassaigne
- 426. María Cayetana de Acuña y Dewitte
- 427. Isabel Borrell y Lemus
- 428. María de los Dolores Perinat y Ochoa, wife of Joaquín Francisco Pacheco y Gutiérrez-Calderón, Prime Minister of Spain
- 429. María Josefa de Allendesalazar y Mazarredo
- 430. Petronila Livermore y Salas, marchioness consort of Salamanca
- 431. María Teresa Chaves y Loaísa
- 432. María Antonia Godínez y Cea Bermúdez
- 433. Joaquina de Queralt y Bucarelli
- 434. María de los Dolores Gardoqui y Jarabeitia
- 435. María de los Dolores Mirasol y Bernad
- 436. María de los Dolores Serrano y Domínguez
- 437. María Benedicta de Castro Canto e Melo Pereira
- 438. María del Pilar Salvador y Udi
- 439. María del Carmen Quintana y Romo, marchioness consort of Guad-el-Jelú
- 440. Juana García Gómez
- 441. María del Rosario Izquierdo y Lassaleta
- 442. Teresa Romano y Rizo
- 443. María de los Dolores Gómez de la Serna y de las Casas
- 444. Manuela García de Molviedro
- 445. María Amalia Lambelin, marchioness consort of Recalmici
- 446. Marie Susanne Oakey
- 447. Joaquina Bernaldo de Quirós y Colón de Larreátegui
- 448. Genoveva de Apéstegui y López de Gamarra
- 449. María Cristina de Sorróndegui y Martínez de Alcaide
- 450. María del Carmen Machín y Martínez de Alcaide
- 451. María de las Mercedes Manuel de Villena y Justiniani
- 452. María de la Concepción del Nero y Salamanca
- 453. Vicenta Salvador y Frías
- 454. María del Carmen de Guzmán y Caballero
- 455. Narcisa Martínez de Irujo y McKean
- 456. María Julia Rebolledo de Palafox
- 457. Rosa López de Carrizosa y Dávila
- 458. Manuela Baltasara del Mazo y Blake
- 459. Ana Berroeta y del Villar
- 460. María Ana D'Adda
- 461. Crescencia de Aguirre-Solarte y Alcíbar
- 462. María Cristina Osorio de Moscoso y Carvajal, 12th duchess of Sanlúcar la Mayor
- 463. Princess Marie Isabelle of Orléans, countess consort of Paris
- 464. Luisa Federica Juana Emmy de Zesterfleth
- 465. Fausta González-Torres de Navarra y Álvarez de Bohorques
- 466. María de los Ángeles Soler y Lacy
- 467. Sabina Benítez de Parejo
- 468. Teresa, princess Colonna
- 469. Fernanda de Villarroel y Goicoolea
- 470. María de las Mercedes Alcalá Galiano y Valencia
- 471. María Amelia de Orleans, infanta of Spain
- 472. María Narcisa de Pastors y de Sala
- 473. Isabella, Princess of Asturias
- 474. Maria Cristina of Orléans, infanta of Spain
- 475. Empress Eugénie of the French, née Eugénie de Montijo, countess of Teba
- 476. Princess Margherita of Bourbon-Parma, Duchess consort of Madrid
- 477. Grand Duchess Alice of Tuscany (Ferdinand IV's wife), née Princess Alice of Parma
- 478. Louise Genthner
- 479. Fernandina Montenegro y Cogordan
- 480. Isabel Prieto-Tirado y Rañón
- 481. Empress Elisabeth of Austria, née Duchess Elisabeth in Bavaria (Sissi)
  (mother of Gisela, 601st Dame, daughter of Ludovika, 613th Dame and sister of Helene, 815th Dame and Maria Sophie, 552nd Dame)
- 482. Ana María de Sevilla y Villanueva
- 483. Leocadia de Echagüe y Aracués
- 484. María del Carmen Ozores y Mosquera
- 485. Isabel, Princess Imperial of Brazil
- 486. María de los Dolores Tosta González
- 487. Infanta Maria Anna of Portugal, Princess George of Saxony
- 488. Eugénia de Saldanha de Oliveira e Daun
- 489. María Joaquina de Miranda y Rivas
- 490. María del Rosario de Areizaga y Magallón
- 491. María de los Dolores Collado y Echagüe
- 492. María Luisa Álvarez de las Asturias Bohorques y Giráldez
- 493. Inés de Silva
- 494. Luisa Napoleona Mouton de Lobau
- 495. Gertrudis Enríquez y Sequera
- 496. María de la Concepción de Castañeda y Neve
- 497. Infanta Antónia of Portugal, princess consort of Hohenzollern
- 498. María Isabel Queipo de Llano y Gayoso de los Cobos
- 499. Queen Carola of Saxony, née Carola of Vasa, princess of Sweden
- 500. Francisca de Paula de Agüero y González, duchess of Prim
- 501. María Ana Catalina de Ricci
- 502. Antonia Domínguez y Borrell
- 503. Queen Marie of Bavaria (Maximilian II's wife), née princess Marie of Prussia
- 504. María de los Dolores Bonilla y Valdivia
- 505. Cristina Gordon y Prendergast
- 506. Anna Isabella de Bocholtz-Asseburg
- 507. Josefa Rosa de Amorim
- 508. María de la Regla de Orléans (1856-1861), infanta de España
- 509. Rosa de Losada y Miranda
- 510. María Amalia Justiniani y Núñez de Castro
- 511. María Teresa Riquelme y Arce
- 512. Ángela Muñoz de Salazar y Martorell
- 513. Caralampia Arizcun y Flórez
- 514. Gorgonia de Entrala y Férriz de Guzmán
- 515. Empress Maria Alexandrovna of Russia (Alexander II's wife), née princess Marie of Hesse and by Rhine
- 516. Charlotte de Brunnon
- 517. Luisa Constantina de Croÿ, countess consort of Benckendorff (princess of Croÿ)
- 518. Rafaela Domínguez y Navas, marchioness consort of Santa Marina
- 519. countess of Demoulins
- 520. María del Rosario Fernández de Santillán y Valdivia
- 521. Baronesa de Malsen
- 522. Francisca Javiera Osborne y Böhl de Faber
- 523. Isabel Álvarez de Toledo y Silva
- 524. Princess Clémentine of Orléans, Princess of Saxe-Coburg and Gotha
- 525. Empress Carlota of Mexico (Maximilian I's wife), née princess Charlotte of Belgium (Daughter of Queen Louise Marie, 298th Dame)
- 526. Princess Maria Clotilde of Savoy, Princess Napoléon Bonaparte
- 527. María de los Dolores de Cárdenas y Orozco
- 528. Isabel de León e Ibarrola
- 529. María del Pilar de Villanueva y Carbonell
- 530. María del Rosario Desmaissiéres y Fernández de Santillán
- 531. María Isabel de la Pezuela y Ceballos
- 532. María Josefa del Corral y Suelves
- 533. María del Pilar de Chaves y Loaysa
- 534. María del Pilar de Liñán y Fernández
- 535. María Teresa León y Cobos
- 536. Joaquina de Silva y Fernández de Córdova
- 537. Sofía Moscoso de Altamira Taboada, 2nd countess of Fontao
- 538. María del Carmen Pascual del Pobil y Ponce de León
- 539. María Ana de Dusay y de Fivaller
- 540. Queen Sophie of the Netherlands, Grand-Duchess of Luxembourg (William III's wife) née princess Sophie of Württemberg
- 541. Baronesa de Wendland
- 542. María de las Angustias de Zuloaga y Alvarado
- 543. María de la Paz Ximénez de Bagüés
- 544. María Ramona Sánchez Arjona y Jaraquemada
- 545. Manuela de la Paciencia Fernández de Córdova y Güemes
- 546. Jacoba Valdés e Inclán
- 547. Matilde de Carondelet y Donado
- 548. Inés Patiño y Osorio
- 549. María Josefa Coello de Portugal y Quesada
- 550. Albina Tresserra y Thompson
- 551. Matilde Díaz Trechuelo y Ostman
- 552. Queen Maria Sophie of the Two Sicilies (Francis II's wife), née duchess Maria Sophie in Bavaria
  (daughter of Ludovika, 613th Dame, sister of Empress Sissi, 481st Dame and Duchess Helene, 815th Dame)
- 553. María del Carmen Lucía de Acuña y Dewitte, 9th marchioness of Castrofuerte
- 554. Julia Grund
- 555. María de las Mercedes Pérez del Pulgar y Fernández de Córdoba
- 556. Agustina de Halen y Lasquetty
- 557. Ana del Castillo de Souza
- 558. Amalia Heredia Livermore, marchioness consort of Casa-Loring
- 559. Mariana Georgina Pereira Palha de Faria Lacerda
- 560. Julia Trophimovna, princesa consorte Galitzina (condesa Baranova)
- 561. María Serafina de Montalvo y Cárdenas
- 562. Queen Maria de las Mercedes of Spain (Alfonso XII's wife), née Maria de las Mercedes of Orléans y Borbon, infanta of Spain
- 563. Isabel Barutell y Bazzoni
- 564. Jean de Tolstoy
- 565. Francisca de Allendesalazar y Loizaga
- 566. Paula de Orúe y Bajos
- 567. Grand Duchess Mathilde Caroline of Hesse (Louis III's wife), née Princess Mathilde Caroline of Bavaria
- 568. Elena Alcalá-Galiano y Valencia
- 569. Adelaida de Guzmán y Caballero
- 570. María del Carmen Pizarro y Ramírez, 4th. Countess of las Navas
- 571. Rosa Prendergast y Gordon
- 572. María Celestina Balez y Goicoechea
- 573. María de los Desamparados Muñoz y Borbón
- 574. María de los Milagros Muñoz y de Borbón, marchioness of Castillejo
- 575. María Cristina Muñoz y Borbón, 1st marchioness of la Isabela
- 576. Laureana Díaz de Mendoza y Valcárcel
- 577. María de los Dolores Díaz de Mendoza y Valcárcel
- 578. Infanta María del Pilar of Spain, daughter of Isabella II of Spain, 250th Dame
  (sister of Infanta María de la Paz, 593rd and Infanta Eulalia, 620th)
- 579. María del Pilar de Zavala y Guzmán, 20th marchioness of Aguilar de Campoo
- 580. Emilie Hegnauer
- 581. Amalia Núñez de Castro y Arizabalo
- 582. María del Carmen Fernández de Córdova y Álvarez de Bohorques
- 583. Carlota Sáenz de Viniegra y Velasco
- 584. Francisca Tacón y Aché
- 585. María Josefa de Silva y Téllez Girón
- 586. María de la Encarnación O'Lawlor y Caballero
- 587. María de los Dolores Cistué y Bernaldo de Quirós
- 588. Archduchess Auguste Ferdinande of Austria, wife of Luitpold, Prince Regent of Bavaria (mother of Pr. Theresa Charlotte, 629th Dame)
- 589. María de los Dolores Garcés de Marcilla y Heredia
- 590. Francisca de Pando e Iglesias
- 591. María Blanca Fernández de Córdova y Álvarez de Bohorques
- 592. Joaquina de Pedro y Nash
- 593. Infanta María de la Paz of Spain, Princess Ludwig Ferdinand of Bavaria
  (daughter of Isabella II of Spain, 250th Dame; mother of Princess Pilar of Bavaria, 901st; sister of María del Pilar, 578th and Eulalia, 620th)
- 594. María de la Cruz Álvarez y Alonso
- 595. Vicenta Fernández de Luco y Santa Cruz
- 596. Vicenta Gutiérrez de la Concha y Fernández de Luco
- 597. Carolina Gutiérrez de los Ríos y Rodríguez-Guerrero de Luna
- 598. María del Carmen Cabeza de Vaca y Diosdado
- 599. Fernanda Gavarre y Pérez del Pulgar
- 600. Josefa de Arce y Muñoz-Flores
- 601. Archduchess Gisela of Austria, Princess Leopold of Bavaria (daughter of Sissi, 481st Dame, granddaughter of Ludovika, 613th Dame)
- 602. María Josefa de Cárdenas y Beitia
- 603. María de Jesús de Herrera y Herrera
- 604. Georgina Manvers Manby
- 605. Marie Mathilde Julie Hermine de Saint-Cricq
- 606. Princess Leopoldina of Brazil, Princess Ludwig August of Saxe-Coburg and Gotha
- 607. Queen Marie Henriette of the Belgians (Léopold II's wife), née archduchess Marie Henriette of Austria
  (sister of Archduchess Elisabethh Franciska, 806th Dame and mother of Princess Stéphanie, 829th Dame)
- 608. Octavia de Saavedra y Cueto
- 609. María de la Esperanza Pérez de Tafalla y Zuloaga
- 610. Princess Maria Annunciata of Bourbon-Two Sicilies, 2nd wife of Archduke Karl Ludwig of Austria (mother of Franz Ferdinand & Otto Franz)
- 611. Queen Marie of Hannover (George V's wife), née princess Marie of Saxe-Altenburg
- 612. Princess Isabella of Bavaria, Princess Thomas of Italy, duchess consort of Genoa
  (daughter of Infanta Amelia Philippina, 296th Dame and sister of Clara, 1109th Dame; niece of King-Consort Francis of Spain, Duke of Cádiz)
- 613. Princess Ludovika of Bavaria, duchess Maximilian Joseph in Bavaria
  (mother of Empress Sissi, 481st Dame and Duchess Helene, 815th Dame, grandmother of Gisela of Austria, 601st Dame)
- 614. María de la Concepción de Herrera y Ayala
- 615. Joaquina García Vicuria
- 616. Ramona Dolores Cortés y Bautista
- 617. Felisa Blanco y Guerrero
- 618. Matilde Cervetto y Blanco
- 619. María de Gracia Ladoux y Bonal
- 620. Infanta Eulalia of Spain, duchess of Galliera, daughter of Queen Isabella II, 250th Dame
  (sister of Infanta María del Pilar, 578th Dame and Infanta María de la Paz, 593rd Dame)
- 621. Lucie Borchgrave d'Altena, condesa Borchgrave d'Altena
- 622. María del Carmen Matheu-Arias-Dávila y Carondelet
- 623. María del Buen Consejo de Losada y Fernández de Liencres
- 624. Maria Servelloni, countess consort Crivelli
- 625. María de Aguilera y Santiago de Perales
- 626. Anna Debelle, duchess consort de Rivoli
- 627. Pauline van der Linden d'Hooghvorst
- 628. Ana Micaela Guerrero, wife of Lorenzo Arrazola y García, Spanish Prime Minister
- 629. Princess Theresa Charlotte of Bavaria (daughter of Archduchess Auguste Ferdinande, 588th Dame)
- 630. María de los Dolores Remisa y Rafo
- 631. Josefa Godoy de Lara
- 632. María Francisca de Borja Fernández de Córdova y Bernaldo de Quirós
- 633. María de la Concepción Fernández de Córdova y Campos
- 634. Emilia Páez-Jaramillo y Vicente
- 635. María Elvira Fernández de Córdova y Álvarez de Bohorques
- 636. María de la Concepción Aguado y Flores
- 637. Ana de Francisco-Martín y Orrantia
- 638. María Cristina Osorio de Moscoso y Borbón
- 639. María de la Asunción Sanchiz y Castillo
- 640. Sara Castilla y Gómez de Cádiz
- 641. María Luisa de Salamanca y Negrete
- 642. Queen Maria Pia of Portugal (Luís I's wife), née Maria Pia of Savoy, princess of Italy
- 643. Ana, princesa Murat
- 644. María Leonor Crescencia Catalina de Salm-Salm, princess of Salm-Salm
- 645. María del Carmen de Aguirre-Solarte y Alcíbar
- 646. Joaquina Fidalgo y Aguirre
- 647. María de los Dolores de Bustos y Riquelme
- 648. María de los Dolores Pizarro y Ramírez
- 649. Joaquina de Samaniego y Lassús
- 650. Ana María Pérez de Vargas y Castrillo
- 651. Princess Florestine of Monaco, duchess Wilhelm of Urach
- 652. Ramona García y Carrera
- 653. Juana de Zavala y Guzmán
- 654. Genoveva Samaniego y Pando
- 655. Elisa Bayne
- 656. María Josefa Marín y San Martín
- 657. Enriqueta María Roca de Togores y Corradini
- 658. Mariana Fernández de Córdova y Vera de Aragón
- 659. María de los Dolores de Múxica y Uribe
- 660. Filomena Fernández de Henestrosa y Santisteban
- 661. María de la Encarnación Pacheco y García
- 662. Emilia Moldenhaver Brandes
- 663. Charlotte Elisabeth Mary Smith-Athelston
- 664. María Grimanesa de Zavala y Guzmán
- 665. María de los Remedios Chacón y Romero de Cisneros
- 666. María Isabel Sofía Valera y Alcalá-Galiano
- 667. Maria da Conceição de Castro Quintela Emauz
- 668. countess of Sousa
- 669. Teresa Francisca de Melo Breyner Sousa Tavares e Moura, 2nd countess of Melo, 20th lady de Melo
- 670. Gabriela Isabel de Sousa Coutinho, 2nd marchioness of Funchal
- 671. Isabel Cristina María de la Paz Mesía y de Queralt
- 672. María de Gracia Lasso de la Vega y Quintanilla
- 673. María del Pilar Álvarez de Toledo y Álvarez de Toledo
- 674. Frances Erskine Inglis, 1st marchioness of Calderón de la Barca
- 675. Pascuala Mayáns y Enríquez de Navarra
- 676. Maria de Almeida Portugal
- 677. Maria de Lima
- 678. Luisa de Lilien
- 679. Ana de Gregorioy Márquez
- 680. María de los Dolores Alberni y Carro
- 681. María Josefa de Medrano y Maldonado
- 682. María de la Purificación de Pineda y Apéstegui
- 683. Josefa Jaspe y Macías
- 684. Josefa Gaviria y Alcova
- 685. Carlota de Pando y Mofino
- 686. Inés Sanz de Vallés y Montserrat
- 687. Águeda Bernaldo de Quirós y Colón de Larreátegui
- 688. María Francisca Escrivá de Romaní y Dusay
- 689. María de las Mercedes de Heredia y Zafra-Vázquez
- 690. María de la Merced de Ferrer y de Manresa
- 691. Josefa Sangro
- 692. Jacinta Gutiérrez de la Concha y Fernández de Luco
- 693. Isabel Álvarez y Montes
- 694. María de la Soledad Fernández de Córdova y Aguilar
- 695. Ramona Valledor y Ciño
- 696. María de las Mercedes de Fivaller y Centurión
- 697. Princess Maria Antonietta of Bourbon-Two Sicilies, Princess Alfonso of Two Sicilies, countess consort of Caserta
- 698. Archduchess Maria Isabella of Austria-Tuscany, Princess Francis of the Two Sicilies, countess consort of Trápani (mother of the former)
- 699. Victoria Colonna y Álvarez de Toledo
- 700. Princess María Inmacutada Luisa of Bourbon-Two Sicilies, Princess Henry of Parma, countess consort of Bardi
- 701. Princess Maria Pia of Bourbon-Two Sicilies, 1st wife of Robert I, Duke of Parma
- 702. María Ana de Sarria y Albis, viscountess consort de Ayala
- 703. Hoshiar Walda Pasha, wife of Ibrahim Pasha of Egypt
- 704. Antonia González Echevarría, 1st countess of Agüero
- 705. Maria Teresa de Assis Mascarenhas
- 706. Maria Francisca de Paula Orta
- 707. Thérèse Gravier
- 708. Rosa Mariana Biester
- 709. Louise Marie Rogier
- 710. Virginia Oldoini, countess of Castiglione and of Costigliole
- 711. Agnes Millet d'Arvillars
- 712. Natalia Obrescoff, princess consort di Striano
- 713. Ana Negrotto-Cambiaso
- 714. Maria Luísa de Sousa Holstein, 3rd Duchess of Palmela
- 715. Laura Acton
- 716. María Leticia Bonaparte-Wyse, princess consort of Solms
- 717. Carlota, nobile Richetta de Valgorja
- 718. Cecilia Benoist
- 719. Maria Maffei di Boglio
- 720. Paola Luisa Enrichetta Rignon, countess Rignon
- 721. Princess Elisabeth of Saxony, Princess Ferdinand of Savoy, Duchess consort of Genoa (Queen Margherita of Italy's mother)
- 722. Queen Margherita of Italy (Umberto I's wife), née princess Margherita of Savoy-Genoa (inspiring the pizza Margherita)
- 723. Princess Marie of Belgium, Countess of Flanders, née Princess Marie of Hohenzollern-Sigmaringen (mother of King Albert I of Belgium)
- 724. Queen Alexandra of the United Kingdom (Edward VII's wife), née Princess Alexandra of Denmark
  (daughter of Queen Louise of Denmark, 773rd Dame and sister of Princess Thyra of Denmark, 814th Dame and Princess Dagmar of Denmark, 871st Dame)
- 725. Elen Wededing
- 726. María Josefa Mariátegui y Compton
- 727. María de la Paz Barbadillo
- 728. María Antonia Ros de Olano y Quintana, 2nd marchioness of Guad-el-Jelú, Dame of Queen María Victoria
- 729. Nicolasa Gallo de Alcántara y Sives
- 730. Gabriela de Anduaga y Mejía
- 731. Elisabeth de La Croix de Castries
- 732. Luisa de Koudriafsky
- 733. Séverine Rosalie von Löwenthal
- 734. Francisca Ramírez y Maroto
- 735. Edesia Aquavera y Arahuete
- 736. María Isabel Manuel de Villena y Álvarez de las Asturias, 13th Marchioness of Rafal
- 737. Friederike Luise von Riegels
- 738. María del Carmen Hernández Espinosa de los Monteros
- 739. María de los Dolores de Balanzat y Bretagne de Carrión, marchioness consort de Nájera
- 740. María del Amparo Sorróndegui y Martínez-Alcaide
- 741. Matilde de Altuna y López
- 742. María del Rosario de Giles y Rivero
- 743. María de las Nieves Rodríguez de Arellano y Armendáriz
- 744. María Isabel Nieulant y Villanueva
- 745. María del Pilar Arias-Quiroga y Escalera
- 746. María Ana Catalina Richards
- 747. María Jacinta Orlando e Ibarrola
- 748. Elvira Bález y de la Quadra
- 749. Archduchess María Carolina of Austria-Teschen, wife of Rainer Ferdinand of Austria, daughter of Archduke Charles, Duke of Teschen
- 750. Adela Mathilda Helbert
- 751. Teresa Carralón y La Rúa
- 752. María de los Ángeles de Rivera y Olavide
- 753. Enriqueta de Cea Bermúdez y Navarro
- 754. Margarita Larios y Martínez de Tejada
- 755. María Amada Batiz de Uribarren, 1st countess of Uribarren
- 756. Katharine, condesa Kenderffy de Malowitz
- 757. Isidra de Quesada y Gutiérrez de los Ríos
- 758. Louise-Marguerite de Ward
- 759. Mélanie Louise de Champs de Saint-Léger
- 760. Balbina Monserrat y Marcos
- 761. Princess Sofia Sergeievna Troubetzkoy
- 762. María Josefa de Arteaga y Silva
- 763. Isabel Daguerre y Garreta
- 764. María del Pilar de Guzmán y de la Cerda
- 765. María de las Angustias de Arizcún y Heredia
- 766. María Luisa de Sotto y Campuzano
- 767. Leonor Rigalt y Muns
- 768. María Josefa Castrillón y Mera (es)
- 769. Micaela Arámburu y Silva
- 770. María Brignole-Sale, duquesa consorte de Galliera
- 771. Clara Emilia MacDonell y Ulbrick, marchioness consort of las Marismas del Guadalquivir
- 772. Harriet Alice Day, baronesa consorte Borthwick
- 773. Queen Louise of Denmark (Christian IX's wife), née princess and landgravine Louise of Hesse-Kassel
  (mother of Alexandra of Denmark, 724th Dame, Princess Thyra of Denmark, 814th Dame and Princess Dagmar of Denmark, 871st Dame)
- 774. Josefa del Águila y Ceballos
- 775. María Celina Alfonso y Aldama
- 776. Justina Maria da Silva
- 777. Honorina Baamonde y Ortega
- 778. Laura Brunetti y Gayoso de los Cobos
- 779. Enriqueta Cabarrús y Kirkpatrick, countess of Nava de Tajo
- 780. Faustina Casado y Posadillo
- 781. María Belén de Echagüe y Méndez de Vigo
- 782. María del Carmen Gutiérrez de la Concha y Fernández de Luco
- 783. Ramona Hurtado de Mendoza y Ruiz de Otazu
- 784. Helene Josephine Moulton, countess consort of Hatzfeld-Wildenburg-Weissweiler
- 785. María del Pilar Jordán de Urríes y Ruiz de Arana
- 786. Victoria de los Santos Avilés y Dorticós
- 787. María Josefa de Vargas y Díez de Bulnes
- 788. Empress Victoria of Germany (Frederick III's wife), née Victoria, Princess Royal (daughter of Queen Victoria, 288th Dame)
- 789. María Luisa Carlota de Barroeta-Aldamar y González de Echávarri
- 790. Josefa de Collado y Ranero, 1ª marchioness of Revilla de la Cañada
- 791. María del Rosario Téllez-Girón y Fernández de Velasco
- 792. Josefa Caballero y Muguiro
- 793. Carolina Lasquetty y Castro
- 794. Gabriela Manuela Chapman y Randolph
- 795. Princess Anna of Prussia, princess and landgravine Frederick William of Hesse-Kassel
- 796. Manuela Castarión Posada
- 797. María Josefa Ruiz del Burgo y Basabrú
- 798. Rosa de Bustos y Riquelme
- 799. Constança Maria de Figueiredo Cabral da Camara
- 800. Josefa Pimentel de Menezes Brito do Rio
- 801. Eulalia de Solms
- 802. Grand-Duchess Louise of Baden (Frederick I's wife), née Princess Louise of Prussia
- 803. María de los Dolores de Abarzuza y Saris
- 804. Inés Goiry y Adot, marchioness consort de Balboa
- 805. Queen María Cristina of Spain (Alfonso XII's wife), née archduchess Maria Christina of Austria-Teschen
- 806. Archduchess Elisabeth Franziska of Austria, Queen María Cristina's mother and Queen Marie Henriette of the Belgians's sister (607th Dame)
- 807. Gabriela Pallavicini
- 808. Maria Melania Lucila Jullienne de Jaurés
- 809. María Luisa de Carvajal y Dávalos
- 810. María del Rosario Falcó y Osorio
- 811. Caralampia Méndez de Vigo y Arizcun
- 812. Queen Emma of the Netherlands (William III's wife), née Princess Emma of Waldeck and Pyrmont (mother of Queen Wilhelmina, 897th Dame)
- 813. Queen Maria Theresa of Bavaria (Ludwig III's wife), née archduchess Maria Theresa of Austria-Este, princess of Modena
- 814. Princess Thyra of Denmark, Crown Princess of Hanover
  (daughter of Queen Louise of Denmark, 773th Dame and sister of Princess Alexandra, 724th Dame and Princess Dagmar, 871st Dame)
- 815. Duchess Helene in Bavaria, Hereditary Princess of Thurn and Taxis
  (sister of Empress Sissi, 481st Dame and Maria Sophie, 552nd Dame; daughter of Princess Ludovika, 613th Dame)
- 816. Infanta Mercedes of Spain, Princess of Asturias (daughter of Alfonso XII of Spain and Queen Maria Chritina, 805th Dame; sister of Maria Teresa, 845th Dame)
- 817. María Eulalia Osorio de Moscoso y Carvajal
- 818. Isabel de Vinent y O'Neill, 2nd marchioness of Vinent
- 819. Isabel de Orovio y Fernández de Urrutia
- 820. Maria da Assunção da Mata de Sousa Coutinho, 1st marchioness of Penafiel
- 821. María de las Mercedes de Ajuria y Munar
- 822. María de Heredia y Livermore, countess consort of Aguiar
- 823. María de la Concepción O'Farrill y Montalvo
- 824. Joaquina Domínguez y Puente
- 825. Luisa Helena Autard de Bragard
- 826. María Rafaela de Miorio y Urra
- 827. Felisa Ozores y Mosquera
- 828. Antonia Rodríguez de Valcárcel y Castillo
- 829. Princess Stéphanie of Belgium, Crown Princess of Austria, Hungary and Bohemia (Rudolf, Crown Prince of Austria's wife)
  (daughter of Queen Marie Henriette of the Belgians, 607th Dame and granddaughter of Queen Louise Marie of the Belgians, 298th Dame)
- 830. Empress Augusta of Germany (Emperor Wilhelm II's wife), née princess Augusta Victoria of Schleswig-Holstein-Sonderburg-Augustenburg
- 831. Teresa Matilde Sofía, condesa Eckbrecht von Dürckheim-Montmartin
- 832. Elena Hano y Mac-Mahon
- 833. María de los Dolores Madán y O'Sullivan
- 834. Marie Amélie Green de Saint Marsault, countess consort of Sardelys
- 835. Queen Elisabeth of Romanía (Carol I of Romania's wife), née Princess Elisabeth of Wied
- 836. Anne Zoé Bernex Philipon
- 837. Trinidad de Vargas y Díez de Bulnes
- 838. María del Rosario Losada y Fernández de Liencres
- 839. María del Rosario Pérez de Barradas y Fernández de Córdoba
- 840. Ana de Sousa Coutinho de Mendoça
- 841. Eugénia Xavier Teles da Gama, 2nd marchioness of Unhão
- 842. Leopoldina D'Adda
- 843. Aline Correia Henriques
- 844. Teresa Caracciolo
- 845. Infanta Maria Teresa of Spain, princess of Bavaria (daughter of Alfonso XII of Spain and Queen Maria Chritina, 805th Dame; sister of Mercedes, 816th Dame)
- 846. Livia Carafa della Stadera
- 847. Queen Olga of the Hellenes (George I of Greece's wife), née grand-duchess Olga Constantinovna of Russia
- 848. Virginia Coronado y Romero de Tejada
- 849. María Sánchez de Marcos
- 850. Antonia Laura Alberti y Caro
- 851. Olga Luisa Margarita de Feltz-Raasfelt
- 852. Amalia Isabel Carlota, condesa Piper
- 853. Edla Luisa Carolina Augusta, condesa Wirsen
- 854. Queen Sophia of Sweden and Norway (Oscar II's wife), née Princess Sophia of Nassau
- 855. Queen Victoria of Sweden (Gustaf V's wife), née Princess Victoria of Baden (and Queen Sophia's daughter-in-law)
- 856. Princess Isabella of Croÿ, Archduchess Friedrich of Austria-Teschen (niece-in-law of Queen María Cristina, 805th Dame)
  (mother of Maria Christina of Austria-Teschen, 1003rd Dame, Isabella of Austria-Teschen, 1031st Dame and María Alice of Austria-Teschen, 1032nd Dame)
- 857. Sofía Josefa Zulueta y Wilcox
- 858. María de la Concepción Castillo y Ramírez de Arellano
- 859. Ana María Cristina Chico de Guzmán y Muñoz
- 860. Princess Elvira Alexandra of Bavaria
- 861. Ofresia Emma Ysaure
- 862. Queen Louise of Denmark (Frederick VIII's wife), née Princess Louise of Sweden-Norway
- 863. Agata Nazar-Aga
- 864. Rosa de Plazaola y Limonta
- 865. Bernardina López de la Torre Ayllón y Jaspe
- 866. María de las Mercedes de Retortillo y Díez
- 867. Queen Amélie of Portugal (Carlos I's wife), née Princess Amélie of Orléans, Princess of France
- 868. María Isabel Ruiz de Arana y Osorio de Moscoso
- 869. María del Milagro de Lara y Sanjuán
- 870. Teresa de Elío y Arteta
- 871. Empress Maria Feodorovna of Russia (Alexander III's wife), née Princess Dagmar of Denmark
  (daughter of Queen Louise of Denmark, 773th Dame and sister of Princess Alexandra, 724th Dame and Princess Thyra, 814th Dame)
- 872. Leonora, baroness Rothschild
- 873. Evelyn Peers Williams
- 874. Natalia Terry y Dorticós
- 875. Ramona de Anduaga y Mejía
- 876. Archduchess Maria Theresa of Austria-Tuscany, Archduchess Charles Stephen of Austria-Teschen (sister-in-law of Queen Maria Christina, 805th Dame)
- 877. María Emilia Cancela Seabra
- 878. María de los Dolores Delavat y Areas
- 879. Francisca Jacinta Nogueira da Gama
- 880. Grand Duchess Maria Alexandrovna of Russia, Duchess consort of Saxe-Coburg and Gotha (wife of Prince Alfred of UK, Duke of Edinburgh, Duke of Saxe-Coburg and Gotha)
  (mother of Queen Marie of Romania, 1007th Dame, Princess Beatrice, 1026th Dame and Princess Victoria Melita, 1042th Dame)
- 881. Mariana Margarida de Sequeira Barreto
- 882. Rita Pessoa de Barros e Sá
- 883. María Antonia Fernández de Córdova y Bernaldo de Quirós
- 884. Rosalía Caro y Álvarez de Toledo
- 885. Casilda de Salabert y Arteaga
- 886. Princess Beatrice of the United Kingdom, Princess Henry of Battenberg (daughter of Queen Victoria, 288th Dame and mother of Queen Victoria Eugenie of Spain, 976th Dame)
- 887. Dolores María de Agramonte y Zayas-Bazán, princess consort Radziwiłł
- 888. Franziska Seraphica, countess of Herberstein
- 889. Elisa Uriburu y Uriburu
- 890. Empress Shōken of Japan (Emperor Meiji's wife), née princess Masako Ichijō
- 891. María Matilde de Campos y Cervetto
- 892. María de la Natividad Quindós y Villarroel
- 893. Olga Andreievna Rostoptchin, countess consort Tornielli-Brusati di Vergano
- 894. Duchess Alexandrine of Saxe-Coburg and Gotha (Ernest II's wife), née Princess Alexandrine of Baden
- 895. María Flora de Lemery y Ferrer
- 896. Rosa de Arístegui y Doz
- 897. Queen Wilhelmina of the Netherlands (daughter of Queen Emma, 812th Dame)
- 898. Amalia de Rábago y Hornedo
- 899. María de la Paz Daguerre y Garreta
- 900. María Manuela del Arroyo y Moret
- 901. Princess Pilar of Bavaria (granddaughter of Queen Isabella II of Spain, daughter of Infanta María de la Paz of Spain, 593rd Dame)
- 902. Grand Duchess Consort Maria Pavlovna of Russia, née Duchess Marie of Mecklenburg-Schwerin
- 903. Archduchess Louise of Austria-Tuscany, Crown Princess of Saxony
- 904. Pauline, baronesa de Hoffmann
- 905. María del Carmen Romero Castelló
- 906. Elizabeth Wadsworth Van Rensselaer
- 907. Isabel Francia y Carrió
- 908. Elena Sarasin y Thomas
- 909. Josefa Sandoval de Vasconcellos
- 910. Juana de la Puente y Risco, 7th marchioness of Villafuerte, 2nd countess of Casa Saavedra, countess of Guaqui
- 911. María del Socorro García de Paredes y Argüelles
- 912. María del Pilar de León y de Gregorio
- 913. María del Carmen Rodríguez-Avial y Lloréns
- 914. Joana Rebelo de Chaves
- 915. María Lívia Ferrari Schindler, wife of João Franco, Prime Minister of Portugal
- 916. Alicia Tecla Luisa von Wagner
- 917. SE Princess Pauline of Metternich-Winnenburg (née countess Sándor de Szlavnicza)
- 918. Felicia Radziwiłł, princess consort de Clary-Aldringen
- 919. Princess Hélène of Orléans, duchess Emanuele Filiberto of Aosta
- 920. María del Carmen Martel y Arteaga
- 921. María de la Encarnación Fernández de Córdoba y Carondelet
- 922. María Antonia-Consuelo Manuel de Acuña
- 923. Matilde de León y de Gregorio
- 924. Adelina Douglas de Drummond Wolff
- 925. Empress Alexandra of Russia (Nicholas II's wife), née Alix of Hesse
- 926. Silvia Álvarez de Toledo y Gutiérrez de la Concha
- 927. Helen Vincent Seagrave, wife of Julio de Apezteguía y Tarafa, marquess of Apezteguía
- 928. Ana Germana Bernaldo de Quirós y Muñoz
- 929. Isabel de la Pezuela y Ceballos
- 930. Joaquina Angela Rebolledo de Palafox y Guzmán
- 931. María de los Dolores Salabert y Arteaga
- 932. Princess María Luisa Theresa of Bavaria
- 933. Queen Saovabha Phongsri, Queen Consort and Regent of Siam (Thailand)
- 934. Umeko Itō, wife of the Prime Minister of Japan, Itō Hirobumi
- 935. Léonie Beeckman de Crayloo
- 936. María del Pilar Loreto Osorio y Gutiérrez de los Ríos
- 937. Juana Piñeyro y Echeverri, 7ª countess of Mollina
- 938. María de los Dolores Desmaissiéres y Fernández de Santillán
- 939. Luisa Pérez de Guzmán el Bueno y Gordón
- 940. Josefa Fernández-Durán y Caballero
- 941. María de la Concepción de Arteaga y Gutiérrez de la Concha
- 942. Carlota Espinosa de los Monteros y Guisasola
- 943. Princess Isabelle of Orléans, Duchess of Guise (October 24, 1899)
- 944. Ángela Roca de Togores
- 945. Queen Elena of Italy, née princess Elena of Montenegro
- 946. Emma von und zu Daun
- 947. Henriette Adolphine Humbertine de Mailly-Nesle
- 948. Geneviève de Liedekerke
- 949. María del Patrocinio Patiño y Mesa
- 950. Juana Ruiz de Arana y Saavedra
- 951. Amalia Loring y Heredia, 1st Marchioness of Silvela (Prime Minister Francisco Silvela's widow)
- 952. María Manuela de Urbina y Ceballos-Escalera
- 953. Magdalena Brackembury y Mac Guilloway
- 954. Marie Thérèse Durvis
- 955. María de la Fuencisla Bernaldo de Quirós y Muñoz
- 956. Helena Maria Domingas de Sousa Holstein, 4th duchess of Palmela
- 957. Mariana das Dores de Melo e Abreu Soares de Brito Barbosa Palha de Vasconcelos Guedes, 4th countess of Murça
- 958. Princess Isabel Alfonsa of Bourbon-Two Sicilies, infanta of Spain and countess Zamoyska (Alfonso XII of Spain's granddaughter)
- 959. María de la Concepción Girón y Aragón
- 960. Tomasa Pignatelli de Aragón Cortés
- 961. Duchess Cecilie of Mecklenburg-Schwerin, Crown Princess of Germany and Prussia (Emperor Wilhelm II's daughter-in-law)
- 962. Maria Josepha of Saxony, archduchess of Austria
- 963. María del Rosario González de la Riva y Trespalacios
- 964. María Gayón y Barrié
- 965. Antonia Franco e Iglesias
- 966. Isabel Armada y Fernández de Córdoba
- 967. María Teresa de Muguiro y Cerragería
- 968. María de los Desamparados Bernaldo de Quirós y Muñoz
- 969. María de las Angustias Martos y Arizcun
- 970. Narcisa de Martos y Arizcún
- 971. María de la Encarnación de Silva y Carvajal, countess del Puerto
- 972. María del Pilar de Sentmenat y Patiño
- 973. María del Milagro de León y Liñán
- 974. María del Rosario Rodríguez de Rivas y de la Gándara
- 975. María de la Encarnación de Pablo y Llorente
- 976. Queen Victoria Eugenie of Spain (Alfonso XIII's wife), née princess Victoria Eugenie of Battenberg, daughter of Princess Beatrice of the United Kingdom, 886th Dame)
- 977. Nadine von Ozerow, wife of Joseph Maria von Radowitz Jr.
- 978. Eugénie Marie Thérèse Cambon, wife of the Ambassador of France Jules Martin Cambon (July 20, 1906)
- 979. Eugénia Teles da Silva, 12th Countess of Tarouca
- 980. Isabel Juliana de Saldanha da Gama
- 981. María del Carmen Díaz de Mendoza y Aguado
- 982. Isabel de Silva y Carvajal
- 983. Virginia López de Chicheri y García-Caro, marchioness consort de Sotelo
- 984. María Calderón y Ozores
- 985. Princess Louise of Orléans, princess of France (daughter of Prince Philippe, Count of Paris and Countess of Barcelona's mother)
- 986. Archduchess Maria Dorothea of Austria, Duchess Philippe of Orléans, sister-in-law of the former
- 987. Winifred Cavendish-Bentinck, Duchess of Portland
- 988. María de la Concepción Roca-Tallada y Castellano
- 989. Julia Herrera y Herrera
- 990. Ana Enriqueta de Olano y Loyzaga
- 991. María de la Ascensión González-Neira y Somoza
- 992. Princess Louise Margaret of Prussia, duchess of Connaught and Strathearn
- 993. María de la Trinidad de Scholtz-Hermensdorff, duchess of Parcent
- 994. Fernanda de Salabert y Arteaga
- 995. María del Carmen Hurtado de Zaldívar y Heredia
- 996. Berenguela Collado y del Alcázar
- 997. María del Pilar Caro y Széchényi
- 998. Felicia Bolivia de Francisco-Martín y Orrantia
- 999. María de Belén Rojas y Darnell
- 1000. Ana Girona y Vidal
- 1001. María-Teresa Olivia Cornwallis-West, princess consort of Pless
- 1002. Archduchess Maria Annunciata of Austria, daughter of Archduke Karl Ludwig of Austria
- 1003. Archduchess Maria Christina of Austria-Teschen, Hereditary Princess Emanuel Alfred of Salm-Salm (sister of Isabella, 1031st Dame and María Alice, 1032nd Dame; daughter of Archduchess Isabella of Austria-Teschen, 856th Dame, grandniece of Queen María Cristina, 805th Dame)
- 1004. María Josefa Brusi y García
- 1005. Rosa Reig y Martí
- 1006. Victoria Esperanza Mateo-Sagasta y Vidal, 1st countess of Sagasta
- 1007. Queen Marie of Romania, née princess of Saxe-Coburg and Gotha (granddaughter of Queen Victoria, 288th Dame and daughter of Duchess Maria Alexandrovna of Saxe-Coburg-Gotha, 880th Dame)
- 1008. Esperanza de Saráchaga y Lobanov de Rostov, baroness consort Truchsess von Weltzhausen
- 1009. Princess Helena Victoria of Schleswig-Holstein-Sonderburg-Augustenburg (granddaughter of Queen Victoria, 288th Dame)
- 1010. Itsuko Nashimoto no-miya-hi, marchioness Nabeshima
- 1011. María de la Visitación-Mencía de Collado y del Alcázar
- 1012. María Emilia Torres de Itambi
- 1013. María de los Ángeles Bernar y Llácer
- 1014. María Victoria Montero-Ríos y Villegas
- 1015. Tsuneko no-miya-hi, princesa Fushimi
- 1016. Queen Consort Elisabeth of the Belgians (née Duchess in Bavaria)
- 1017. Emilia Carreras e Iragorry
- 1018. Constance Edwina Cornwallis-West, duchess consort de Westminster
- 1019. Josefa Bouquet Roldán
- 1020. María del Carmen López Andrés
- 1021. María de la Concepción de Azlor de Aragón y Hurtado de Zaldívar
- 1022. María África de Carvajal y Quesada
- 1023. Isabel de Iranzo y Daguerre
- 1024. María de la Trinidad García-Sancho y Zavala
- 1025. María de la Concepción Brunet y Echagüe
- 1026. Princess Beatrice of Saxe-Coburg and Gotha, duchess of Galliera (granddaughter of Queen Victoria, 288th Dame and daughter of Duchess Maria Alexandrovna of Saxe-Coburg-Gotha, 880th Dame)
- 1027. Lucía Ozores y Saavedra
- 1028. Helen Manchester Gates
- 1029. María Josefa Argüelles y Díaz
- 1030. María de la Concepción Benítez Ruiz
- 1031. Archduchess Isabella of Austria, princess Georg of Bavaria (sister of Maria Christina, 1003rd Dame and María Alice, 1032nd Dame; daughter of Archduchess Isabella of Austria-Teschen, 856th Dame, grandniece of Queen María Cristina, 805th Dame)
- 1032. Archduchess María Alice of Austria-Teschen, baroness consort Waldbott von Bassenheim (daughter of Archduke Friedrich of Austria, Duke of Teschen)
- 1033. Archduchess Gabriele of Austria-Teschen (daughter of Archduke Friedrich of Austria, Duke of Teschen)
- 1034. María del Carmen Fernández de Córdoba y Pérez de Barradas
- 1035. Josefa Manzanedo e Intentas
- 1036. Princess Victoria Louise of Prussia, Duchess of Brunswick
- 1037. Angélica Siciliano
- 1038. Carlota Maximiliana Escandón y Barrón
- 1039. Petronila Salamanca y Hurtado de Zaldívar
- 1040. Mary-Anne-Kathleen-Emily Bulkeley-Williams
- 1041. María del Pilar Gayoso de los Cobos y Sevilla
- 1042. Princess Victoria Melita of Saxe-Coburg and Gotha (granddaughter of Queen Victoria, 288th Dame and daughter of Duchess Maria Alexandrovna of Saxe-Coburg-Gotha, 880th Dame)
- 1043. María Salvadora Bermúdez de Castro y Díez
- 1044. María Isabel de Guillamas y Caro, Marquesa of San Felices, Countess of Molin, Countess of Villalcázar de Sirga
- 1045. Casilda Fernández de Henestrosa y Salabert
- 1046. María de la Concepción de Allendesalazar y Bernar
- 1047. Paulina María de la Concepción Bauer y Morpurgo
- 1048. María del Carmen García-Loygorri y Murrieta
- 1049. Teresa Fernández de Villalta y Coca
- 1050. María Luisa de Silva y Fernández de Henestrosa
- 1051. María de la Concepción de Heredia y Grund
- 1052. María Inés de la Gándara y Plazaola
- 1053. Emilia Pardo-Bazán y de la Rúa-Figueroa, 1st Countess of Pardo Bazán (September
- 1054. María Codorníu y Bosch de la Cierva (October 12, 1915)
- 1055. María de los Dolores Armero y Peñalver, Dowager Duchess of Ahumada (July 5, 1915)
- 1056. Juana Bertrán de Lis y Gurowsky (May 10, 1916)
- 1057. Margarita Bertrán de Lis y Gurowsky (May 10, 1916)
- 1058. María del Carmen Barrenechea y Montegui
- 1059. María de la Concepción Camacho y Díaz-Durán
- 1060. Empress Teimei, empress consort of Japan (née princess Sadako Kujō, mother of Emperor Hirohito)
- 1061. Matilde de Ulloa y Calderón
- 1062. María de los Dolores Vallier y García-Alessón
- 1063. Ana de Osma y Zavala, Dowager Countess of Casa Valencia (February 26, 1917)
- 1064. María Luisa López y Nieulant, Dowager Marquise of Albaserrada (February 26, 1917)
- 1065. Ramona López de Ayala y del Hierro
- 1066. María de los Dolores Chávarri y Salazar
- 1067. María del Carmen de Amar de la Torre y Bauzá
- 1068. María de las Mercedes Bosch y Bienert (February 26, 1917)
- 1069. María de la Concepción Fernández-Durán y Caballero
- 1070. Matilde Álvarez Moya
- 1071. Petronila Pombo y Escalante
- 1072. Luisa Marcotte de Quisiéres
- 1073. María Josefa Abella y Fuertes
- 1074. Julieta Verhaegen
- 1075. Princess Marie Louise of Orléans, princess Philip of the Two-Sicilies
- 1076. Ana María Méndez de Vigo y Méndez de Vigo
- 1077. María de Alzola y González de Castejón
- 1078. María del Carmen Rafaela de los Ríos y Enríquez
- 1079. María del Pilar de Carvajal y Hurtado de Mendoza
- 1080. Lady Irene Frances Adza Denison, Marchioness (consort) of Carisbrooke (Queen Victoria Eugenie's sister-in-law)
- 1081. Carolina de Carvajal y Quesada (February 4, 1919)
- 1082. María del Rosario de Vereterra y de Armada, 7th Marquise of Canillejas (February 24, 1919)
- 1083. María Teresa Parladé y Heredia, Dowager Marquise of Yanduri (February 24, 1919)
- 1084. María Josefa de Goyeneche y Gamio, 1st Duchess of Goyeneche, Countess of Gamio
- 1085. María de las Virtudes Martínez de Irujo y del Alcázar, Dowager Marquise de Lambertye-Gerbéviller (March 8, 1919)
- 1086. Leticia Bueno y Garzón, Countess of Agrela (March 29, 1919)
- 1087. Isidra Pons y Serra (March 29, 1919)
- 1088. María de las Mercedes de Sentmenat y Patiño, 1st Marquise of Santa Mori (March 29, 1919)
- 1089. María de Casanova y de Vallés, Marquise of Camps (March 29, 1919)
- 1090. Montserrat Desvalls y Amat (March 29, 1919)
- 1091. Natalia de Barandiarán y de las Bárcenas
- 1092. María de la Concepción de Santa Cruz y Navia-Osorio, 13th Marquise of Santa Cruz de Marcenado (June 2, 1919)
- 1093. María de las Mercedes Moltó y Rodríguez de Pérez Caballero (June 2, 1919)
- 1094. Infanta Beatriz of Spain, Princess of Citivella-Cesi (daughter of Alfonso XIII of Spain) (June 22, 1919)
- 1095. María de la Paz Olalla y Casasola, Dowager Countess of Hornachuelos (June 23, 1919)
- 1096. Hilaria Suari y Folch
- 1097. María de los Dolores Catarinéu y Ferrán
- 1098. SAS Princess Charlotte of Monaco, Duchess of Valentinois
- 1099. Carolina Bourgeois
- 1100. María Julia Elena Martínez de Hoz y Acevedo, Countess de los Llanos (March 8, 1920)
- 1101. María de los Dolores de Caries y de Ferrer
- 1102. Francisca Cornet y Enrich (August 3, 1920)
- 1103. Henriette Penon, wife of the Marshal of France, Joseph Joffre
- 1104. Ana Fernández de Henestrosa y Gayoso de los Cobos, Duchess of Medinaceli (April 18, 1921)
- 1105. Isabelle d'Oultremont, countess d'Oultremont, viscountess consort of Spoelberch
- 1106. Belle Layton Wyatt (July 11, 1912), wife of Joseph Edward Willard
- 1107. María Cristina de Borbón y Madán
- 1108. María de los Dolores de Cárcer y de Ros, 6th Baroness of Maldá y Maldanell (April 20, 1921)
- 1109. Princess Clara Eugenie of Bavaria (daughter of Infanta Amelia Philippina, 296th Dame and sister of Isabella of Bavaria, 612th Dame; niece of King-Consort Francis, Duke of Cádiz)
- 1110. Isabel de Lersundi y Blanco, 2nd Countess of Lersundi (1921)
- 1111. María de la Asunción de Vinuesa y Bessón, Countess of Castilfalé (December 26, 1921)
- 1112. Infanta Maria Cristina of Spain, countess of Marone (daughter of Alfonso XIII of Spain) (December 26, 1921)
- 1113. Augusta von Seefried auf Buttenheim, princess consorts of Bavaria (countess von Seefried auf Buttenheim)
- 1114. María de la Piedad Martínez de Irujo y Caro (February 13, 1922)
- 1115. Julia de Montaner y Malattó (February 13, 1922)
- 1116. María del Dulce Xifré y Chacón, 3rd Marquise of Isasi (March 27, 1922)
- 1117. María del Carmen Somonte y Basabe, Countess of Zubiría (March 27, 1922)
- 1118. María del Carmen de Zabálburu y Mazarredo, Countess of Heredia Spínola (March 27, 1922)
- 1119. María del Milagro Girona y Canaleta
- 1120. María de la Piedad de Iturbe y von Scholtz-Hermensdorff, princess consort of Hohenlohe-Langenburg
- 1121. María de la Concepción Kirkpatrick y O'Farrill, 5th Marquise de las Marismas del Guadalquivir (November 6, 1922)
- 1122. María del Carmen Angoloti y Mesa, Duchess de la Victoria (January, 1923)
- 1123. Princess María de las Mercedes of Bavaria, infanta of Spain, Princess Irakli Bagration of Mukhrani
  (daughter of Infanta Maria Teresa, princess of Bavaria, 845th Dame; granddaughter of Queen Maria Chritina, 805th Dame; niece of Princess Mercedes of Asturias, 816th Dame) (July 9, 1923)
- 1124. Francisca Ajuria y Temple
- 1125. Francisca O'Reilly y Pedroso, 5th Countess of Buenavista (10, 1923)
- 1126. Beatriz de León y de Loynaz
- 1127. María de la Aurora Ozores y Saavedra
- 1128. Isabel Balbo-Bertone di Sambuy
- 1129. Francesca Corsi Salviati
- 1130. María Dominga de Queralt y Fernández-Maquieira
- 1131. Joaquina Chacón y Silva
- 1132. Aldegonde Obert de Thieusies
- 1133. Marie de Hemricourt de Grünne
- 1134. María Blanca de Solís y Desmaissiéres
- 1135. María del Carmen Ferrer-Vidal y Soler, Dowager Marquise of Montsolís (July 10, 1923)
- 1136. María de las Mercedes Amat y Brugada
- 1137. María de las Mercedes Gómez de Uribarri, Dowager Marquise of Foronda (July 10, 1923)
- 1138. Josefina Fernández-Gayón y Barrie (July 10, 1923)
- 1139. Ana María de Urquiza y Catalá, Dowager Marquise of Valmediana (August 5, 1924)
- 1140. Virginia Lazzari di Gifflenga
- 1141. Isabel de Silva y Borchgrave
- 1142. María Clemencia Ramírez de Saavedra y Alfonso, 9th Marquise of Villasinda (December 10, 1924)
- 1143. María Teresa Núñez del Pino y Quiñones de León (December 10, 1924)
- 1144. Maria Maffei di Boglio, countess consort Bruschi-Falgari
- 1145. María de la Concepción Rodríguez García-Tagle (Concha Espina). (December 10, 1924)
- 1146. Isabel Nieulant y Altuna, 15th Marquise of Villamagna (January 25, 1925)
- 1147. María del Carmen San Gil y Ollo, Countess of Sobradiel (1925)
- 1148. María de la Ascensión Reynoso y Mateo (May 25, 1925)
- 1149. Virginia Woodbury y Lowery, Dowager Duchess of Arcos (August 26, 1925)
- 1150. Isabel Eugenia Ibarreta y Uhagón Vedia, Dowager Marquise of Valdeterrazo (August 26, 1925)
- 1151. María Luisa Gómez y Pelayo, 1st Marquise of Pelayo (December 14, 1925)
- 1152. Enriqueta de Borbón y Parade, 4th Duchess of Sevilla (February 20, 1926)
- 1153. María de la Asunción Isabel Martínez de Irujo y Caro, Duchess of Vistahermosa (May 3, 1926)
- 1154. Mary, Princess Royal and Countess of Harewood
- 1155. María Rivero y González, Dowager Marquise of Casa Domecq (August 9, 1926)
- 1156. Josefa Diosdado y Armero, 13th Marquise of Ángulo (April 13, 1927)
- 1157. Isabel de Heredia y Loring, Countess of Guadalhorce (April 13, 1927)
- 1158. María Antonia Atienza y Benjumea, Dowager Marquise of Valencia (April 13, 1927)
- 1159. María de la Concepción Loring y Heredia, Dowager Marquise de la Rambla (April 13, 1927)
- 1160. María Cristina Falcó y Álvarez de Toledo, 7th Countess of Frigiliana (May 23, 1927)
- 1161. María Isabel González de Olañeta e Ibarreta, Duchess of Montpensier
- 1162. Sofía Zamoyska, condesa Zamoyska
- 1163. Brígida Montis y Allendesalazar, Marquise of Linares (October 3, 1927)
- 1164. Princess Anne of Orléans, princess of France, Duchess Consort of Aosta
- 1165. María del Carmen de la Gándara y Lemery, Marquise de la Gándara (March 6, 1928)
- 1166. Princess Alice of Greece & Denmark (née Princess Alice of Battenberg, the Duke of Edinburgh's mother, 1st cousin of Queen Victoria Eugenie, 976th Dame)
- 1167. María del Carmen Pérez de Valdivielso y Torruella (July 17, 1928)
- 1168. Julia Schmidtlein y García-Teruel, Marquise of Bermejillo del Rey (July 17, 1928)
- 1169. María Felisa Esteban de León y Navarro de Balboa (1928)
- 1170. Queen Alexandrine of Denmark (née Duchess Alexandrine of Mecklenburg-Schwerin) (1929)
- 1171. Infanta María de las Mercedes, countess of Barcelona (Count of Barcelona's wife and Juan Carlos I of Spain's mother), née princess María de las Mercedes of Bourbon-Two Sicilies
- 1172. Infanta María de los Dolores of Bourbon-Two-Sicilies, princess Czartoryska (Countess of Barcelona's sister)
- 1173. Infanta María de la Esperanza of Two-Sicilies, princess of Orléans-Braganza (Countess of Barcelona's sister)
- 1174. Infanta Maria Carolina of Bourbon-Two-Sicilies, Countess Zamoyska
- 1175. María del Carmen Xifré y Chacón, 6th Countess of Campo Alegre
- 1176. María de las Mercedes Miralles de Villegas (1929)
- 1177. Manuela Ternero y Vázquez
- 1178. María Prieto de Odiaga
- 1179. Consuelo de Cubas y Erice, Countess of Santa María de la Sisla
- 1180. María de la Concepción Guzmán y O'Farrill, 4th countess of Vallellano
- 1181. María Inmaculada de Carvajal y Hurtado de Mendoza, Countess of Asalto
- 1182. María del Pilar Losada y Rosés, Marquise of Santa María de Barbará
- 1183. María de los Ángeles de Muguiro y Beruete, marchioness of Torrehermosa
- 1184. HIH Kikuko, Princess Takamatsu, née Kikuko, Princess Tokugawa
- 1185. María del Carmen Satrústegui y Barrie
- 1186. María Manuela Armada y de los Ríos-Enríquez, Marquise of Casa Valdés
- 1187. María Isabel Rodríguez-Valdés y Ferrán
- 1188. María de la Concepción Dahlander y Francés
- 1189. Camila Fabra y Puig
- 1190. María Buenaventura Bransí y Terrades
- 1191. Infanta Alicia of Spain, Duchess Dowager of Calabria, née princess Alicia of Parma
  (daughter-in-law of Princess Mercedes of Asturias, 816th Dame; mother of Carlos of Bourbon-Two-Sicilies, Infante of Spain, Duke of Calabria)
- 1192. Emmanuelle de Dampierre, Duchess Dowager of Anjou and Duchess of Segovia (daughter-in-law of king Alfonso XIII)
- 1193. Infanta Pilar, Duchess of Badajoz, Juan Carlos I of Spain's sister
- 1194. Infanta Margarita, Duchess of Soria y Hernani, Juan Carlos I of Spain's sister
- 1195. Queen Sofía of Spain (Juan Carlos I of Spain's wife), née Princess of Greece and Denmark. Last dame inducted.

== Bibliography ==
- Las Primeras Damas de la Orden de María Luisa. (in Spanish) About the women admitted into the order in its first year.
