= Hiera (disambiguation) =

Hiera is a genus of moths.

Hiera may also refer to:

- Hiera (mythology), a Greek mythological figure
- 7119 Hiera, a Jupiter trojan
- Hiera (Argolis), an island of ancient Argolis, Greece
- Hiera (Crete), a town of ancient Crete, Greece
- Hiera (Lesbos), a town of ancient Lesbos, Greece
- Hiera (Thera), one of the Cyclades, Greece
- Marettimo, the ancient Hiera Nesos, one of the Aegadian Islands, Italy

== See also ==
- Hiero (disambiguation)
