= Hiero of Syracuse =

Hiero of Syracuse may refer to:

- Hiero I of Syracuse, tyrant of Syracuse from 478 to 467 BC
- Hiero II of Syracuse, tyrant of Syracuse from 275 to 215 BC

== See also ==
- List of tyrants of Syracuse
- Hiero (disambiguation)
- Syracuse (disambiguation)
