= Iera =

Iera may refer to:

- Iera Echebarría, (born 1992) Spanish rugby player
- Iera (Lesbos), town on ancient Lesbos, Greece

== See also ==
- IERA
