= Hieros =

Hieros (ἱερός) is Greek for "holy" or "sacred". It may refer to:

- Ancient Greek religion

== See also ==
- Hiero (disambiguation)
- Hierapolis, a Hellenistic Greek city built on the site of a Phrygian cult center of the Anatolian mother goddess Cybele, in Phrygia in southwestern Anatolia
- Hierarch, an officer of a church or civic authority who by reason of office has ordinary power to execute laws
- Hierarchy, an arrangement of items that are represented as being "above", "below", or "at the same level as" one another
- Hieratic, a cursive writing system used for Ancient Egyptian
- Hierodeacon, a monk who has been ordained a deacon or deacon who has been tonsured monk in Eastern Orthodox Christianity
- Hierogamy, a sacred marriage that takes place between gods, especially when enacted in a symbolic ritual where human participants represent the deities
- Hieroglyph, the formal writing system used in Ancient Egypt for writing the Egyptian language
- Hieromonk, a person who is both monk and priest in the Eastern Christian tradition
- Hieronymus, the Latin form of the Ancient Greek name Ἱερώνυμος (Hierṓnymos), meaning "with a sacred name"
- Hierophant, a person who brings religious congregants into the presence of that which is deemed holy
- Hierophany, a manifestation of the sacred
- Hierophylakes, priests for the Eumolpidae involved in performing acts of sacrifice
- Hierotopy, the creation of sacred spaces viewed as a special form of human creativity and also a related academic field where specific examples of such creativity are studied
