= Hiero =

Hiero or hieron (/ˈhaɪərɒn/; Ancient Greek: ἱερόν, lit. "holy place" or "sacred place") is an ancient Greek shrine, temple, or temple precinct.

Hiero may also refer to:

== People ==
- Hiero I of Syracuse, tyrant of Syracuse, Sicily from 478 to 467 BC
- Hiero II of Syracuse, tyrant of Syracuse, Sicily from 275 to 215 BC
- Hieron (potter), a 5th-century BC potter associated with Makron (vase painter)
- Georg Hans Emmo Wolfgang Hieronymus (author abbrev.: Hiero.) (1846–1921), German botanist
- Jay Hieron (born 1976), American mixed martial artist

== Arts and entertainment ==
- Hiero (Xenophon), a dialogue by Xenophon
- Hiero Desteen, the protagonist and titular character of the novels Hiero's Journey and The Unforsaken Hiero

== Other uses ==
- Hieron (Caria), an ancient city and former bishopric Caria, Anatolia, which remains a Latin Catholic titular see Hieron
- A series of aircraft engines designed and manufactured by Otto Hieronimus, such as the Hiero 6
- Hieroglyphics (group), also known as Hiero, an American hip-hop group
- Hiéron du Val d'Or, a French esoteric Catholic secret society
- Hiero (project), an open-source distributed ledger technology
- Ptolemy's name for Carnsore Point, in Ireland.

== See also ==
- Hiera (disambiguation)
- Hieros (disambiguation)
