= Esperanza de Sarachaga =

19th-century courtier and socialite of Spanish and Russian descent

- Born: Doña Esperanza Felicitas Alexandra de Sarachaga y Lobanov Rostovsky; 7 July 1839; Saint Petersburg, Russian Empire
- Died: 28 January 1914 (aged 74)
- Noble family: Sarachaga
- Spouse: Friedrich Freiherr Truchseß von Wetzhause
- Father: Don Jorge de Sarachaga y Uría
- Mother: Princess Ekaterina Lobanov-Rostovskaya

Doña Esperanza Felicitas Alexandra de Sarachaga y Lobanov Rostovsky was a 19th-century courtier and socialite of Spanish and Russian descent. Born in St. Petersburg, she was informally known as “Spera”. She was the eldest daughter of Don Jorge de Sarachaga y Uría and his Russian wife Princess Ekaterina Lobanov-Rostovskaya. Her father, also known as Georg von Sarachaga-Uria (23 April 1811 – 14 December 1843) was born in Manzanares, Spain and killed near Mannheim in a duel. Esperanza married Bavarian diplomat, Friedrich Freiherr Truchseß von Wetzhausen.

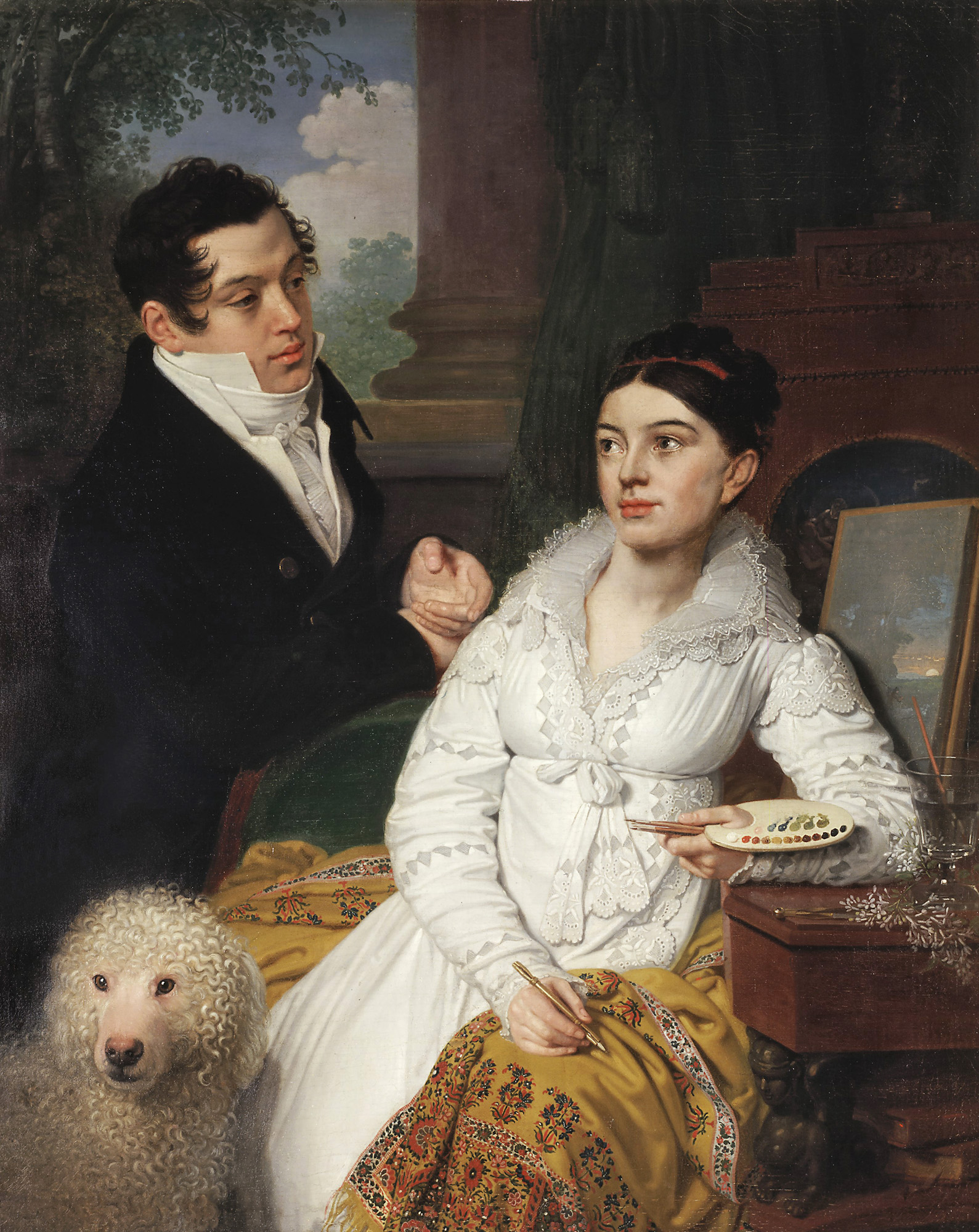
Esperanza's maternal grandparents, Prince Aleksei Lobanov-Rostovsky and his wife Countess Kucheleff.

== Family and childhood ==
Esperanza was a member of the Basque noble family of Sarachaga. The family belonged to the landed nobility, although in a publication by Prince Dolgokurov, who was in exile in France for falling out with the Russian Imperial family when he wrote this, they were referred to as of baronial rank, while the family never had a listing in the Almanach de Gotha's publications, whenever mentioned the family was referred to without hereditary title. Her paternal grandmother, Maria Micaela de Uria y Alcedo, who married Florentino de Sarachaga, had been a courtier during the Spanish reign of Joseph Bonaparte. She left Spain for Karlsruhe in 1813 with a Baden general in French service, Carl von Lasollaye, and accompanied by her children, one of whom became Spera's father Jorge. After the death of her husband who had been left behind in Spain, she married Lasollaye. Esperanza's mother was the eldest daughter of Russian Prince Aleksey Aleksandrovich Lobanov-Rostovsky and his wife Countess Alexandra Grigorievna Kucheleff. Doña Esperanza's father and mother met in St. Petersburg as children, although he eventually joined the military service in Baden. Esperanza would later write that her childhood was happy, but that it was also very sad because by the time she was almost ten years old she had lost both her parents and her grandfather. When Esperanza was six years old, she and her brother inherited her father's fortune upon his death in a duel with Moritz von Haber in 1843. Haber was a Jewish banker who, according to a group of aristocratic army officers to which Jorge belonged, had an undue influence on the Grand Ducal house. A series of duels followed, in the final one of which Jorge was a victim. After his death, Esperanza and her brother were placed under the guardianship of their maternal grandparents, Prince and Princess Lobanov-Rostovsky. Her grandmother died in Paris during the French Revolution of 1848, and Esperanza was sent to be brought up in St. Petersburg away from her brother Alexis. She was summoned to and joined the Russian imperial court at the age of sixteen. She and her brother spent their childhood apart between Russia, France, Norway, and Spain. Alexis, together with the Jesuit Victor Drevon, later became the founder of the Hiéron du Val d'Or, a Roman Catholic esoteric political cabal that sought to prepare the political landscape in Europe for the second coming and reign of Christ. They also founded the Musée du Hiéron

== Marriage ==
Doña Esperanza wed Bavarian diplomat Friedrich Freiherr Truchseß von Wetzhausen on 15 July 1862. Esperanza first met Wetzhausen when he was working as a diplomat at the Russian court, and they were married soon after. During their marriage she often took him back to Bilbao, Spain, to visit her family. Once, when they were newly-wed, she took her new husband on a long hiking trip in Spain where they came upon a beautiful country palace. Her husband loved it and said that he wanted to know more about the owners because he was going to buy it for her. The gardener was the one to reveal to him that Esperanza was the owner all along. Philipp, Prince of Eulenburg, commented that Esperanza was considered, at age 44, to have beauty, generosity and intelligence. Esperanza died in Cannes, France, on January 28, 1914.

== Diplomacy and politics ==
As a courtier she had friends in many circles. Sometimes her friends had loyalties to governments in conflict with each other. Philipp zu Eulenburg-Hertefeld relays that when Esperanza found out that King Ludwig II of Bavaria was about to be institutionalized for mental illness, she attacked the commission that came to get him at the entrance to Hohenschwangau Castle, protesting and flailing at the men with her umbrella. She then rushed to the king's apartments to identify the conspirators. Ludwig had the commissioners arrested, but after holding them captive for several hours, released them, and was taken into their custody.

== Charitable work ==
Esperanza founded many charitable institutions, including a Bavarian Kindergarten and "Friedrichsheim", a Bavarian elder care home in Stadtlauringen named after her husband. She was also a benefactress of her brother's legacy, the Musée du Hiéron.

== See also ==
- Ludwig II of Bavaria
