= Hiéron du Val d'Or =

Catholic esoteric secret society in France

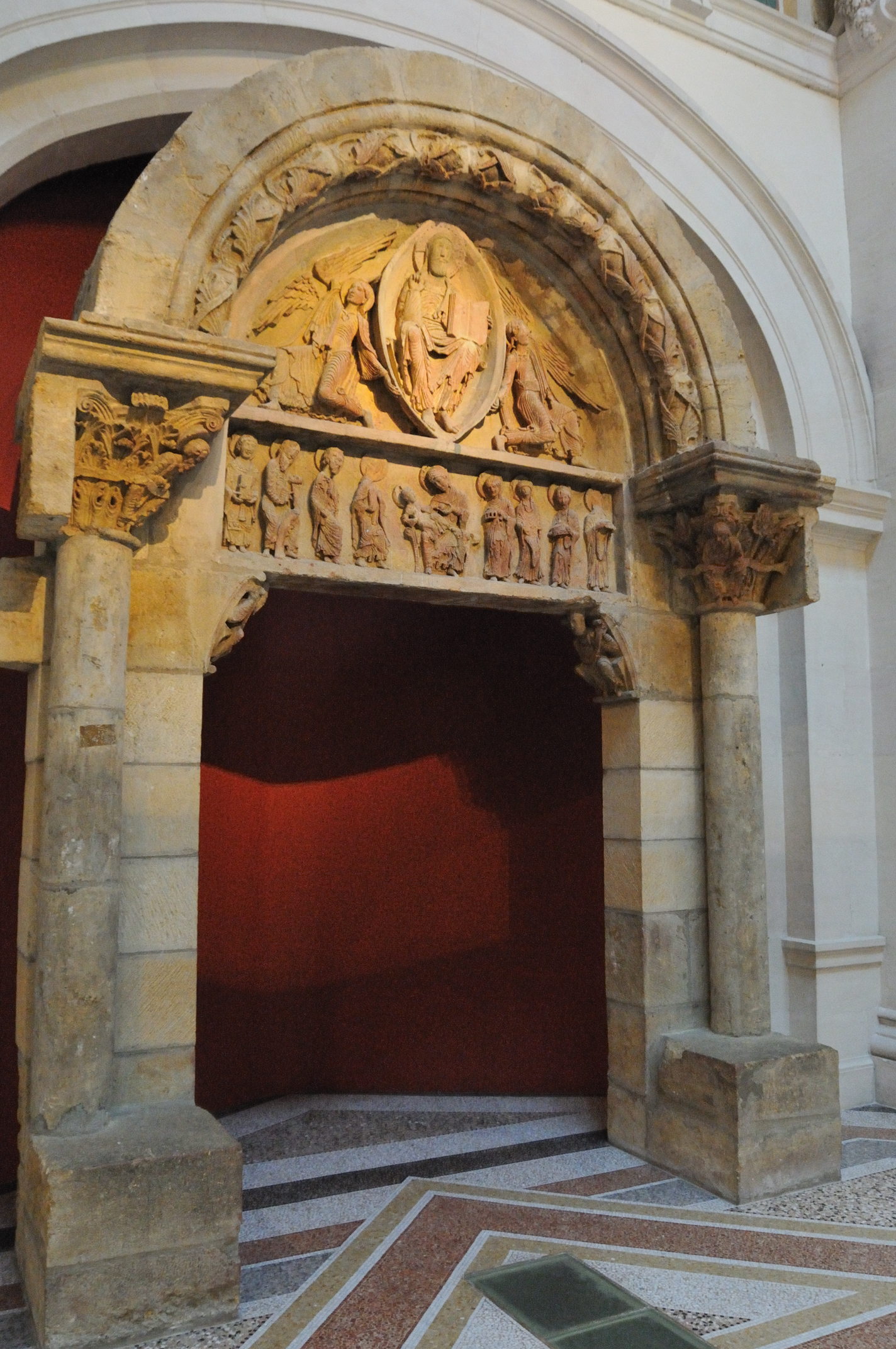
Musée du Hiéron

The Hiéron du Val d'Or (English: "Sanctuary of the Golden Valley") was a Catholic esoteric secret society in France, which existed from 1873 until 1926. It was founded by a Jesuit Victor Drevon and the half-Spanish, half-Russian Alexis de Sarachaga. It was allied to concepts of royalism and was culturally conservative; it sought to erect a Catholic hermetic freemasonry, contrary to the anti-clerical freemasonry of Grand Orient de France and was particularly devoted to Christ the King.

== History ==
The group was founded in 1873 near the shrine at Paray-le-Monial, historical Burgundy, where St. Marguerite-Marie Alacoque had visions of the Sacred Heart of Jesus, establishing the popular devotion. The area was popular in France as a pilgrimage destination, due to these connections. The Hiéron developed a museum and research center in 1877, which still exists to this day as the Musée du Hiéron. The building itself incorporated geometrical symbolism similar to that used within other Hermetic Christian settings. The Hiéron attempted to demonstrate the origins of Christianity in the mystical Atlantis, worked to prepare the way for the social political reign of Christ the King in the year 2000 and devoted themselves to the name aor-agni ("light-fire").

Following the death of de Sarachaga in 1918, Georges Gabriel de Noaillat and his wife Marthe Devuns de Noaillat stayed at Paray and continued on the work of the Hiéron. They sought to downplay some of the more unorthodox aspects of the Hiéron's mysticism and comply closer to Catholic orthodoxy. In particular, they pushed hard for the recognition of the Feast of Christ the King, which in 1925 was instituted by Pope Pius XI with the encyclical Quas primas. After the death of the de Noaillats and their collaborator Jeanne Lépine-Authelain in 1926, the Hiéron essentially came to an end. However, the building itself still stands and remains to this day as a museum displaying Catholic sacred art.

In 1921, the Missionary Oblates of Mary Immaculate priest Fr. Félix Anizan founded the Regnabit: The Universal Review of the Sacred Heart journal. This publication featured a wider array of Paray-associated Catholic writers than just Hiéron and was approved by the Catholic hierarchy in France. However, Georges Gabriel de Noaillat was among the first contributors to the journal. Another contributor was the historian Louis Charbonneau-Lassay who drew in the traditionalist philosopher René Guénon to contribute. Originally a Martinist, Guénon eventually moved towards Sufism of Islam and was a key figure in the Traditionalist School. One of the collaborators of the de Naoillats; Jeanne Lépine-Authelain; corresponded with the esotericist Paul Le Cour who displayed an interest in the Hiéron's claims about Atlantis. Le Cour inherited de Sarachaga's gold ring and some see him as a successor, "in spirit", at least. Le Cour would go on to become a precursor to the New Age movement, with his 1937 work The Age of Aquarius.

== Symbolism ==
The Hiéron du Val d'Or held significance of certain images or dates such as the octopus which stood for the inconsistency of man while The Sacred Heart stands for an abyss of constancy and fidelity. Each of these symbols were identified in the Secret Files of Henri Lobineau (doc 6) titled "The Hieron of Val d'Or" dated February 5 or 6 and June 24.

== See also ==
- Esperanza de Sarachaga — sister of Alexis de Sarachaga
- Priory of Sion — Pierre Plantard's fraternity
- Sédir — founder of Les Amitiés Spirituelles
- Paul Vulliaud — founder of Les entretiens idéalistes
- Sodalitium Pianum — anti-modernist intelligence network
- Secret society
