= Louise Mitchell Meredith Read, Marchioness of Tomar =

British woman who became a Portuguese noble

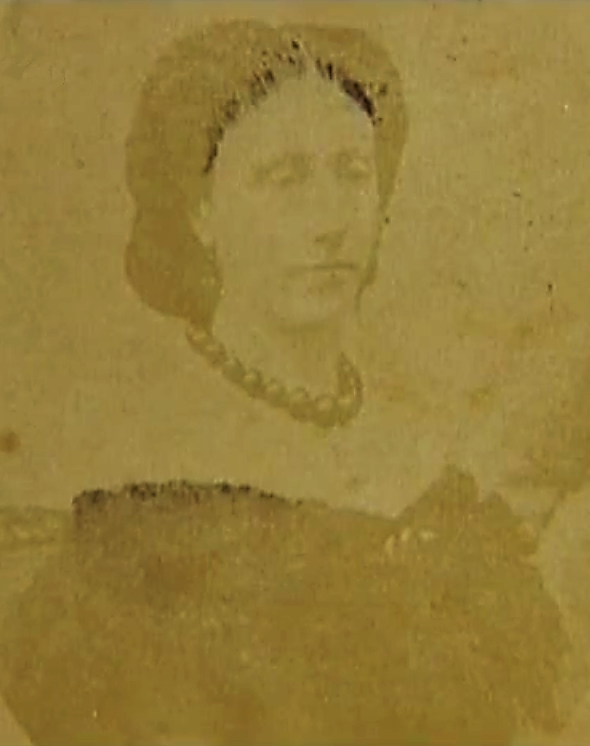
- Born: Louise Mitchell Meredith Read; 11 September 1816; Portsmouth, England
- Died: 5 February 1885 (Aged 68); Rome, Italy
- Known for: Wife of António Bernardo da Costa Cabral, 1st Marquis of Tomar

Louise Mitchell Meredith Read (1816-1885) was the British wife of António Bernardo da Costa Cabral, 1st Marquis of Tomar, an important Portuguese politician in the 19th century and prime minister of Portugal in the 1840s.

== Early life ==
Louise Mitchell Meredith Read (1816 – 1885) was born in Portsmouth, England on 11 September 1816. She was the daughter of John Read, a distant relation of George Read, one of the signatories to the Declaration of Independence of the United States, and of Louise Mitchell Meredith. Encountering business difficulties that bankrupted him, her father turned for assistance to his brother, William Harding Read. He was the affluent British consul-general in Ponta Delgada on São Miguel Island in the Azores archipelago of Portugal and appointed his brother as vice-consul. On the voyage to the Azores, John Read's ship was wrecked and all hands were lost. This left the mother of Louise Read penniless and William Read again came to assistance by moving her and her three children to the Azores and looking after them. He and her mother would eventually marry.

== Marriage to Costa Cabral ==
During the Portuguese Civil War (1828–34) between the supporters of the two brothers Dom Pedro and Dom Miguel, Costa Cabral was a left-wing supporter of the liberal Pedro, who had set up a Government-in-Exile in the Azores. Visiting the Azores as a judge of the Court of Appeal, Costa Cabral was invited to the British Consul's home, where he met Louise Read. They married in August 1834. They were to have five children, with the four boys playing important roles in Portuguese history.

== Rise into the nobility ==
Read's husband was soon to lead Liberal forces in the crushing of a Miguelista rebellion in the Azores. This gave him sufficient prestige to be elected to the Portuguese parliament, representing the Azores, and the couple and their young son left for Lisbon in 1835. In 1838, Cabral was appointed General Administrator of Lisbon. In the same year, following the nationalisation of the assets of religious orders in Portugal, he purchased part of the Convento de Cristo in Tomar, which he turned into an important mansion. Their prestige continued to grow and in 1840 Queen Maria II and King Ferdinand II agreed to be their third child's godparents. In five years, Read, at the age of 24, had made the transition from being a young English girl in Portugal with an uncertain future to a hostess of Portuguese royalty and nobility. However, she did have some concerns, as there were rumours that her husband was having an affair with the Queen and there were also frequent attacks in the press alleging corruption by her husband.

== Travels ==
Costa Cabral was prime minister from 1842 to 1846. However, in 1846, a famine caused a popular uprising known as the Revolution of Maria da Fonte. This caused Costa Cabral to flee to Spain and, shortly after, his wife and four children joined him in Madrid. The government then appointed him ambassador to Madrid and their last son was born in that city. They returned to Lisbon in 1849 and her husband was prime minister again until 1851, but he never achieved the same power that he had earlier. In 1859, he went with his family to be ambassador to Brazil, staying only two years. They then effectively retired to Tomar, where Read planted grapes, recruited an oenologist from France, and produced a high-quality wine. In 1870, Costa Cabral was appointed as Portugal's ambassador to the Holy See in Rome, at that time the country's most prestigious diplomatic appointment.

== Death ==
Louise Mitchell Meredith Read, Marchioness of Tomar died in Rome on 5 February 1885.
