= Hiera (Lesbos) =

Ancient town in Lesbos

Coordinates: 39°03′18″N 26°29′22″E

Hiera (Ancient Greek: Ἱερά), also known as Iera or Ira (Ίρα), was a town of ancient Lesbos.

The site of Hiera is located near modern Perama.
