= Louis Auguste Say =

French economist (1774–1840)

- Born: 9 March 1774; Lyon, France
- Died: 6 May 1840 (aged 66); Paris, France
- Occupations: Businessman, economist
- Spouse: Constance Maressal
- Children: Gustave Say; Achille Say; Constant Say; Louis Octave Say
- Parent(s): Jean Étienne Say; Françoise Brun de Castanet
- Relatives: Jean-Baptiste Say (brother); Horace Say (nephew); François de Cossé Brissac, 11th Duke of Brissac (grandson); Princess Marie Say (granddaughter); Léon Say (grandnephew)

Louis Auguste Say (9 March 1774 in Lyon – 6 March 1840 in Paris) was a French businessman and economist. He founded large sugar refineries in Nantes and Paris, and the sugar company "Say", known after 1972 as Béghin-Say; as of 2002 it is a subsidiary of Tereos.

== Early life and family background ==
Say was born on 6 March 1774 in Lyon, France. His father, Jean-Etienne Say, was a Swiss-born silk trader. His mother was Françoise Brun de Castanet. He had a brother, Jean-Baptiste Say, who later became a classical liberal economist.

His paternal family were Protestants from Nîmes who were exiled in Geneva, Switzerland after the repeal of the Revocation of the Edict of Nantes in 1685. His paternal great-grandfather, also named Louis Say, moved first to Amsterdam, where he was a member of the Walloon Church, before settling in Geneva in 1694. His paternal grandfather, Jean Say, became a Swiss citizen.

== Business career ==
Say began his career as a broker in Paris. He then moved to Abbeville, where he worked in the calico-whitening industry.

In 1813, Say asked Jules Paul Benjamin Delessert to recommend his cousin, Armand Delessert, who was the owner of a beetroot sugar refinery in Nantes. Shortly after, Say moved to Nantes and took over the refinery. After the government changed the law on tariffs in 1814, Say switched to using sugarcane in 1815. He later let his son Horace taken over the refinery. The company was known as Louis Say et Cie, later known as Béghin-Say, now a subsidiary of Tereos.

In 1832, with Constant Duméril, Say also opened a beetroot sugar factory in Ivry-sur-Seine, known as the "Raffinerie de Jamaïque" (English: "refinery from Jamaica").

== Writings on economics ==
Partly in reaction to his brother, Say became an economist at the age of forty-four, after he had become wealthy. For historian Marc Penouil, he was an "amateur" in this field.

Say joined the Société Académique de Loire-Inférieure. He also met David Ricardo in England. He wrote four books about political economy between 1818 and 1836. He disagreed with his brother, Jean-Baptiste, about classical liberalism. Say focused on the relationship between worth and usefulness. He drew distinctions between national wealth and individual wealth. Contrary to classical liberals, he was in favour of tariffs as a way to encourage production. However, he was vehemently opposed to taxes.

== Personal life and death ==
Say married Constance Maressal in 1809. They had four sons: Gustave, Achille, Constant, and Louis Octave Say.

Say died on 6 May 1840 in Paris. He was sixty-six years old.

== Legacy ==
Say's nephew, Horace Say, became a classical liberal economist. His grandnephew, Léon Say, served as the French Minister of Finance from 1872 to 1873, 1875 to 1877, 1877 to 1879, and again in 1882. His granddaughter, Princess Marie Say married first Henri Amédée de Broglie, and later Infante Luis Fernando of Spain.

== Works ==
- Les principales causes de la richesse ou de la misère des peuples et des particuliers (1818).
- Considérations sur l'industrie et la législation sous le rapport de leur influence sur la richesse des États et examen critique des principaux ouvrages qui ont paru sur l'économie politique (1822).
- Traité élémentaire de la richesse individuelle et de la richesse publique, et éclaircissement sur les principales questions d'économie politique (1827).
- Étude sur la richesse des nations et réfutation des principales erreurs en économie politique (1836).
