= Andrés Freire Conde =

Spanish Army general and painter (1927–2020)

- Born: 22 November 1927; A Graña naval base, Ferrol, Spain
- Died: 17 April 2020 (aged 92); A Coruña, Spain
- Citizenship: Spanish
- Education: University of Santiago de Compostela
- Spouse: Esclavitud "Tutú" García Cidón
- Military career
- Allegiance: Spain
- Branch: Spanish Army (Artillery)
- Rank: Lieutenant general
- Commands: Captain General of Levante (1988–1991)
- Website: afreireart.com

Andrés Freire Conde (22 November 1927 – 17 April 2020) was a Spanish Army artillery officer who rose to the rank of lieutenant general and served as Captain General of the Levante Military Region from 1988 to 1991. He was also a self-taught painter and watercolourist known for his marker drawings of the historic centres of Santiago de Compostela, Pontevedra and other Galician towns.

== Early life ==
Freire Conde was born in 1927 at the A Graña naval base in Ferrol, where his father was stationed, and spent his childhood in the city. He graduated in law and later qualified as a General Staff officer.

== Military career ==
Commissioned in the Artillery, he returned to Ferrol in 1981 as colonel in command of an artillery regiment. As a brigadier general he was posted to the Army General Staff in November 1984. He was promoted to major general in August 1986 and appointed military governor of the province of Lleida that November.

In June 1988 he was promoted to lieutenant general, and on 20 July 1988 he was named Captain General of the Third Military Region (Levante). The post also made him Juez Protector of the Real Maestranza de Caballería de Valencia; he held it until 1991, when he was succeeded by Agustín Quesada Gómez. His military career ended in Valencia in 1991.

== Art ==
Freire was self-taught and worked from life, drawing outdoors with a pen and later with a felt-tip marker, and painting watercolours in a sketchbook rather than at an easel. His subjects were mainly streets, squares and monuments in Galicia and in the places he was posted.

His first exhibition was in Ronda in 1959, followed by shows in Santiago de Compostela (1971), Vigo (1976), Betanzos and A Coruña (1978), Ferrol (1984) and Valencia (1992). The 1978 Betanzos exhibition showed more than thirty works, nearly all of which sold. His series Compostela Monumental was exhibited at the Casa de Galicia in Madrid in 1993 and reviewed by Xosé Filgueira Valverde; Pontevedra Monumental followed in Pontevedra (2006) and Madrid (2009). In 2004 he exhibited 21 watercolours of Caldas de Reis, his wife's home town. At 91 he revived Compostela Monumental at the Casa do Cabildo in Santiago in May 2019.

Posthumous exhibitions were held at the Museo das Mariñas in Betanzos (2024–2025) and the Sala Bello Piñeiro in Ferrol (2025). His family is preparing an anthology of his work for his centenary in 2027.

== Personal life ==
He married Esclavitud “Tutú” García Cidón, a native of Caldas de Reis, at the town's parish church of Santo Tomás. Several of their children were born there. He died in A Coruña in April 2020.
