= Maestranza de caballería =

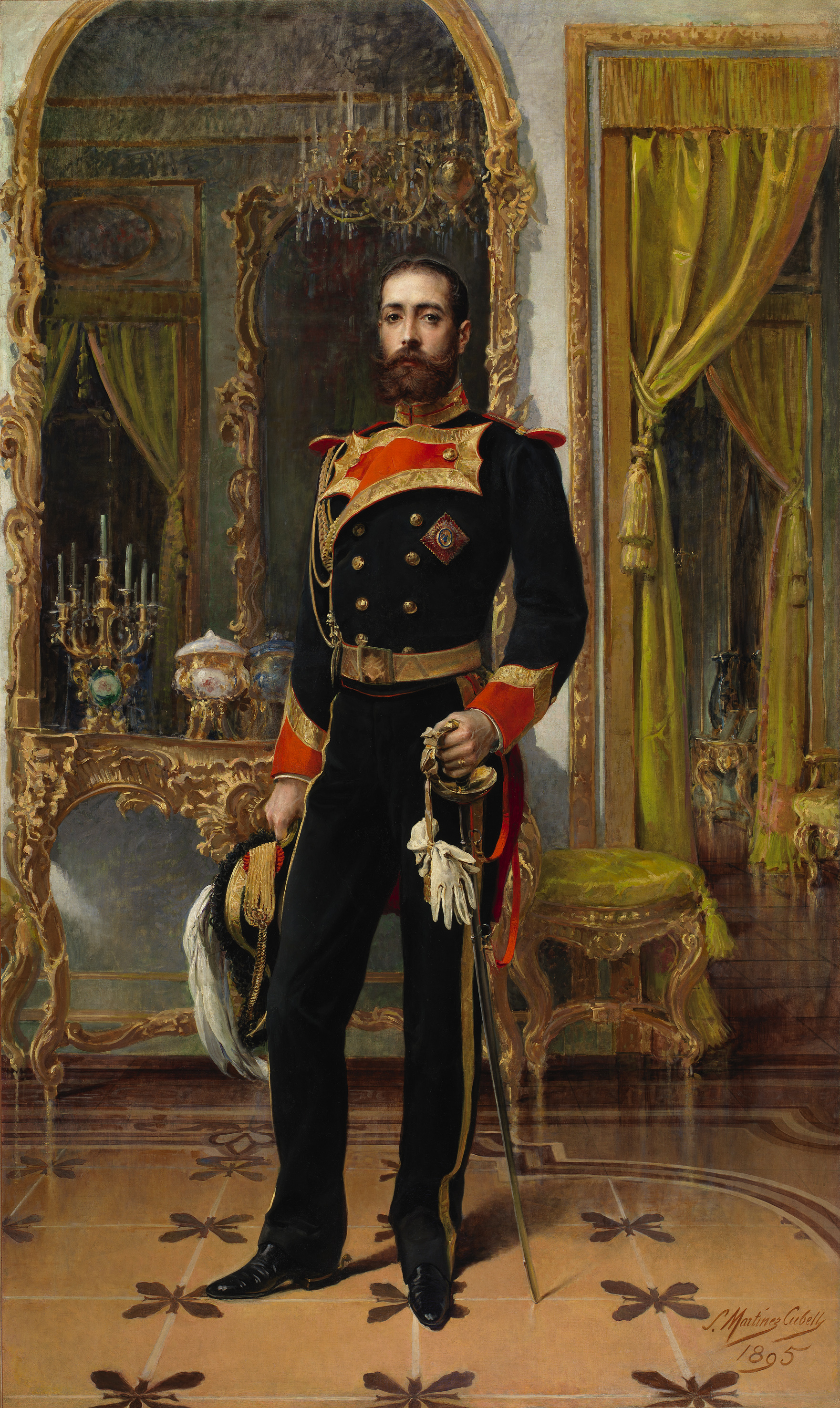
Portrait of the Marquess of Vistabella in the uniform of the Real Maestranza de Caballería de Ronda, 1895

Maestranzas de caballería (literally translated as 'cavalry armories') are noble militias created in the early modern era by the Spanish Crown, with the aim of giving the nobility practice in horsemanship and the use of weapons. In the sixteenth century, the caballería (cavalry) was the typical military branch for nobles to follow, but the aforementioned skills had become less common as the Spanish aristocracy converted into a class of courtiers. These noble institutions created a dedicated cavalry corps that was directly funded by its members. The participating nobles, or maestrantes, organized themselves under the advocacy of a holy patron and took the internal form of a confraternity.

== Traditional maestranzas ==
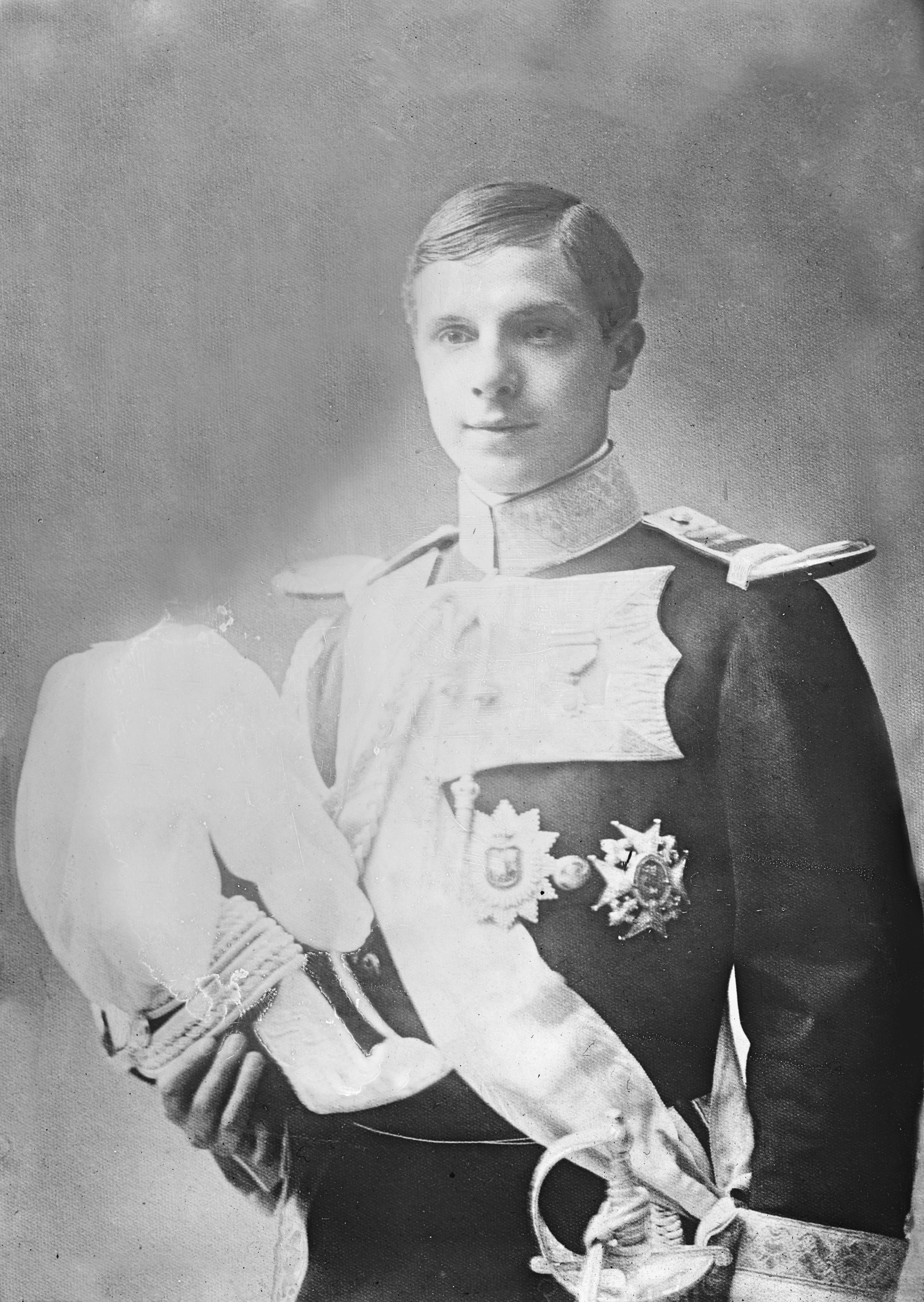
Infante Luis Fernando de Orléans wearing the uniform of the Real Maestranza de Caballería de Granada, c. 1910

Philip II of Spain issued a Royal Decree on September 6, in which he encouraged the distinct local nobilities to organize themselves into noble brotherhoods. On August 3, 1573, the nobility of Ronda created the Hermandad del Santo Espíritu under the advocacy of Nuestra Señora de Gracia ('Our Lady of Grace'), which would later become the Real Maestranza de Caballería de Ronda.

Seville created a fraternity in the name of its patron saint, Saint Hermengild, soon thereafter, though it dissolved rapidly. By 1670, a group of nobles took Nuestra Señora del Rosario ('Our Lady of the Rosary') as its patron saint and the following year drew up orders which would give rise to the Real Maestranza de Caballería de Sevilla from that time forward.

Nuestra Señora del Triunfo ('Our Lady of the Triumph') became the patroness of the Real Maestranza de Caballería de Granada, created in 1686 to imitate its Sevillian counterpart. Four years later, another of the modern-era maestranzas was formed – the Real Maestranza de Caballería de Valencia.

Other traditional maestranzas of cavalry include the Real Maestranza de Caballería de Zaragoza, created in 1819 from the old Cofradía de Caballeros Hijosdalgo de San Jorge, and the Maestranza de Caballería de Segovia (Castilla) that was established around 1808 and reorganized between 1990 and 1992 under the auspices and protection of the Count of Barcelona, Don Juan Carlos Teresa Silverio Alfonso de Borbón y Battenberg, father of King Juan Carlos I.

In 2016, King Felipe VI awarded the Corbata of the Royal Order of Isabel la Católica to the Maestranza de Caballería de Castilla.

== Disbanded maestranzas ==
Historians are certain of the existence of several maestranzas in different Spanish cities. Their decay and disappearance were due to a range of factors, including the prohibition of the use of small firearms, abandonment of old customs and accoutrements consistent with the jineta riding style and the decline of the equine trade in the south of Spain, etc.

In 1728, a petition was sent to the Spanish King by the city of Carmona, which acknowledged the existence of a Maestranza de Carmona. It would be governed from 1732 onwards under the auspices of the Real Maestranza de Caballería de Sevilla.

Also in 1728, Philip V of Spain responded affirmatively to a memorial presented by the horsemen Diego Chacón y Rojas and his son Juan with the intention of reorganizing the Maestranza de Antequera. This maestranza was also governed by the rules of the Sevillian group.

Three years later, a series of horsemen asked the Crown to form the Maestranza de Jaén, but the Council of the Kingdom's Cavalry declined the request. The same case occurred with the Maestranza de Utrera in 1732.

Conversely, in 1739, the Council of Caballería ruled in favor of the creation of the Maestranza de Jerez de la Frontera. Finally, in 1758 a request was submitted for a Maestranza de Palma de Mallorca. The request was approved, and the henceforth guild has governed itself with its own bylaws.

== Maestranzas in the Americas ==
The Real Maestranza de Caballería de La Habana (Havana) was created by inspiration of the Sevillian Don Laureano de Torres Ayala (1649-1725), Knight of the Order of Santiago and Marquis of Casa Torres. Illustrious Havana and Spanish aldermen participated in its constitution, adopting the ordinances of Seville. It was approved by King Philip V of Spain, by Royal Decree of August 26, 1713. Although it is a little known matter, the monarch approved the Real Maestranza in order to help the always difficult defense of Cuba and the Spanish Antilles from the continuous corsair attacks, in a period of turbulence caused by the War of the Peninsular Succession and the threats of English invasion.

In imitation of the metropolitan situation and probably due to the influence of the Cuban case, on the occasion of the festivities held in Mexico in 1789 to celebrate the proclamation of Charles IV of Spain, a group of 31 New Spanish knights, some members of the already existing maestranzas, with the support of the Viceroy Juan Vicente de Güemes, 2nd Count of Revilla Gigedo, requested royal authorization to create the Real Maestranza de Caballería de México. They raised an instance, on February 3, 1790. The initiative was disavowed by the Council of the Indies due to the distrust caused by any type of autonomous organization of the American nobility due to the danger of fostering a possible seed for independence.

== Emblems ==
Ronda (1572)

Seville (1670)

Granada (1686)

Valencia (1690)

Havana (1709)

Zaragoza (1819)

Castile (1992)

Saint Ferdinand (1999)
