= Infante Luis Fernando of Spain =

Spanish prince (1888–1945)

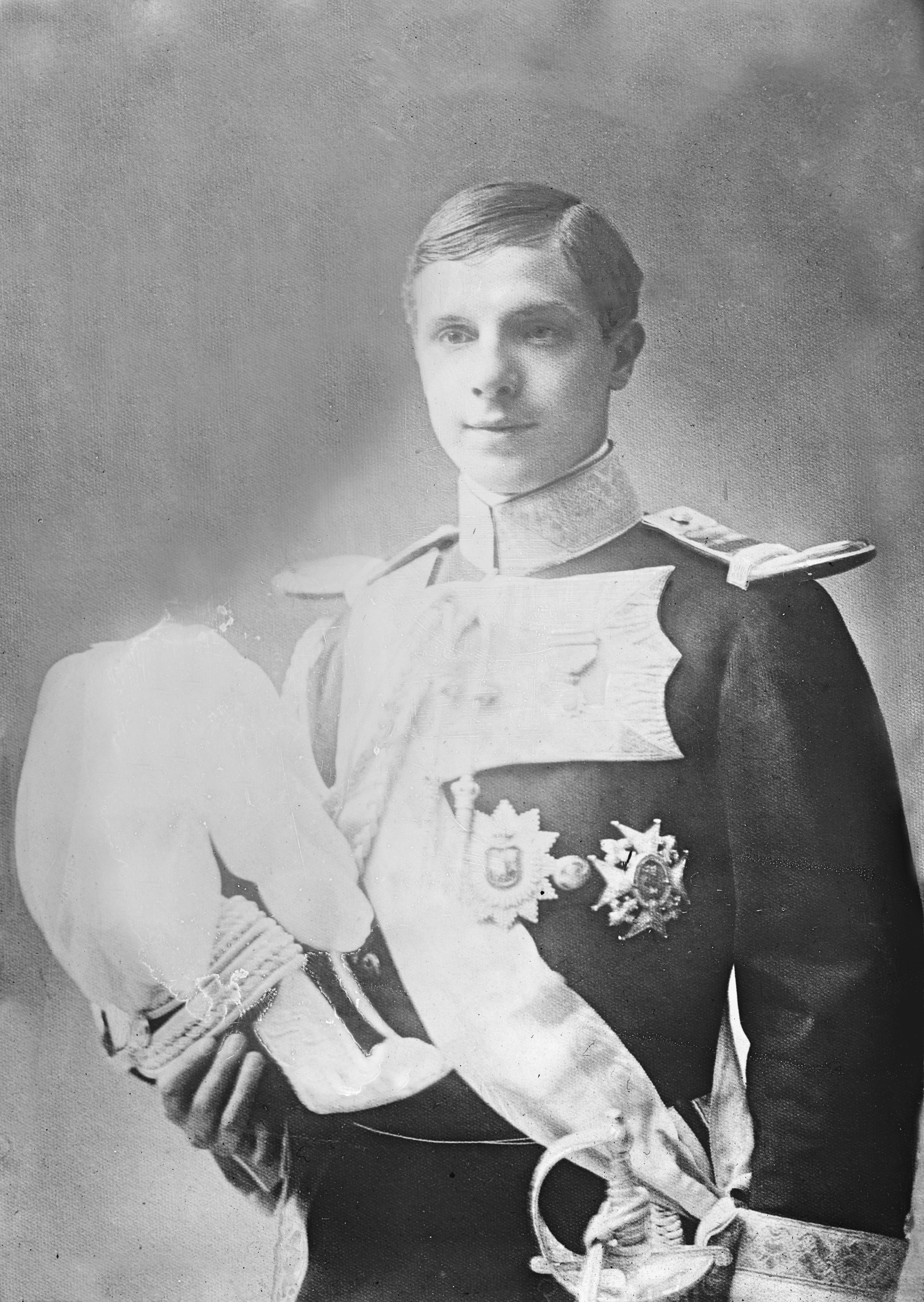
- Photographed in uniform of the Real Maestranza de Caballería de Granada, ca. 1910
- Born: 5 November 1888; Madrid, Spain
- Died: 20 June 1945 (aged 56); Paris, France
- Burial: Église du Cœur Immaculé de Marie
- Spouse: Marie Say (m. 1930; died 1943)
Names
- Luis Fernando María Zacarías
- House: Orléans-Galliera
- Father: Infante Antonio, Duke of Galliera
- Mother: Infanta Eulalia of Spain

Luis Fernando de Orleans y Borbón, Infante of Spain (5 November 1888 – 20 June 1945) was a French prince and Spanish infante who lost his title.

== Biography ==
=== Early life and education ===
Luis Fernando was born in Madrid, the younger son of Infante Antonio, Duke of Galliera and of his wife, Infanta Eulalia of Spain.

In 1899 Luis Fernando and his older brother Alfonso were sent to England to be educated by the Jesuits at Beaumont College. They remained there until 1904.

Elisabeth de Gramont, Duchess of Clermont-Tonnerre, who chronicled various aspects of Parisian life in her four-volume memoirs, wrote about him: "The Infante was certainly the most divertingly cynical little creature who ever amused Paris. Slim, pallid, round- and restless-eyed like a bird, sullen looking, with lovely hands like those of a Coëllo Infanta, he promenaded his lubricious little royal person from drawing-room to awful bouges and then, ingratiatingly and affectionately, he would sink like an abandoned child at the feet of some 'Good Dame' and lament his lot."

=== Marriage rumors and exile ===
On 17 July 1914 The New York Times reported the marriage of Luis Fernando to Beatrice Harrington. The newspaper was mistaken, however; the groom was actually Don Luis de Borbón, Duke of Ansola.

On 10 October 1924 Luis Fernando was expelled from France. He was purportedly involved in the trade of illegal drugs. In response, King Alfonso XIII of Spain deprived him of his privileges as an Infante of Spain: "In response to the conduct observed by D. Luis Fernando María Zacarías of Orleans and Bourbon which does not allow him to bear with dignity the honours and favors that by Me have been granted upon him... I hereby decree the following: D. Luis Fernando María Zacarías of Orleans and Bourbon is deprived of the prerogatives, honours and other distinctions corresponding to the condition of Infante of Spain that were granted upon him by Royal Decree dated on 4 November 1888".

Unable to reside either in Spain or France, Luis Fernando moved to Lisbon. On 24 March 1926 he was arrested at the Portuguese-Spanish border at Algarve, disguised as a woman. Some smuggled goods were found in his possession, but no drugs. In 1927 he allegedly travelled to Italy in the company of Portuguese poet António Botto.

In 1929 it was reported that Luis Fernando was engaged to Mabelle Gilman Corey, a Broadway actress and the former wife of William E. Corey, a steel magnate. The marriage never took place.

=== Marriage ===
In July 1930 an engagement was announced between Luis Fernando and Marie Constance Charlotte Say (25 August 1857, Verrières-le-Buisson - 15 July 1943, Paris), granddaughter of Louis Auguste Say and widow of Prince Henri Amédée de Broglie and the owner of the Château de Chaumont. Luis Fernando was 41 years old, while Marie was 72 years old.

Marie's nephew, François de Cossé, 11th Duke of Brissac, brought a lawsuit on behalf of her family before the Tribunal de grande instance of the Seine to try to stop the wedding. He claimed that his aunt was mentally incompetent. Marie claimed that she had thought about the marriage twelve years earlier, but had delayed on account of her grandchildren. The court determined that a nephew had no legal right to oppose the marriage of an aunt. It appointed a commission of three doctors to investigate Marie's mental state and confirmed a judicial administrator appointed on 7 July to manage Marie's estate.

On 19 September 1930 Luis Fernando and Marie married in a civil ceremony in a London registry office. On 4 October 1930 they were married in a religious ceremony in the Cathedral of San Siro in Sanremo on the Italian Riviera. After their wedding Luis Fernando and Marie lived in Sanremo in a house given to Luis Fernando by his mother. In February 1935 Luis Fernando was again expelled from France. He had been arrested in a vice squad raid.

Luis Fernando's wife Marie died in 1943. He spent the next two years in a Paris nursing home where he died in 1945. He is buried at the Église du Cœur Immaculé de Marie, 51bis rue de la Pompe, in Paris.

== Legacy ==
Two books about Luis Fernando have been published. El infante maldito and Rey de las Maricas (The King of Queers, a title he used in jest after his official titles were removed). Both were written by Jose Carlos Garcia Rodriguez. Another related book, Los fantasmas de Eulalia by José Infante, reviews his mother's feelings toward her youngest son's sexuality. Infante writes that despite Eulalia's liberal views, especially with regard to female independence, she handled him cruelly.

== Arms ==
Heraldry of Luis Fernando of Orleans

Coat of arms as Infante of Spain
Until 1924

Coat of arms after the royal title and decorations were stripped
1924-1945

== Ancestry ==
Ancestors of Infante Luis Fernando of Spain

8. Louis Philippe I of France
4. Prince Antoine, Duke of Montpensier
9. Princess Maria Amalia of Naples and Sicily
2. Infante Antonio, Duke of Galliera
10. Ferdinand VII of Spain
5. Infanta Luisa Fernanda of Spain
11. Princess Maria Cristina of the Two Sicilies
1. Luis Fernando de Orleans y Borbón
12. Infante Francisco de Paula of Spain
6. Infante Francisco de Asís of Spain
13. Princess Luisa Carlotta of the Two Sicilies
3. Infanta María Eulalia of Spain
14. Ferdinand VII of Spain (= 10)
7. Isabella II of Spain
15. Princess Maria Cristina of the Two Sicilies (= 11)
