= Marie Say =

French heiress and socialite (1857–1943)

- Princess Henri Amédée de Broglie; Princess Luis Fernando of Orléans
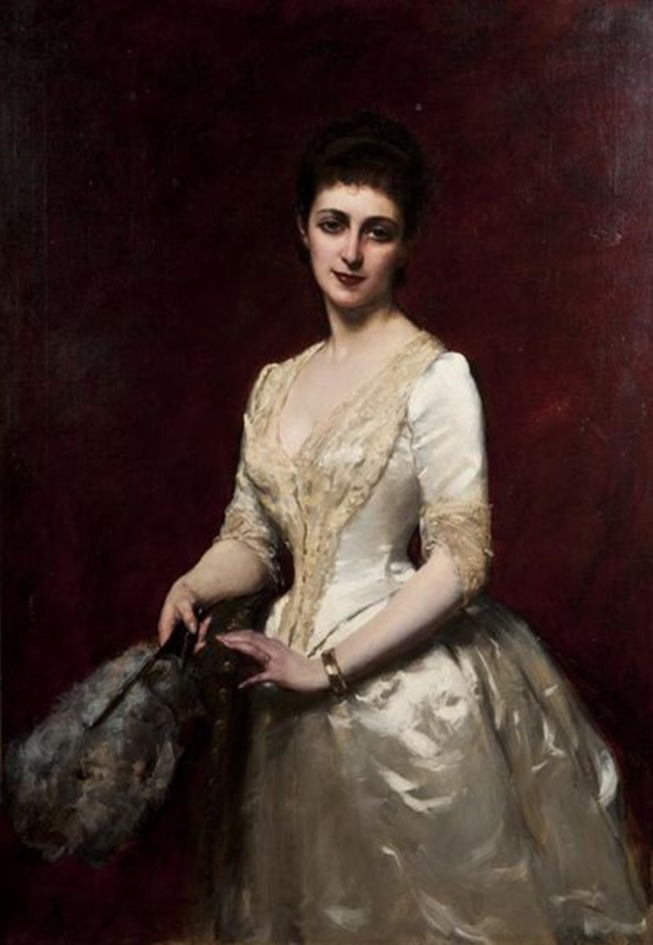
- Born: 25 August 1857; Verrières-le-Buisson, Essonne, France
- Died: 15 July 1943 (aged 85); Paris, France
- Spouse: Prince Henri Amédée de Broglie; Prince Luis Fernando of Orléans
- Issue: 5 (Albert, Antoinette, Jacques, Robert and Marguerite)
- Occupation: Aristocrat

Marie Say (1857–1943) was a French heiress and socialite.

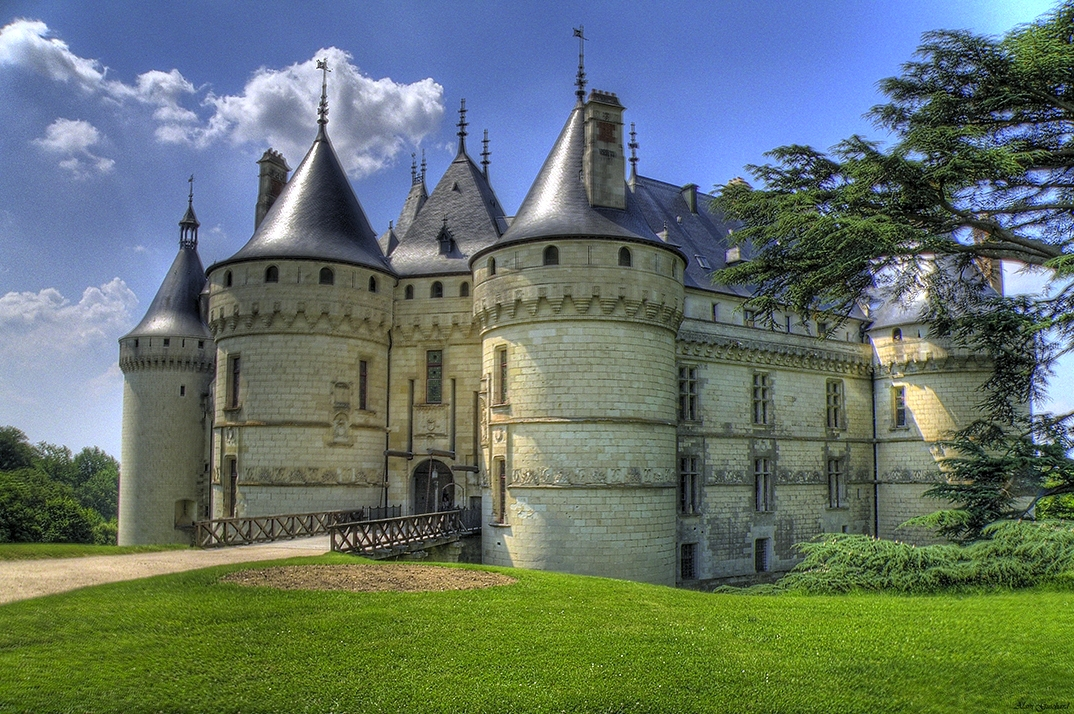
Château de Chaumont.

== Early life ==
Marie Say was born on 25 August 1857 in Verrières-le-Buisson near Paris. Her paternal grandfather, Louis Auguste Say, was the founder of the Say sugar company (now a subsidiary of Tereos). Her father, Constant André Say, ran the family business, which sold sugar made from beetroot. Her granduncle, Jean-Baptiste Say, was an economist and formulator of Say's law.

Her sister, Jeanne (1848–1916), married Roland, Marquis de Cossé-Brissac (1843–1871), and her brother, Henry (1855–1899), succeeded his father at the Say refinery.

== Adult life ==
Say purchased the château de Chaumont with her inheritance in 1875, at the age of seventeen. Shortly after, she married Prince Amédée de Broglie, at the Eglise de la Madeleine in Paris. They had five children (Albert, Antoinette, Jacques, Robert and Marguerite) together.

Say became known as Princess Amédée de Broglie. The couple entertained George V, Isabella II of Spain and the Shah of Iran as guests, receiving the gift of an elephant from another guest, Jagatjit Singh. The couple organized performances by the Paris Opera and the Comédie-Française for their guests. They also resided at the Hôtel de Broglie, an hôtel particulier in Paris.

Say was widowed in 1917. In London on 19 September 1930 she non-dynastically married the former Spanish infante, Prince Luís Fernando de Orleans y Borbón, he being then 41 years old and she 72 years old. According to Pierre de Cossé, Duc de Brissac, her second husband spent the vast majority of her fortune.

== Death ==
Say died on 15 July 1943 in Paris.

== Ancestry ==
Ancestors of Marie Say

8. Jean Étienne Say
4. Louis Auguste Say
9. Françoise Brun de Castanet
2. Constant André Say
10. Charles Isidore Maressal
5. Constance Maressal
11. Marie Opportune Homassel
1. Marie Say
12. Jean Baptiste Wey
6. Julien Wey
13. Marie Françoise Foucherot
3. Jeanne Marie Emilie Wey
14. Jean Pierre Glady
7. Eugènie Françoise Elisabeth Glady
15. Caroline Françoise Steinheil
