= Real Maestranza de Caballería de Valencia =

The Real Maestranza de Caballería de Valencia (Royal Cavalry Armory of Valencia) is a Spanish maestranza de caballería created in 1690. The first set of bylaws were approved seven years later, and currently the organization is governed by the latest draft of 1999. It has as its patron saint the Virgin Mary of the Immaculate Conception. Since the Real Cédula of 1760, it has enjoyed the same privileges as its sisters in Granada and Sevilla.
