= Château de Chaumont =

Château in Chaumont-sur-Loire, France

Coordinates: 47°28′45″N 1°10′55″E

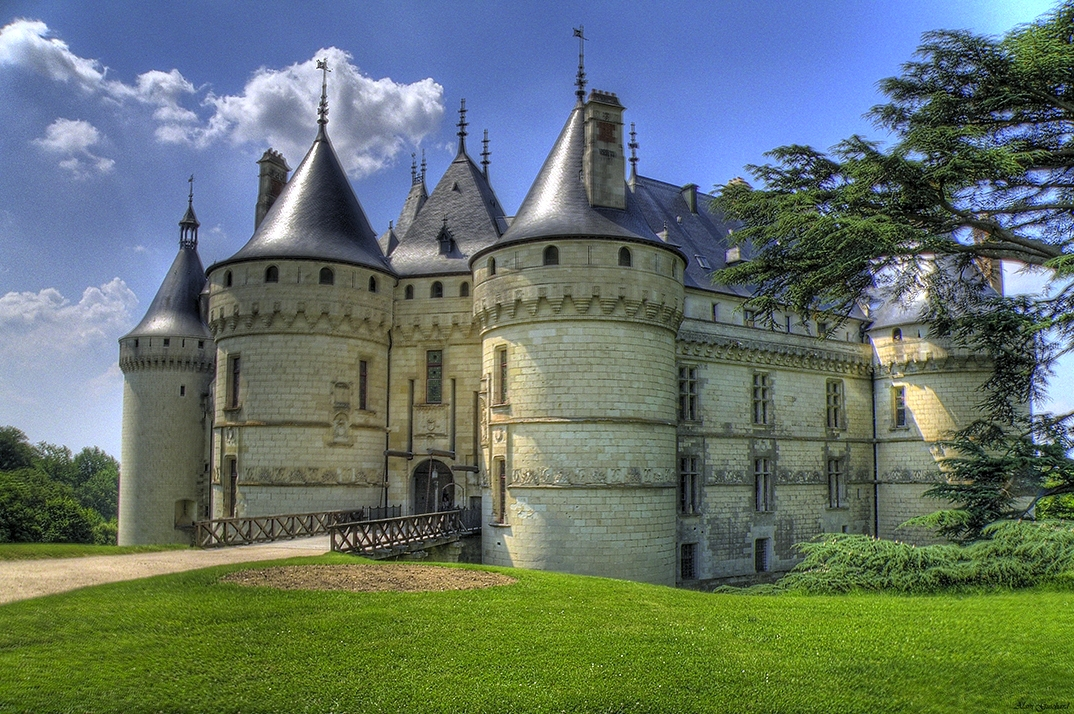
Château de Chaumont in 2008

The Château de Chaumont (French pronunciation: [ʃɑto də ʃomɔ̃]), officially Château de Chaumont-sur-Loire, is a castle (château) in Chaumont-sur-Loire, Centre-Val de Loire, France. The castle was founded in the 10th century by Odo I, Count of Blois. After Pierre d'Amboise rebelled against Louis XI, the king ordered the castle's destruction. Later in the 15th century Château de Chaumont was rebuilt by Charles I d'Amboise. Protected as a monument historique since 1840, the château was given into state ownership in 1938 and is now open to the public.

== History ==
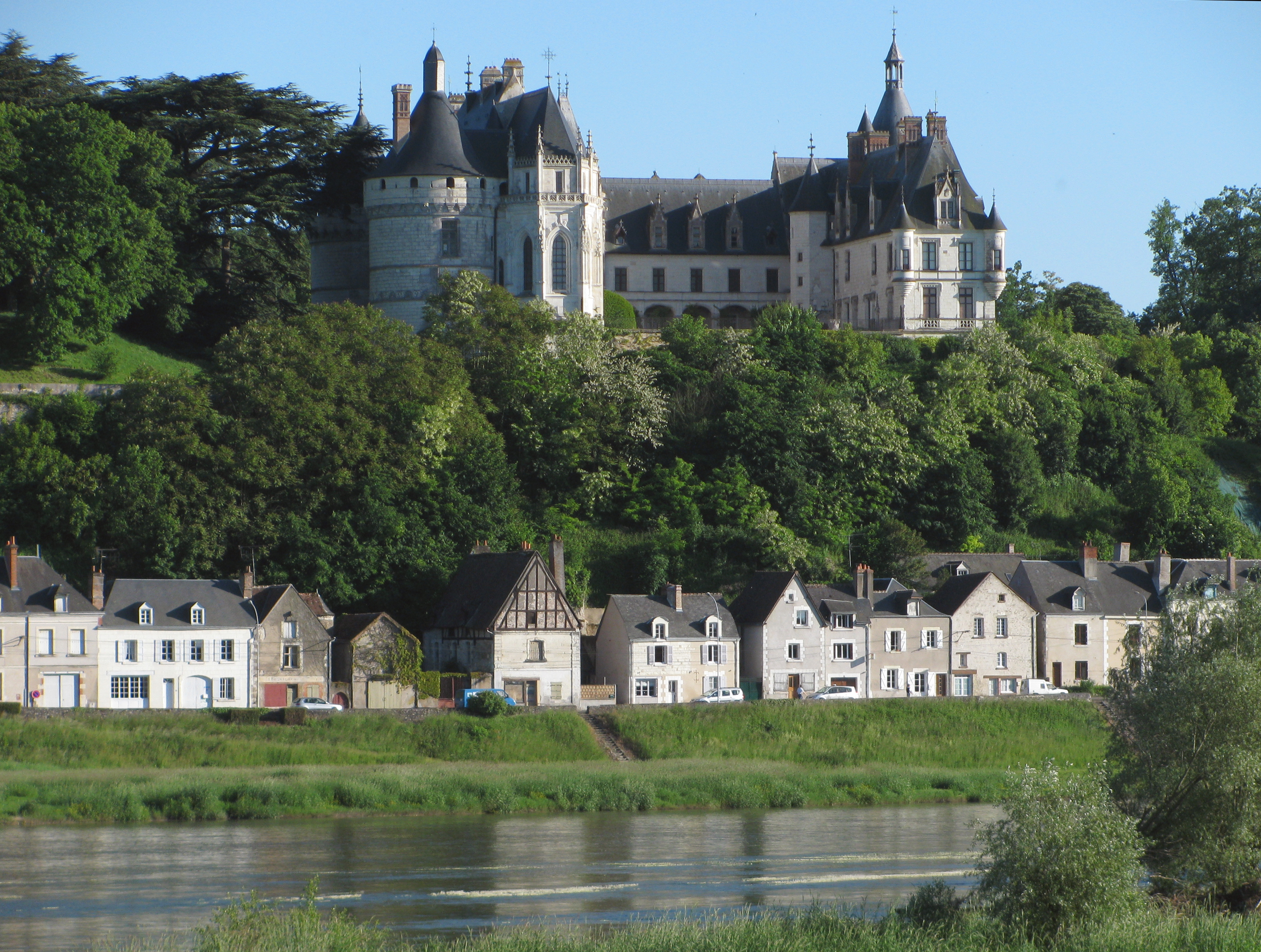
Château de Chaumont stands above the River Loire.

The name Chaumont derives from the French chauve mont, meaning "bald hill". The first castle on this site, situated between Blois and Amboise, was built by Odo I, Count of Blois, in the 10th century, with the purpose of protecting his lands from attacks by his feudal rival, Fulk Nerra, Count of Anjou. On his behalf the Norman Gelduin received it, improved it and held it as his own. His great-niece Denise de Fougère, having married Sulpice d'Amboise, passed the château into the Amboise family for five centuries.

Pierre d'Amboise unsuccessfully rebelled against King Louis XI and his property was confiscated, and the castle was dismantled on royal order in 1465. It was later rebuilt by Charles I d'Amboise from 1465 to 1475 and then finished by his son, Charles II d'Amboise de Chaumont from 1498 to 1510, with help from his uncle, Cardinal Georges d'Amboise; some Renaissance features were to be seen in buildings that retained their overall medieval appearance.

The château was acquired by Catherine de Medici in 1550. There she entertained numerous astrologers, among them Nostradamus. When her husband, Henry II, died in 1559 she forced his mistress, Diane de Poitiers, to accept the Château de Chaumont in exchange for the Château de Chenonceau which Henry had given to de Poitiers. Diane de Poitiers only lived at Chaumont for a short while.

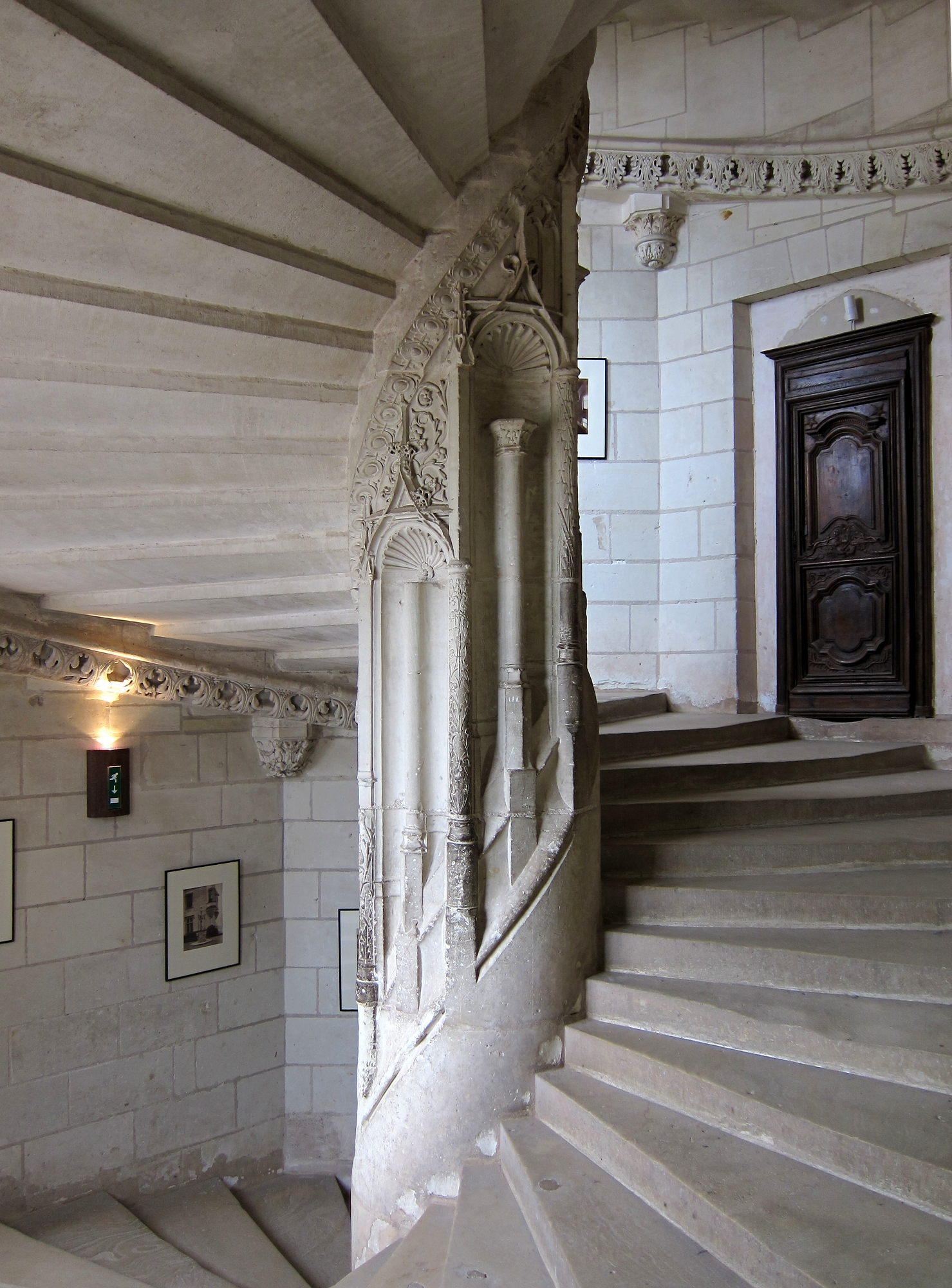
A staircase within the château

In 1594, at the death of Diane's granddaughter Charlotte de la Marck, the château passed to her husband, Henri de La Tour d'Auvergne, Duke of Bouillon, who sold it to a tax farmer Largentier, who had grown rich on gathering in the salt tax called the gabelle. Largentier eventually being arrested for peculation, the château and the title of sieur de Chaumont passed into a family originating at Lucca, who possessed it until 1667, when it passed by family connections to the seigneurs de Ruffignac.

Paul de Beauvilliers, duc de Beauvilliers and later duc de Saint-Aignan, bought the château in 1699, modernized some of its interiors and decorated it with sufficient grandeur to house the duc d'Anjou on his way to become king of Spain in 1700. His eventual heir was forced to sell Chaumont to pay his debts to a maître des requêtes ordinaire to Louis XV, Monsieur Bertin, who demolished the north wing built by Charles II d'Amboise and the Cardinal d'Amboise, to open the house towards the river view in the modern fashion.

In 1750, Jacques-Donatien Le Ray purchased the castle as a country home where he established a glassmaking and pottery factory. He was considered by the French as a "Father of the American Revolution" because he loved America. However, in 1789, the new French Revolutionary government seized Le Ray's assets, including his beloved Château de Chaumont.

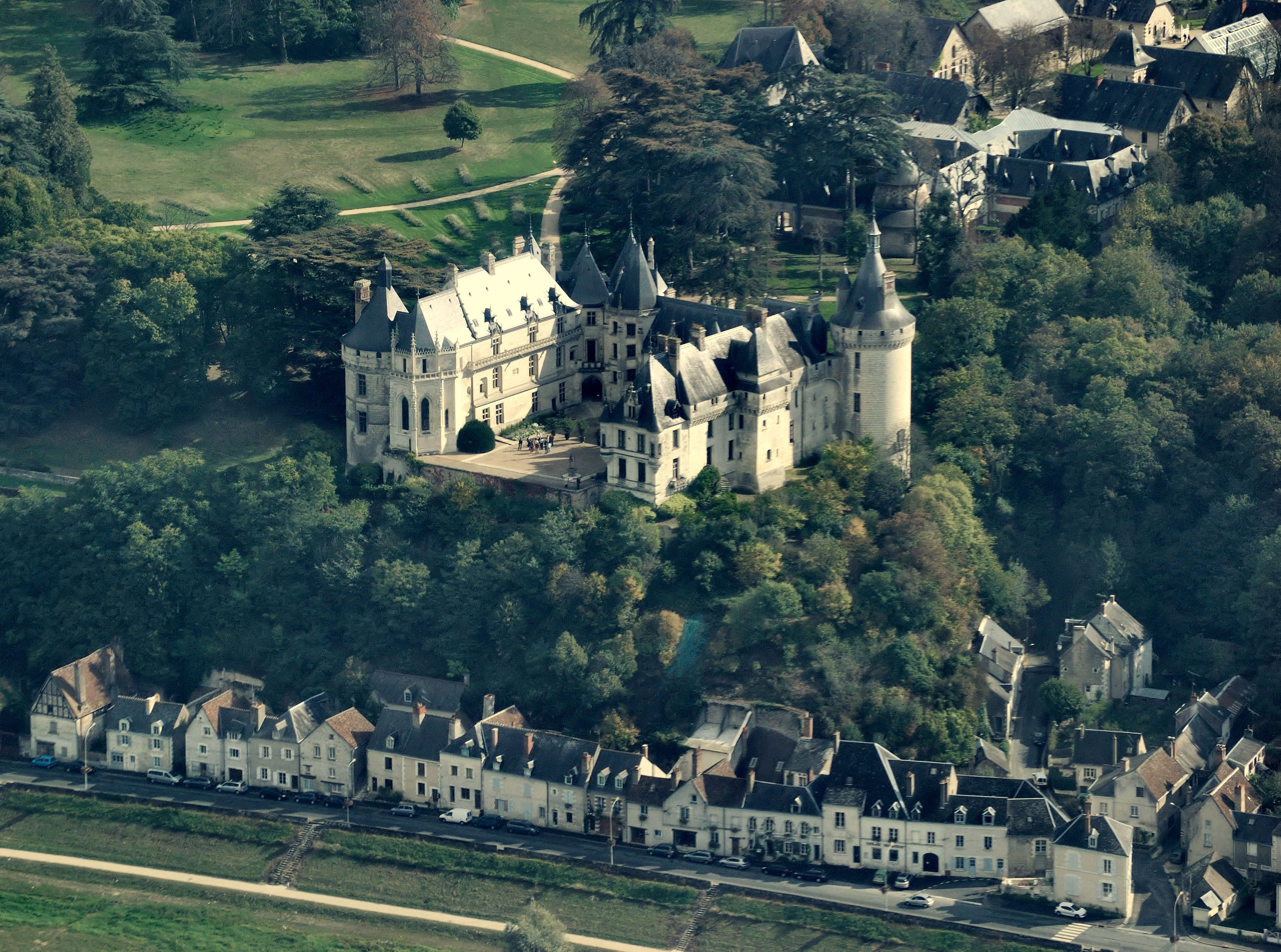
Aerial view

Madame de Staël acquired the château in 1810. The Comte d'Aramon bought the neglected château in 1833, undertook extensive renovations under the architect Jules Potier de la Morandière of Blois, who was later inspector of the works at the château de Blois; M. d'Aramon installed a museum of medieval arts in the "Tour de Catherine de Médicis". By 1851 the "Chaumont suite" of the early-16th century Late Gothic tapestries with subjects of country life emblematic of the triumph of Eternity, closely associated with Chaumont and now at the Cleveland Museum of Art, was still hanging in the "Chambre de Catherine de Médicis"; the tapestries had been cut and pieced to fit the room.

The castle has been designated as a Monument historique since 1840 by the French Ministry of Culture. Marie-Charlotte Say, heiress to the Léon Say sugar fortune, acquired Chaumont in 1875. Later that year, she married Prince Amédée de Broglie (descendant of Madame de Staël), who commissioned the luxurious stables in 1877 to designs by Paul-Ernest Sanson, further restored the château under Sanson's direction and replanted the surrounding park in the English naturalistic landscape fashion. She donated Château de Chaumont to the government in 1938.

During World War II, the French Jewish organization Œuvre de secours aux enfants (OSE), the Children's Aid Society, brought over 200 Jewish children to the property during the Holocaust. As of 2023, only a few of the refugees were still living.

The Château de Chaumont is currently a museum and every year hosts a Garden Festival from April to October where contemporary garden designers display their work in an English-style garden.

== Gallery ==
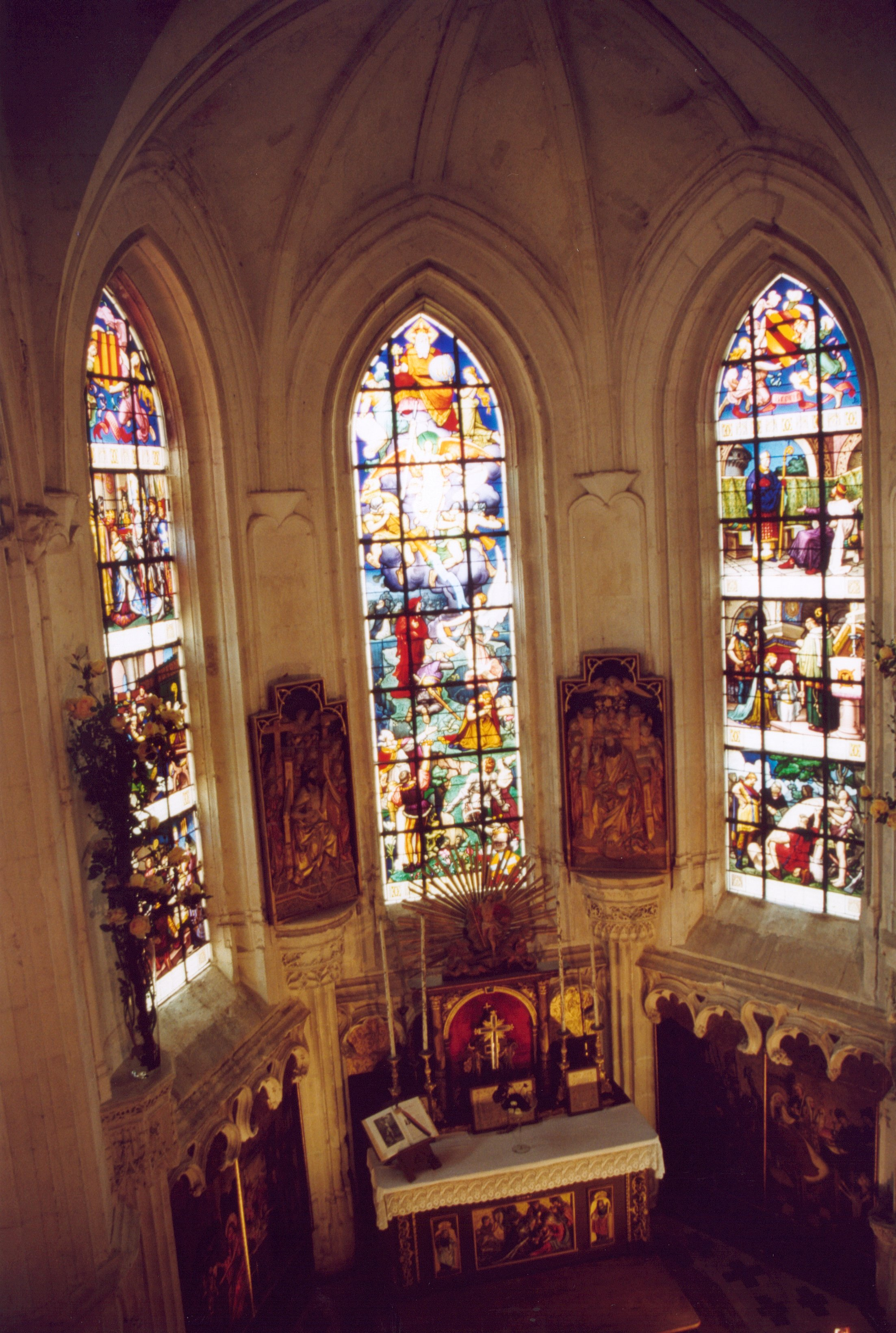
The chapel

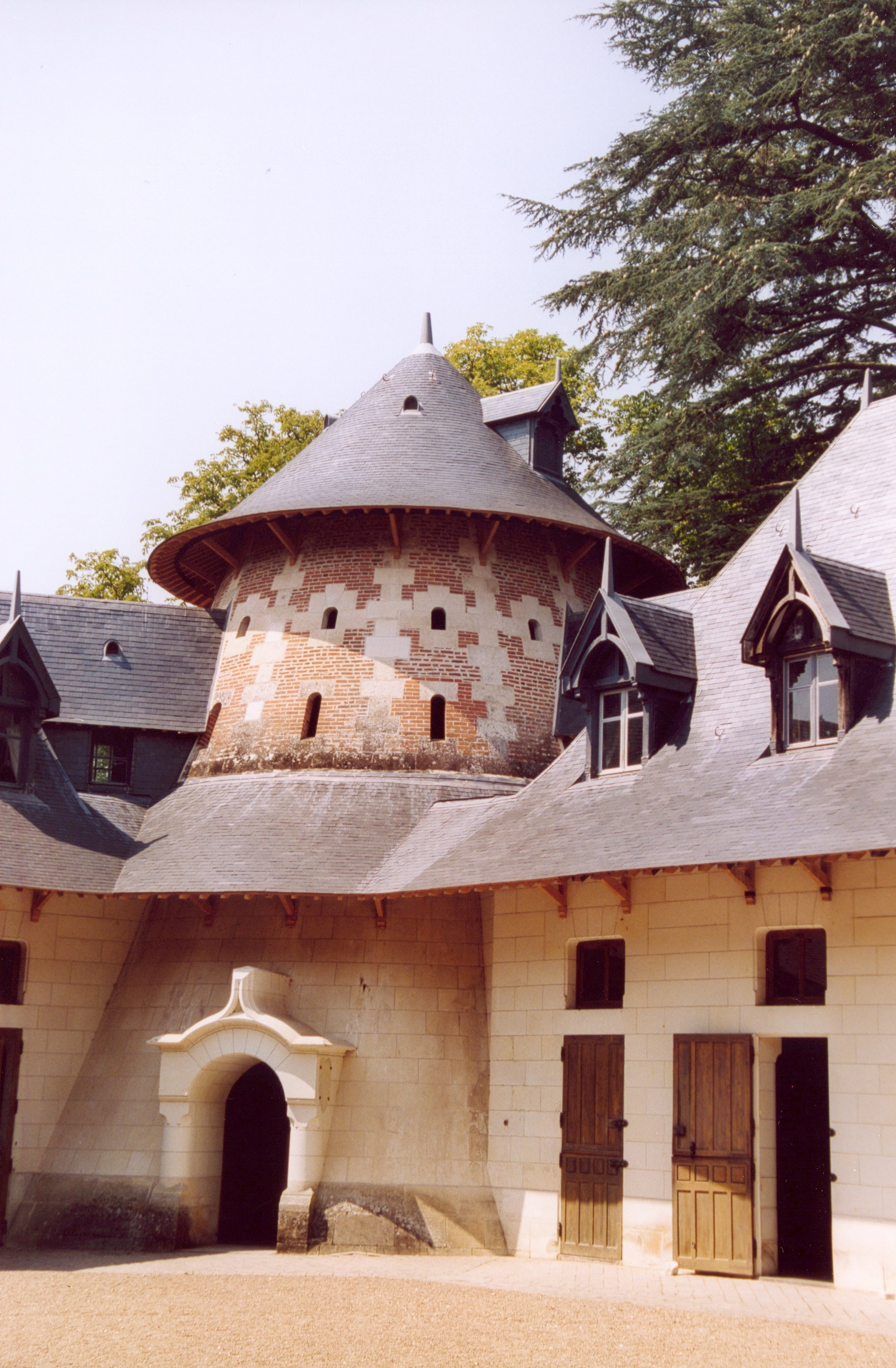
Stables

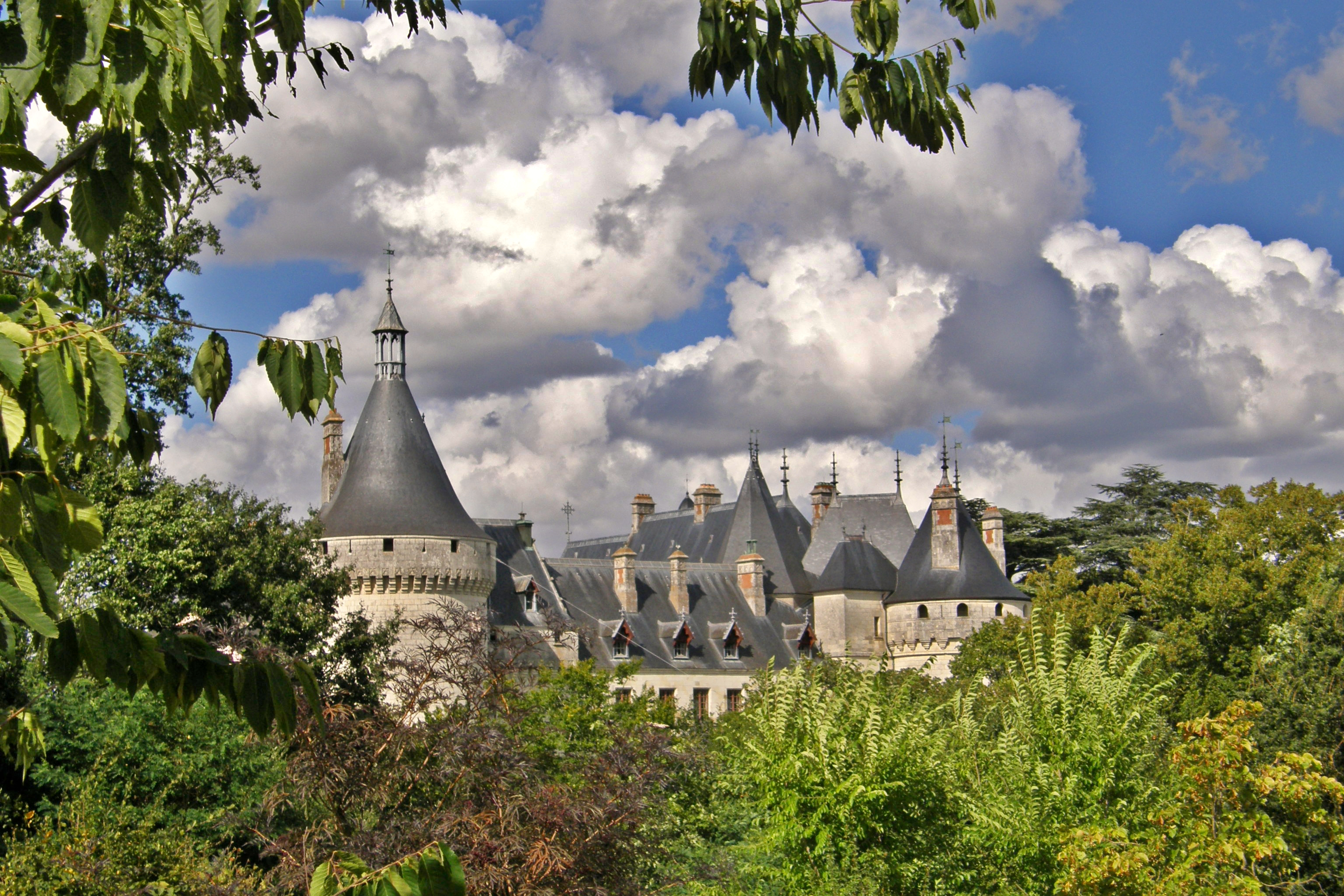
The castle seen from the garden

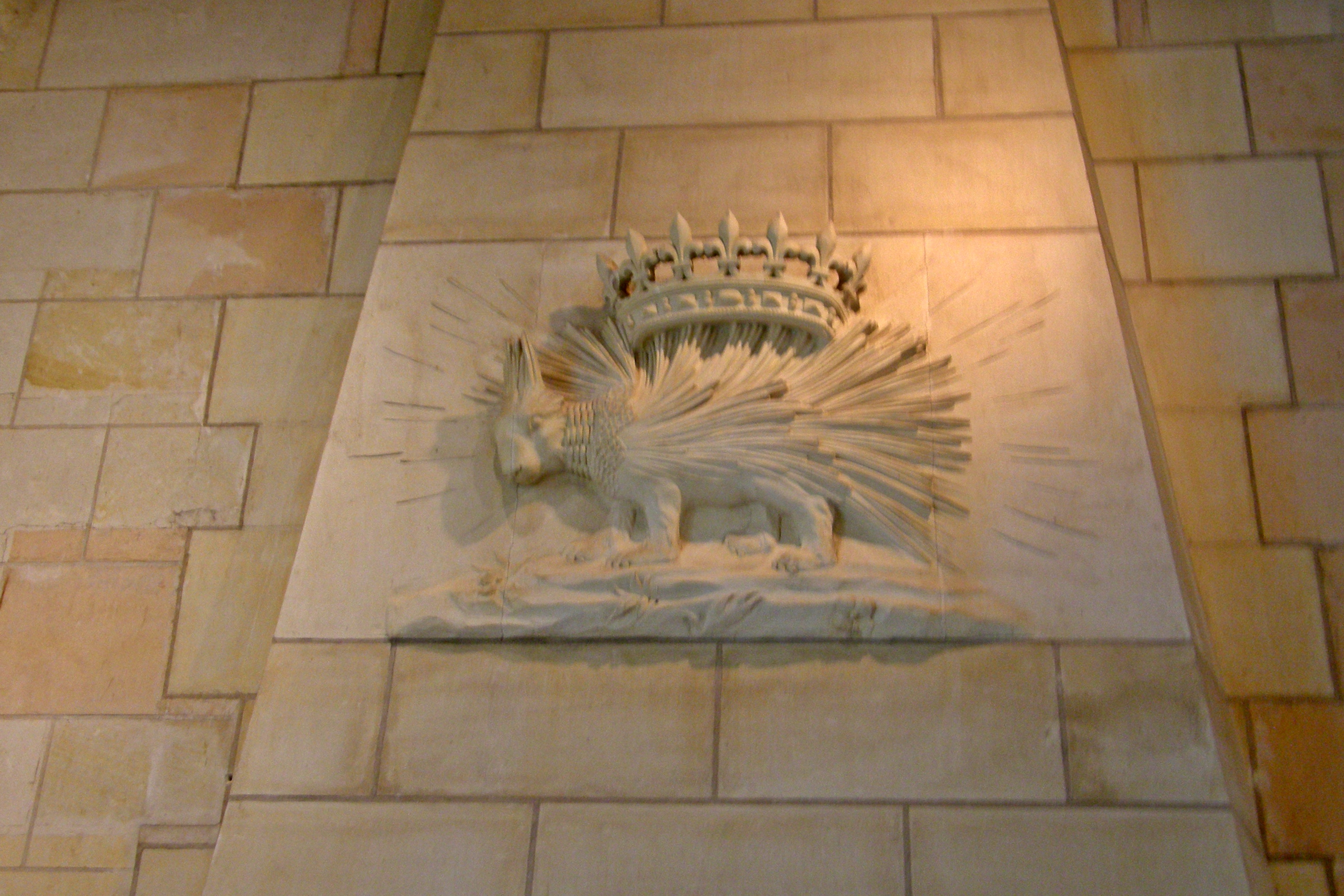
Coat of arms of Louis XII

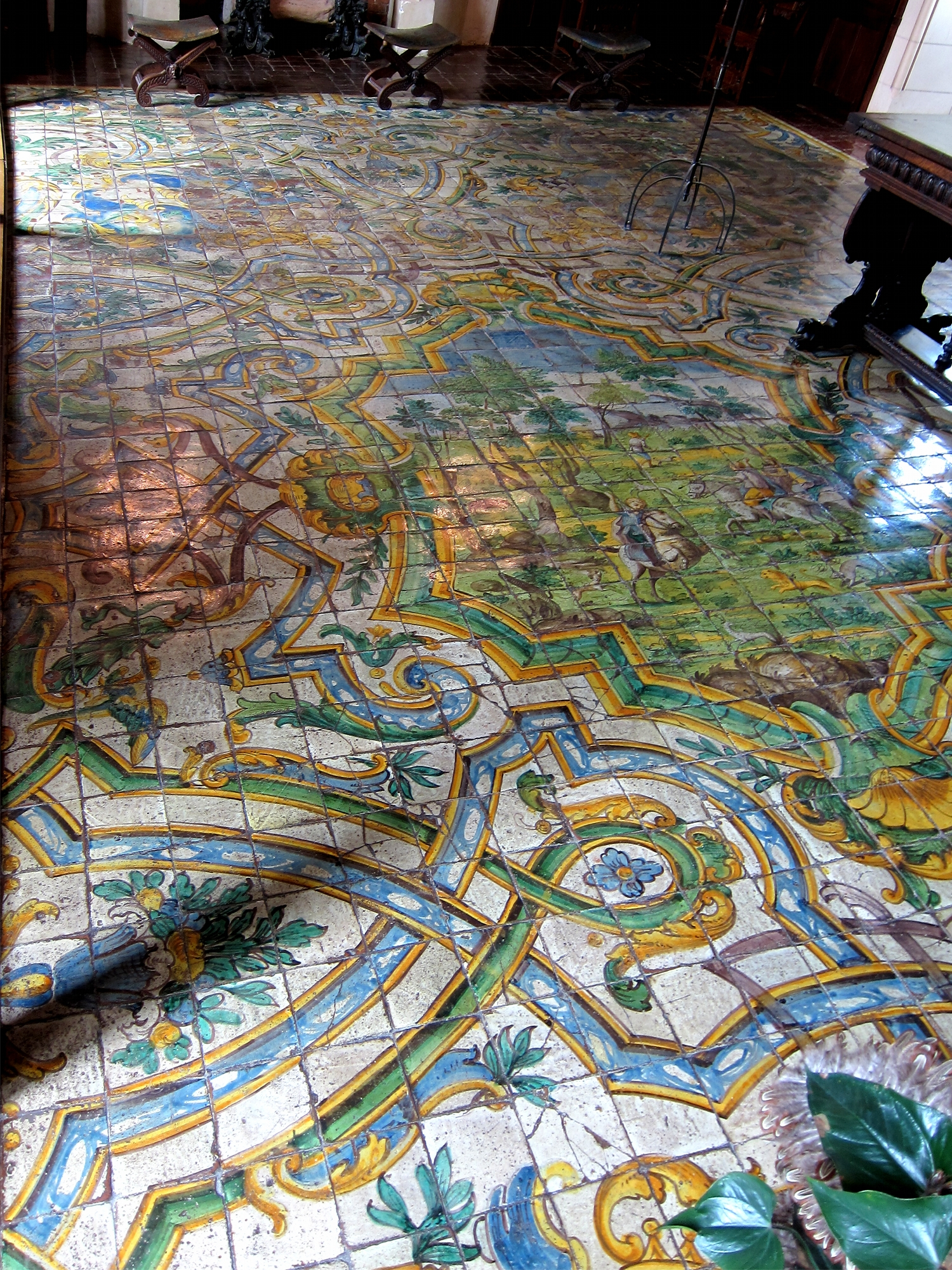
The floor of the lounge

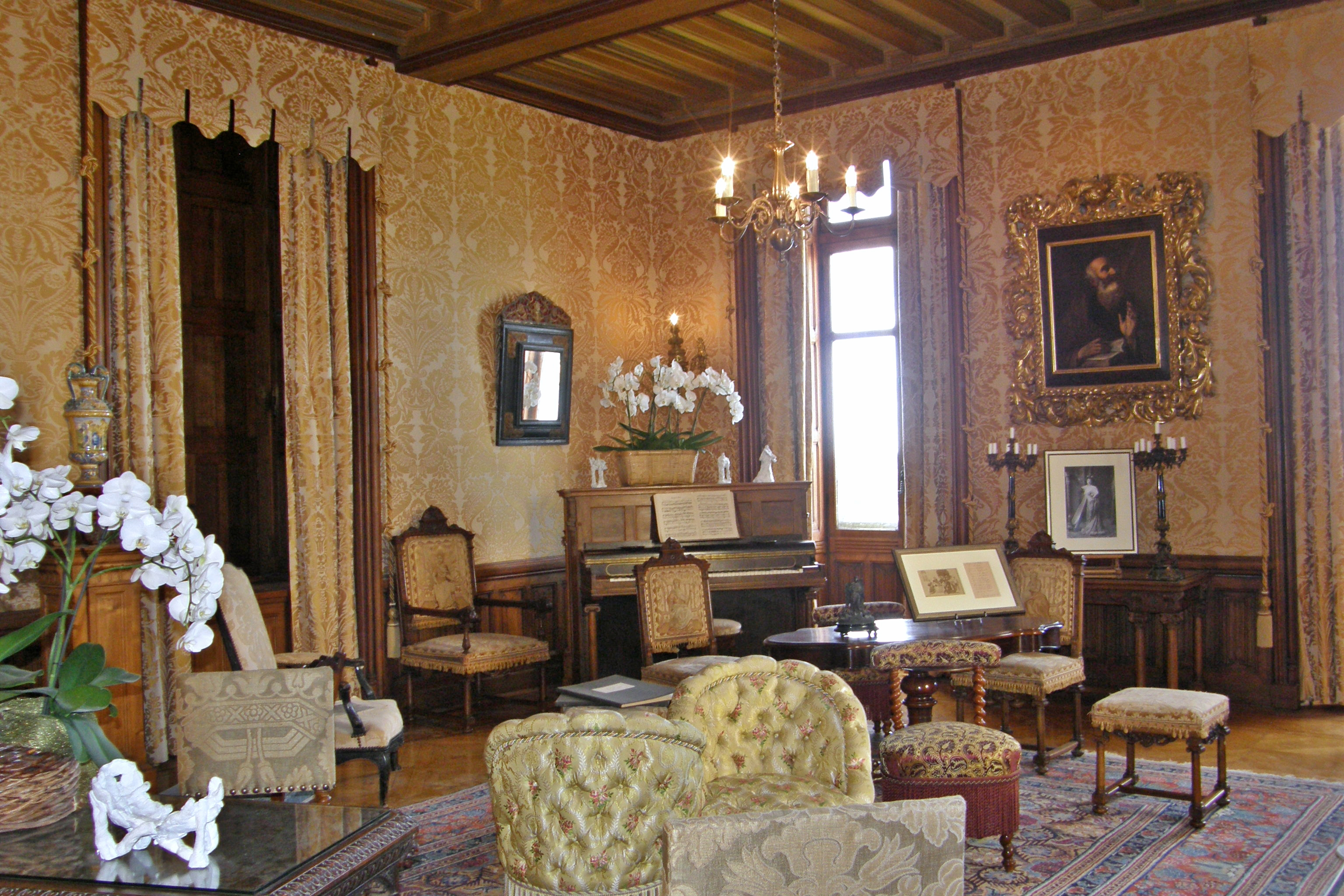
Lounge of Prince de Broglie

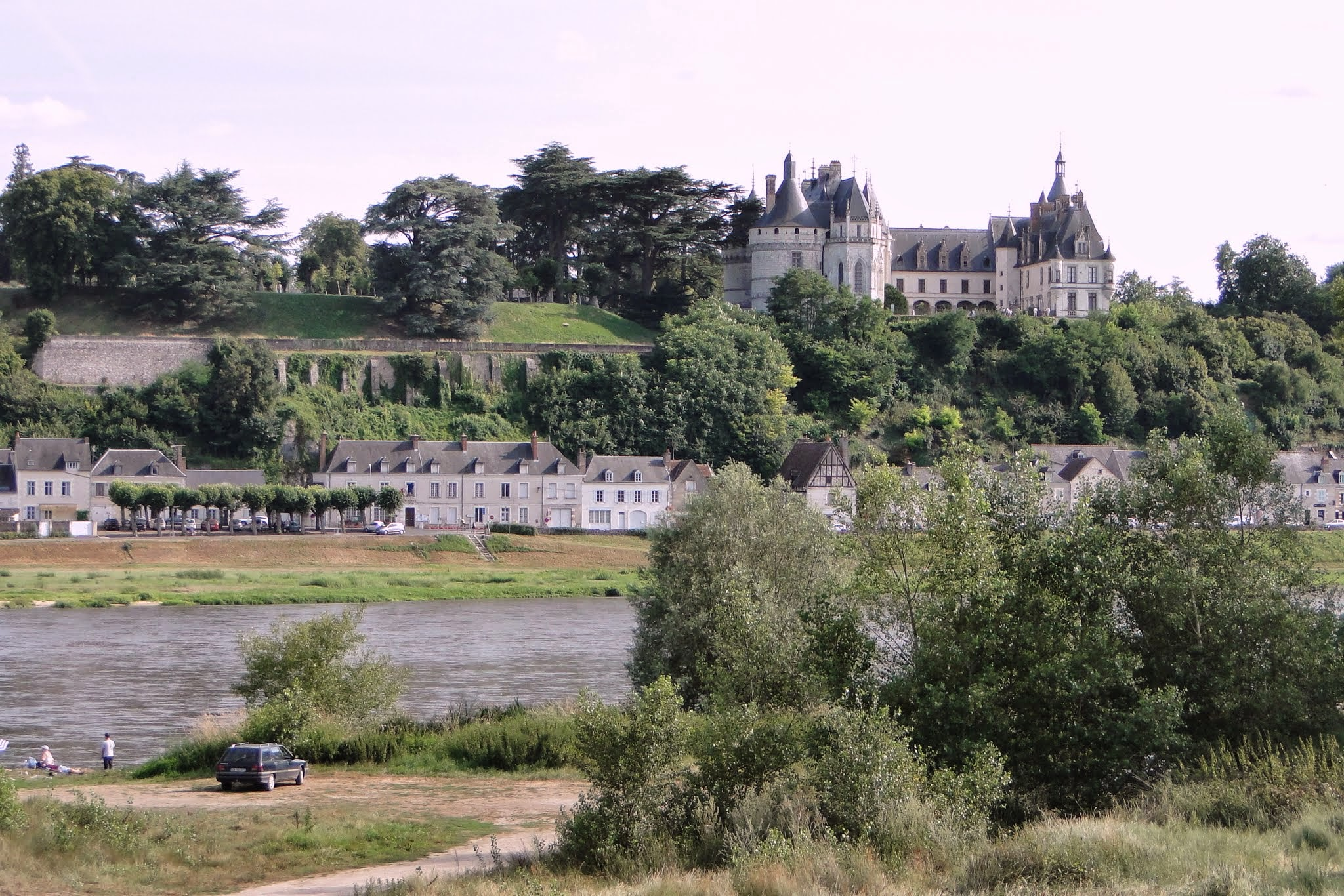
Château de Chaumont

== See also ==
- List of castles in France
