= Amédée de Broglie =

Henri Amédée de Broglie, Prince de Broglie (8 February 1849 – 5 November 1917).

== Life ==
He was born in Paris, the son of Albert, 4th duc de Broglie and his wife Pauline de Galard de Brassac de Béarn.

He married Marie Say (1857–1943), grand daughter of Louis Auguste Say on 7 June 1875 in Paris. they had five children together His widow later married Luís Fernando de Orleans y Borbón.

He died in Paris.
