= Real Maestranza de Caballería de Sevilla =

Royal Cavalry Armory of Seville Real Maestranza de Caballería de Sevilla
- Coat of arms of the order
- Type: Maestranza de caballería and formerly a Military Order
- Country: Spain
- Religious affiliation: Catholic
- Hermano Mayor: King of Spain

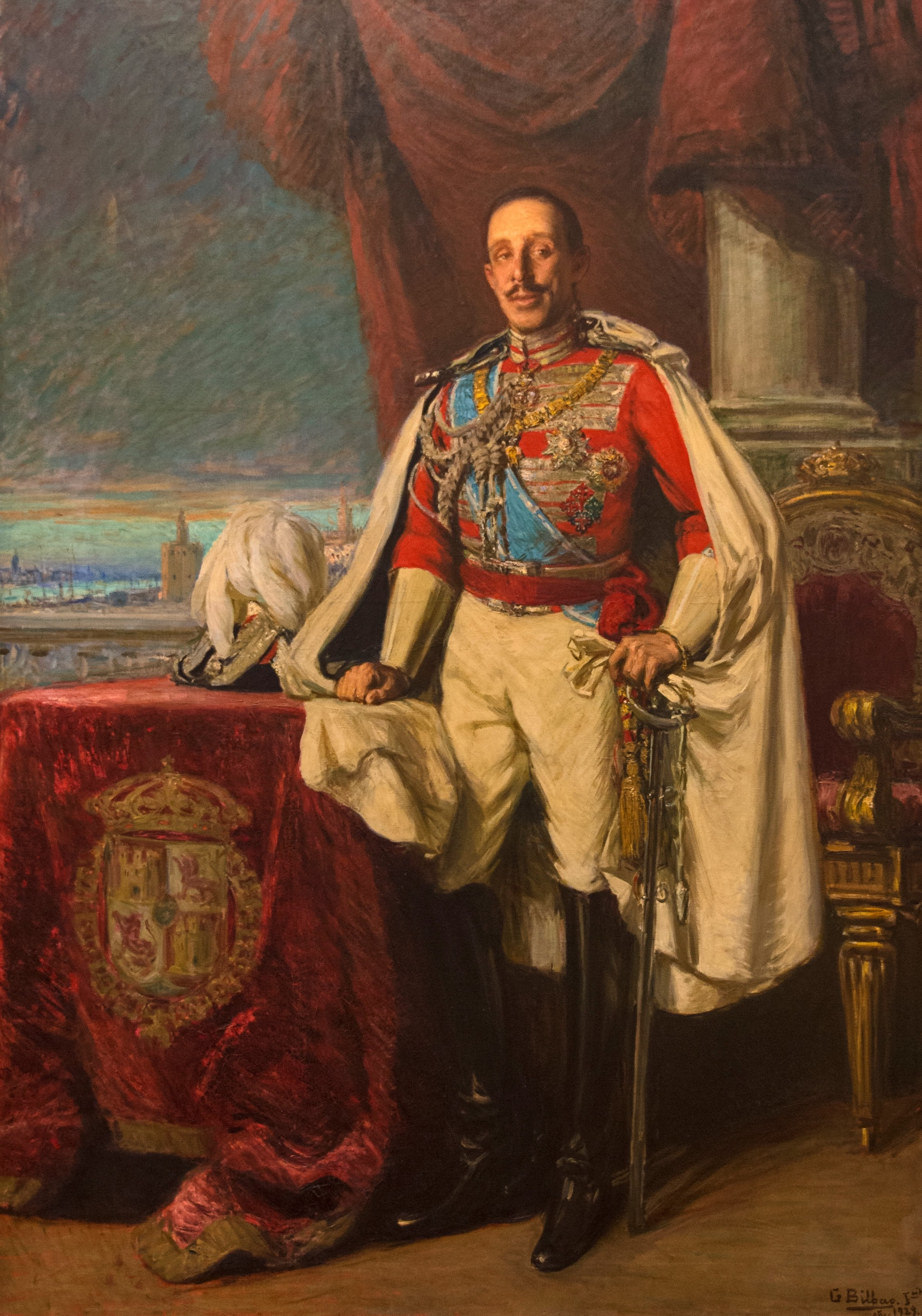
Alfonso XIII in the distinctive uniform of the order. The uniform is nowadays worn by some nobles on the occasion of their wedding.

The Real Maestranza de Caballería de Sevilla (Spanish for 'Royal Cavalry Armory of Seville') is a Spanish maestranza de caballería or chivalric order created in 1670 from the remnants of the preceding Cofradía de San Hermenegildo (or Hermandad Caballeresca). It was created under the advocacy of the patron saint, Our Lady of the Rosary, and its original purpose was to train nobles in the use of arms and war horsemanship in order to better serve the Spanish Crown. It also served to train officers for the army.

Ten years later, it drew up and ratified its own bylaws, and it underwent successive reforms in 1732, 1793, 1913, 1966, and finally in 1978. It was the first of the maestranzas de caballería to gain the privilege of being led by a member of the Spanish monarchy, in 1730.

The order has been led by the following members of the Spanish royal family as Hermanos Mayores (literally 'older brothers'):

- Philip, Duke of Parma (1730–1765)
- Luis of Spain, Count of Chinchón (1765–1785)
- Fernando VII (1786–1834)
- Isabella II (1834–1874)
- Alfonso XII (1785–1885)
- Maria Christina of Austria (1885–1889)
- Alfonso XIII (1889–1941)
- Infante Juan, Count of Barcelona (1941–1993)
- Juan Carlos I (1993–2014)
- Felipe VI (2014–present)

Since the outset, the institution has also organized many public events in the city of Sevilla, and it was one of the first guilds to sponsor equestrian sports there. One of its most noteworthy contributions was the creation of the Plaza de toros de la Real Maestranza de Caballería de Sevilla.

The uniform of the Real Maestranza de Caballería de Sevilla was worn by Carlos de Borbón-Dos Sicilias to the royal wedding in 1962 of his first cousin Juan Carlos of Spain, at which he served as the 'best man' and held the Spanish Royal Crown above the future monarch's head. In 2021, the uniform was worn at his wedding by Carlos Fitz-James Stuart, 22nd Count of Osorno, younger son of the Duke of Alba.
