= Tereos =

Worldwide manufacturer of sugar, starch, and bioethanol

Tereos S.A.

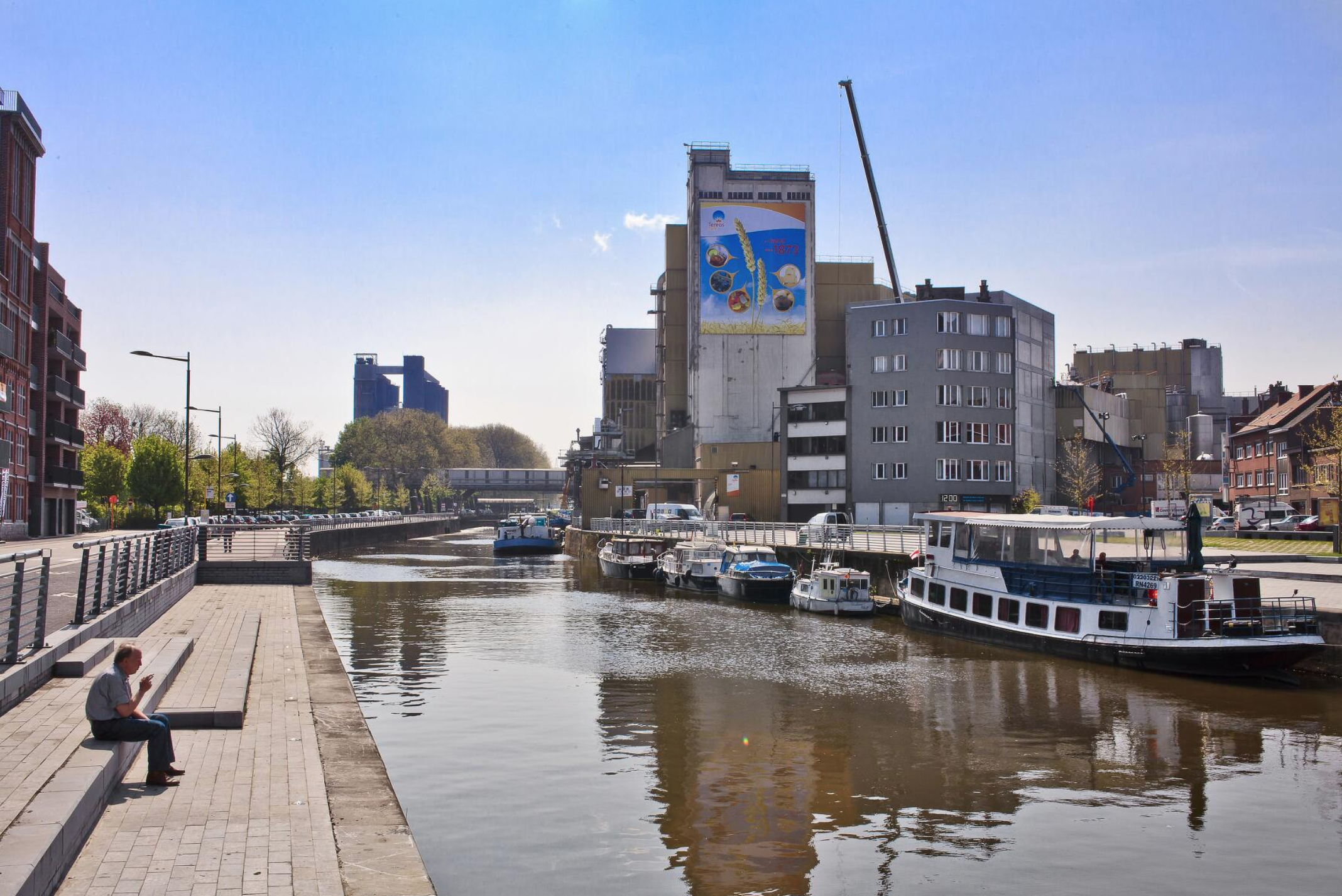
- Tereos facility in the city center of Aalst
- Company type: Cooperative
- Industry: Agriculture & Bioenergy
- Founded: (1999)
- Headquarters: Moussy-le-Vieux, France
- Key people: Oliviér Leducq, (Chairman) Gérard Clay, (Chairman of the Supervisory Board of Tereos)
- Products: Sugar, cereal, bioethanol, alcohol, starch
- Revenue: ▲€ 4.5 Billion (2019/20)
- Number of employees: 22,300
- Website: www.tereos.com

Tereos is a cooperative conglomerate, primarily active in the processed agricultural raw materials, in particular sugar, alcohol and starch markets. It has 44 factories in 9 countries, including Brazil, India, Indonesia, Kenia, Tanzania, Belgium and France and employs about 20.000 people.

The company is headquartered in Moussy-le-Vieux, France.

== History ==
In 1932, the Origny-Sainte-Benoite cooperative distillery was founded in the Aisne department of northern France by a number of farmers under the leadership of Paul Cavenne. The factory processed 400 tonnes of sugar beet per day. About twenty years later, Jean Duval, managing director of the cooperative, converted the distillery into a sugar factory, which was able to process 900 tonnes of sugar per day.

In the 1990s, the Origny cooperative merged with that of Vic-sur-Aisne, which operate a sugar plant that handled 5,500 tonnes of sugar beet per day. The new entity was named SDA (Sucreries et Distilleries de l’Aisne). A year later, it acquired the Berneuil sugar factory in south-western France.

The acquisition of the leading French sugar producer, Béghin-Say from the Italian company Edison, in 2002, marked a turning-point. The combination of the two companies made the new cooperative group a French market leader with 9,500 cooperative growers. Tereos was born.

In 2006, Tereos merged with the cooperative group SDHF (Sucreries et Distilleries des Hauts de France). This extended the Group's business and strengthened its leadership on the French market.

In 2008, Tereos acquires, via subsidiary Syral, 5 starch and glucose factories in West-Europe from Talfiie (Tate & Lyle Food & Industrial Ingredients Europe), subsidiary of the company Tate & Lyle.

In 2016, the Connantre sugar beet cooperative (Tereos Group) joined forces with the cooperative, APM Déshy, allowing Tereos to expand its business into alfalfa processing, with four dehydration plants in north-eastern France (in Anglure, Aulnay-aux-Planches, Montépreux and Pleurs).

Tereos SCA was created in 2018. The 12,000 cooperative grows now all belong to a single cooperative.

In 2021, Tereos was ranked fifth overall on FoodTalks' Top 50 Global Sweetener Companies list.

In January 2022, Tereos announced the sale of its 11% stake in its joint venture with Axereal dedicated to malt as well as the closure of its sugar activities in Romania. In February, Tereos also announced the closure of its activities in Mozambique.

In February 2023, Tereos announced the sale of its activities in Romania to two local players.

== Activities ==
The Tereos product portfolio covers the markets of food, animal feed, green chemistry, pharmaceuticals and cosmetics, paper and cardboard, and energies.

== Controversies ==
In recent years Tereos has been mired in controversy after several news reports highlighted the company's involvement in a number of dubious events. In 2019, a complaint was filed against the firm for allegedly supplying an artificial sweetener to Syria, where it is being used to make weapons. In 2020, the region of Wallonia accused the company of a leak in its sugar beet refinery, causing 50-70 tonnes of fish to die in the Belgian territory.
