= Real Maestranza de Caballería de Granada =

Current emblem of the `Real Maestranza de Caballería de Granada´

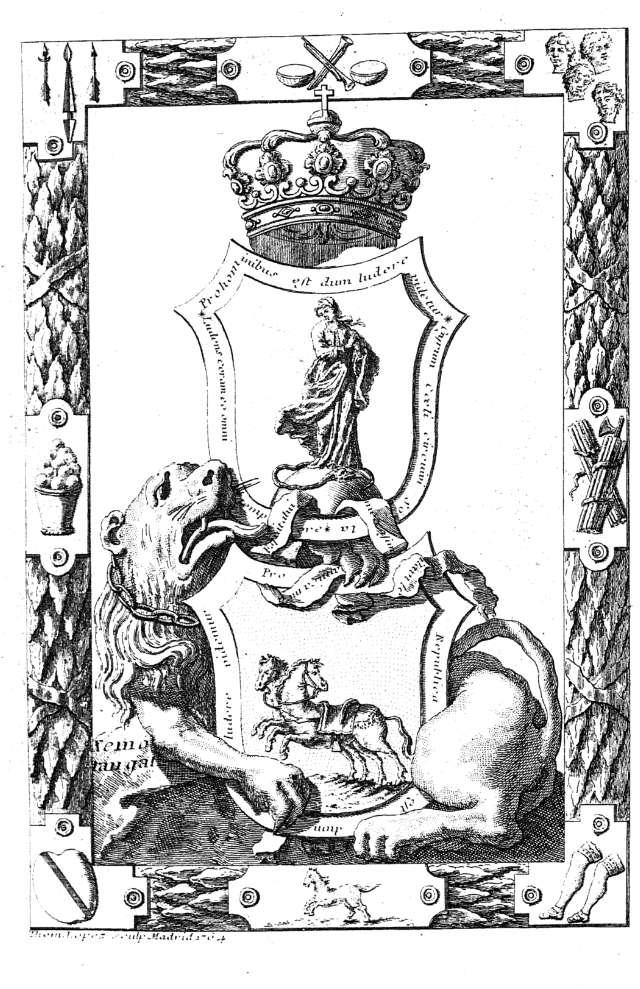
Bastard title of the Statutes and Ordinances of the `Real Maestranza´ of the city of Granada. Granada ANT-XVIII-368.

The Real Maestranza de Caballería de Granada (Royal Cavalry Armory of Granada) is a Spanish maestranza de caballería created in 1686 under the advocacy of the patron saint Nuestra Señora del Triunfo (Our Lady of Victory). One year later it approved a set of bylaws, and since 1992 it has been governed by state law. In 1741 it was granted the right of being led by a member of the Spanish royal family.

== Genealogy ==
- Afán de Ribera y Montero de Miranda
- Moctezuma y Aguilera-Orense
- Almansa y Gámiz
- Alvarez de las Asturias Bohorques
- Pacheco de Padilla, Altamirano, Recio-Chacón, García Callejón y Ruiz Berriz de Torres
- Verdugo, Álvarez de Bohorques, Montalvo, Abreu y Cotoner
- Pérez de Vargas y Andrada-Vanderwilde
- Carvajal y Aranda
- Baillo
- Muñoz, Bernaldo de Quiros, Borbón y Méndez de Vigo
- Cañaveral, Ponce de León, Cañas, Ruiz de Molina, López de Mendoza y Medinilla
- Carvajal y Ulloa
- Castillejo, Rubio, Márquez, Trillo Figueroa, Adán, Robles, Tortolero y Torre Marín
- Coello de Portugal y Torres Cabrera
- Contreras, San Martín y Uribe
- Chico de Guzmán
- Dávila, Ponce de León, Del Rosal, Durán, Eizmendi y Benito de Blanes
- Torres Ponce de León, Diez de Rivera y Guerrero de Torres
- Escobedo
- Fernández de Córdova y De la Puerta
- Fuentes, Fonseca y Nicuesa
- Fontes y Aguado
- Güemes, Armada y Comyn
- Heredia, Liñán, Roza y Manso
- Herrera, Fernández de Liencres, Arista y Nestares
- Ruiz Berriz de Torres, López de Mendoza, Padilla-Pacheco y Sotomayor
- Maldonado, Muñoz de Salazar, Allendesalazar y Landecho
- Martínez Carrasco y Vázquez Zafra
- Montalvo, Maza y Dávila
- Medrano, Treviño, Barreda y Corchado
- Beltrán de Caicedo, Messia de la Cerda y Prado
- Mora, González Torres de Navarra
- Narváez, Campos, Henríquez de Luna, Porcel, Andaya y López-Cuervo
- Osorio-Calvache, Arias de Morales, Montenegro y Fernández del Pino
- Pérez de Barradas, Ganada Venegas y Guiral
- Pérez de Herrasti, Robels y Yanguas
- Pérez del Pulgar
- Piñeyro
- Ponce de León, Moreno, Castro y De Montes
- Porcel, Aguirre, Corvera, Uriarte y Fernández Zapata
- Queipo de Llano
- Ramírez Tello, Toledo y Gómez de las Cortinas
- Sánchez de Teruel, Villalva, Godoy y Ansoti
- Quesada, Sanchiz, Zulueta y Brena
- Torres Ponce de León y Santa Olalla
- Serrano, Luque y Zejalbo
- Suarez de Toledo, Valderrama y Busto
- Sweertz, Campos, Mantilla de los Ríos y Fernández de Bobadilla
- Tabares, Campos, Nicuesa, Fernández de Bobadilla, Arizcun y Martos
- Cáceres, Ulloa y Orozco
- Carvajal, Ayala, Sequera, Enríquez y Valenzuela
- Varona de Alarcón, Dávila, Velázquez, Tamayo, Bilbao y Castillejo
- Velluti, Tavira, López de Ayala y Adán de Yarza
- Vereterra, peón, Duque de Estrada y Colmenares
- Villarreal y Fernández de Prada.
- Palacio, Zafra, Enciso, Fernández Tejeiro, Corvera y Godoy
- Zarate, Mora y Muñoz Cobo
