= Grand Master of the Order of Saint Lazarus =

List of masters or grand masters of the Order of Saint Lazarus

The grand master of the Order of Saint Lazarus was the leader of an order of chivalry that was established by the Holy See in the 12th century. A number of Masters of the order, eventually termed Grand Masters, have been listed by previous historians of the order.

The early history of the Order of Saint Lazarus, as in the case of several other medieval orders, is shrouded in a haze of reality and myth simply because the early historians of the various orders assumed the role of enthusiastic eulogists to the detriment of objective writing. The genealogists even went so far as to try tracing origins to personages and events in the Old Testament. The available early cartulary only confirms some of the individuals in the list.

To complicate matters further, historical legacy and contingency is claimed by the modern-day Order of Saint Lazarus (statuted 1910) – see also: Grand Master of the Order of Saint Lazarus (statuted 1910).

Following the fall of Acre in 1291, the Order relocated its headquarters to the Château of Boigny in France. Over the subsequent centuries, the Order underwent a complex institutional evolution:

- In the Italian states, it was merged in 1572 with the Order of Saint Maurice to form the Order of Saints Maurice and Lazarus under the House of Savoy, which remains a recognized dynastic order today.
- In France, it was administratively linked in 1608 to the Order of Our Lady of Mount Carmel, becoming a prestigious royal institution until it lost formal protection under the Bourbon Restoration in 1830.

The Holy See does not recognize any other organization using the name "Order of Saint Lazarus" as a legitimate order of chivalry outside of the Order of Saints Maurice and Lazarus of the House of Savoy.

== List of masters or grand masters ==
The following individuals have been elected as Masters or Grand Masters of the Order of Saint Lazarus, or any of its predecessor titles. Their highest title is shown here:

Order	Name	Image	Title	Date installed	Term ended	Term of office	Comments	Notes
1	Gérard le Fondateur		Master of the Order of St John in the Latin Kingdom of Jerusalem	1099	1120	20–21 years	No further information about his patronymic origins is known. Founder of the Order of St John. Allegedly was also responsible for the Leprosarium outside the walls of Jerusalem.	
2	Boyant Roger		Master of the Hospitallers of St Lazarus in the Latin Kingdom of Jerusalem	1120	1131	10–11 years	Served as Rector of the Hospital of St John in Jerusalem. Allegedly followed Gérard as Master of the Leprosarium, while Raymond de Puy assumed the Mastership of the Hospitallers of St John.	
3	Jean			circa 1131	circa 1153	21–22 years	No further information about his patronymic origins is known.	
4	Barthélémy or Bartholomeo			circa 1153	circa 1154	0–1 years	No further information about his patronymic origins is known. He is mentioned in the cartulary of the Order published by de Marsy in 1883.	
5	Hitier or Hector			circa 1154	circa 1155	0–1 years	No further information about his patronymic origins is known. He is mentioned in the cartulary of the Order published by de Marsy in 1883.	
6	Hughes de Saint-Paul			circa 1155	circa 1157	1–2 years	No further information about his patronymic origins is known. He is mentioned in the cartulary of the Order published by de Marsy in 1883.	
7	Raymond du Puy		Master of the Hospitallers of St John in the Latin Kingdom of Jerusalem	1157	1159	1–2 years	He allegedly further assumed the Mastership of the Leprosarium in Jerusalem at the end of his life.	
8	Rainier or Lambertus			circa 1164	circa 1168	3–4 years	No further information about his patronymic origins is known. He is mentioned in the cartulary of the Order published by de Marsy in 1883.	
9	Raymond			circa 1168	circa 1169	0–1 years	No further information about his patronymic origins is known. He is mentioned in the cartulary of the Order published by de Marsy in 1883.	
10	Gérard de Montclar			circa 1169	1185	15–16 years	He is mentioned in the cartulary of the Order.	
11	Bernard			1185	1186	0–1 years	No further information about his patronymic origins is known. He is mentioned in the cartulary of the Order published by de Marsy in 1883.	
12	Gauthier de Châteauneuf or Walter de Novo Castro			1228	1234	5–6 years	Served originally as Master of Burton Lazars in England, before becoming Master General of the Order. He is mentioned in the cartulary of the Order published by de Marsy in 1883.	
13	Rainaldus de Floriaco or Reynald de Fleury			1234	1254	19–20 years	He is mentioned in the cartulary of the Order published by de Marsy in 1883.	
13a	Miles			circa 1256	1267	10–11 years	Not usually listed by authors but a contemporary deed mentions him as being the serving magister of the Order.	
14	Jean de Meaux		Preceptor General of the Hospitallers of St Lazarus in Acre in the Latin Kingdom of Jerusalem	circa 1267	1277	9–10 years	He is titled Preceptor General in a charter dated 1267.	
15	Thomas de Sainville		Master General of the Hospitallers of St Lazarus in Acre in the Latin Kingdom of Jerusalem	1277	1312	34–35 years	He was responsible for moving the central seat of the Order to Boigny, France before the fall of Acre.	
16	Sir Adam de Veau		Master General of the Order of the Hospitallers of St Lazarus in Boigny, France	1313	1330	16–17 years	Previously served as Master of Burton Lazars, England, before becoming Master General of the Order.	
17	Jean de Paris		Master General of the Order of the Hospitallers of St Lazarus in Boigny, France	1332	1348	15–16 years		
18	Jean de Couraze		Master General of the Order of the Hospitallers of St Lazarus in Boigny, France	circa 1349	circa 1354	4–5 years		
19	Jean le Comte		Master General of the Order of the Hospitallers of St Lazarus in Boigny, France	circa 1355	1361	5–6 years		
20	Jacques de Besnes or Jacques de Baynes		Master General of the Order of the Hospitallers of St Lazarus in Boigny, France	circa 1382	1384	1–2 years		
21	Pierre des Ruaux		Master General of the Order of the Hospitallers of St Lazarus in Boigny, France	1413	1454	40–41 years		
22	Guillaume des Mares		Master General of the Order of the Hospitallers of St Lazarus in Boigny, France	circa 1454	1469	14–15 years		
23	Jean le Cornu		Master General of the Order of the Hospitallers of St Lazarus in Boigny, France	1469	1493	23–24 years		
24	François d'Amboise		Grand Master of the Order of the Hospitallers of St Lazarus in Rhodes	1493	1500	6–7 years	Nephew of Aimery d'Amboise.	
25	Agnan de Mareul			1500	1519	18–19 years		
26	François de Bourbon, Comte de Saint-Paul		Commander of the Order of the Hospitallers of St Lazarus in Boigny, France	1519	1521	1–2 years		
27	Claude de Mareul			1521	1554	32–33 years	Nephew of Agnan de Mareul.	
28	Jean de Conti			1554	1557	2–3 years		
29	Jean de Lévis		Grand Master of the Order of the Hospitallers of St Lazarus in Boigny, France	1557	1564	6–7 years	Knight of St John. Was confirmed as Grand Master of St Lazarus with the papal bull Nos igitur.	
30	Michel de Seure de Lumigny		Grand Master of the Order of the Hospitallers of St Lazarus in Boigny, France	1564	1578	13–14 years	Was originally a Knight of St John. He resigned his post as Grand Master in 1578 but retained magisterial privileges.	
31	François de Salviati		Vicar General of the Order of the Hospitallers of St Lazarus in Boigny, France	1571	1586	14–15 years	Was originally Knight and Ambassador of St John. Served as Vicar General from 1571 to 1578.	
32	Michel de Seure de Lumigny		Grand Master of the Order of the Hospitallers of St Lazarus in Boigny, France	1586	1593	6–7 years	Resumed the role of Grand Master on the death of François Salviati.	
33	Aymard de Clermont de Chastes		Grand Master of the Order of the Hospitallers of St Lazarus in Boigny, France	1593	1599	5–6 years	Was originally a Knight of St John. Served as Marshal of St John and Vice-Admiral of France.	
33a	Hughes Catelan de Castelmore			circa 1603			Included by some authors. His appointment is however in doubt.	
34	Jean-Charles de Gayand de Monterolles			1599	1604	4–5 years	Nephew of Aymard de Clermont de Chastes. apparently served in a proxy role for his uncle while the latter was in Canada.	
35	Philibert, Marquis de Nérestang		Grande Maître de Ordres Royaux, Militaires et Hospitaliers de Notre-Dame du Mont-Carmel et de Saint-Lazare de Jérusalem Réunis	1604	1613	8–9 years	Grand Master of St Lazarus and later of the Order of Our Lady of Mount Carmel, united to it in 1608 by King Henri IV.	
36	Claude, Marquis de Nérestang		Grande Maître de Ordres Royaux, Militaires et Hospitaliers de Notre-Dame du Mont-Carmel et de Saint-Lazare de Jérusalem Réunis	1613	1639	25–26 years	Son of Philibert	
37	Charles, Marquis de Nérestang		Grande Maître de Ordres Royaux, Militaires et Hospitaliers de Notre-Dame du Mont-Carmel et de Saint-Lazare de Jérusalem Réunis	1639	1644	4–5 years	Son of Claude	
38	Charles-Achilles, Marquis de Nérestang		Grande Maître de Ordres Royaux, Militaires et Hospitaliers de Notre-Dame du Mont-Carmel et de Saint-Lazare de Jérusalem Réunis	1645	1673	27–28 years	Brother of Charles	
39	François-Michel le Tellier, Marquis de Louvois		Vicar General de Ordres Royaux, Militaires et Hospitaliers de Notre-Dame du Mont-Carmel et de Saint-Lazare de Jérusalem Réunis	1673	1691	17–18 years	Vicar General of the Order with magisterial privileges.	
40	Philippe de Courcillon, Marquis de Dangeau		Grande Maître de Ordres Royaux, Militaires et Hospitaliers de Notre-Dame du Mont-Carmel et de Saint-Lazare de Jérusalem Réunis	1691	1720	28–29 years		
41	Prince Louis de Bourbon, Duc d'Orléans, Chartres, Valois, Nemours et Montpensier		Grande Maître de Ordres Royaux, Militaires et Hospitaliers de Notre-Dame du Mont-Carmel et de Saint-Lazare de Jérusalem Réunis	1720	1752	31–32 years		
42	Prince Louis de France, Duc de Berry		Protector de Ordres Royaux, Militaires et Hospitaliers de Notre-Dame du Mont-Carmel et de Saint-Lazare de Jérusalem Réunis	1757	1773	15–16 years	Later King Louis XVI (serving as Protector from 1774).	
43	Prince Louis Stanislas Xavier de France, Comte de Provence, Duc d’Anjou		Protector de Ordres Royaux, Militaires et Hospitaliers de Notre-Dame du Mont-Carmel et de Saint-Lazare de Jérusalem Réunis	1773	1814	40–41 years	Later King Louis XVIII (serving as Protector from 1814 to 1824). Brother of King Louis XVI.	

== See also ==
- Grand master (order)
- Grand Master of the Order of Saint Lazarus (statuted 1910)
- Grand Master of the Teutonic Order
- Grand Masters and Lieutenancies of the Order of the Holy Sepulchre
- List of grand masters of the Knights Hospitaller
- List of grand masters of the Knights Templar

== Bibliography ==
- Algrant y Cañete, James J.; Beaugourdon, Jean de St. Vincent de (1983). Armorial of the Military and Hospitaller Order of St. Lazarus of Jerusalem. Delft.
- Savona-Ventura, Charles. (2012). Military and Hospitaller Order of Saint Lazarus of Jerusalem - Grandmasters, Administrators & Protectors. Grand Priory of the Maltese Islands - MHOSLJ, Malta.
