= Order of Saint Lazarus (disambiguation) =

The Order of Saint Lazarus was a Catholic military order founded around the start of the twelfth century in the Kingdom of Jerusalem.

Order of Saint Lazarus may also refer to:

== Orders of chivalry ==
- Order of Saints Maurice and Lazarus, formed from the Italian branch of the Order of Saint Lazarus in 1572 by the House of Savoy
- Royal Military and Hospitaller Order of Our Lady of Mount Carmel and Saint Lazarus of Jerusalem united, formed from the French branch of the Order of Saint Lazarus in 1608 and active until 1830

== Other ==
- Order of Saint Lazarus (statuted 1910), an international and ecumenical order
  - Malta-Paris obedience
  - Orléans obedience
  - Jerusalem obedience: Saint Lazare International, allegedly "restored" in 2012 under Administrator General Prince Sixtus Henry of Bourbon-Parma, with seat in Seedorf, Switzerland
- United Grand Priories of the Order of Saint Lazarus of Jerusalem, founded in 1995 in Malta by inspiration of the original order
- Lazarus Union, founded in 2010 in Vienna, Austria
- Military and Hospitaller Order of Saint Lazarus of Jerusalem - Malta, effectively established in 2013 by Prince Pieter Cantacuzino, with seat in Marsa, Malta
