= Charles-Philippe d'Orléans =

- Count Charles-Philippe d'Évreux
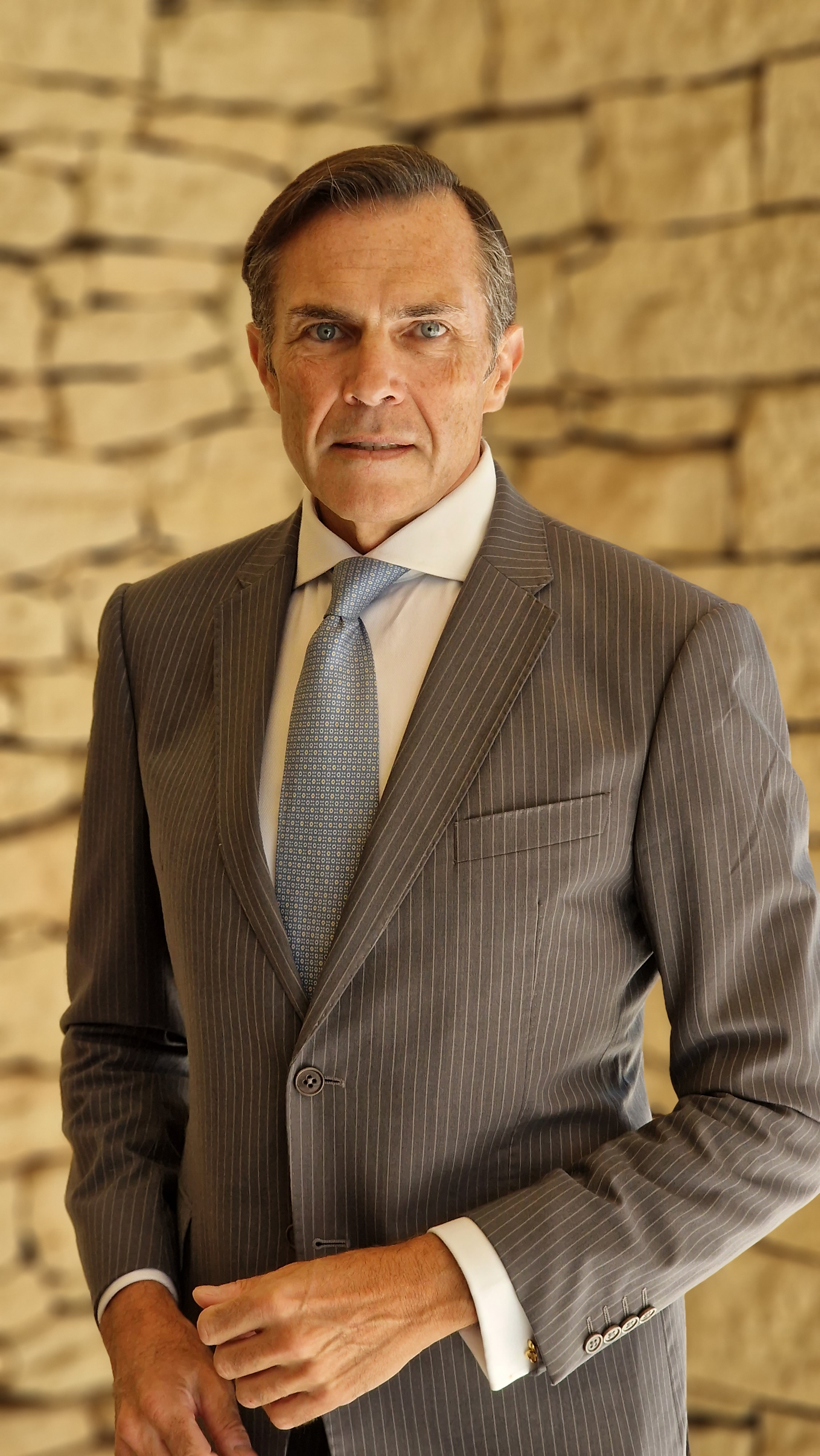
- Charles-Philippe in 2022
- Born: 3 March 1973 (age 53); Paris, France
- Spouse: Diana Álvares Pereira de Melo, 11th Duchess of Cadaval (m. 2008; div. 2022) Naomi-Valeska Kern (m. 2023)
- Issue: Princess Isabelle d'Orléans; Élisabeth d’Orléans
Names
- Charles Philippe Marie Louis d'Orléans
- House: Orléans
- Father: Prince Michel d'Orléans
- Mother: Béatrice Pasquier de Franclieu
- Religion: Roman Catholic

Charles Philippe Marie Louis d'Orléans (born 3 March 1973) is a member of the House of Orléans. He is the elder of two sons of Prince Michel d'Orléans and his former wife, Béatrice Pasquier de Franclieu, member of the French nobility. His paternal grandfather was Prince Henri d'Orléans, the Orléanist pretender to the French throne. As such, Charles-Philippe takes the traditional royal rank of petit-fils de France with the style of Royal Highness.

Charles-Philippe was an independent candidate in the 2012 French legislative election, standing in the Fifth constituency for French residents overseas, which covers Spain, Portugal, Andorra and Monaco. He finished seventh, with 3.05% of the vote. (Within the constituency, he finished fourth in Portugal, his country of residence, with 7.37%, and fourth also in Monaco, with 5.33%.)

Charles-Philippe served as Grand Master of the Orléans obedience of the Order of Saint Lazarus from 2004 to 2010. Since 2004, he styles himself as "Duke of Anjou".

== Marriages and issue ==
On 21 June 2008, Charles-Philippe married Diana Álvares Pereira de Melo, 11th Duchess of Cadaval. The ceremony took place in the Cathedral of Évora. Both husband and wife are Capetians, descending in unbroken male line from King Robert II of France (972–1031), Charles-Philippe through the elder son, King Henry I of France, via the cadet branch of the House of Bourbon-Orléans, and Diana from his younger son Robert I, Duke of Burgundy through the royal (though illegitimate) Portuguese branch of the House of Braganza. The couple are also fifth cousins once-removed through shared descent from King Francis I of the Two Sicilies.

The couple's only child, Princess Isabelle d'Orléans, was born on 22 February 2012 in Lisbon, Portugal. Her godparents are Princess Maria Theodora zu Löwenstein-Wertheim-Freudenberg and Felipe VI of Spain (then Prince of Asturias).

In December 2022, their divorce was announced.

In March 2023, his engagement to Monegasque shooting champion and former model Naomi-Valeska Kern (née Salz), widow of the German fashion designer Otto Kern, was announced. On 9 September 2023, they were married in a civil ceremony. According to the rules of the House of Orléans, a valid marriage requires the consent of the head of the house (which was not given) and a Catholic Church marriage (which did not take place, as Charles-Philippe's first marriage was not annulled). Jean, Count of Paris, head of the house, announced that due to this second marriage, Charles-Philippe had lost his dynastic rights and that his second wife was simply Madame Charles-Philippe d'Orleans, while his former wife retained her French titles and dignities.

As of November 2025, they are expecting their first child together.

Charles-Philippe and Naomi-Valeska's child, Princess Élisabeth Victoire Jeanne Marie d'Orléans, was born on 15 April 2026 in Monaco.

== Politics ==
Charles-Philippe was an independent candidate in the 2012 French legislative election, standing in the Fifth constituency for French residents overseas, which covers Spain, Portugal, Andorra and Monaco. As a candidate, he described himself as "strongly attached to France's republican values", adding that he might subsequently join "a recomposed centre-right party". He finished seventh, with 3.05% of the vote. (Within the constituency, he finished fourth in Portugal, his country of residence, with 7.37%, and fourth also in Monaco, with 5.33%.)

== Order of Saint Lazarus ==
In 2004, Charles-Philippe was appointed as Grand Master of the Orléans obedience of the Order of Saint Lazarus. His acceptance of this role placed the order under the sanction of a dynastic prince of the House of Bourbon, in what is said to be a continuation of a tradition established since the 13th century when the Order of Saint Lazarus came under the protection of King Philippe le Bel. This affiliation had continued over the ensuing centuries but ended with the deposition of King Charles X of France, when a decree of King Louis Philippe I revoked royal protection of the diminishing remnant of the order and made it illegal to wear the order's decorations.

Charles-Philippe's designation as "Grand Master of the Order of Saint Lazarus" was disputed by those knights who remained loyal to his distant cousins (Francisco de Borbón y Escasany, 5th Duke of Seville, and, subsequently, Carlos Gereda y de Borbón, Marquis de Almazán) and to the Melchite Greek Catholic Patriarch Gregory III Laham as Protector of the order.

Charles-Philippe founded the Saint Lazare Foundation, which has been financed by the World Society, an international think tank whose mission, inspired by the Count of Paris, is to explore solutions to the planet's future needs for potable water.

In March 2010, Charles-Philippe decided to step down from his position as Grand Master for personal reasons. However, he maintained his participation in the order's activities as Grand Master Emeritus, as Grand Prior of France, and as chairman of the order's governing council. He was replaced by Count Jan Dobrzenský z Dobrzenicz as Grand Master of the Orléans obedience.

== Title controversy ==
On 8 December 2004, he received the title "Duke of Anjou" from his uncle Prince Henri d'Orléans, head of the House of Orléans. There is some controversy in the use of this title by an Orléans prince. It had traditionally been borne by or associated with the heads of the House of Bourbon that claimed the French throne as Legitimist pretenders since 1883, in rivalry to the claim asserted by the House of Orléans.

In that year, Henri, comte de Chambord, last patrilineal descendant of Louis XV, died childless. The Legitimist legacy was claimed by the next senior branch of the Bourbons, descended from a younger grandson of Louis XIV – Philippe, Duke of Anjou. Although Philippe ceased use of the Anjou title upon becoming King Philip V of Spain in 1700, renouncing his succession rights to the French throne in exchange for retention of his Spanish crown, Legitimists maintained that this act was not binding. Therefore, they still uphold the senior agnatic descendant of Philippe d'Anjou as rightful claimant to the French crown.

In 1989, Louis Alphonse de Bourbon became the senior agnate of the House of Bourbon, claimed the Legitimist succession, as had his father, and was immediately accorded the title "Duke of Anjou" by Legitimists.

He does not claim that Duke of Anjou is an inherited legal title, since it was never officially conferred upon his ancestor Philippe d'Anjou; it was, in fact, subsequently given by French kings to other cadets of the dynasty domiciled in France. Rather, it is explicitly a title of pretense, associated historically, politically and symbolically with French Legitimism.

The House of Orléans never possessed or used the Anjou ducal title during the ancien régime, but its head claims the right de jure to dispose of it, as of all titles traditional in France's royal house. So too does the Legitimist claimant. Thus, Charles-Philippe, Duke of Anjou and Louis Alphonse, Duke of Anjou are contemporaries and cousins — both reared in Spain, as it happens — but nominally represent different and competing rationales for restoration of the French monarchy.

On 26 July 2023, Prince Jean d'Orléans announced in a statement that his cousin's remarriage could not be recognized according to the rules of the Royal House of France. Charles-Philippe would therefore lose his style of Royal Highness, his future wife would not be granted any of the titles attached to the House of France, and any potential offspring from this marriage could not take rank in the Orléanist line of succession to the throne of France. The Count of Paris also specified that Charles-Philippe's first wife, as well as their daughter, would retain their titles and styles, since the prince remains married to Diana de Cadaval in the eyes of the Catholic Church, which does not recognize divorce.

== See also ==
- House of Orléans
