= Castello Lanzun =

- Torri ta' Lanzun
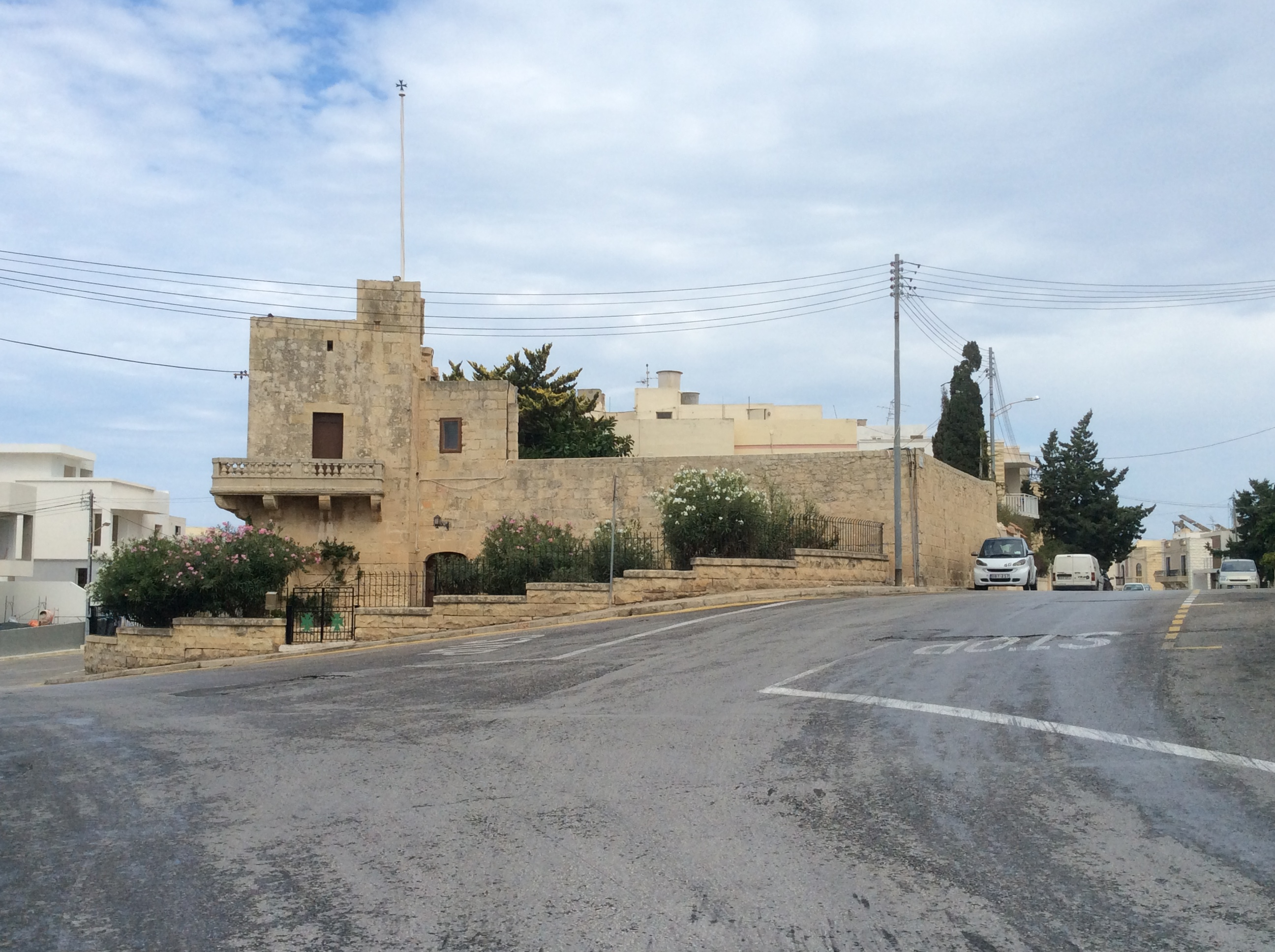
- View of Castello Lanzun
- Interactive map of the Castello Lanzun area
- Alternative names: Lanzun Tower

General information
- Type: Fortified farmhouse
- Architectural style: Traditional Maltese
- Location: San Ġwann, Malta
- Coordinates: 35°54′48.9″N 14°28′49.2″E
- Named for: Wenzu Lanzun
- Construction started: 15th century
- Renovated: 1713
- Owner: Grand Commandery of the Castello of the Order of St. Lazarus

Technical details
- Material: Limestone

Castello Lanzun, also known as Lanzun Tower (Maltese: Torri ta' Lanzun), is a 15th-century fortified farmhouse in the Mensija area of the town of San Ġwann in Malta. It serves as the headquarters of the Malta-Paris obedience of the Military and Hospitaller Order of Saint Lazarus of Jerusalem.

== History ==
Castello Lanzun was originally built in the 15th century as a farmhouse. It gets its name from Wenzu Lanzun (Lorenzo Lanzon), a man from Birgu who lived there during the 1676 plague epidemic.

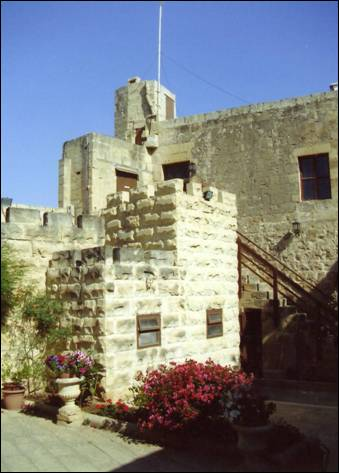
Castello Lanzun's courtyard

The farmhouse was modified and enlarged in 1713, and it was fortified so as to be able to provide refuge for the local population in case of a corsair raid. It was also used as a hunting lodge by the Grand Master of the Order of St. John.

In World War II, the building served as an observation post to identify approaching enemy aircraft, and it was severely damaged by aerial bombardment.

In 1972, the farmhouse was purchased by Robert Gayre, who restored the building and handed it to the Malta obedience of the Military and Hospitaller Order of St. Lazarus of Jerusalem. It was formally inaugurated as the Order's official headquarters on 12 May 1973 by Grand Master Francisco de Borbón y Borbón. The property is in the custody of the Grand Commandery of the Castello (formerly the Commandery of Lochore).

The tower was visited by Patriarch Gregory III Laham on 17 April 2010. The 40th anniversary of the inauguration of the tower was celebrated in May 2013 with a visit by Grand Master Carlos Gereda y de Borbón and other members of the Order.

== Architecture ==
Castello Lanzun is an example of traditional Maltese architecture, consisting of a number of rooms around a central courtyard. The building contains a chapel and a large meeting hall known as the Knights' Hall, which was originally the stables.
