= Paul Watrin =

Paul Watrin (1876–1950) was a French lawyer, Doctor of Law at University of Paris, advocate at the Paris Appeal Court, historian and writer.

He was a prominent Roman Catholic figure in the Council of Officers behind the statutes of Order of Saint Lazarus (statuted 1910) promulgated in 1910 in Paris, France.

== Biography ==
Born into a family of lawyers and of Alsatian family background, his father Charles, a Bonapartist, was a former officer in the Cent-gardes Squadron, an elite cavalry corps of the Second French Empire primarily responsible for protecting the person of the Emperor Napoleon III, as well as providing security within the Tuileries Palace.

Paul Watrin headed the Archaeological Society of France (1916–1946), founded in 1816, and directed its organ Historical Science.

He became a Doctor of Law at University of Paris with his thesis La Tradition monarchique d'apres l'ancien droit public (English translation: The monarchical tradition) (1916). The thesis of his at Sorbonne played a prominent role in the history of contemporary legitimism and became a major instrument in the legal battle against the Orleanism.

He married the Tremblaye Gallery, with whom he got an only son, Jacques, to whom he dedicated his doctoral thesis.

== Bibliography ==
- Guy Augé, préface de la seconde édition de La Tradition monarchique de Paul Watrin, 1916, Diffusion Université-Culture, Paris 1983
