= Jan Dobrzenský z Dobrzenicz =

Czech-French noble

His Excellency Jan Nepomuk Josef IV. Dobrzenský GCLJ, KCSG
- 50th Grand Master of the Orléans obedience of the Order of Saint Lazarus
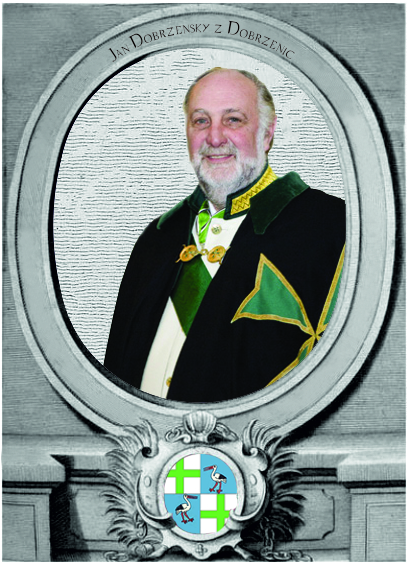
- Elected: 20 November 2010
- In office: 2010–2023
- Predecessor: Prince Charles-Philippe d'Orléans, Duke of Anjou
- Successor: Prince François d'Orléans, Count of Dreux

Personal details
- Born: 14 June 1946 (age 79) Prague, Czech Republic
- Denomination: Roman Catholic
- Residence: Chotěboř, Czech Republic
- Profession: Banker
- Education: INSEAD
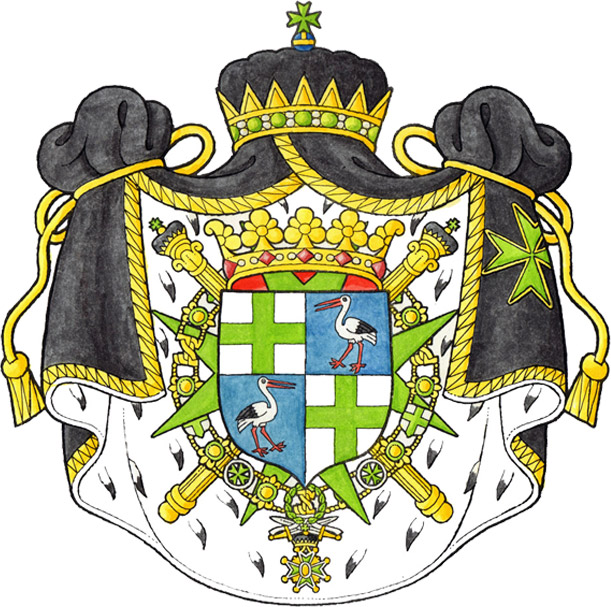
- Coat of arms

Count Jan Nepomuk Josef IV. Dobrzenský z Dobrzenicz (born 14 June 1946 in Prague, Czech Republic) is a Czech-French count. He served as the 50th Grand Master of the Orléans obedience of the Order of Saint Lazarus from 2010 to 2023.

== Biography ==
Jan Dobrzenský z Dobrzenicz was born on 14 June 1946 in Prague, Czechoslovakia, from an ancient comital Czech noble family. The family escaped from communist Czechoslovakia in 1948. Dobrzensky grew up in Canada, and later in France. Education: grade school, high school in Canada, Kepner, then higher education in Paris: Tregoe Business Management 1974, Paris, M.B.A. from CEDEP, Fontainebleau, in 1983, and Institut de Finance in 1988.

He is a citizen of France and the Czech Republic, living after return from exile in Chotěboř, Czech Republic. He is married with four children.

Dobrzenský was appointed a Knight Commander of the Order of St. Gregory the Great in 2016.

== Order of Saint Lazarus ==
Since 1976, Dobrzenský has been a member of the Orléans obedience of the Order of Saint Lazarus (since 2004). In recent years, he held the office of Grand Prior of Bohemia, and President of the Order's governing council of the obedience he belongs to.

In March 2010, Prince Charles Philippe, Duke of Anjou decided to step down from his position as Grand Master of this obedience for personal reasons, while maintaining his participation in the Order's activities in the capacity of Grand Master Emeritus, Grand Prior of France, and chairman of the Order's governing council. He was replaced at that time by Dobrzenský as Grand Master. In March 2023 he decided to step down from his position as Grand Master. He was succeeded by Prince François d'Orléans, Count of Dreux in September 2023.

== Gallery ==
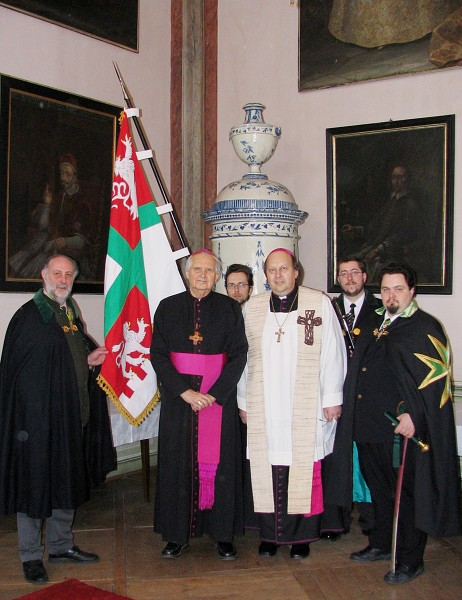
Jan Dobrzenský (at left) with Josef Koukl, Pavel Posád and Miroslav Šantin (Litoměřice, 2005)

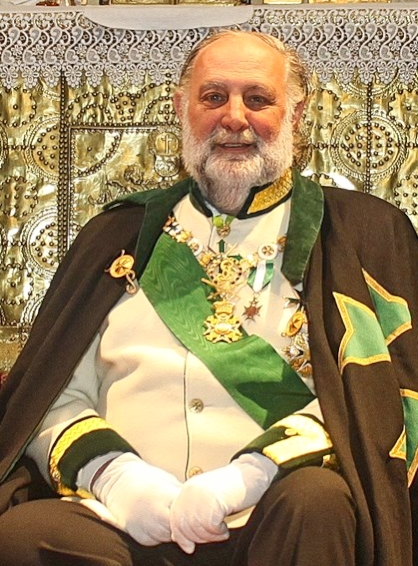
Portrait in June 2012
