= Charles Otzenberger-Detaille =

French wine merchant

Charles Otzenberger-Detaille, né Charles Otzenberger (1881-1944) was a French wine merchant from Colmar, Alsace, France.

Otzenberger-Detaille joined the Order of Saint Lazarus (statuted 1910) after the promulgation of its statutes of 1910, and became an instrumental part of its magistracy.

He also joined Société archéologique de France in 1921.

After having married Germaine Detaille (1886-1980), the niece of academic artist Edouard Detaille (1848–1912), he subsequently called himself Otzenberger-Detaille.

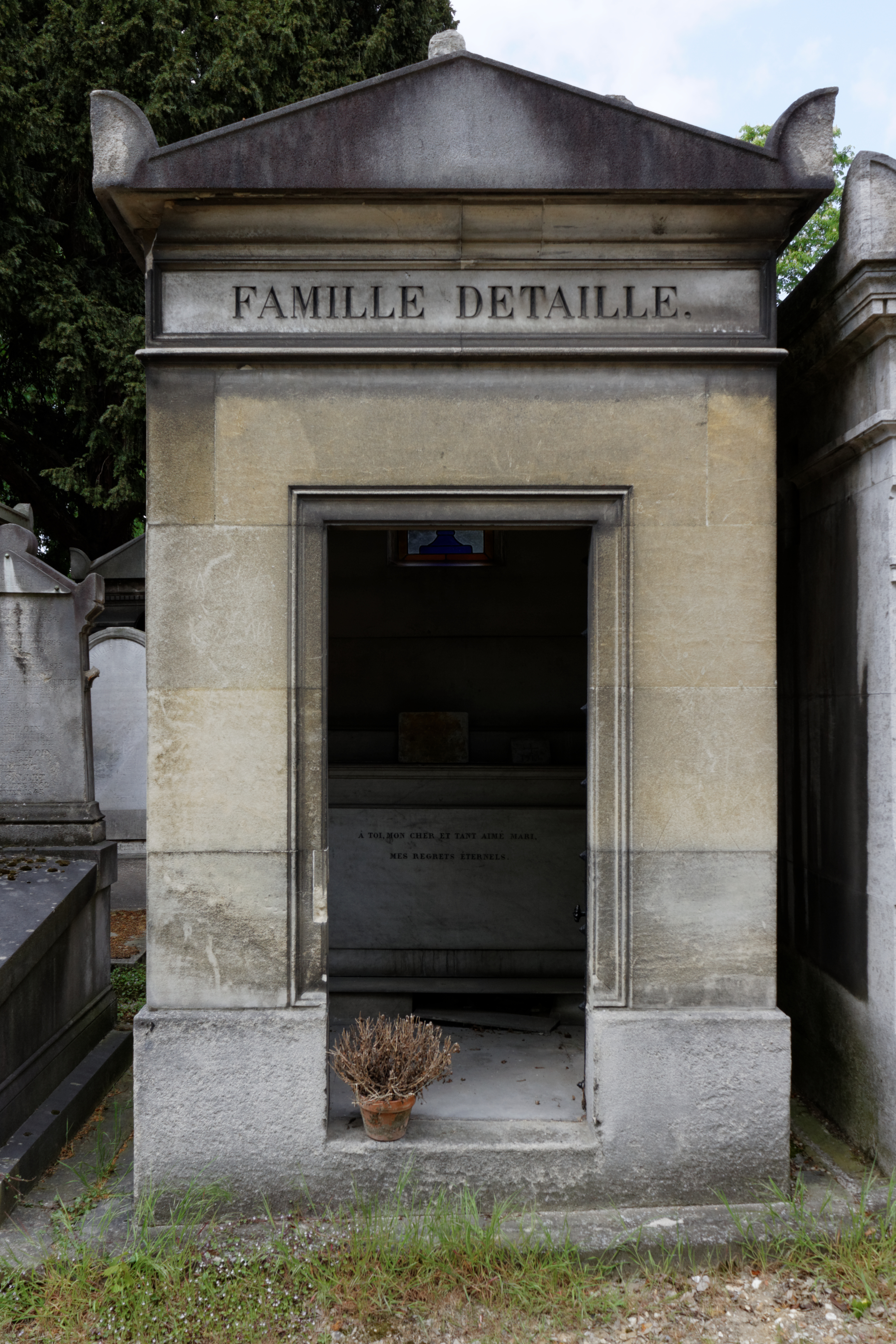
Tomb of Detaille family at Père Lachaise Cemetery (66e division), Paris, France, where Charles Otzenberger-Detaille is buried.

He died in 1944, buried in the Detaille family tomb.
