= Royal Military and Hospitaller Order of Our Lady of Mount Carmel and Saint Lazarus of Jerusalem united =

French chivalric order started in 1608

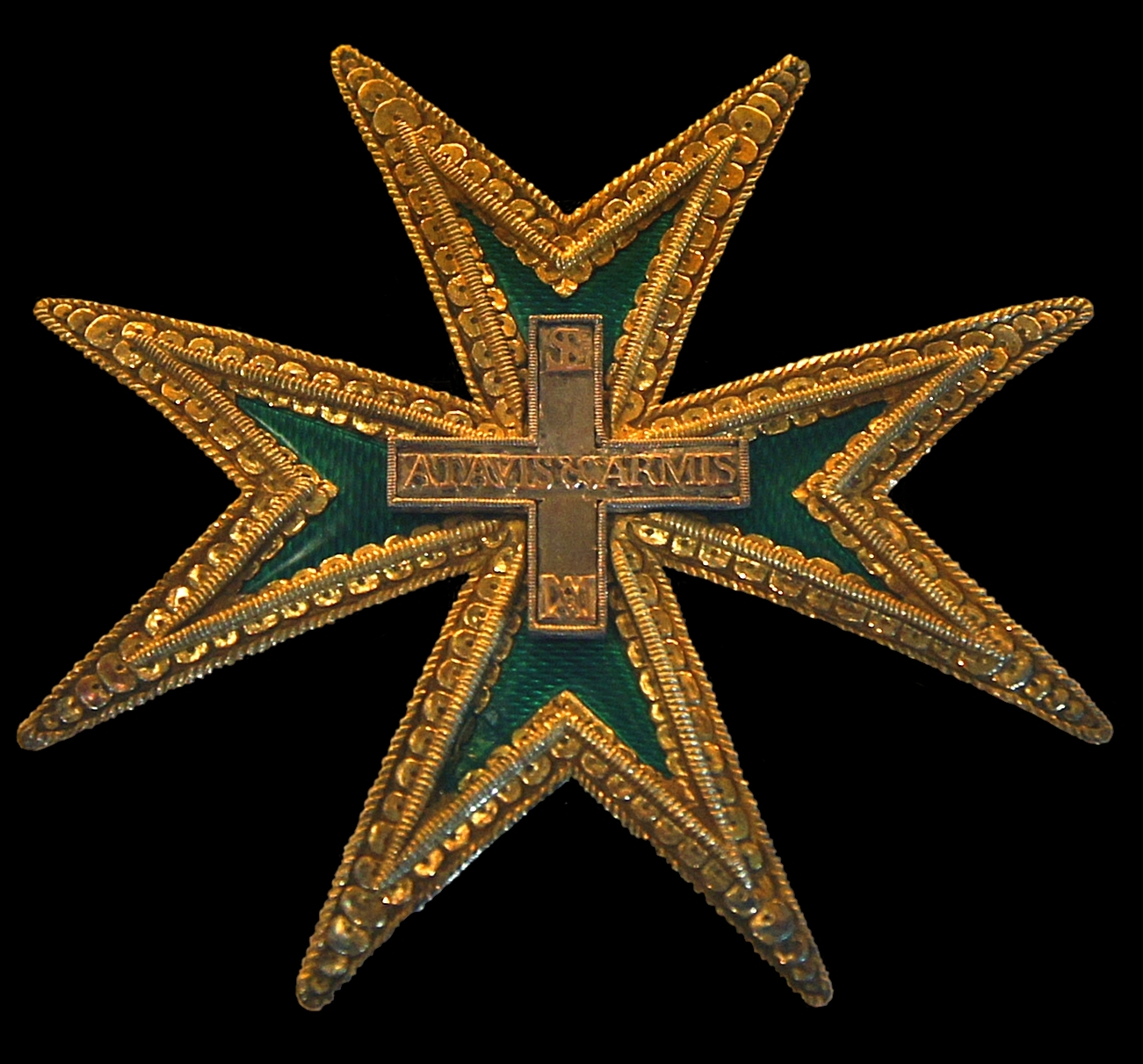
- Cross of the order

Awarded by the King of France
- Type: Order of chivalry
- Established: 1608
- Status: Extinct
- Founder: Henry IV of France

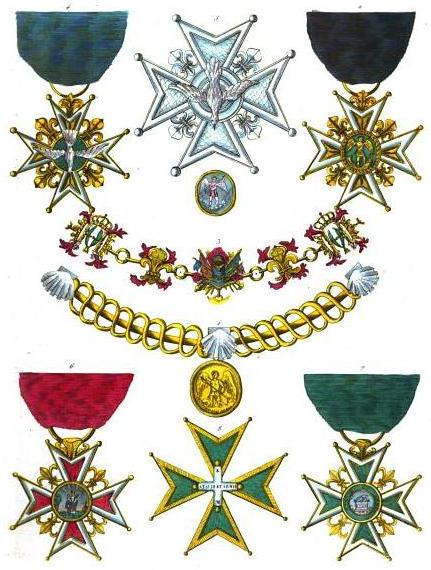
Insignia of the order (on bottom row)

The Royal Military and Hospitaller Order of Our Lady of Mount Carmel and Saint Lazarus of Jerusalem united (French: Ordre royal militaire et hospitalier de Notre-Dame du Mont-Carmel et de Saint-Lazare de Jérusalem réuni) was a chivalric order instituted in 1608 by personal union of the medieval Order of Saint Lazarus in France and the new Order of Our Lady of Mount Carmel of King Henry IV of France. The union of the two orders was recognised by a bull of Cardinal Louis de Bourbon, papal legate in France, dated 5 June 1668.

After the turmoil of the French Revolution, the order ceased to enjoy royal protection in 1830.

== Claims of legacy ==
The modern ecumenical schisms of the Order of Saint Lazarus (statuted 1910) claim legacy from the suppressed French branch. One group is under the spiritual protection of the Patriarch of the Melkite Greek Catholic Church. Another is under the protection of Henri d'Orléans, the Orléanist claimant to the former crown of France, with spiritual protection under a Roman Catholic cardinal. The Catholic Church does not formally recognize these factions nor any other non-Vatican sanctioned order regardless of dynastic claim, pedigree, or foundational antiquity (e.g. Order of Saints Maurice and Lazarus or the Sacred Military Constantinian Order of Saint George).

The different current Military and Hospitaller Orders of Saint Lazarus of Jerusalem maintain that after 1830, the French foundation of the Order of Saint Lazarus continued under the governance of a council of officers under the protection of the Melkite Patriarchy. Documentation to the subsequent decades of the 19th century is scant and equivocal, but the order is alleged to have been active philanthropically in Haifa in the mid-19th century, while contemporary biographies do mention late 19th-century individuals as having been members of the Hospitaller Nobles of St. Lazarus. The name Order of Saint Lazarus then appeared again in 1910 with new statutes.

Charles Savona-Ventura, grand archivist and historian of the order, holds that it remained under apostolic authority since the Holy See did not promulgate any contrarius actus in respect to either of the two orders during the late 18th and 19th centuries. However, Charles Moeller and Michael Foster writing in 1911 maintain that the order was extinct after 1824 with the death of King Louis XVIII, ignoring the fact that the French Almanach Royal continues to list King Charles X as the order's protector until 1830. It is also true, that Roman Canon 120 §1 and §2 specifies that unless an order is explicitly abolished by the Vatican (which never happened) it continues on as a canonical entity for at least 100 years after the death of its last knight who was the Marquis des Gouttes, who died in 1857. This assured the order's lawful existence until at least 1957 giving it time to find a protector and to reorganize, which it did several times right through the 19th century until its secularization in 1910 - see "Order of Saint Lazarus (statuted 1910)". There remain authors such as Guy Stair Sainty who in spite of the legal and documentary evidence continue to challenge the legitimacy of the contemporary organisations claiming to be the 'Order of Saint Lazarus'.

== See also ==
- Order of Saint Lazarus
- Historical orders, decorations, and medals of France

== Literature ==
- Olivier Chebrou de Lespinats (2011) Chronologie historique de l'Ordre de Saint-Lazare de Jérusalem (1099-2012), Historimes, ISBN 2-9519131-6-8
- Peter Bander van Duren, Orders of Knighthood and of Merit The Pontifical, Religious and Secularised Catholic-founded Orders and their relationship to the Apostolic See, 1995,
- Henry-Merchior de Langle et Jean-Louis de Treourret de Kerstrat, Les Ordres de Saint-Lazare de Jérusalem et de Notre-Dame du Mont-Carmel aux XVII^{e} et XVIII^{e} siècles, Paris, 1992.
- Gautier de Sibert, Histoire des Ordres royaux hospitaliers-militaires de Notre-Dame du Mont-Carmel et de Saint-Lazare de Jérusalem, Paris, 1772, réédité 1983
- Bernard Barbiche, Les Institutions de la monarchie française à l'époque moderne, Paris, PUF, 1999. 2^{e} édition 2001.
