= Grand Master of the Order of Saint Lazarus (statuted 1910) =

The grand master of the Order of Saint Lazarus (statuted 1910) is the leader of a confraternal order claiming legacy and contingency to the medieval Catholic military order known as the Order of Saint Lazarus. The Holy See does not recognize any other organization using the name "Order of Saint Lazarus" as a legitimate order of chivalry outside of the Order of Saints Maurice and Lazarus of the House of Savoy.

During the period from 1814 to 1841, the order was under the direction of a Council of Officers, with King Louis XVIII (1814–1824) and King Charles X (1824–1831) as protectors of the order. It was then passed on, evolving into the current list of grand masters.

== Council of Officers ==
The order lost its royal protection in 1831 but continued to function under the direction of the Council of Officers.

Order	Name	Image	Title	Date installed	Term ended	Term of office	Comments	Notes
	Claude-Louis, Prince de la Châtre		Administrator General de Ordres Royaux, Militaires et Hospitaliers de Notre-Dame du Mont-Carmel et de Saint-Lazare de Jérusalem Réunis	1814	1824	9–10 years		
	Jean-Louis de Beaumont, Marquis d'Autichamp		President of the Council of Officers de Ordres Royaux, Militaires et Hospitaliers de Notre-Dame du Mont-Carmel et de Saint-Lazare de Jérusalem Réunis	1824	1831	6–7 years	Members of the Council of Officers (1831-1841): Father Picot, Comte Vincent Vienot de Vaublanc, Baron de Silvestre.	
			Members of the Council of Officers de Ordres Royaux, Militaires et Hospitaliers de Notre-Dame du Mont-Carmel et de Saint-Lazare de Jérusalem Réunis	1831	1841	9–10 years	Members of the Council of Officers: Father Picot, Comte Vincent Vienot de Vaublanc, Baron de Silvestre.	

== Order of Saint Lazarus in the modern era ==
The period following the loss of temporal protection by the French Royal Family in 1831 until 1910 was controversial. Some argue that the order did not survive, while others argue that the period is, at best, shrouded in mystery, as no contemporary documentation appears to have survived.

The issue was resolved, on the one hand, by H.R.H. Henri d'Orléans, Count of Paris, Duke of France, Head of the Royal House of France, who in 2004 reinstated the temporal protection of the Royal House of France over the Order of Saint Lazarus, and on the other hand by the Melkite Patriarch of Antioch Gregory III Laham, who on 27 May 2012 confirmed the uninterrupted protection of the Melkite Patriarchs of Antioch over the Order of Saint Lazarus from 1841 onwards.

Modern tradition of the order maintains that, after 1841, the Melkite Greek Catholic Patriarchs assumed the leadership of the order, as Hospitaller Nobles of Saint Lazarus.

Order	Name	Image	Title	Date installed	Term ended	Term of office	Comments	Notes
	Patriarch Maximos III Mazloum		Administrator General of the Order of the Hospitallers of Saint Lazarus	1841	1855	13–14 years		
	Patriarch Clement Bahous		Administrator General of the Order of the Hospitallers of Saint Lazarus	1856	1864	7–8 years		
	Patriarch Gregorios II Youssef-Sayour		Administrator General of the Order of the Hospitallers of Saint Lazarus	1864	1898	33–34 years		
	Patriarch Peter IV Geraigiri		Administrator General of the Order of the Hospitallers of Saint Lazarus	1898	1902	3–4 years		
	Patriarch Cyril VIII Geha		Administrator General of the Order of the Hospitallers of Saint Lazarus	1902	1910	7–8 years		
	Patriarch Cyril VIII Geha		Protector of the Military and Hospitaller Order of Saint Lazarus of Jerusalem	1910	1916	5–6 years	In 1910, new statutes were promulgated whereby the management was assumed by the Council of Officers, while the Melkite Patriarch assumed the position of Protector. In 1935, a new Grand Master was appointed.	
	Patriarch Dimitrios I Cadi		Protector of the Military and Hospitaller Order of Saint Lazarus of Jerusalem	1919	1925	5–6 years	In 1910, new statutes were promulgated whereby the management was assumed by the Council of Officers, while the Melkite Patriarch assumed the position of Protector. In 1935, a new Grand Master was appointed.	
	Patriarch Cyril IX Moghabghab		Protector of the Military and Hospitaller Order of Saint Lazarus of Jerusalem	1925	1935	9–10 years	In 1910, new statutes were promulgated whereby the management was assumed by the Council of Officers, while the Melkite Patriarch assumed the position of Protector. In 1935, a new Grand Master was appointed.	
44	Francisco de Borbón y de la Torre, Duke of Seville (jure uxoris)		Grand Master of the Military and Hospitaller Order of Saint Lazarus of Jerusalem	1935	1952	16–17 years	Grand Bailiff of Spain, nominated as Lieutenant General of the Grand Magistry in 1930, then elected as Grand Master in 1935.	
45	Francisco de Borbón y Borbón		Grand Master of the Military and Hospitaller Order of Saint Lazarus of Jerusalem	1956	1967	10–11 years	Son and Coadjutor of Francisco de Borbón y de la Torre. Nominated as Lieutenant General of the Grand Magistry, then elected as Grand Master in 1956.	
46	Prince Charles-Philippe d'Orléans, Duke of Nemours, First Prince of the Blood of France		Grand Master of the Military and Hospitaller Order of Saint Lazarus of Jerusalem	1967	1970	2–3 years	Also served as Bailiff of the Sovereign Military Order of Malta.	
In 1969, internal strife split the Order into two fractions: the Malta Obedience and the Paris Obedience. Each had its own separate administrators and Grand Masters.

=== Malta obedience ===
Order	Name	Image	Title	Date installed	Term ended	Term of office	Comments	Notes
47	Francisco de Borbón y Borbón		Grand Master of the Military and Hospitaller Order of Saint Lazarus of Jerusalem in Malta	1973	1995	21–22 years	Also served as Bailiff of the Sovereign Military Order of Malta.	
48	Francisco de Borbón y Escasany, 5th Duke of Seville		Grand Master of the Military and Hospitaller Order of Saint Lazarus of Jerusalem in Malta	1996	2008	11–12 years	Son of Francisco de Borbón y Borbón; appointed Grand Master Emeritus in 2008.	

=== Paris obedience ===
Order	Name	Image	Title	Date installed	Term ended	Term of office	Comments	Notes
47	Pierre de Cossé, 12th Duke of Brissac		Grand Master of the Military and Hospitaller Order of Saint Lazarus of Jerusalem in Paris	1969	1986	16–17 years	Previously served as Administrator General (1956–1969).	
48	François de Cossé, 13th Duke of Brissac		Grand Master of the Military and Hospitaller Order of Saint Lazarus of Jerusalem in Paris	1986	2006	19–20 years	Son of Pierre de Cossé; appointed Grand Master Emeritus.	
In 2004, strife within the Paris Obedience led to a further split that was to assume the name of the Orleáns Obedience. In 2008, the old Malta and Paris Obediences reunited under a new Grand Master, with the previous Grand Masters being appointed emeriti. The Melkite Patriarch Gregory III Laham remained the Spiritual Protector of the Order until he was succeeded by Patriarch Youssef Absi.								

=== Malta-Paris obedience (reunification of the former Malta and Paris obediences) ===
Order	Name	Image	Title	Date installed	Term ended	Term of office	Comments	Notes
49	Carlos Gereda y de Borbón, Marqués de Almazán (jure uxoris)		Grand Master of the Military and Hospitaller Order of Saint Lazarus of Jerusalem	2008	2017	17–18 years	He took the solemn oath in Manchester Cathedral, England.	
50	Francisco de Borbón Graf von Hardenberg		Grand Master of the Military and Hospitaller Order of Saint Lazarus of Jerusalem	2018	incumbent	7–8 years	Son of Francisco de Borbón y Escasany; elected and installed as Grand Master in Madrid on May 5, 2018.	

=== Orléans obedience (since 2004) ===
Order	Name	Image	Title	Date installed	Term ended	Term of office	Comments	Notes
49	Charles-Philippe d'Orléans		Grand Master of the Military and Hospitaller Order of Saint Lazarus of Jerusalem in Orleáns	2004	2010	5–6 years	Re-established the temporal protection of the Head of the Royal House of France. Resigned; now Grand Master Emeritus.	
50	Count Jan Dobrzenský		Grand Master of the Military and Hospitaller Order of Saint Lazarus of Jerusalem in Orleáns	2010	2023	15–16 years	Resigned; now Grand Master Emeritus.	
51	François d'Orléans		Grand Master of the Military and Hospitaller Order of Saint Lazarus of Jerusalem in Orleáns	2023	Incumbent	2–3 years	Installed as Grand Master at Maredsous Abbey in Belgium on September 16, 2023.	
