= Order of Saint Lazarus (statuted 1910) =

Charitable order

Military and Hospitaller Order of Saint Lazarus of Jerusalem
- Coat of arms of the order
- Abbreviation: OSLJ
- Established: 1910
- Type: Confraternal order
- Legal status: Incorporated in various countries, but disputed by some historians
- Purpose: "Care and assistance of the sick and the poor, and to the support and defense of the Christian faith and the traditions and principles of Christian chivalry"
- Headquarters: 1. Malta-Paris: Madrid, Spain; 2. Orléans: Orléans, France; 3. Jerusalem: Kaiserstuhl, Switzerland
- Members: open to Christians by invitation
- Official language: 1. Malta-Paris: English, French, German, Spanish; 2. Orléans: French, English
- Grand master: 1. Malta-Paris: Francisco de Borbón Graf von Hardenberg; 2. Orléans: Prince François d'Orléans, Count of Dreux; 3. Jerusalem: Prince Sixtus Henry of Bourbon-Parma
- Spiritual protector: 1. Malta-Paris: Patriarch Youssef Absi (Melkite Greek Catholic); 2. Orléans: Cardinal Antoine Kambanda (Roman Catholic); 3. Jerusalem: Bishop Richard Garrard (Anglican)
- Secessions: 2004 – Orléans obedience; 2010 – Jerusalem obedience
- Website: 1. Malta-Paris: st-lazarus.net; 2. Orléans: orderofsaintlazarus.com; 3. Jerusalem: saint-lazare.org

The Military and Hospitaller Order of Saint Lazarus of Jerusalem (Latin: Ordo Militaris et Hospitalis Sancti Lazari Hierosolymitani) is a Christian order that was statuted in 1910 by a council of Catholics in Paris, France, initially under the protection of Patriarch Cyril VIII Geha of the Melkite Greek Catholic Church. The Order was officially recognised by the Spanish state in 1940 (Boletin oficial del Estado num. 131 de fecha 10 de mayo de 1940, pp. 3177–3178). During the 1920s, it expanded its jurisdiction and enrolled members from other countries in Europe and in the Americas. It re-established the office of grand master in 1935, linking the office to members of the Spanish branch of the House of Bourbon. It assumed an ecumenical dimension during the 1950s to expand its membership to individuals of other Trinitarian Christian denominations in British Commonwealth countries.

Owing to an internal schism in 1969, the order became divided into two competing "obediences", known as the Malta Obedience and the Paris Obedience. In 2008, these rival obediences were reconciled and reunited into a single order once again, led at that time by Carlos Gereda y de Borbón as grand master, and with the spiritual protection of the (now former) Patriarch Gregory III Laham of the Melkite Greek Catholic Church. However, during the period of separation, the Paris Obedience had experienced further schisms, with the creation in 1995 of the United Grand Priories of the Hospitaller Order of Saint Lazarus (led at that time by John Baron von Hoff), and in 2004 of the Orléans Obedience (led at that time by Prince Charles-Philippe d'Orléans under the protection of Henri d'Orléans, Count of Paris). The latter group then experienced a schism in 2010, resulting in the creation of the Jerusalem Obedience (led by Prince Sixtus Henry of Bourbon-Parma).

== Claims to regularity ==
The modern Order of Saint Lazarus claims to maintain the spirit and history of the medieval Order of Saint Lazarus and claims a historical continuity to the French branch of the medieval order through the 17th to 19th century Royal Military and Hospitaller Order of Our Lady of Mount Carmel and Saint Lazarus of Jerusalem united under the fons honorum of the Holy See until the publication of the Papal Bull De Equestribus Pontificus by Pope Pius X in 1905 which defined the future pontifical orders without formally abolishing any of the other previously extant orders. The promulgation of the 1905 bull led the Council of the Order of Saint Lazarus to re-organize itself and become secularized under the protection of the Melkite Patriarchy formally statuting these changes in 1910. The basis of the current Order of St Lazarus's origin, and the authority for its statuting in 1910, has attracted controversy.

In 1608/1609, the French branch of the medieval Order of St Lazarus was canonically linked with the newly pontifically created Order of Our Lady of Mount Carmel, forming the Royal Military and Hospitaller Order of Our Lady of Mount Carmel and Saint Lazarus of Jerusalem united under the patronage of the reigning French king. This administrative inter-relationship between these two orders, both under the fons honorum of the Holy See, was canonically recognised in 1668 by a bull issued by the Holy See legate for France, Cardinal Louis de Vendôme, and eventually by Pope Innocent XII in 1695. The united orders continued to enjoy royal favour until the turmoil of the French Revolution (1789–1799) put an end to formal admission ceremonies to the Order of Saint Lazarus, though King Louis XVIII, previously grand master of the order, admitted a number of knights while in exile. With the Bourbon Restoration, King Louis XVIII and his successor King Charles X both served as protectors of the order which continued to function under the management of a council of officers.

In 1831, the order lost its royal protection but was not abolished, since being originally a papal-established order only the pope could exclusively abolish the order by a specific contrarius actus. This has never been forthcoming and hence the regulations relating to the order fall under the precepts of canon law which allows for an order to become extinct 100 years after the deaths of its last member. The last living member admitted before the French Revolution died in 1856. Hence, according to canon law, the order would have only become extinct in 1956. It has been argued that this itself was sufficient to allow the existence of the order right through the nineteenth and early twentieth centuries.

Contemporary documentation confirms that the order was active philanthropically in the mid-nineteenth century in Haifa; while definite admissions were made in the late nineteenth century apparently by Pope Pius IX who used the award to reward his Zouaves supporters.

The historical events following the loss of French Royal patronage in 1830 can only be left to traditional history and conjecture. It is claimed that in the 1840s, the Council of Officers of the order sought patronage from the Melkite patriarchy. Tradition holds that this reorganization came in 1841 under the aegis of Francophile Melkite Patriarch Maximos III. The evidence for this, albeit quite plausible, is circumstantial due to the destruction of pertinent records during the 1860 Druze/Marionite Mount Lebanon conflagration and further ruination of Patriarchal papers at Al-Ain in the 1983 civil war. Nevertheless, a reorganization indisputably occurred under Patriarch Cyril VIII who became the order's protector for a while in 1911 as did later patriarchs—all safely before the canonical extinction year of 1957. The debate about the historicity of the 1841 Melkite protection is moot, as the Declaration of Kevelaer in 2012 issued by Patriarch Gregorios III Laham, the previous Melkite patriarch granting authority, confirms, by affidavit, the 1841 advent of the Melkite protection.

The 1910 reorganization is stated by the order to have been within the framework of the Roman Canonical continuation of the order (Canon 120 §1 and §2) which was never abolished by the Vatican. Consequently, St. Lazarus continued as a creature of canon law for 100 years after the death of the last knight admitted during the ancien regime, the Marquis des Gouttes, who passed in 1857 assuring the order's continuation until 1957, arguably buying time to find a protector and to reorganize. It is relevant that no pope has ever ordered a Melkite patriarch to desist in this protection of the Order of St. Lazarus (which popes had previously done for other orders) and Peter van Duren emphasized that "only a papal interdict against the order of St. Lazarus or the Patriarch could have prevented him [any Patriarch] from agreeing to become the spiritual Protector of the Order". A grand magistracy was re-established in 1935 with the appointment of Francisco de Borbón y de la Torre.

Notably, no matter if the modern establishment is to be attributed to 1841 under the patriarch, to 1910 under the council of officers, or to 1935 under the re-erected grand magistracy of Francisco de Borbón y de la Torre – whether considered laicized or not – the enact would arguably not strictly be contrary to canon law.

== Present legal status ==
The Military and Hospitaller Order of Saint Lazarus of Jerusalem has since its reunification striven to change its structure to suit the modern world organizing itself into a formal legal foundation to better function within the framework requirements demanded of associations and non-governmental organizations by the modern world. Since 2005, the order has operated as a registered company in the United Kingdom defined as an unincorporated or voluntary association constituted under the constitution adopted in 2006. In 2014, steps were undertaken to set up a private foundation to serve as a non-profit organization regulated by Spanish legal provisions. The International Hospitaller Foundation of Saint Lazarus of Jerusalem serves to coordinate worldwide initiatives involving assistance, healthcare, attending the sick and needy, and promoting humanism and Christian values carried out by organizations of different nationalities under the banner of St Lazarus. To further ensure a legally-sound internationally functioning organization, the order has encouraged its various jurisdictions to ensure their legal status within the country they function and enter into a memorandum of association with the International Hospitaller Foundation.

=== International Commission on Order of Chivalry ===
The modern order is recognized by many ecclesial, royal, noble, princely and reigning and non reigning royal dignitaries. Nevertheless, private, self-appointed, non-governmental bodies such as the Académie Internationale d'Héraldique, International Academy of Genealogy, a private organization created in 1998 founded by self proclaimed heraldist Jean-Marie Thiébaud, and the International Commission on Orders of Chivalry maintain incorrectly, without evidence and without head of state authority, that the modern Order of Saint Lazarus is only a revived self-styled order. A self-styled order or pseudo-chivalric order by definition is an organisation which claims to be a chivalric order, but is not recognised as legitimate by countries and heads of state. This footnote anonymous reference is based on opinions based on the incomplete history of the Order by Paul Bertrand written in 1932.

The International Commission on Orders of Chivalry (ICOC), a private organization with no state authority, formed to charge fees for approving orders of chivalry, does not include the MHOLJ on its Provisional List of Orders (2010) arguing that:

Despite the claims of those who believe this Order continued to flourish during the 19th century, ICOC incorrectly claims there is no evidence to support such a survival, ignoring the Royal patronage from the Spanish Monarchy and ignoring the protection by the Melkite Church since 1841, claiming incorrectly that it would have had no legal or statutory basis; once again, ICOC incorrectly and without evidence maintains that the present body styling itself the Order of Saint Lazarus of Jerusalem is entirely a modern, 20th century, and private foundation.

It is relevant to note that in 1964–1999, ICOC was embroiled in several controversies caused by the different cultural training of its commissioners. The root of some of these controversies stems from the unavoidable bias inherent in the ICOC's governing structure as a private, non-governmental organization. The Commission despite its name, as a private body lacks any legal jurisdiction to unilaterally declare anything other than what amounts to a private opinion.

Accordingly, in France, the purported mother country of Saint Lazarus, there is no evidence or reference to the claim that the modern organization has been prohibited from using the designation 'order' and wearing chivalric insignia. Finally, the order was originally a religious foundation, established by papal bull and the grant of various privileges by successive popes, and the decision to allow the order to become extinct was not challenged by the Holy See which has repeatedly condemned the modern revival. This is obviously a false claim without reference or authorship needing a citation.

ICOC maintains the Order of Saint Lazarus cannot be considered an order of chivalry, a claim that has been debunked by serious research, including a recent study of the Order titled Exploring Legitimacy: The Controversial Case of the Order of St. Lazarus By. H. Wayne Nelson, Ph.D. and Michael Ross, M.D., Ph.D. The only thing ICOC correctly mentions is that the Order carries out praiseworthy charitable, humanitarian activity producing numerous contributions to social works and therefore it might be included in a category of organisations inspired by chivalry. This footnote reference does not identify its author.

=== Roman Catholic Church ===
The "condemnations" mentioned by the ICOC above were unofficially published in the L'Osservatore Romano, possibly in contravention of canon law, as the MHOLJ existed as Canonical entity until 1956.

Although no longer exclusively a Roman Catholic order of knighthood (being open to Christians of other denominations), it is, in many nations and sub-national jurisdictions, by canon law, considered to be an association of the faithful. Such is the case, for example, with the order in the Czech Republic, Poland and France.

However the order's modern ecumenical structure today makes it extraneous to canon law, though since Second Vatican Council, in the spirit of promoting ecumenism, the Holy See has promoted the right of recognition to institutions that do not fall strictly under the precepts of canon law. The Holy See has repeatedly felt the need to clarify the fact that the Order of Saint Lazarus no longer falls under its jurisdiction. It is however pertinent to point out that the Holy See does not recognize any order but its own equestrian orders, or those under its protection, and not a prerequisite for an Order of Chivalry (e.g., the Sovereign Military Order of Malta and the Order of the Holy Sepulchre).

Guy Stair Sainty claims that the Order of Saints Maurice and Lazarus is the legitimate dynastic order that is the successor of the medieval Lazarists, based on the 1572 Papal Bull issued by Pope Gregory XIII, which united the Italian branch of the Order of Saint Lazarus with the Order of Saint Maurice in perpetuity under the Grand Magistry of the Savoy dynasty. The Holy See, at present, is non-partisan in the issue of dynastic orders; it only recognizes the Sovereign Military Order of Malta, the Equestrian Order of the Holy Sepulchre, as well as "its own Equestrian Orders (the Supreme Order of Christ, the Order of the Golden Spur, the Pian Order, the Order of Saint Gregory the Great, and the Order of Pope Saint Sylvester)".

Internationally, the order's purpose is "care and assistance of the sick and the poor, and to the support and defense of the Christian faith and the traditions and principles of Christian chivalry." Some 5,000 members are divided under three grand magistries with strongly debated historical claims, yet carrying out "praiseworthy charitable, humanitarian activity". These widely lauded Hospitaller functions have led observers, like Augustan Society's Chivalry Committee chair Jean-Paul Gauthier de la Martiniere to declare that St. Lazarus is certainly "much more than a self-styled order."

In a note of clarification from the Secretariat of State, headed by the Cardinal Secretary of State, the Holy See has made an official statement clarifying that it only recognizes its own orders:

In response to frequent requests for information concerning the recognition by the Holy See of Equestrian Orders dedicated to the saints or to holy places, the Secretariat of State considers it opportune to reiterate what has already been published, namely that, other than its own Equestrian Orders (the Supreme Order of Christ, the Order of the Golden Spur, the Pian Order, the Order of Saint Gregory the Great, and the Order of Pope Saint Sylvester), the Holy See recognises and supports only the Sovereign Military Order of Malta – also known as the Sovereign Military Hospitaller Order of Saint John of Jerusalem of Rhodes and of Malta – and the Equestrian Order of the Holy Sepulchre of Jerusalem. The Holy See foresees no additions or innovations in this regard. All other orders, whether of recent origin or mediaeval foundation, are not recognised by the Holy See. Furthermore, the Holy See does not guarantee their historical or juridical legitimacy, their ends or organisational structures. To avoid any possible doubts, even owing to illicit issuing of documents or the inappropriate use of sacred places, and to prevent the continuation of abuses which may result in harm to people of good faith, the Holy See confirms that it attributes absolutely no value whatsoever to certificates of membership or insignia issued by these groups, and it considers inappropriate the use of churches or chapels for their so-called "ceremonies of investiture".

— Vatican Information Service, Holy See

Notwithstanding the controversy, ever since the statutes of 1910, a number of prominent Catholic prelates, including cardinals, have acted as chaplains in different positions of the order. The mainline united order enjoys as Spiritual Protector the Patriarch of Melkite Greek Catholic Church, Youssef Absi. On 27 May 2012, the previous Patriarch and Spiritual Protector of the order Gregory III Laham signed a declaration in Kevelaer, Germany, confirming the continuity of the order (under the now united Malta-Paris obedience) under the Patriarchs of Antioch since his predecessor Patriarch Maximos III Mazloum had accepted the role of Spiritual Protector of the order in 1841. Previously, Cardinal Basil Hume was a member of the order in England as is his successor Cardinal Cormac Murphy O'Connor. The Catholic Archbishop of Sydney, Cardinal George Pell is a former national chaplain and member of the order in Australia. The present Ecclesiastical Grand Prior of the order is Archbishop Michele Pennisi EGCLJ, the Archbishop of Monreale in Sicily, Italy.

First Spiritual Protector of the Orléans obedience was Cardinal László Paskai, former Primate of Hungary, from 2004 to 2012. His successor was Cardinal Dominik Duka as Spiritual Protector and Chaplain General from 2012 to 2021. In May 2021 Catholic Church in the Czech Republic revoked title of private association of Christians to the order in the country due to controversy of political disputes with the national branch of the Orleáns Obedience. From August 2022, Spiritual Protector and Chaplain General of the Orléans obedience is Cardinal Antoine Kambanda.

In Poland bishop Jan Tyrawa is spiritual prior; and for the Grand Priory of Monaco Dominique Rey, bishop of Fréjus-Toulon, is the Prelate Grand Cross.

=== National legal authorities ===
In Spain, the order received recognition from the state through a number of legal documents, though this organisation is not listed in the Orders, decorations, and medals of Spain. Peter Van Duren further cites a formal Croatian government proclamation attesting that the order is "as an Order of Knighthood legitimately active in the sovereign territory of Croatia". The Military and Hospitaller Order of St. Lazarus has been recognized by the Hungarian Republic as an order of knighthood on 28 August 1993 (confirmed on 9 September 2008 and again on 5 July 2011 when the appointment of Countess Éva Nyáry (Malta-Paris obedience) as the new Head of the Representative Office of the Military and Hospitaller Order of Saint Lazarus of Jerusalem in Hungary was formally accepted).

The Orleans obedience enjoys perceived recognition as per a government communiqué and other cooperation efforts in and of Czech Republic.

=== Royal patronage ===
The Orléans obedience claims the protection of Henri d'Orléans, Count of Paris. In 2004, the count of Paris allowed his nephew Prince Charles Philippe, Duke of Anjou to take the position of 49th grand master of the order in the Orléans obedience. Following the schism within the Paris obedience in 2004 that led to the establishment of the Orléans obedience under Prince Charles Philippe, Duke of Anjou, Henri d'Orléans, Count of Paris, head of the Orléanist branch of the House of Bourbon, re-established his temporal protection. In 2010, the prince resigned and then Count Jan Dobrzenský z Dobrzenicz was grand master of the Orléans obedience until his resignation in 2023. In the same year Prince François d'Orléans, Count of Dreux was installed as the grand master at Maredsous Abbey.

The King Juan Carlos I of Spain allowed his kinsmen Francisco de Borbón y Escasany, 5th Duke of Seville and Carlos Gereda y de Borbón to accept the position of grand master of the order. King Felipe VI of Spain has allowed his kinsman Francisco de Borbón y Hardenberg to succeed Carlos Gereda y de Borbón.

== History ==
=== Proposed early history of 1830–1910 ===
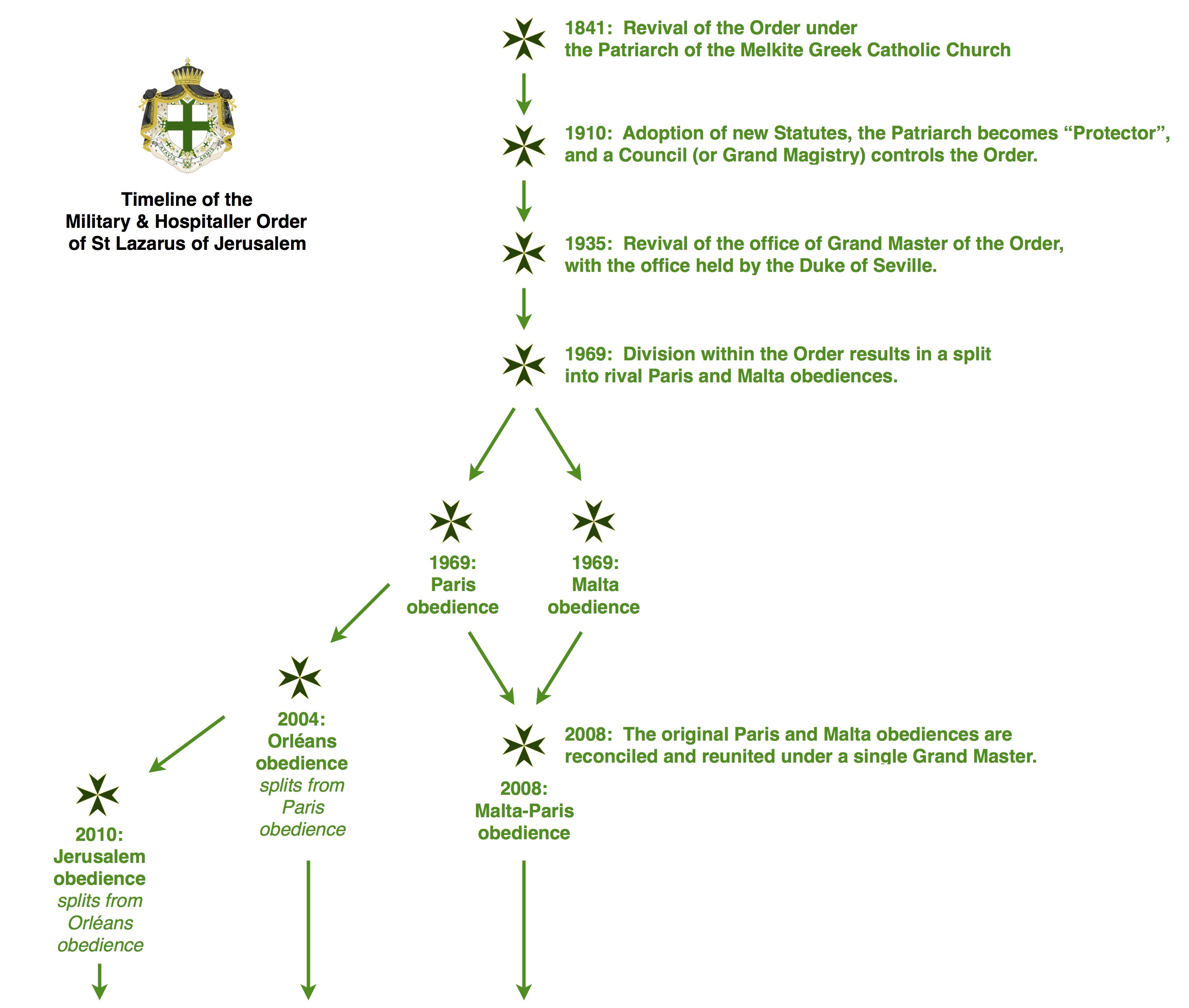
A summary timeline of the order, showing the relationships of the current rival obediences.

After 1830, the French foundation of the Order of Saint Lazarus allegedly continued under the governance of a Council of Officers.

In 1841, according to later dated church authorities, the council of officers invited the Patriarch of the Melkite Greek Catholic Church Maximos III Mazloum (1779–1855) to become spiritual protector of the order, thence re-establishing a tangible connection with the order's early roots in Jerusalem in the Holy Land.

Indications propose that members supported the rebuilding of the Mount Carmel Monastery in Haifa, Palestine, then under the responsibility of the Melkite Patriarch, while contemporary biographies indicate late 19th-century individuals as having been members of the Order of Saint Lazarus.

In the years that followed, according to the order's own accounts, new knights were admitted. These included admirals Ferdinand-Alphonse Hamelin and Louis Édouard Bouët-Willaumez (1853), comtes Louis François du Mesnil de Maricourt and Paul de Poudenx (1863), comte Jules Marie d'Anselme de Puisaye (1865), vicomte de Boisbaudry (1875), comte Jules Marie d'Anselme de Puisaye (1880 as a hospitaller while living in Tunisia), baron Yves de Constancin (1896), who was later to become commander of the Hospitaller Nobles of Saint Lazarus. The latter was also a knight of the Order of Isabella the Catholic and of Order of Saint Anna of Russia.

=== 1910–1961 ===
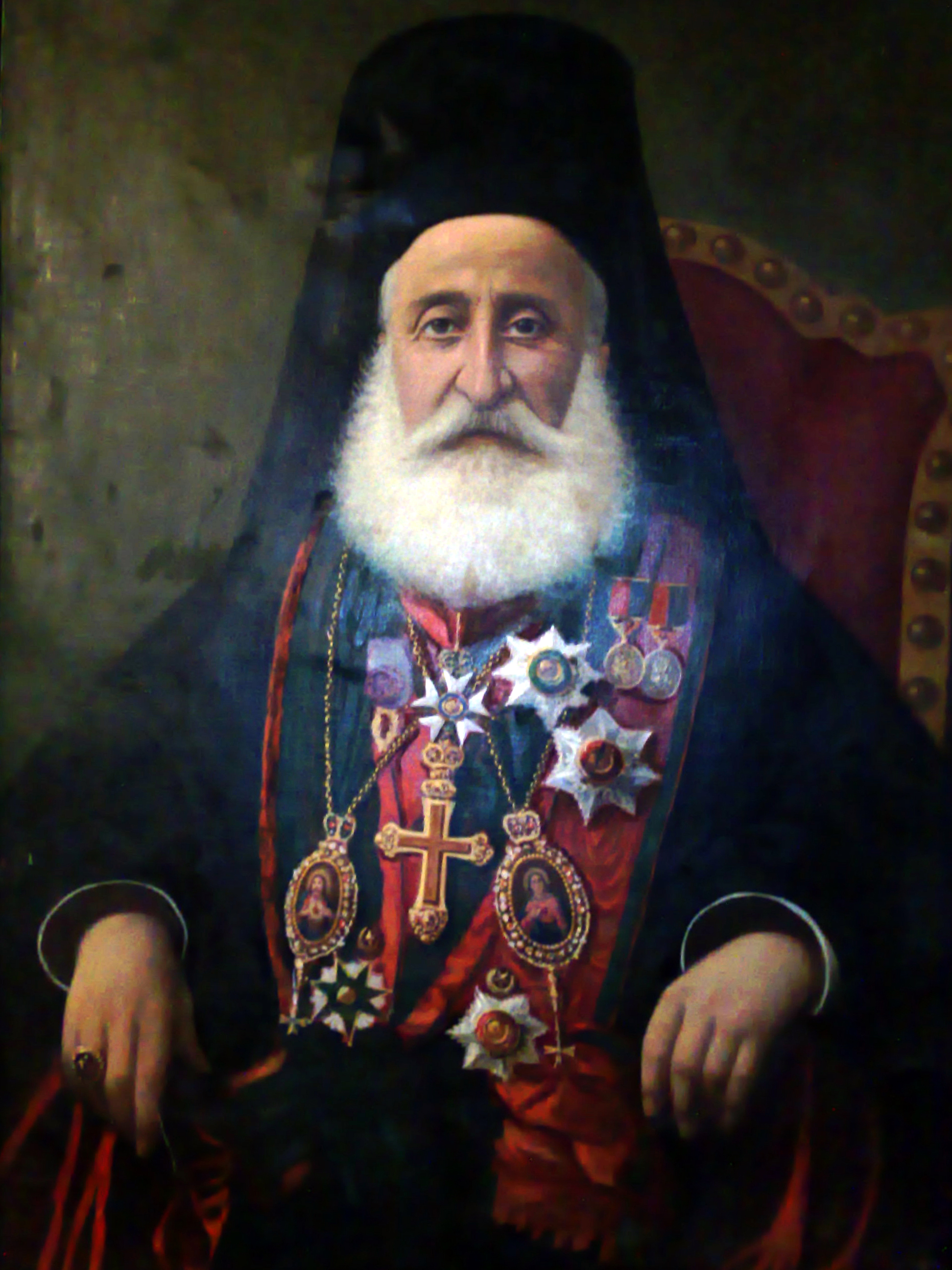
Patriarch Cyril VIII Jaha of the Melkite Greek Catholic Church, the order's spiritual protector (1910–1916).

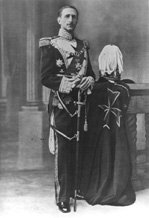
Francisco de Borbón y de la Torre, Duke of Seville, 44th grand master (1935–1952).

In 1910, a statute was promulgated by a Council of Officers composed of Catholics, subsequently including Paul Watrin, Anselme de la Puisaye, Alexandre Gallery de la Tremblaye, Charles Otzenberger-Detaille, as well as Polish Catholic priest John Tansky, among others. This statute explicitly placed the governance in the hands of the magistracy, whose decisions were sovereign and irrevocable, thus manifested as a laicised order, albeit with Patriarch Cyril VIII Jaha of the Melkite Greek Catholic Church as confirmed protector.

The order continually attracted members from the French nobility. By the early 20th century, it was attracting knights from further afield, notably Spain and Poland.

In 1935, Don Francisco de Borbón y de la Torre, Duke of Seville, grand bailiff of the order in Spain and lieutenant-general of the grand magistracy since 1930, was appointed as grand master (authorised so by his cousin, King Alfonso XIII of Spain) – thus, according to the order's account, re-establishing the office, vacant since 1814 following the French Revolution. Francisco de Borbón y de la Torre remained grand master of the order from 1935 to 1952.

Since then, grand masters from the House of Bourbon have continued at the helm of the order, except for a short interregnum, when the grand master belonged to the French Cossé-Brissac family. That occurred in 1969 with the election of the 12th Duke of Brissac as grand master, with the approval of the Count of Paris, head of the Royal House of France, solicited by the Patriarch Maximos V Hakim.

=== 1961 onwards; schisms and obediences ===
In 1961, Robert Gayre was appointed Bailiff and Commissioner-General for the order in the English-speaking world with responsibility for expanding the order's membership in that area. Up to then, non-Catholic Christians had been accepted only as affiliate members of the order. Gayre accepted the appointment on condition that henceforth Protestants would be eligible for full membership. The Paris authorities reluctantly agreed and Gayre took as a model to emulate the British Protestant Most Venerable Order of St. John. From this time, although the majority of its members and clergy remained Roman Catholic, the order began to identify itself as an ecumenical organisation.

==== 1969: Malta obedience and Paris obedience ====
In 1969, disagreement relating to the management and direction of the order led to a significant schism that resulted in two major branches, which came to be known as "obediences". The majority of the membership, including nearly all of the anglophone members, were led by a series of Spanish Borbón grand masters, and came to be known as the Malta obedience, as Gayre was headquartered there. The francophone members became the Paris obedience, led by successive Dukes of Brissac as grand master.

The decades that followed were punctuated by a series of attempts at reuniting the two branches, most significantly in 1986, when a significant portion of the anglophone membership in the Malta obedience (including most of those in the U.S.) rejoined the Paris obedience.

==== 2004: Orléans obedience ====
In 2004, the Paris obedience underwent a further schism, breaking off from the Duke of Brissac's leadership, with the formation of the Orléans obedience under the headship of Prince Charles-Philippe d'Orléans, Duke of Anjou. The Orléans obedience subsequently gained the temporal protection of the Head of the Royal House of France, Henri d'Orléans, Count of Paris, uncle of the Duke of Anjou.

In 2010, the Duke of Anjou resigned as 49th grand master to become grand master emeritus. He was succeeded by his maternal uncle, the Czech count Jan Dobrzenský.

In 2012, Henri d'Orléans, Count of Paris, temporarily removed his royal protection from the Orléans obedience. Again, on 31 January 2014, Henri d'Orléans expressly stated that only he can represent the Royal House of France and that "cette protection temporelle leur a été retirée par ma démission es qualités, notifiée à Pâques 2012. .... Toute référence à une quelconque protection temporelle actuelle de la Maison Royale de France, est donc pure affabulation et mensonge". which he reconstituted again, at least temporarily in February 2014.

However, on 8 September 2014, Henri d'Orléans restored his temporal protection of the Order of Saint Lazarus (by jus sanguinis) and attached it as a lieutenancy to his revival of the Order of Our Lady of Mount Carmel. He explained that this amalgamation was established to defend the cultural heritage of France and to assure that the Order of Saint Lazarus continues its hospitaller missions of mercy and care. A declaration published by the Order of Saint Lazarus by the Saint Lazarus Grand Magisterium, its Government Council and its Constitutional Council welcomed this amalgamation under Henri d'Orléans, Count of Paris, as affirming again "more than ever" the legitimacy of the order. An attached declaration confirmed that the protection of Saint Lazarus by the Royal House of France was represented within the order by the Duke of Anjou as grand master emeritus and grand prior of France. Moreover, the Count of Paris noted in his blog that the statutes of the ancient combined orders, as well as those of the attached lieutenancy of Saint Lazarus, were in accordance with the 1901 French law on associations, deposited and accepted by the Grand Chancellor of the National Order of the Legion of Honor.

There is no scholarly consensus of the exact scope of a dynast's fons hornorum. Some argue that the heads of formerly regnant houses, like the Count of Paris, by right of blood (jure sanguinis), can (jus honorum) even create or revive household orders moto proprio as an inviolable family prerogative. Prominent Italian jurist and president of chamber of the Italian Republic's highest court of appeal the Corte Suprema di Cassazione, Ercole Tanturri, expressed the idea of heritable sovereignty as "a perpetual quality, indelibly linked and united in the centuries to all the offspring of one who first achieved or claimed and is realized in the person of the Head of Name and Arms of Dynasty. . ." This thinking is reflected in the February 2011 statement of legitimacy for the Order of St. Lazarus, which avers that "the temporal protection of the order guaranteed by H.R.H. the Count of Paris, Duc de France, Head of the Royal House of France, as its fons honorum assures the traditional and historical legitimacy of the order, with the added grace of ensuring that the order is not in the patrimony of the Royal House of France." Thus, even the Orleanist order of St. Lazarus disavows that it is a dynastic foundation, but rather a historic canonical and French royal institution that is protected by the fons of the current claimant to the defunct French throne. This debate aside, the influential genealogist Louis Mendola concedes that Henri's royal patronage should certainly protect the Orleanist group from being lumped together with obviously "self-styled" groups and is at least, if not more, a "quasi-chivalric confraternity dedicated to charitable work." Still others argue that the Count of Paris can simply do what he wants as a fountain of honor, including create a new order or revive an old one. This notion is captured in the idea that the Orléans obedience, as protected by the Count of Paris, is a "legitimate and valid chivalric order since the Royal House of France is indeed a fount of honor. One can even argue that it would be a sort of revival of the ancient Order that was merged with the Order of Mount Carmel by the French Crown in the 17th century".

On 19 December 2016, Count Jan Dobrzenský, the 50th grand master, was knighted by Pope Francis as a Commander of the Pontifical Equestrian Order of St. Gregory the Great. Also elevated into the Order of Saint Sylvester Pope and Martyr was the order's Herald for the Grand Priory of Bohemia, Chev. Zdirad Jan Krtitel Cech, who entered as a knight.

In March 2023, Count Jan Dobrzenský resigned as 50th grand master to become grand master emeritus. He was succeeded by Prince François d'Orléans, Count of Dreux, who was installed as the 51st grand master in September 2023 in Belgium.

==== 2008: Malta-Paris obedience ====
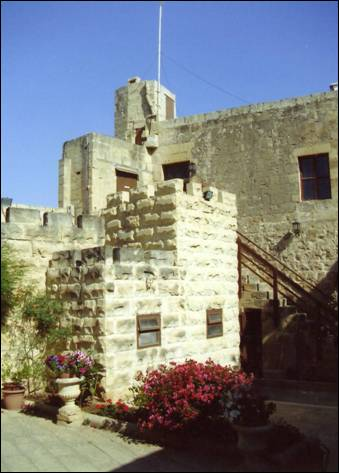
Castello Lanzun, a property of the Malta-Paris obedience in Malta.

In 2008, the previously separate Malta and Paris obediences formally reunited into the Malta-Paris obedience under the headship of Carlos Gereda y de Borbón and the Spiritual Protectorship of Gregory III Laham, the Melchite Greek Catholic Patriarch of Antioch at that time.

On 27 May 2012, Gregory III Laham signed the aforementioned declaration in Kevelaer, Germany, confirming the continuity of the order (under the united Malta-Paris obedience) under the Patriarchs of Antioch since his predecessor Patriarch Maximos III Mazloum had accepted the role of Spiritual Protector of the order in 1841.

In 2018, Francisco de Borbón von Hardenberg was elected as grand master of the Order of Saint Lazarus (Malta-Paris obedience). He is the only son of Francisco de Borbón y Escasany, 5th Duke of Seville, grand master emeritus.

==== 2010: Jerusalem obedience ====
In 2010, there was a further split within the Orléans obedience, requiring the Count of Paris to clarify that his temporal protection would remain with the obedience under Count Jan Dobrzenský z Dobrzenicz (Orléanist) as opposed to those who had broken away to form their own group under the leadership of Count Philippe Piccapietra who had previously been a member of the team led by Prince Charles Philippe, Duke of Anjou.

Piccapietra went on to establish Saint Lazare International in 2012 with its headquarters in Jerusalem. This 'Jerusalem obedience' now has as its Grand Master Prince Sixtus Henry of Bourbon-Parma and enjoys the spiritual patronage of Anglican Bishop Richard Garrard, emeritus Representative of the Archbishop of Canterbury to the Holy See.

== Organisation ==
=== Purpose ===
The purpose of the order is to "care and assistance of the sick and the poor, and to the support and defense of the Christian faith and the traditions and principles of Christian chivalry."

=== Charity ===
In recent years the order participate in worldwide humanitarian efforts. It has been engaged in a major charitable program to revive Christianity in Eastern Europe: Russia, Ukraine, Armenia, Georgia, and the Near East: Lebanon, Syria, and the Palestinian territories. Millions of dollars' worth of food, clothing, medical equipment and supplies have been distributed by the LHW-volunteers of the Humanitarian Grand Priory Europe (GPEU) in Poland, Hungary, Lithuania, Romania, Croatia and North Macedonia. Because of this experience, the European Community commissioned the LHW-volunteer organisation Lazarus-Hilfswerk to transport more than 21,000 tons of food to the hungry in Russia and to distribute it in St. Petersburg, Novorod and Moscow. The order organised with the LHW food aid and managed reconstruction projects after the 2004 Indian Ocean earthquake and tsunami.

- In New Zealand, the order supplied funds to "Victim Support" of Wellington to assist people to contending with the after-effects of earthquakes and floods.
- The Commandery in Lochore, Scotland, established a volunteer ambulance corps.
- The order in Malta funded the purchase by the "Emergency Fire and Rescue Unit" of a specialized stretcher purposely designed for particular rescue operations besides funding a number of philanthropic projects including support to organisations working with victims of Hansen's Disease.
- The order in Spain held a gala dinner to raise funds to benefit Cáritas, the Little Sisters of the Poor of Ronda, province of Málaga, and the Foundation Fontilles among other institutions.
- The order in Canada funds medical research, especially in leprosy, provides financial assistance to theology students by way of Saint Lazarus bursaries, and supports leprosy hospices.

The various jurisdictions still undertake to support the modern fight against leprosy, also known as Hansen's disease (HD).

== Insignia and vestments ==
For the Order of Saint Lazarus ceremonial occasions, such as investitures, the members wear distinctive vestments and insignia. The mantle of the order is a black cloak with a green velvet collar and the cross of the order sewn onto the left side. The mantle is always worn at religious ceremonies. In addition to the mantle and insignia members of the order normally wear white gloves and ladies may also wear a mantilla in church.

The insignia of a knight is a badge with military trophy pendant from a green neck ribbon, and a golden breast star. Dames of the order wear the badge with wreath of laurel and oak springs from a ribbon bow and a golden breast star. A green button hole rosette may also be worn on a business suit by gentlemen of the order.

=== Gallery ===
Coat of arms of the order.

Flag of the order.

Cross of the order, a green Maltese cross, also included in the flag of the Volunteers Corps.

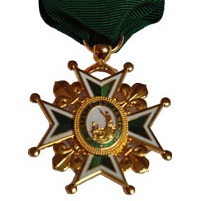
Insignia of the order.

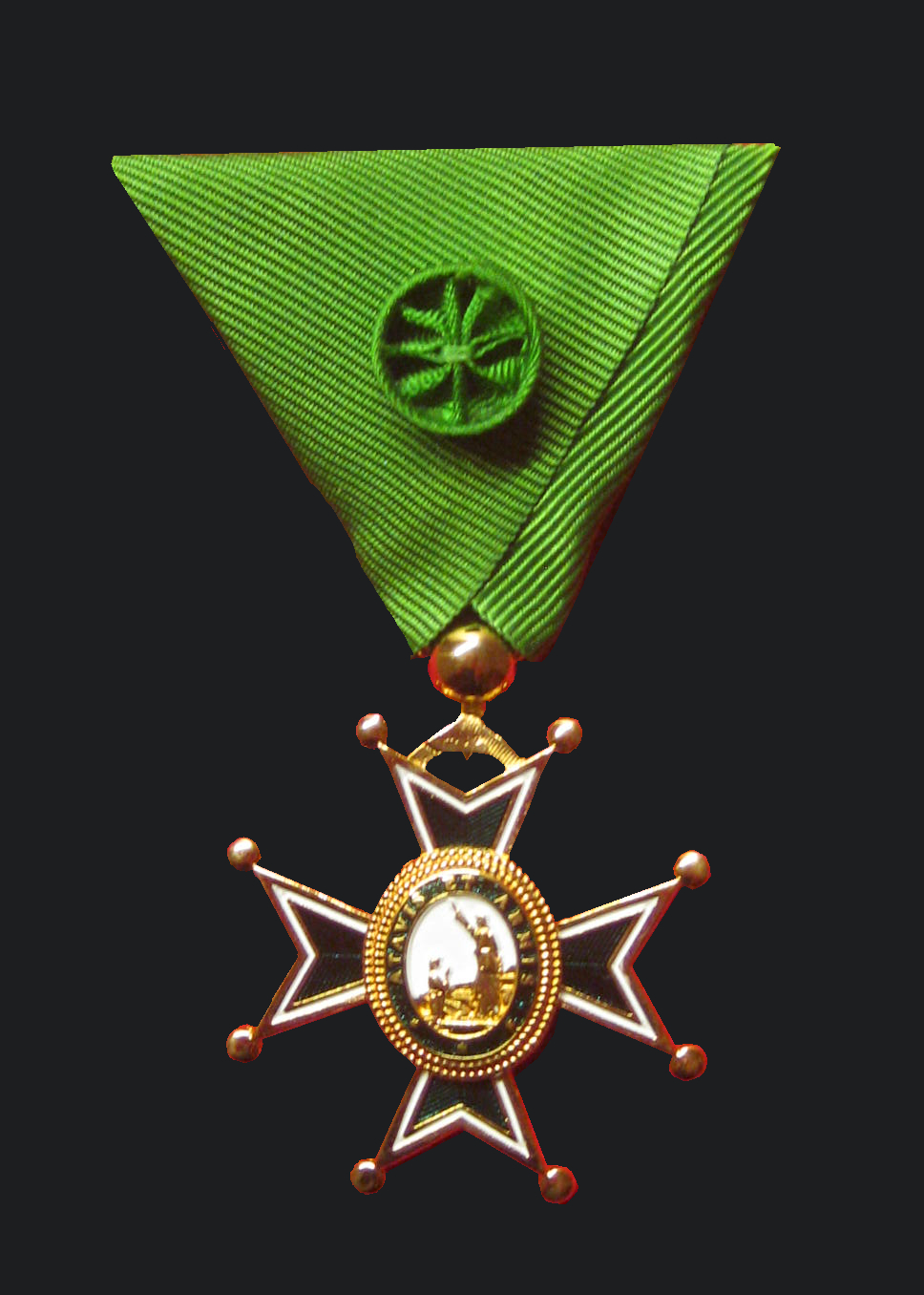
Officer of the order.

== Membership ==
Membership in the Order of Saint Lazarus is by invitation only and is an honour granted by the Grand Magistry of the order. Those belonging to the order include members of the European nobility, academics, politicians and senior clergy. Membership in the order is divided into two classes, knights of justice and knights of magistral grace, the former restricted to members of families with noble titles. All members of the order are invested in one of the following ranks, regardless of whether they are in the class of justice or magistral grace.

Lay Rank (Orléans)	Clergy Rank (Orléans)	Lay Rank (Malta-Paris)	Clergy Rank (Malta-Paris)
Knight/Dame Grand Cross; GCLJ	Prelate Grand Cross; GCLJ	Knight/Dame Grand Cross; GCLJ	Ecclesiastical Grand Cross; EGCLJ
Knight/Dame Commander; KCLJ / DCLJ	Ecclesiastical Commander; ECLJ	Knight/Dame Commander; KCLJ / DCLJ	Ecclesiastical Commander; ECLJ
Knight/Dame; KLJ / DLJ	Senior Chaplain; SChLJ	Knight/Dame; KLJ / DLJ	Senior Chaplain; SChLJ
–	–	Commander; CLJ	Chaplain; ChLJ
Serving Brother/Sister; SBLJ / SSLJ	Chaplain; ChLJ	Officer; OLJ	Assistant Chaplain; AChLJ
Brother / Sister; BLJ / SLJ	–	Member; MLJ	-

Men who are invested in the rank of knight (KLJ) or higher are entitled to the prenominal Chevalier. Women invested in the rank of Dame or higher are entitled to the prenominal Dame.

In the Orléans obedience, full membership is restricted to those aged 25 or above, although a noviciate membership level is open to those aged 18 or above.

In addition, there is a Companionate of Merit, which can be awarded to members of the order. It is also used to honour individuals who are not members of the order but have supported its work or made a significant contribution to society. Those admitted may receive the grade of Member of Merit, Officer of Merit, Commander of Merit, Knight/Dame of Merit, or Knight/Dame Grand Cross of Merit.

== Prominent members ==
=== Orléans obedience ===
Martin Thacker, the feudal Baron of Fetternear, is the Grand Prior of the Orléans obedience in Great Britain. In Portugal, the Grand Prior is Francisco Fonseca da Silva, Marquis et Comte d'Ervededo. The Grand Prior for Lusophone Africa is Abel de Lacerda Botelho, Comte de Ribadouro. In Poland, the Grand Prior is Krzysztof Polasik-Lipiński, and Spiritual Prior is Bishop Krzysztof Stefan Włodarczyk (Bishop of Bydgoszcz). President of the Governing Council of the Order is Prince Charles-Philippe d'Orléans, Duke of Anjou. Spiritual Protector and Chaplain General of the Orléans obedience of the Military and Hospitaller Order of Saint Lazarus of Jerusalem is Cardinal Antoine Kambanda (Archbishop of Kigali)

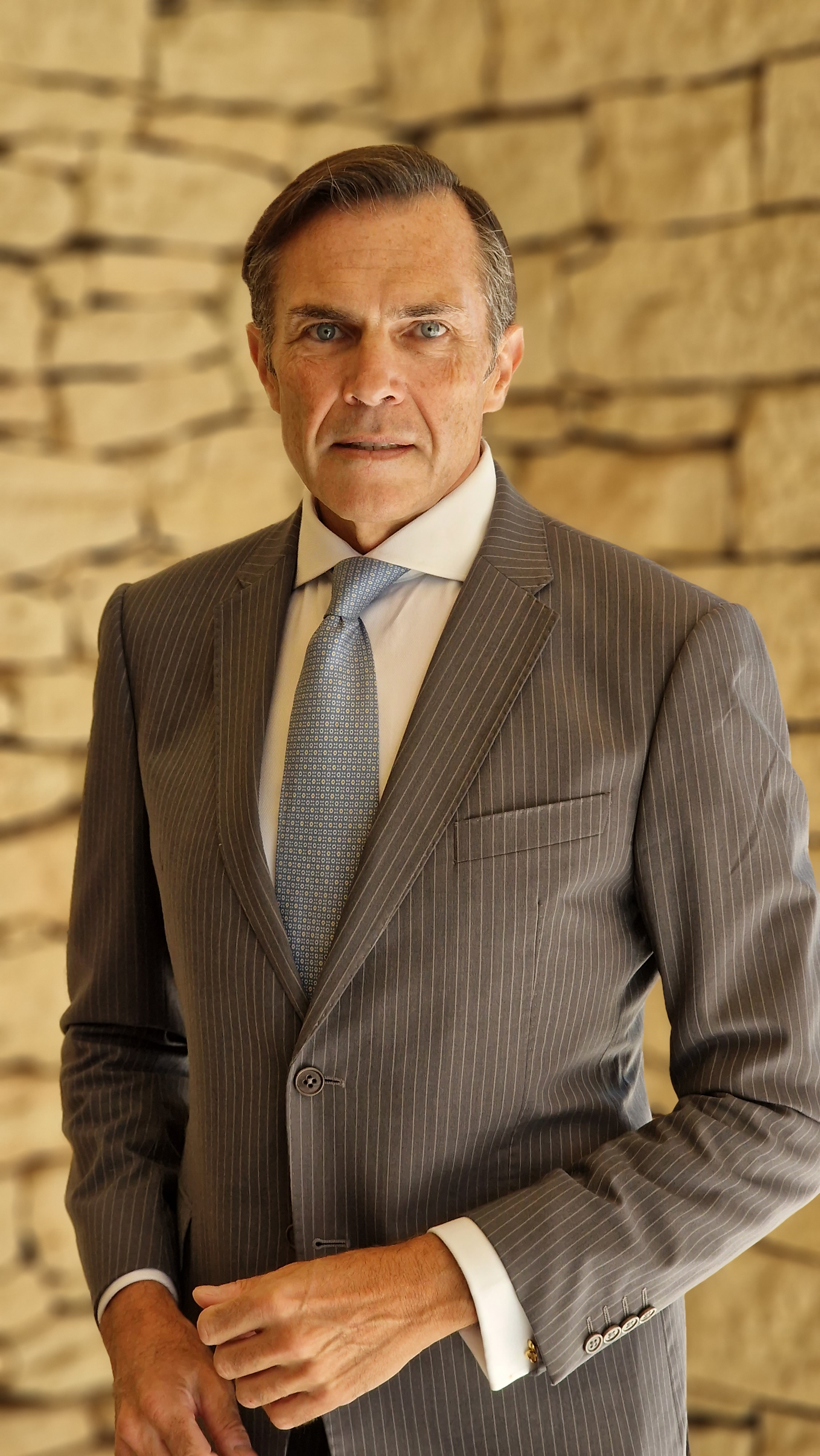
Prince Charles Philippe Marie Louis d'Orléans, Duke of Anjou, 49th Grand Master of the Orléans obedience from 2004 to 2010.

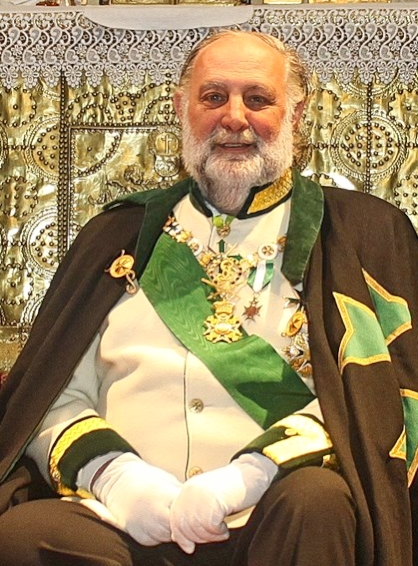
Count Jan Nepomuk Josef IV. Dobrzenský, 50th Grand Master of the Orléans obedience from 2010 to 2023.

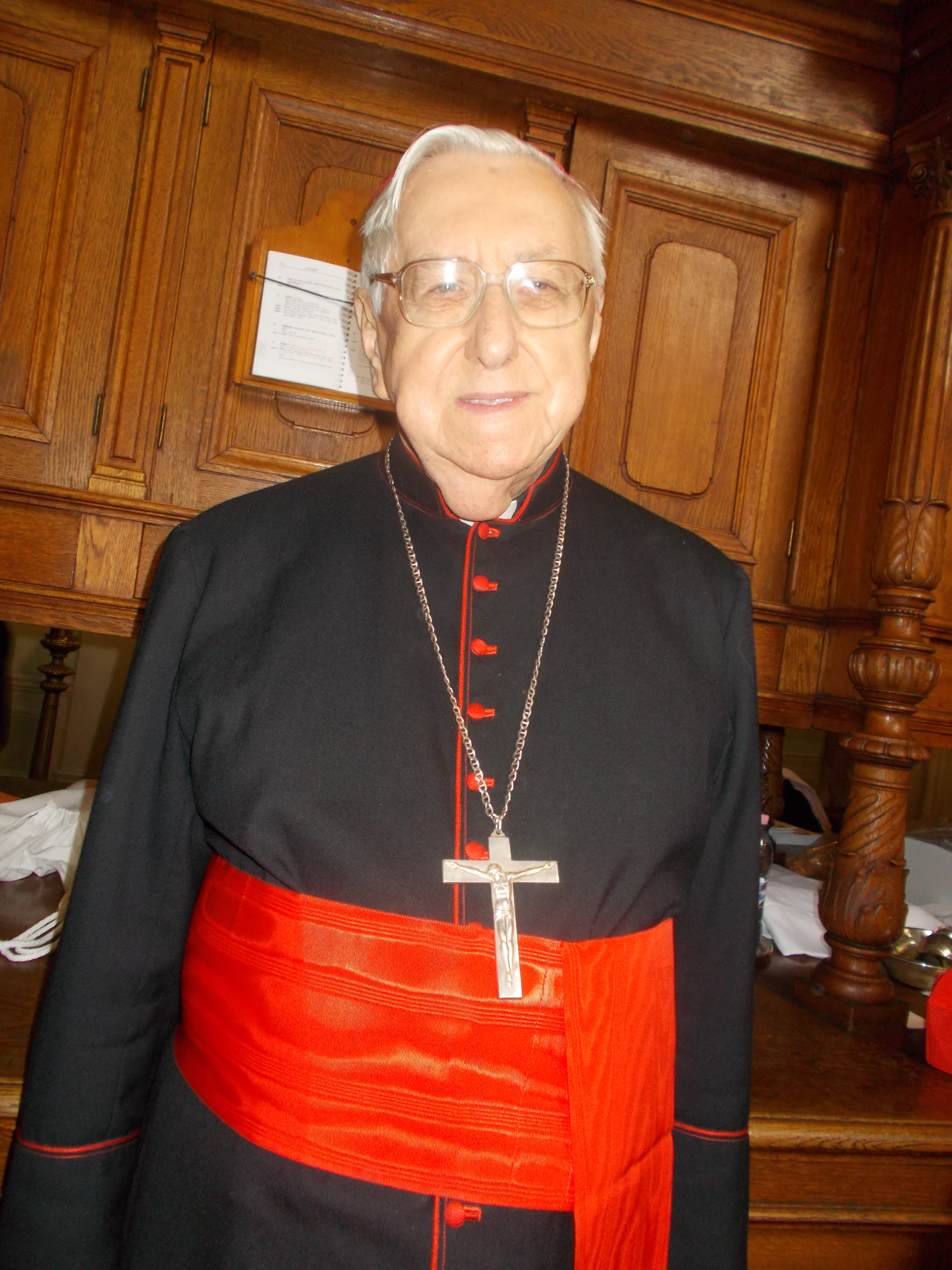
Cardinal László Paskai, First Spiritual Protector and Chaplain General of the Orléans obedience from 2004 to 2012.

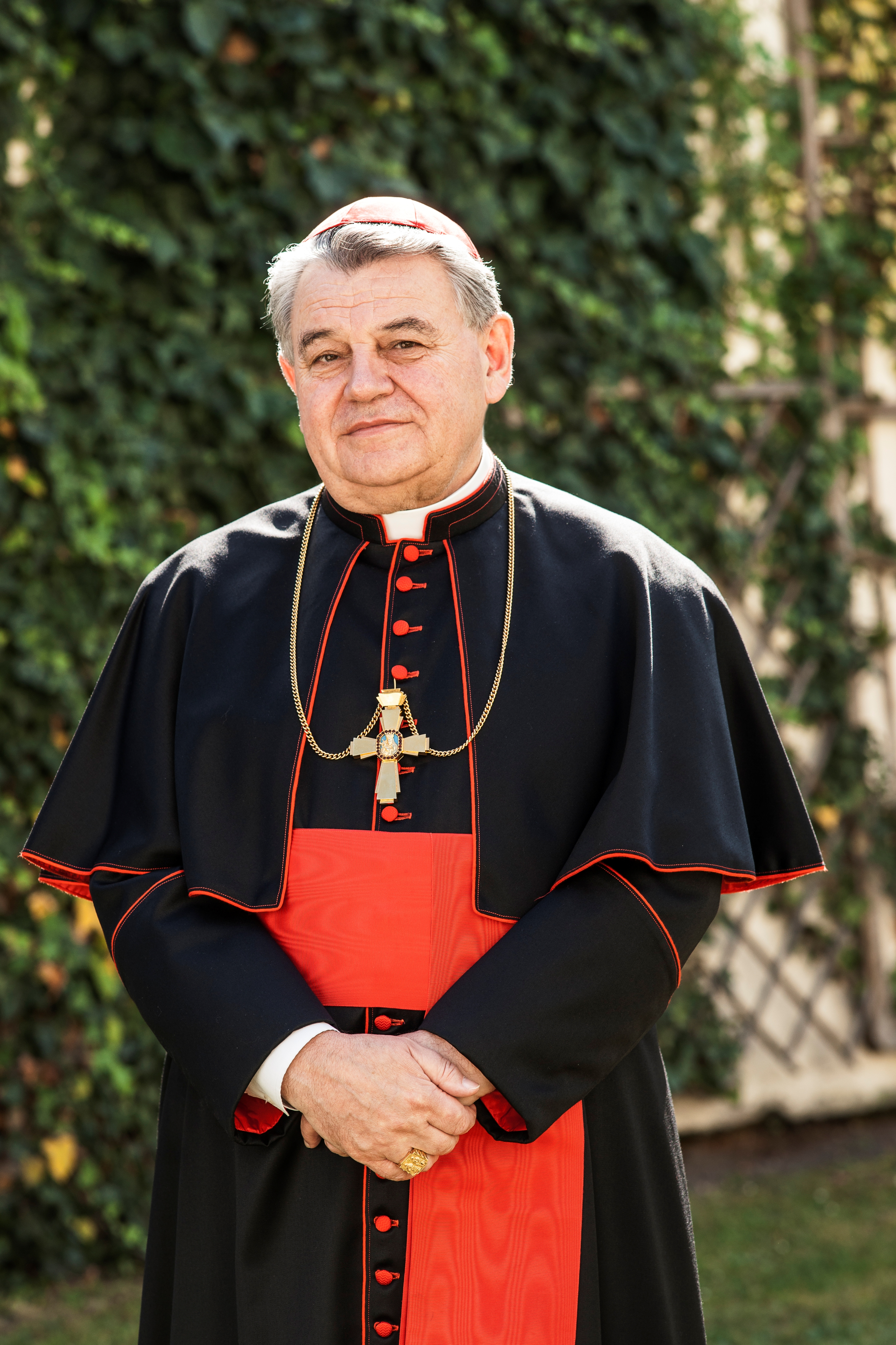
Cardinal Dominik Duka, Spiritual Protector of the Orléans obedience from 2012 to 2021.

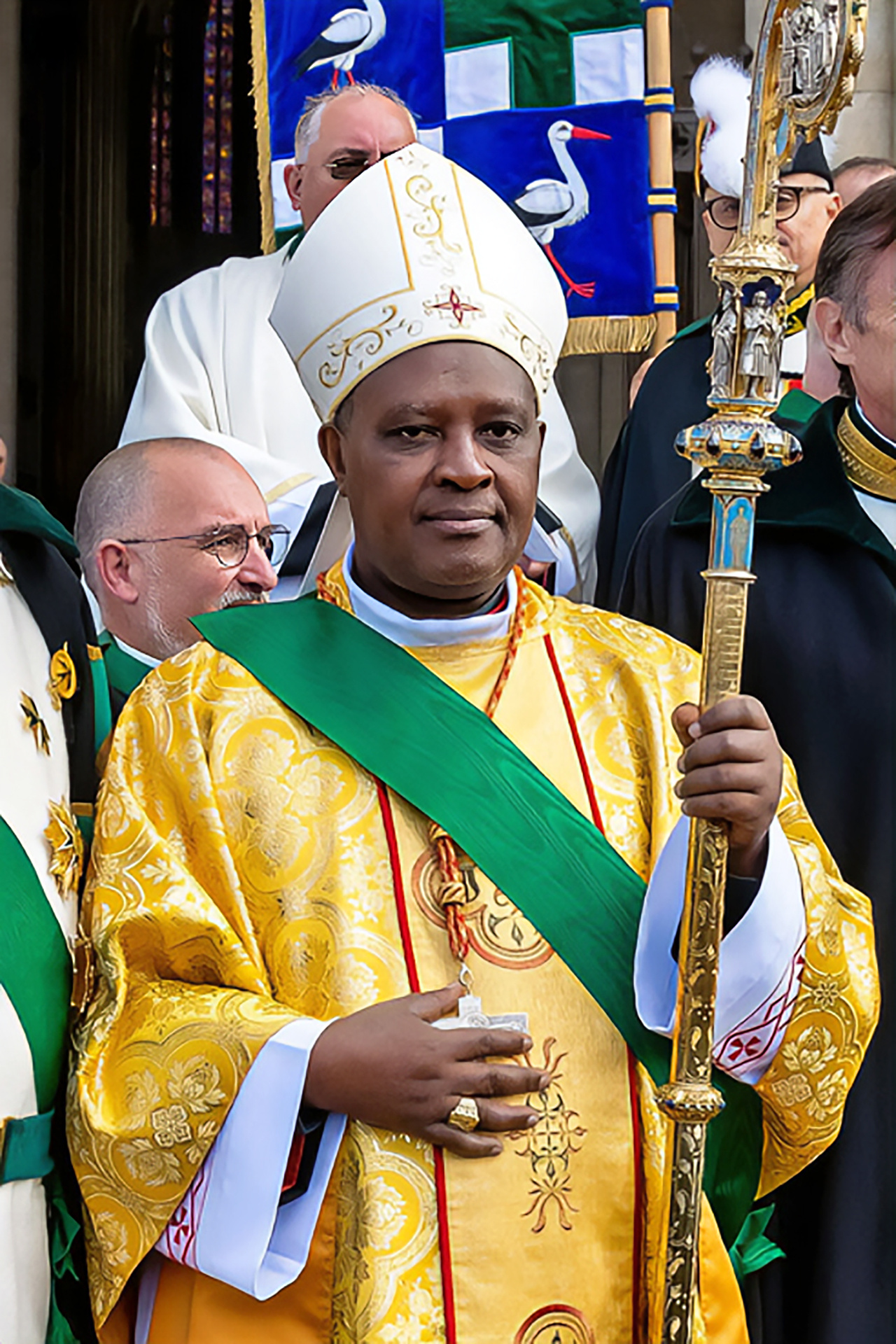
Cardinal Antoine Kambanda, Spiritual Protector and Chaplain General of the Orléans obedience from 2022.

=== Malta-Paris obedience ===
A number of royal houses are represented among the knights of the order, including Prince David Bagration of Mukhrani of Georgia, and Zera Yacob Amha Selassie, Crown Prince of Ethiopia. Also, the Patriarch Abune Paulos of the Ethiopian Orthodox Tewahedo Church.

In the United Kingdom, the order has counted several hereditary peers among its membership. The 13th Earl Ferrers was the grand prior of England and Wales (Malta obedience) until he was succeeded in March 2012 by the 22nd Earl of Shrewsbury, who was followed by the late 13th Marquess of Lothian 2013–2024. The current Bailiff is Cardiff optician, David A. Woolf. In Scotland, the late 5th Viscount Gough served as head of the grand bailiwick of Scotland.

In Ireland, Denis O'Conor Don, Chief of the Name O'Conor and principal claimant to the High Kingship of Ireland, was a knight of justice in the order as well as Juge d'Armes of the Grand Priory of Ireland. Other noble families are also represented among the order's membership in Ireland, including O'Morchoe, Bunbury and Guinness.

The grand priory of Australia was under the patronage of the former Governor-General of Australia, Quentin Bryce, during her tenure from 2008 to 2014. In New Zealand, Dr Richard Davies, husband of Governor General Dame Cindy Kiro, is the Vice-Regal Patron of the order, and the Māori King Tuheitia Paki was a knight commander of the order.

== Other Lazarite organisations ==
=== Order of Saint Lazarus of Jerusalem (1995) ===
Founded by John Baron von Hoff (1937–2016), its website states that a "Grand Priory of England, Wales, Isle of Man and Channel Islands", of which Niels Ole Larsen is now the grand master, was established in 1995, and that a wider body of "United Grand Priories" was set up in 1999. It chose to be independent of the same "United Grand Priories" due to the fact that John Baron von Hoff assumed for himself the title of master general of the order without the backing and approval of the other Grand Priories within the "United Grand Priories". The other Grand Priories continued expanding as the Hospitaller Order of Saint Lazarus (see below). The organization claims it is not an order of chivalry and that it has no pretensions of being an order of chivalry directly descended from the original Order of Saint Lazarus, or from the order statuted in 1910.

=== United Grand Priories (1995) ===
This body's website states that an organisation called the "United Grand Priories of the Hospitaller Order of Saint Lazarus of Jerusalem" was established in 1995. It is registered as a chivalric organisation within the United Nations and has a presence in many countries of the world, with a membership of 14,000 Lazarites. It is based in Edinburgh, Scotland, with an administrative presence in Malta, and it was under the leadership of Richard Comyns of Ludston (as Supreme Grand Prior) and the spiritual direction of Mgr Joseph Vella Gauci (as Grand Chaplain General) until the former's demise in 2020. The organisation claims to be chivalric, but it makes no claim to be an order of chivalry descended directly from the original Order of Saint Lazarus, or from the order statuted in 1910.

In 2020, on the 25th anniversary since the founding of the United Grand Priories, Sandor Habsburg-Lothringen (elder son of Dominic von Habsburg) was appointed as Supreme Grand Prior of the organisation, together with a number of Grand Officers from various jurisdictions projecting the organisation's international presence.

It is very active within international and European fora and is a member of various United Nations initiatives, Amnesty International, the European Disability Forum, the European Network of Independent Living, Inclusion International and other institutions. Several distinguished personalities, including heads of state, nobility, high-ranking government ministers and public personalities, are members of this chivalric organisation.

The ranks of membership within this organisation are similar to other Lazarite chivalric organisations, starting from member of the order (MLJ), with the highest rank within the order being that of Knight Grand Cross (GCLJ) or Dame Grand Cross of the order. The organisation also has a prestigious Companionate of Merit for persons from all over the world who have aided and assisted the order or who have performed meritorious philanthropic or social work in their career. Whilst membership of the order is exclusively for Christians of all denominations, the Companionate of Merit is conferred regardless of religious affiliation. During investitures, members of the order wear black mantles with a green eight-pointed cross.

Efforts to create a memorandum of understanding and cooperation agreements between the Hospitaller Order of Saint Lazarus and the various obediences within the Military and Hospitaller Order of Saint Lazarus were regularly brought up, especially during the years 2003–2004, but were never concluded in full.

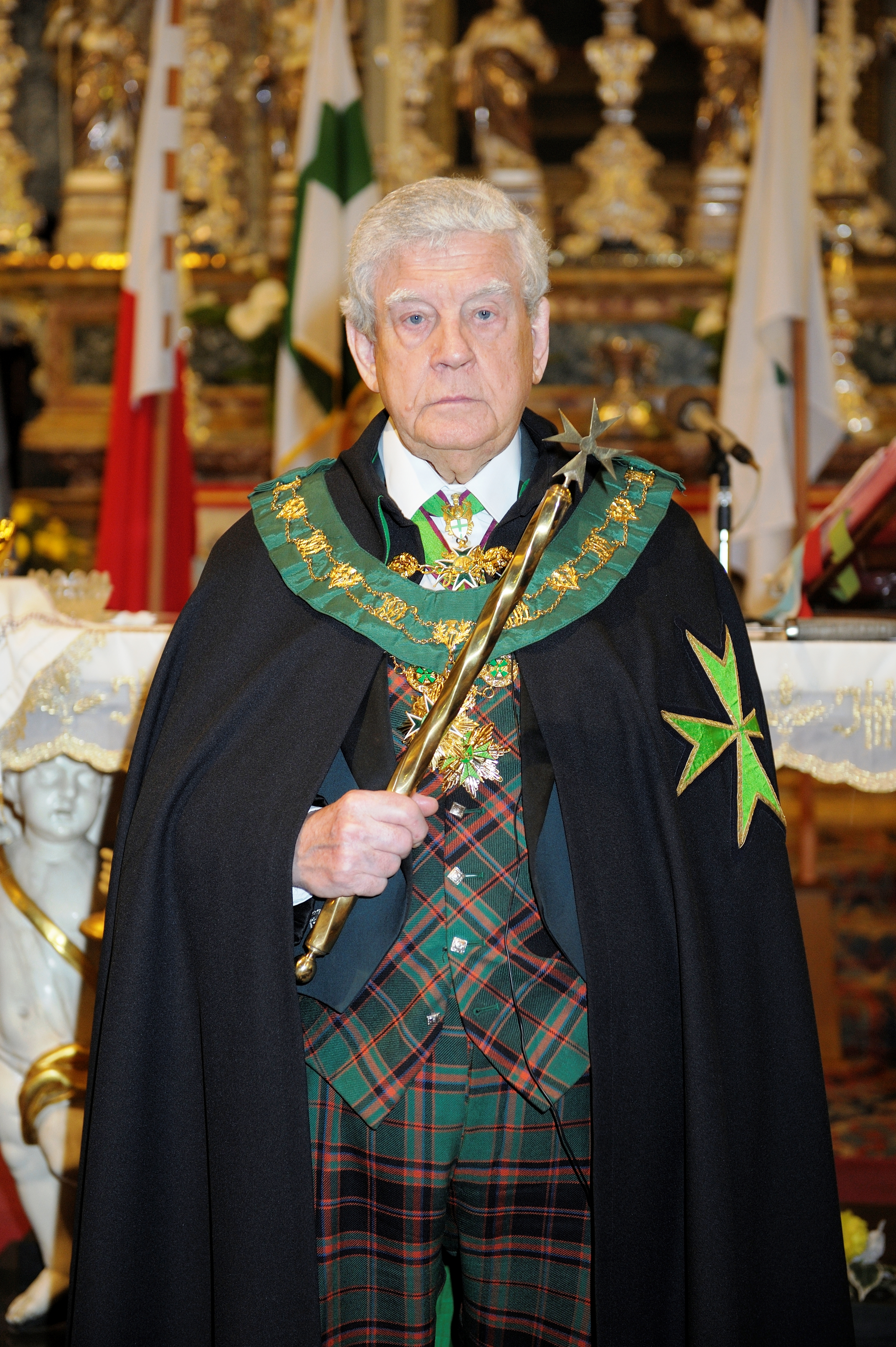
Richard Comyns of Ludston (1933–2020), the first Supreme Grand Prior, in 2013

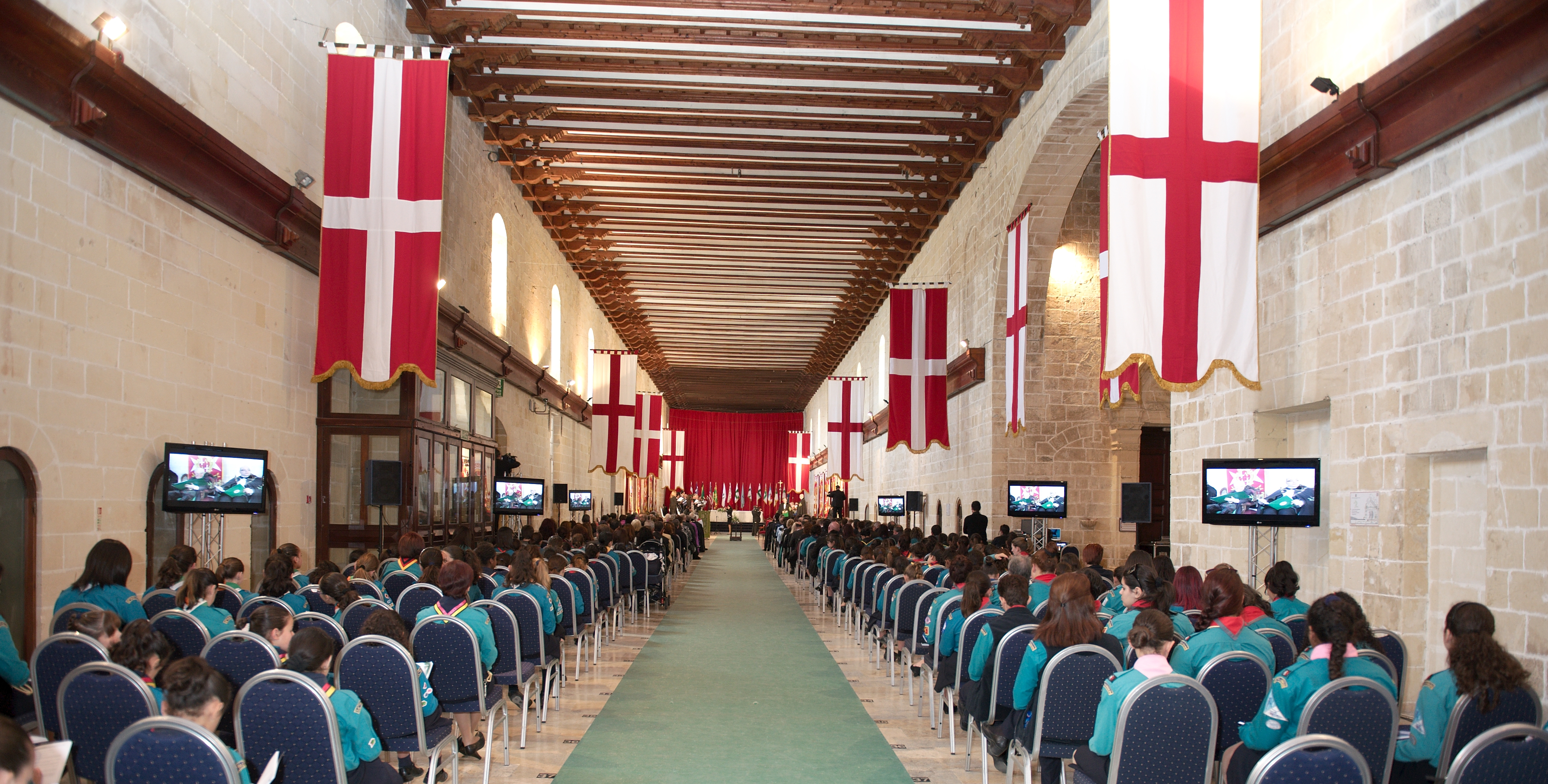
The first International Lazarite Symposium, held in 2012 at the Sacra Infermeria in Valletta, Malta

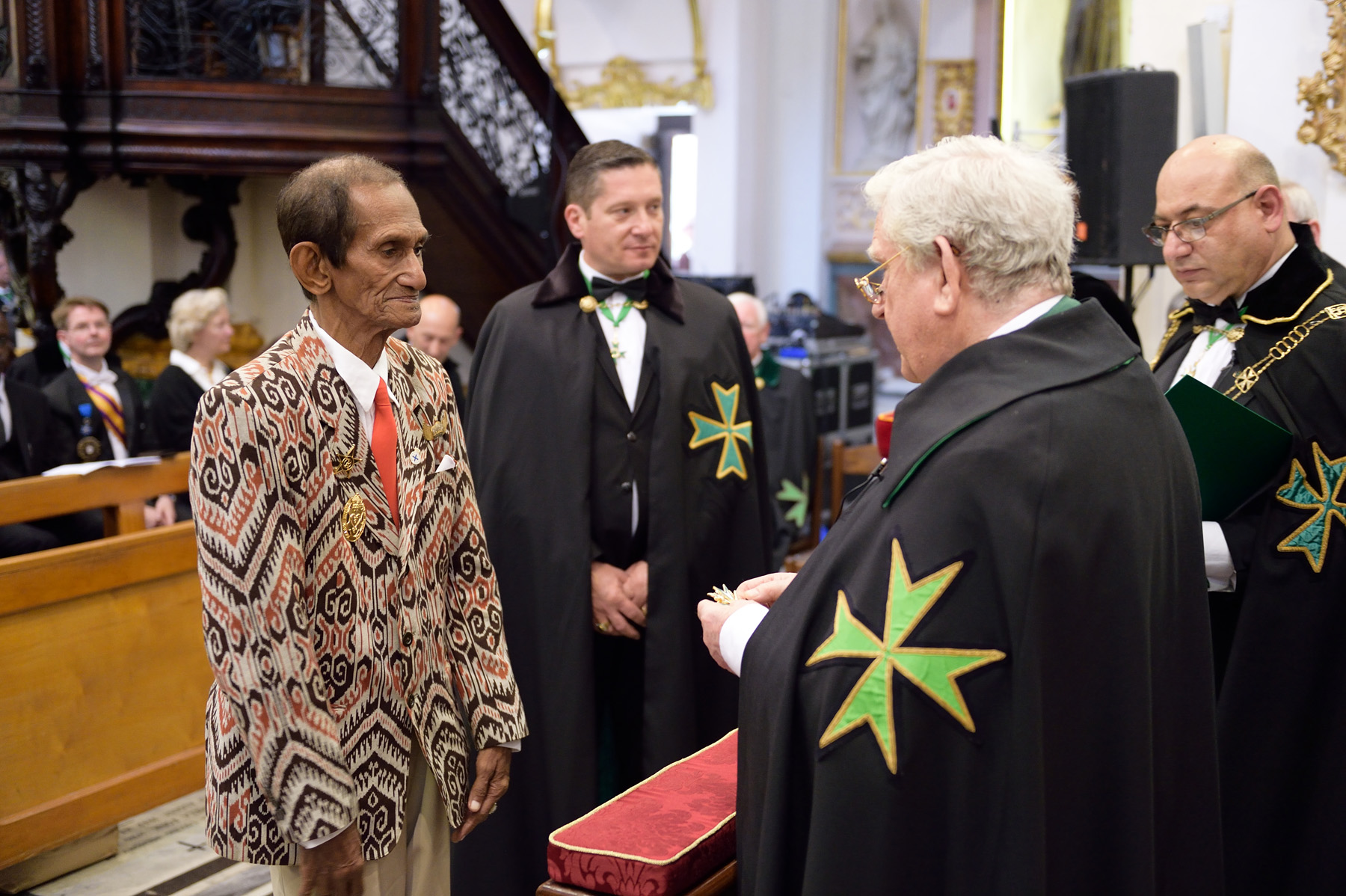
Installation of the Rajah of Kupang as Grand Prior of Indonesia, in 2016

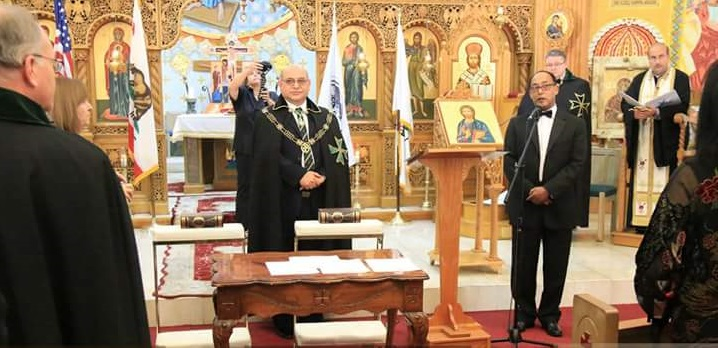
The Grand Chancellor, Massimo Ellul, with the Grand Prior of Ethiopia, HIH Prince Ermias Sahle Selassie, in 2016

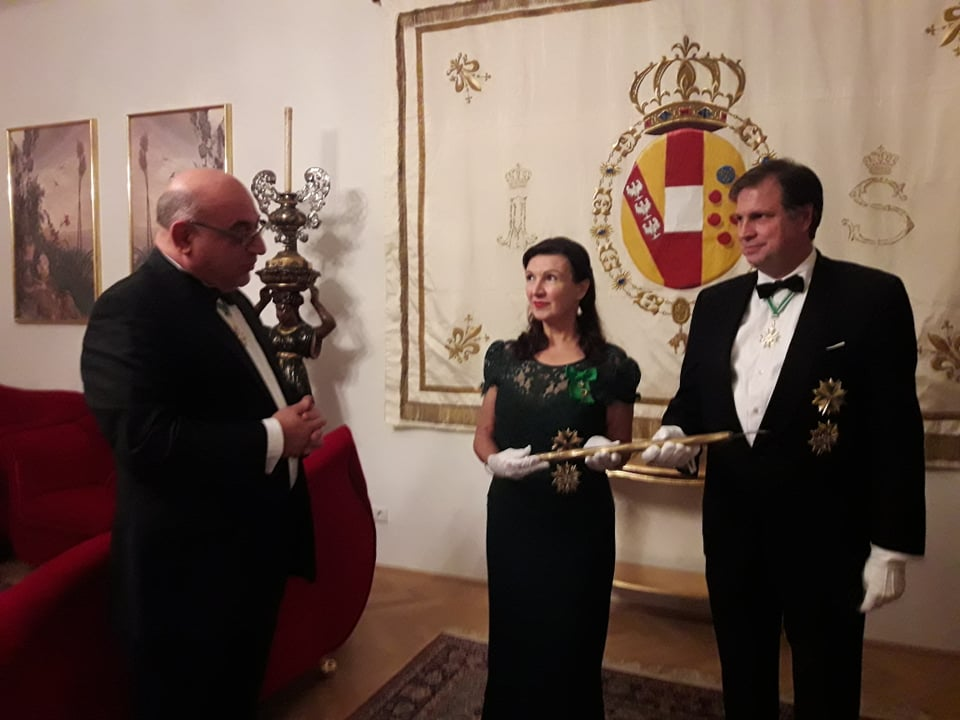
The current Supreme Grand Prior, Sandor Habsburg-Lothringen, during a Supreme Grand Priory meeting in 2020 at Schönbrunn Palace

=== Grand Priory of Carpathia (2008) ===
The Grand Priory of Carpathia is an alliance of jurisdictions of the Order of Saint Lazarus of Jerusalem that are located within the Carpathian Basin, or adjacent to it, or historically were part of the Kingdom of Hungary or the Austro-Hungarian Empire.

The Grand Prior is Colonel Andrew von Rhedey.

In 2004, the leaders broke from the then-recognized obediences. Efforts to achieve a reconciliation failed in 2008 when the constitution of the newly united Malta-Paris obedience was not accepted. From that time onward, the Grand Priory of Carpathia has functioned autonomously.

== See also ==
- Grand Master of the Order of Saint Lazarus (statuted 1910)
- Lazarus Hilfswerk (founded in 1973)
- Lazarus Union (founded in 2006)
- Order of Saint Lazarus (founded in 12th century)
- Order of Saints Maurice and Lazarus (founded in 1572)
- Royal Military and Hospitaller Order of Our Lady of Mount Carmel and Saint Lazarus of Jerusalem united (founded in 1608)
