= Carlos Gereda y de Borbón =

Spanish aristocrat, engineering entrepreneur and philanthropist

The Most Illustrious Carlos Gereda y de Borbón
- Marqués de Almazán (jure uxoris)
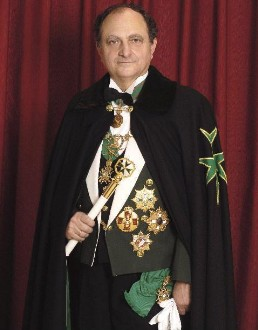

49th Grand Master of the Order of Saint Lazarus (Malta-Paris obedience)
- Tenure: 12 October 2008 – 29 August 2017 (his death)
- Predecessor: The 5th Duke of Seville (Malta); The 13th Duke of Brissac (Paris)
- Successor: Francisco de Borbón y Hardenberg
- Born: 24 January 1947; Montevideo, Uruguay
- Died: 29 August 2017 (aged 70); Madrid, Spain
- Family: Bourbon-Anjou (enatic)
- Spouses: María de las Nieves Castellano y Barón, 15th Marquesa de Almazán
- Father: Nicolás Gereda y Bustamante
- Mother: María Luisa de Borbón y Pintó

Don Carlos Gereda y de Borbón, Marqués de Almazán (24 January 1947 – 29 August 2017) was a Spanish aristocrat, engineering entrepreneur and philanthropist.

He was the youngest son of Don Nicolás Gereda y Bustamante and his wife, Doña María Luisa de Borbón y Pintó. She was the younger child of Alberto María de Borbón y d'Ast, 2nd Duke of Santa Elena and Grandee of Spain, a male-line descendant of King Charles IV of Spain through Infante Enrique, 1st Duke of Seville (who married morganatically).

From 2008 until his death in 2017, he served as 49th Grand Master of the Order of Saint Lazarus (Malta-Paris obedience), as such succeeding the 5th Duke of Seville (Malta obedience) and the 13th Duke of Brissac (Paris obedience).

== Early life ==
He was born in Uruguay, where his parents moved after the Spanish Civil War to run the country estate they had inherited. Through his maternal grandfather, the 2nd Duke of Santa Elena, he is related to the Spanish branch of the House of Bourbon, being a sixth cousin once removed of King Felipe VI.

He spent his early childhood in Spain, before being sent to Ladycross Preparatory School in Sussex, England. He then attended Downside School, a Benedictine foundation in Somerset, before reading Industrial Engineering at the Complutense University of Madrid.

On 15 February 1975, he married Doña María de las Nieves Castellano y Barón, 15th Marquesa de Almazán (born 24 September 1947). Her family's hereditary title was created in 1575 by Philip II of Spain.

== Career ==
In 1975, he embarked on a career in business as a commercial development entrepreneur, which provided him opportunities to travel the world from the Far East to South America and Central Europe. He and his wife lived in Buenos Aires from 1979 to 1986, from where she still operates an oil services company.

He was involved in establishing a Museum of Science and Leisure at Málaga, Spain, with the aim of its developing into one of the most important such museums in southern Europe.

== Death ==
On 29 August 2017, he died at his residence in Madrid, Spain, following a short illness. He was buried on 30 August in a private family ceremony.

== Distinctions ==
- 49th Grand Master of the Order of Saint Lazarus (Malta-Paris obedience); invested at the Chapter-General in 2008; elected after swearing the solemn oath in the presence of knights and dames of the order at Manchester Cathedral, United Kingdom.
