= Order of Our Lady of Mount Carmel =

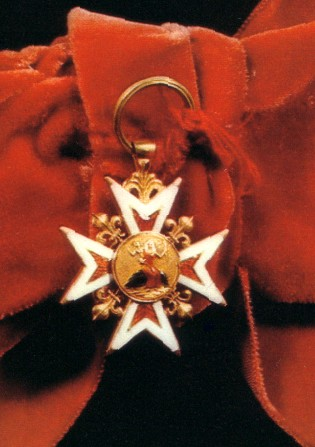
Insignia of the order

The Order of Our Lady of Mount Carmel was founded in 1608 by Pope Paul V at the request of King Henry IV of France.

== History ==
According to the official version recorded in the bull of Pope Paul V setting up the Order of Our Lady of Mount Carmel, King Henry IV felt moved to protect, propagate and increase the Catholic religion by applying remedies in France "in order to exalt and increase the Holy Roman Church, extinguish heresies, suppress heretics, and other things". It seems that Henri IV commissioned the noble Charles de Neufville as his royal delegate to obtain from the Holy See permission to found a militia or military order instituted under the consent and authority of the Holy See "and at the will of King Henry himself, appropriately from his merely lay resources (but not the income of the benefices or church)". The new order, composed of French noblemen and freeborn men, would be "under the denomination or title and rule of the most glorious and always Virginal Mother Mary of Mount Carmel, whom the said King Henry always holds and regards with singular devotion as his protectress and advocate".

The Order of Our Lady of Mount Carmel was formally created by Pope Paul V through the Bull Romanus Pontificus dated 16 February 1608, expanded through Militantium ordinum dated 26 February 1608. The bulls gave the French king the authority to nominate the Grand Master of this order subject to papal confirmation. The king appointed the former Grand Master of the Order of Saint Lazarus, Philibert de Nérestang, to the post of Grand Master of the new order, an appointment that received papal approval. The Grand Master received 1800 ducats and a knight 500 ducats annually.

In 1572, the house of the Order of Saint Lazarus in Italy was merged with the Savoyan Order of St. Maurice to become the Order of Sts. Maurice and Lazarus. According to Michael Foster, "the Pope determined not to allow, two Orders of Lazarus to continue, founded by Papal Bull the Order of our Lady of Mount Carmel, which was to absorb the French Order of St. Lazarus."

On 31 October 1608, Henri IV amalgamated administratively the newly created Order of Our Lady of Mount Carmel with the Order of St. Lazarus to form the Ordres Royaux, Militaires & Hospitaliers de Saint Lazare de Jérusalem & de Notre-Dame du Mont-Carmel réunis (Royal Military and Hospitaller Order of Our Lady of Mount Carmel and Saint Lazarus of Jerusalem united).

The King wished that the new commanderies contribute something to the maintenance of hospitals for the army and in the frontier towns. The order acquired the possessions of the Order of the Holy Ghost of Montpellier, of Order of Saint Jacob with the Sword, Order of the Holy Sepulchre, of St. Christina of Somport, and of St. Louis of Boucheraumont, which were all deemed extinct and abolished.

This amalgamation eventually received canonical acceptance on 5 June 1668 by a bull issued by Cardinal Legate de Vendôme under papal authority of Clement IX and eventually by papal bull of Pope Innocent XII dated 3 May 1695 who further confirmed the newly appointed Grand Master Philippe de Courcillon Marquis de D’Angeau as Grand Master of the united Orders. Right through the 17–18th centuries, while enjoying the protection of the French Crown, the order remained under apostolic authority. The Order of Our Lady of Mount Carmel had its own insignia and uniform. It was composed of knights, chaplains or spiritual knights, brothers and novices.

The 18th century was to see the order gaining increasing patronage from the French royal house with the appointment of Louis de Berry, future King Louis XVI, as the orders’ Grand Master in 1757, and the 1778–79 reorganizational reforms where the junior Order of Our Lady of Mount Carmel was formally and administratively linked to the École Militaire Royale located on the Champs de Mars in Paris. The latter reform allowed the school's graduates to have the opportunity to becoming members of the Order of Our Lady of Mount Carmel alone. The École Militaire was closed down by royal decree in October 1787, and no further admissions to the junior order were subsequent made after 1788. A decision was apparently taken to allow the Order of Our Lady of Mount Carmel to become extinct which on the basis of canon law would occur a hundred years after the death of the last admitted member of that order. The senior Order of Saint Lazarus of Jerusalem was allowed to function being authorized in September 1788 by King Louis XVI to purchase the edifice housing the École Militaire.

A small number of Hereditary Commanderships were created in the united order, but the order was abolished in 1791 during the Revolution. Although the monarchy was restored in 1814, by royal edict in 1824, the order was allowed to become extinct.

Ackermann mentions this chivalric order as an historical order of France.

== Sources ==
- Gustav Adolph Ackermann, " Ordensbuch, Sämtlicher in Europa blühender und erloschener Orden und Ehrenzeichen ". Annaberg, 1855, p 208, n° 82. "Vereinigter Orden Unserer lieben Frau vom Berg Karmel und des heil. Lazarus" – Google Books (Former orders of France : p. 205–214)
- Grouvel, Robert. L'Ordre de Notre-Dame du Mont-Carmel et l'École Royale Militaire (1779–1787). Carney de La Sabretache, 1967, p. 352–356
