= Capetian dynasty =

European royal house of Frankish origin

House of Capet
- One variation of the Capetian Armorial
- Parent house: Robertians, Carolingians (cognatic)
- Country: List: Kingdom of France (987–1792, 1814–1815, 1815–1848); Kingdom of Portugal (1139–1383; 1385–1580 and 1640–1853 through illegitimate branches); Latin Empire (1216–1261); Kingdom of Sicily/Naples/Two Sicilies (1266–1442, 1501–1504, 1700–1714, 1735–1861); Kingdom of Navarre (1284–1441, 1555–1562, 1572–1620); Kingdom of Hungary and Croatia (1308–1395); Kingdom of Poland (1370–1399, 1573–1575); Burgundian State (1384–1482); Grand Duchy of Lithuania (1573–1575); Kingdom of Sardinia (1700–1714); Kingdom/Empire of Brazil (1815–1889 through illegitimate branch); Kingdom of Spain (1700–1808, 1813–1868, 1874–1931, since 1975); Grand Duchy of Luxembourg (since 1964)
- Founded: 987; 1039 years ago
- Founder: Hugh Capet
- Current head: Louis Alphonse, Duke of Anjou
- Titles: List: Latin Emperor; Emperor of Brazil; King of France/King of the Franks; King of Spain; King of Castile; King of Aragon; King of Valencia; King of Mallorca; King of León; King of Sicily; King of Naples; King of Navarre; King of Hungary; King of Jerusalem (Note: Titular claim rather than de facto.); King of Albania; King of Bulgaria; King of Croatia; King of Dalmatia; King of Slavonia; King of Poland; King of Portugal; King of Galicia and Lodomeria; King of Jaén; King of Thessalonica; King of New Mexico; King of Peru; King of the Indies; King of the East and West Indies; King of Chile (Note: Title given to Philip II by his father, Charles V, prior to his marriage with Mary of England. This was to ensure that Philip would not be outranked by his wife.); Grand Duke of Luxembourg; Co-prince of Andorra; Chief minister of France; Prime Minister of France; Princes of Condé; Duke of Burgundy; Duke of Parma and Piacenza; Duke of Modena and Reggio; Duke of Milan; Duke of Lothier; Duke of Brabant; Duke of Limburg; Duke of Gelderland; Duke of Anjou; Duke of Alençon; Duke of Angoulême; Duke of Aquitaine; Duke of Berry; Duke of Bourbon; Duke of Brittany; Duke of Braganza; Duke of Calabria; Duke of Châtellerault; Duke of Durazzo; Duke of Enghien; Duke of Lucca; Duke of Montpensier; Duke of Nemours; Duke of Normandy; Duke of Orléans; Duke of Parma; Duke of Slavonia; Duke of Touraine; Duke of Vendôme; Margrave of Namur; Margrave of Moravia; Margrave of Antwerp; Marquis of Oristano; Marquis of Goceano; Count of Artois; Count of Flanders; Count of Charolais; Count of Barcelona; Count of Roussillon; Count of Cerdanya; Count of Anjou; Count of Champagne; Count of Chartres; Count of Clermont; Count of Dreux; Count of Étampes; Count of Eu; Count of Évreux; Count of Gravina; Count of La Marche; Count of Longueville; Count of Montpensier; Count of Mortain; Count of Nevers; Count of Perche; Count of Poitiers; Count of Provence; Count of Soissons; Count of Toulouse; Count of Valois; Count of Vendôme; Count of Vermandois; Count Palatine of Burgundy; Count of Vertus; Lord of Biscay; Lord of Mechelen; Lord of Molina
- Cadet branches: See below

The Capetian dynasty (/kəˈpiːʃən/ kə-PEE-shən; French: Capétiens /ka.pe.sjɛ̃/), also known as the House of France (French: La Maison de France), is a dynasty of Frankish origin, and a branch of the Robertians agnatically, and the Carolingians through female lines. It is among the largest and oldest royal houses in Europe and the world, and consists of Hugh Capet, the founder of the dynasty, and his male-line descendants, who ruled in France without interruption from 987 to 1792, and again from 1814 to 1848. The senior line from the House of Capet ruled in France from the election of Hugh Capet in 987 until the death of Charles IV in 1328. That line was succeeded by cadet branches, first the House of Valois, and succeeding them the House of Bourbon, which ruled until the French Revolution abolished the monarchy in 1792 and tried and executed King Louis XVI in 1793. The Bourbons were restored in 1814 in the aftermath of Napoleon's defeat, but had to vacate the throne again in 1830 in favor of the last Capetian monarch of France, Louis Philippe I, who belonged to the House of Orléans, a cadet branch of the Bourbons. Cadet branches of the Capetian House of Bourbon are still reigning over Spain and Luxembourg.

The dynasty had a crucial role in the formation of the French state. From a power base initially confined to their own demesne, the Île-de-France, the Capetian kings slowly but steadily increased their power and influence until it grew to cover the entirety of their realm. For a detailed narration on the growth of French royal power, see Crown lands of France. Members of the dynasty were traditionally Catholic, and the early Capetians had an alliance with the Church. The French were also the most active participants in the Crusades, culminating in a series of five Crusader kings – Louis VII, Philip Augustus, Louis VIII, Louis IX, and Philip III. The Capetian alliance with the papacy suffered a severe blow after the disaster of the Aragonese Crusade. Philip III's son and successor, Philip IV, arrested Pope Boniface VIII and brought the papacy under French control. The later Valois, starting with Francis I, ignored religious differences and allied with the Ottoman Empire to counter the growing power of the House of Habsburg. Henry IV was a Protestant at the time of his accession, but realized the necessity of conversion after four years of religious warfare.

The Capetians generally enjoyed a harmonious family relationship. By tradition, younger sons and brothers of the king of France were given appanages for them to maintain their rank and to dissuade them from claiming the French crown itself. When Capetian cadets did aspire for kingship, their ambitions were directed not at the French throne, but at foreign thrones. As a result, the Capetians have reigned at different times in the kingdoms of Portugal, Sicily and Naples, Navarre, Hungary and Croatia, Poland, Spain and Sardinia, grand dukedoms of Lithuania and Luxembourg, and in the Latin and Brazilian empires. In modern times, King Felipe VI of Spain is a member of this family, while Grand Duke Guillaume V of Luxembourg is related to the family by agnatic kinship; both through the Bourbon branch of the dynasty. Along with the House of Habsburg, arguably its greatest historic rival, it was one of the two oldest European royal dynasties. It was also one of the most powerful royal families in European history, having played a major role in its politics for much of its existence. According to Oxford University, 75% of all royal families in European history are related to the Capetian dynasty.

== Name origins and usage ==
The name of the dynasty derives from its founder, King Hugh, who was known as "Hugh Capet". The meaning of "Capet" (a nickname rather than a surname of the modern sort) is unknown. While folk etymology identifies it with "cape", other suggestions indicate it might be connected to the Latin word caput ("head"), and explain it as meaning "chief" or "head".

Historians in the 19th century (see House of France) came to apply the name "Capetian" to both the ruling house of France and to the wider-spread male-line descendants of Hugh Capet. It was not a contemporary practice. The name "Capet" has also been used as a surname for French royalty, particularly but not exclusively those of the House of Capet. One notable use was during the French Revolution, when the dethroned King Louis XVI (a member of the House of Bourbon and a direct male-line descendant of Hugh Capet) was referred to as Citizen Capet at his trial. His wife, Queen Marie Antoinette (a member of the House of Habsburg-Lorraine) were referred to as "Antoinette Capet" (the Queen being addressed as "the Widow Capet" after the execution of her husband).

== Capetian miracle ==
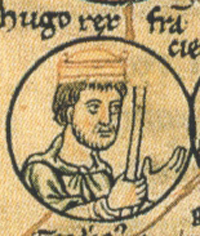
12th-century portrait of Hugh Capet. His direct descendants ruled France for many centuries.

The Capetian miracle (French: Miracle capétien) refers to the dynasty's ability to attain and hold onto the French crown.

In 987, Hugh Capet was elected to succeed Louis V of the Carolingian dynasty that had ruled France for over three centuries. By a process of associating elder sons with them in the kingship, the early Capetians established the hereditary succession in their family and transformed a theoretically electoral kingship into a sacral one. By the time of Philip II Augustus, who became king in 1180, the Capetian hold on power was so strong that the practice of associate kingship was dropped. While the Capetian monarchy began as one of the weakest in Europe, drastically eclipsed by the new Anglo-Norman realm in England (who, as dukes of Normandy, were technically their vassals) and even other great lords of France, the political value of orderly succession in the Middle Ages cannot be overstated. The orderly succession of power from father to son over such a long period of time meant that the French monarchs, who originally were essentially just the direct rulers of the Île-de-France, were able to preserve and extend their power, while over the course of centuries the great peers of the realm would eventually lose their power in one succession crisis or another.

By comparison, the Crusader Kingdom of Jerusalem was constantly beset with internal succession disputes because each generation only produced female heirs who tended to die young. Even the English monarchy encountered severe succession crises, such as the Anarchy of the 1120s between Stephen and Matilda, and the murder of Arthur I, Duke of Brittany, who by primogeniture was the heir of Richard I of England. The latter case would deal a severe blow to the prestige of King John, leading to the eventual destruction of the Angevin hegemony in France. In contrast, the French kings were able to maintain uncontested father-to-son succession from the time of Hugh Capet until the succession crisis which began the Hundred Years' War of the 14th century.

== Capetians through history ==
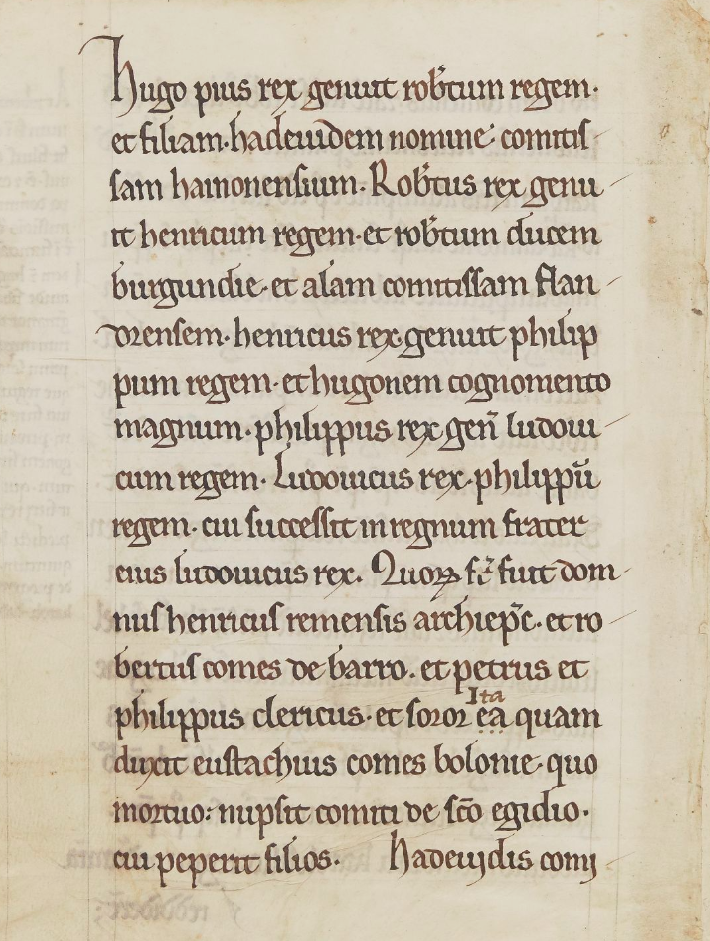
Hugh Capet's line, from the Genealogy of the Third Lineage of King of the Franks

Over the succeeding centuries, Capetians spread throughout Europe, ruling every form of feudal unit, from kingdoms to manors.

=== Salic law ===
Salic law, re-established during the Hundred Years' War from an ancient Frankish tradition, caused the French monarchy to permit only male (agnatic) descendants of Hugh to succeed to the throne of France.

Without Salic law, upon the death of John I, the crown would have passed to his half-sister, Joan (later Joan II of Navarre). However, Joan's paternity was suspect due to her mother's adultery in the Tour de Nesle Affair; the French magnates adopted Salic law to avoid the succession of a possible bastard.

In 1328, King Charles IV of France died without male heirs, as his brothers did before him. Philip of Valois, the late king's first cousin, acted as regent, pending the birth of the King's posthumous child, which proved to be a girl. Isabella of France, sister of Charles IV, claimed the throne for her son, Edward III of England. The English king did not find support among the French lords, who made Philip of Valois their king. From then on the French succession not only excluded females but also rejected claims based on the female line of descent.

Thus the French crown passed from the House of Capet after the death of Charles IV to Philip VI of France of the House of Valois, a cadet branch of the Capetian dynasty,

- then to Louis II, Duke of Orléans, of the Orléans branch of the Valois, who became Louis XII,
- then to Francis, Duke of Valois, Count of Angoulème, who became Francis I of France, and his descendants, of the Orléans-Angoulème,
- then to Henry III of Navarre, who became Henry IV of France, of the House of Bourbon, a cadet branch of the Capetian dynasty.

This did not affect monarchies not under that law such as Portugal, Spain, Navarre, and various smaller duchies and counties. Therefore, many royal families appear and disappear in the French succession or become cadet branches upon marriage. A complete list of the senior-most line of Capetians is available below.

=== Capetian cadet branches ===
The Capetian dynasty has been broken many times into (sometimes rival) cadet branches. A cadet branch is a line of descent from another line than the senior-most. This list of cadet branches shows most of the Capetian cadet lines and designating their royal French progenitor, although some sub-branches are not shown.

- Hugh Capet
  - Robert II of France
    - Henry I of France
      - Philip I of France
        - Louis VI of France
          - Louis VII of France
            - Philip II of France
              - Louis VIII of France
                - Louis IX of France
                  - Philip III of France
                    - Philip IV of France
                    - House of Valois
                    - House of Évreux
                  - House of Bourbon
                - House of Artois
                - House of Anjou
          - House of Dreux
          - House of Courtenay
      - House of Vermandois
    - House of Burgundy

==== Descendants of Philip III of France ====
- House of Valois (1293–1498)
  - House of Valois-Orléans (1392–1515)
    - House of Orléans-Angoulême (1407–1589)
  - House of Valois-Anjou (1356–1481)
  - House of Valois-Burgundy (1364–1477)
    - House of Burgundy-Brabant (1404–1430)
    - House of Burgundy-Nevers (1404–1491)
  - House of Valois-Alençon (1325–1525)
- House of Évreux (1303–1400)
  - House of Évreux-Navarre (1328–1425)

==== Descendants of Louis IX of France ====
- House of Bourbon (1268–1503)
  - House of Bourbon-Montpensier, counts (1443–1527)
  - House of Bourbon-La Marche (1356–1438)
    - House of Bourbon-Vendôme (became Royal House of France in 1589)
      - House of Artois (1775–1883)
      - House of Bourbon, Spanish branch (1700–present)
        - Carlists (1819–1936)
        - Alfonsines (1819–present)
          - House of Bourbon-Anjou (1933–present)
          - House of Bourbon, Spanish royal family (1933–present)
        - House of Bourbon-Seville (1823–present)
          - House of Bourbon-Seville, dukes of Santa Elena (1878–present)
        - House of Bourbon-Two Sicilies (1751–present)
        - House of Bourbon-Braganza (1752–1979)
        - House of Bourbon-Parma (1748–present)
          - Parma-Luxembourg, called House of Nassau-Weilburg (1919–present)
      - House of Orléans (1661–present)
        - Orléans-Nemours, then (1891) House of Orléans-Braganza (1864–present)
          - Orléans-Alençon (1844–1970)
        - Orléans-Aumale (1822–1872)
        - Orléans-Montpensier, then House of Orléans-Galliera (1824–present)
      - House of Bourbon-Condé (1557–1830)
        - House of Bourbon-Conti (1629–1814)
        - House of Bourbon-Soissons (1569–1641)
      - House of Bourbon-Montpensier, dukes (1477–1608)
    - House of Bourbon-Carency (1393–1520)
      - House of Bourbon-Duisant (1457–1530)
    - House of Bourbon-Preaux (1385–1429)

==== Descendants of Louis VIII of France ====
- House of Artois (1237–1472)
- House of Anjou (initially ruling house of Sicily, then of Naples, became ruling house of Hungary) (1247–1382)
  - House of Anjou-Naples (1309–1343)
  - House of Anjou–Taranto (1294–1374)
  - House of Anjou–Durazzo (1309–1414)

==== Descendants of Louis VI of France ====
- House of Dreux (1137–1345)
  - Breton House of Dreux (1213–1341)
    - House of Montfort (1322–1488)
- Capetian House of Courtenay (1150–1727)
  - Capetian House of Courtenay – Latin emperors of Constantinople (1217–1283)

==== Descendants of Henry I of France ====
- Capetian House of Vermandois (1085–1212)

==== Descendants of Robert II of France ====
- House of Burgundy (1032–1361)
  - Portuguese House of Burgundy (1109–1383)
    - House of Aviz (1385–1580) – illegitimate male-line descent from Burgundy
      - House of Braganza (1442–present) – illegitimate male-line descent from Aviz
        - House of Cadaval (1645–present), the male line went extinct in 2001

=== Sovereigns from the Capetian dynasty ===
==== Latin Empire ====
- Peter (1216–1217)
- Robert (1219–1228)
- Baldwin II (1228–1273, exiled in 1261)
- Philip I (1273–1283)
- Catherine I (1283–1307)
- Catherine II (1307–1346)
- Robert II (1346–1364)
- Philip II (1364–1374)

==== Kingdom of Albania ====
- Charles I (1272–1285)
- Charles II (1285–1294)
- Philip (1294–1331)
- Robert (1331–1332)
- John (1332–1336)
- Charles III (1336–1348)
- Joan I (1348–1368)
- Louis (1376–1383)

==== Kingdom of Etruria ====
- Louis (1801–1803)
- Charles Louis (1803–1807)

==== Kingdom of France ====
- Hugh (987–996)
- Robert II (996–1031)
- Henry I (1031–1060)
- Philip I (1060–1108)
- Louis VI (1108–1137)
- Louis VII (1137–1180)
- Philip II (1180–1223)
- Louis VIII (1223–1226)
- Louis IX (1226–1270)
- Philip III (1270–1285)
- Philip IV (1285–1314)
- Louis X (1314–1316)
- John I (1316)
- Philip V (1316–1322)
- Charles IV (1322–1328)
- Philip VI (1328–1350)
- John II (1350–1364)
- Charles V (1364–1380)
- Charles VI (1380–1422)
- Charles VII (1422–1461)
- Louis XI (1461–1483)
- Charles VIII (1483–1498)
- Louis XII (1498–1515)
- Francis I (1515–1547)
- Henry II (1547–1559)
- Francis II (1559–1560)
- Charles IX (1560–1574)
- Henry III (1574–1589)
- Henry IV (1589–1610)
- Louis XIII (1610–1643)
- Louis XIV (1643–1715)
- Louis XV (1715–1774)
- Louis XVI (1774–1792)
- Louis XVIII (1814–1815, 1815–1824)
- Charles X (1824–1830)
- Louis Philippe I (1830–1848)

==== Kingdom of Hungary ====
- Charles I (1310–1342)
- Louis I (1342–1382)
- Mary (1382–1385, 1386–1395)
- Charles II (1385–1386)

==== Kingdom of Naples ====
- Charles I (1266–1285)
- Charles II (1285–1309)
- Robert (1309–1343)
- Joan I (1343–1382)
- Charles III (1382–1386)
- Ladislas (1386–1414)
- Joan II (1414–1435)
- René I (1435–1442)
- Philip (1700–1707)
- Charles VII (1735–1759)
- Ferdinand IV (1759–1816)

==== Kingdom of Navarre ====
- Philip I (1284–1305)
- Louis I (1305–1316)
- John I (1316–1316)
- Philip II (1316–1322)
- Charles I (1322–1328)
- Joan II (1328–1349)
- Philip III (1328–1343)
- Charles II (1349–1387)
- Charles III (1387–1425)
- Blanche I (1425–1441)
- Anthony (1555–1562)
- Henry III (1572–1610)
- Louis II (1610–1643)
- Louis III (1643–1715)
- Louis IV (1715–1774)
- Louis V (1774–1792)
- Louis VII (1814–1815, 1815–1824)
- Charles V (1824–1830)
- Louis Philippe I (1830–1848)

==== Kingdom of Poland ====
- Louis (1370–1382)
- Hedwig (1384–1399)
- Henry (1573–1574)

==== Kingdom and County of Portugal ====
- Henry (1093–1112)
- Alphonse I (1112–1185, crowned in 1139)
- Sancho I (1185–1211)
- Alphonse II (1211–1223)
- Sancho II (1223–1247)
- Alphonse III (1247–1279)
- Denis (1279–1325)
- Alphonse IV (1325–1357)
- Peter I (1357–1367)
- Ferdinand I (1367–1383)

==== Kingdom of Sicily ====
- Charles I (1266–1282)
- Philip (1700–1713)
- Charles VII (1735–1759)
- Ferdinand III (1759–1816)

==== Kingdom of Spain ====
- Philip V (1700–1724, 1724–1746)
- Louis I (1724)
- Ferdinand VI (1746–1759)
- Charles III (1759–1788)
- Charles IV (1788–1808, 1808)
- Ferdinand VII (1808, 1813–1833)
- Isabella II (1833–1868)
- Alfonso XII (1874–1885)
- Alfonso XIII (1886–1931)
- Juan Carlos I (1975–2014)
- Philip VI (2014–)

==== Kingdom of the Two Sicilies ====
- Ferdinand I (1816–1825)
- Francis I (1825–1830)
- Ferdinand II (1830–1859)
- Francis II (1859–1860)

==== Grand Duchy of Lithuania ====
- Henry (1573–1574)

==== Grand Duchy of Luxembourg ====
- Jean (1964–2000)
- Henri (2000–2025)
- Guillaume V, Grand Duke of Luxembourg (2025–)

==== Duchy of Brabant ====
- Anthony (1406–1415)
- John IV (1415–1427)
- Philip I (1427–1430)
- Philip II (1430–1467)
- Charles (1467–1477)
- Mary (1477–1482)

==== Duchy of Brittany ====
- Peter I (1213–1237)
- John I (1237–1286)
- John II (1286–1305)
- Arthur II (1305–1316)
- John III (1312–1341)
- John IV (1341–1345)
- John V (1364–1399)
- John VI (1399–1442)
- Francis I (1442–1450)
- Peter II (1450–1457)
- Arthur III (1457–1458)
- Francis II (1458–1488)
- Anne (1488–1514)
- Claude (1514–1524)
- Francis III (1514–1524)
- Francis IV (1524–1536)
- Henry (1536–1547)

==== Duchy of Burgundy ====
- Otto of Paris (956–965)
- Odo-Henry (965–1002)
- Henry I (1026–1032)
- Robert I (1032–1076)
- Hugh I (1076–1079)
- Odo I (1079–1103)
- Hugh II (1103–1143)
- Odo II (1143–1162)
- Hugh III (1162–1192)
- Odo III (1192–1218)
- Hugh IV (1218–1272)
- Robert II (1272–1306)
- Hugh V (1306–1315)
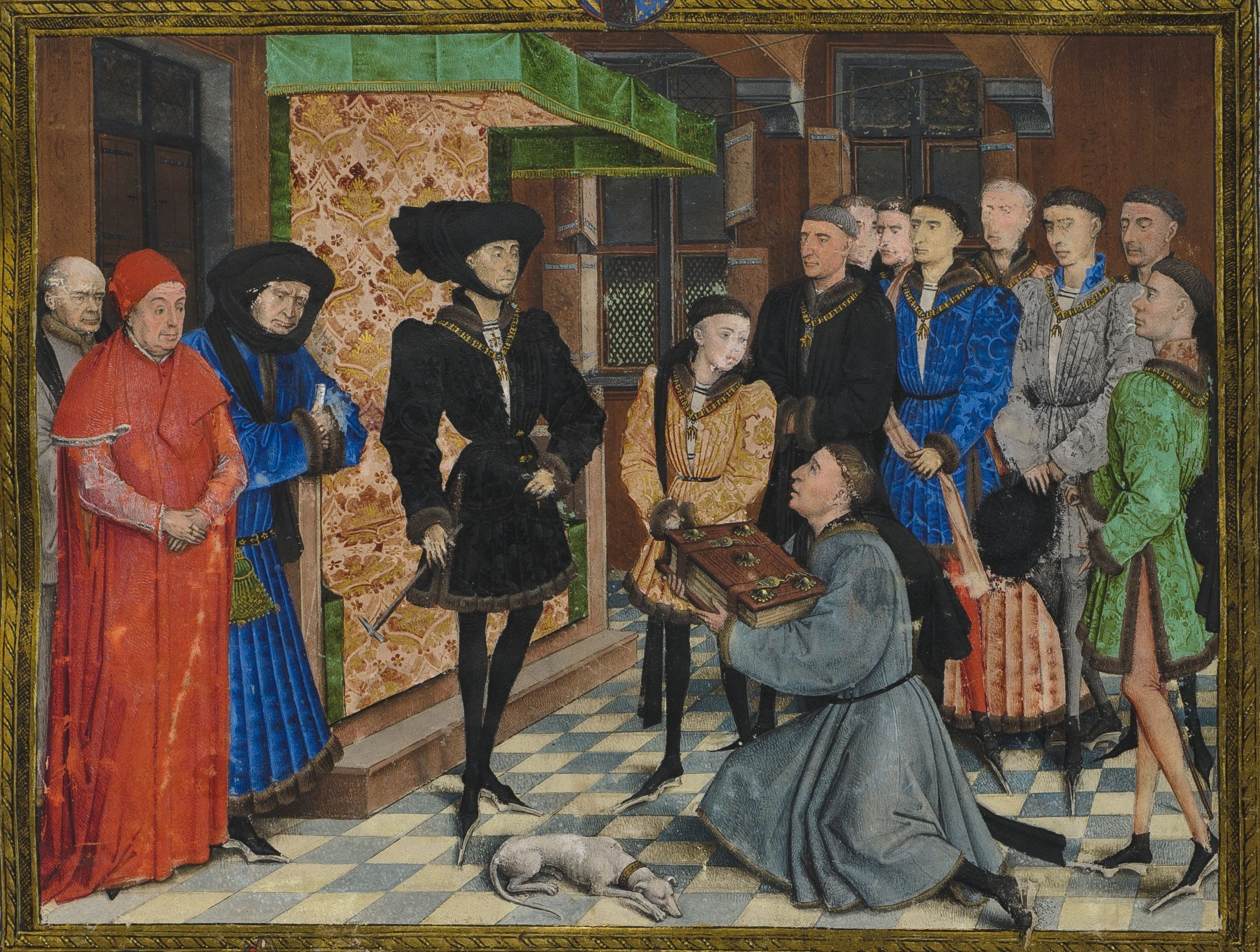
  Charles the Bold as a boy stands next to his father, Philip the Good, c. 1447–8
- Odo IV (1315–1349)
- Philip I (1349–1361)
- John I (1361–1363)
- Philip II (1363–1404)
- John II (1404–1419)
- Philip III (1419–1467)
- Charles (1467–1477)
- Mary (1477–1482)

==== Duchy of Lorraine ====
- René I (1431–1453)
- John II (1453–1470)
- Nicholas I (1470–1473)
- Yolande (1473–1473)

==== Duchy of Lucca ====
- Maria Louisa (1815–1824)
- Charles (1824–1847)

==== Duchy of Luxemburg ====
- Anthony (1411–1415)
- Philip I (1443–1467)
- Charles (1467–1477)
- Mary (1477–1482)
- Philip V (1700–1712)

==== Duchy of Milan ====
- Louis I (1499–1512)
- Francis II (1515–1521)
- Philip IV (1700–1714)

==== Duchy of Parma ====
- Charles I (1731–1735)
- Philip (1748–1765)
- Ferdinand (1765–1802)
- Charles II (1847–1849)
- Charles III (1849–1854)
- Robert I (1854–1859)

==== Principality of Achaea ====
- Charles I (1278–1285)
- Charles II (1285–1289)
- Philip I (1307–1313)
- Louis (1313–1316)
- Robert I (1318–1322)
- Robert II (1333–1364)
- Catherine II (1333–1346)
- Philip II (1364–1373)
- Joan I (1373–1381)
- Charles III (1383–1386)

==== Principality of Taranto ====
- Charles I (1266–1285)
- Charles II (1285–1294)
- Philip I (1294–1331)
- Robert II (1331–1346, 1362–1364)
- Louis (1346–1362)
- Philip II (1362–1374)
- Ladislaus (1406–1414)
- James (1414–1420)

==== Marquisate of Namur ====
- Philip II (1212–1226)
- Henry II (1226–1229)
- Margaret (1229–1237)
- Baldwin II (1237–1256)
- Philip IV (1421–1467)
- Charles I (1467–1477)
- Mary I (1477–1482)

=== Illegitimate descent ===
==== Empire of Brazil ====
- Peter I (1822–1831)
- Peter II (1831–1889)

==== Kingdom of Portugal ====
- John I (1385–1433)
- Edward (1433–1438)
- Alphonse V (1438–1481)
- John II (1481–1495)
- Manuel I (1495–1521)
- John III, (1521–1557)
- Sebastian, (1557–1578)
- Henry (1578–1580)
- Anthony (1580–1580, disputed)
- John IV (1640–1656)
- Alphonse VI (1656–1683)
- Peter II (1683–1706)
- John V (1706–1750)
- Joseph I (1750–1777)
- Peter III (1777–1786)
- Mary I (1777–1816)
- John VI (1816–1826)
- Peter IV (1826–1826)
- Mary II (1826–1828, 1834–1853)
- Michael I (1828–1834)

Kings of Belgium

- Leopold II of Belgium [r. 1865 - 1909]
- Albert I of Belgium [r. 1909 - 1934]
- Leopold III of Belgium [r. 1934 - 1951]
- Baudouin of Belgium [r. 1951 - 1993]
- Albert II of Belgium [r. 1993 - 2013]
- Philippe of Belgium [r. 2013 -

==== Kings of England, Great Britain, United Kingdom of Great Britain and Ireland, and the United Kingdom of Great Britain and Northern Ireland ====
- Edward III of England [r. 1327 - 1377]
- Richard II of England [r. 1377 - 1399 d. 1400]
- Henry IV of England [r. 1399 - 1413]
- Henry V of England [r. 1413 - 1422]
- Henry VI of England [r. 1422 - 1461, 1470 - 1471]
- Edward IV of England [r. 1461 - 1470, 1471 - 1483]
- Edward V of England [r. 1483]
- Richard III of England [r. 1483 - 1485]
- Henry VII of England [r. 1485 - 1509]
- Henry VIII of England [r. 1509 - 1547]
- Edward VI of England [r. 1547 - 1553]
- Lady Jane Grey [r. 1553]
- "Bloody Mary" Mary I of England [r. 1553 - 1558]
- Elizabeth I of England [r. 1558 - 1603]

Scottish and English Kings

- James VI of Scotland, and I of England. A 2x great-grandson of Henry VII. [Scotland: r. 1567 - 1625 r. 1603 - 1625
- Charles I of England [r. 1625 - 1649]

Commonwealth of England [1649 - 1660]

- Charles II of England [r. 1660 - 1685]. Son of Charles I and grandson of James VI and I
- James II of England, and VII of Scotland [r. 1685 - 1688]. Got deposed.
- Queen Mary II of England [r. 1688 - 1694] and her husband William III of the Dutch Republic and England [r. 1688 - 1702]
- Queen Anne of England [r. 1702 - 1714]

Kings of Great Britain

- George I of Great Britain [r. 1714 - 1727]
- George II of Great Britain [r. 1727 - 1760]

Kings of the United Kingdom of Great Britain and Ireland. Since 1801

- George III of Great Britain and from 1801, King of the UK [r. 1760 - 1820]. King during the American Revolution and made king of Hanover. Ireland joined in 1801.
- George IV of the UK [r. 1820 - 1830].
- William IV of the UK [r. 1830 - 1837]
- Queen Victoria of the UK [r. 1837 - 1901]
- King Edward VII of the UK [r. 1901 - 1910]

Kings of the United Kingdom of Great Britain and Northern Ireland since 1922

- George V of the UK [r. 1910 - 1936]
- Edward VIII of the UK [r. 1936]
- George VI of the UK [r. 1936 - 1952]
- Elizabeth II of the UK [r. 1952 - 2022]
- Charles III of the UK [r. 2022 -

== Senior Capets ==
Throughout most of history, the Senior Capet and the King of France were synonymous terms. Only in the time before Hugh Capet took the crown for himself and after the reign of Charles X is there a distinction such that the senior Capet must be identified independently from succession to the French Crown. However, since primogeniture and the Salic law provided for the succession of the French throne for most of French history, here is a list of all the French kings from Hugh until Charles, and all the Legitimist pretenders thereafter. All dates are for seniority, not reign.

King of France:

- Hugh, King of France (987–996)
- Robert II, King of France (996–1031)
- Henry I, King of France (1031–1060)
- Philip I, King of France (1060–1108)
- Louis VI, King of France (1108–1137)
- Louis VII, King of France (1137–1180)
- Philip II, King of France (1180–1223)
- Louis VIII, King of France (1223–1226)
- Louis IX, King of France (1226–1270)
- Philip III, King of France (1271–1285)
- Philip IV, King of France (1285–1314)
- Louis X, King of France (1314–1316)
- John I, King of France (1316–1316)
- Philip V, King of France (1316–1322)
- Charles IV, King of France (1322–1328)
- Philip VI, King of France (1328–1350)
- John II, King of France (1350–1364)
- Charles V, King of France (1364–1380)
- Charles VI, King of France (1380–1422)
- Charles VII, King of France (1422–1461)
- Louis XI, King of France (1461–1483)
- Charles VIII, King of France (1483–1498)
- Louis XII, King of France (1498–1515)
- Francis I, King of France (1515–1547)
- Henry II, King of France (1547–1559)
- Francis II, King of France (1559–1560)
- Charles IX, King of France (1560–1574)
- Henry III, King of France (1574–1589)
- Henry IV, King of France (1589–1610)
- Louis XIII, King of France (1610–1643)
- Louis XIV, King of France (1643–1715)
- Louis XV, King of France (1715–1774)
- Louis XVI, King of France (1774–1793)
- Louis XVII, King of France (1793–1795)
- Louis XVIII, King of France (1795–1824)
- Charles X, King of France (1824–1836)

Legitimist Pretenders:

- Louis Antoine, Duke of Angoulême (1836–1844)
- Henri, Count of Chambord, Count of Chambord (1844–1883)
- Infante Juan, Count of Montizón (1883–1887)
- Infante Carlos, Duke of Madrid (1887–1909)
- Infante Jaime, Duke of Madrid (1909–1931)
- Infante Alfonso Carlos, Duke of San Jaime (1931–1936)
- Alfonso XIII, King of Spain (1936–1941)
- Infante Jaime, Duke of Segovia (1941–1975)
- Alfonso, Duke of Anjou and Cádiz (1975–1989)
- Louis Alphonse, Duke of Anjou (1989–)

== The Capetian dynasty today ==
Many years have passed since the Capetian monarchs ruled a large part of Europe; however, they still remain as kings, as well as other titles. Currently two Capetian monarchs still rule in Spain and Luxembourg. In addition, seven pretenders represent exiled dynastic monarchies in Brazil, France, Spain, Portugal, Parma and Two Sicilies. The current legitimate, senior family member is Louis-Alphonse de Bourbon, known by his supporters as Duke of Anjou, who also holds the Legitimist (Blancs d'Espagne) claim to the French throne. Overall, dozens of branches of the Capetian dynasty still exist throughout Europe.

Except for the House of Braganza (founded by an illegitimate son of King John I of Portugal, who was himself illegitimate), all current major Capetian branches are of the Bourbon cadet branch. Within the House of Bourbon, many of these lines are themselves well-defined cadet lines of the House.

=== Current Capetian rulers ===
- Guillaume V, Grand Duke of Luxembourg (since 2025)
- Felipe VI, King of Spain (since 2014)

=== Current Capetian pretenders ===
- Louis Alphonse, Duke of Anjou, Legitimist pretender to the Kingdom of France since 1989.
- Prince Pedro, Duke of Calabria, Calabrian pretender to the Kingdom of the Two Sicilies since 2015.
- Prince Carlo, Duke of Castro, Castroist pretender to the Kingdom of the Two Sicilies since 2008.
- Carlos, Duke of Parma, pretender to the Duchy of Parma since 2010 and one of the Carlist pretenders to the Kingdom of Spain since 2010.
- Prince Sixtus Henry of Bourbon-Parma, the other Carlist pretender to the Kingdom of Spain since 1979.
- Jean, Count of Paris, Orléanist pretender to the Kingdom of France since 2019.
- Prince Pedro Carlos of Orléans-Braganza, Petrópolis pretender to the Empire of Brazil since 2007.
- Prince Bertrand of Orléans-Braganza, Vassouras pretender to the Empire of Brazil since 2022.
- Duarte Pio, Duke of Braganza, pretender to the Kingdom of Portugal since 1976.
- Balthazar Napoleon IV de Bourbon, Raja of Bhopal of the Bourbon-Bhopal dynasty
- Philippe, Count of Châlus of Bourbon-Busset

== Arms of cadet branches ==
Arms of branches founded before Philip Augustus

House of Burgundy

House of Vermandois

House of Dreux

House of Courtenay

Arms of branches founded after Philip Augustus

House of Artois

House of Anjou

House of Bourbon

House of Valois

House of Évreux

== Family tree ==
List of male-line members of the House of Capet

Male, male-line, legitimate, non-morganatic members of the house who either lived to adulthood, or who held a title as a child, are included. Heads of the house are in bold.

- **Hugh Capet**, 940-996 (**House of Capet**)
  - **Robert II of France**, 972–1031
    - Hugh of France, 1007–1025
    - **Henry I of France**, 1008–1060
      - **Philip I of France**, 1052–1108
        - **Louis VI of France**, 1081–1137
          - Philip of France, 1116–1131
          - **Louis VII of France**, 1120–1180
            - **Philip II of France**, 1165–1223
              - **Louis VIII of France**, 1187–1226
                - **Louis IX of France**, 1214–1270
                  - Louis of France, 1244–1260
                  - **Philip III of France**, 1245–1285
                    - **Philip IV of France**, 1268–1314
                      - **Louis X of France**, 1289–1316
                        - **John I of France**, 1316
                      - **Philip V of France**, 1291–1322
                      - **Charles IV of France**, 1294–1328
                    - Charles, Count of Valois, 1270-1325 (**House of Valois**)
                      - **Philip VI of France**, 1293–1350
                        - **John II of France**, 1319–1364
                          - **Charles V of France**, 1338–1380
                            - **Charles VI of France**, 1368–1422
                              - Louis, Duke of Guyenne, 1397–1415
                              - John, Duke of Touraine, 1398–1417
                              - **Charles VII of France**, 1403–1461
                                - **Louis XI**, 1423–1483
                                  - **Charles VIII of France**, 1470–1498
                                    - Charles Orlando, Dauphin of France, 1492–1495
                                - Charles of Valois, Duke of Berry, 1446–1472
                            - Louis I, Duke of Orléans, 1372–1407
                              - Charles I, Duke of Orléans, 1394–1465
                                - **Louis XII**, 1462–1515
                              - Philip, Count of Vertus, 1396–1420
                              - John, Count of Angoulême, 1399–1467
                                - Charles, Count of Angoulême, 1459–1496
                                  - **Francis I of France**, 1494–1547
                                    - Francis III, Duke of Brittany, 1518–1536
                                    - **Henry II of France**, 1519–1559
                                      - **Francis II of France**, 1544–1560
                                      - **Charles IX of France**, 1550–1574
                                      - **Henry III of France**, 1551–1589
                                      - Francis, Duke of Anjou, 1555–1584
                                    - Charles II of Valois, Duke of Orléans, 1522–1545
                          - Louis I of Anjou, 1339-1384 (**House of Valois-Anjou**)
                            - Louis II of Anjou, 1377–1417
                              - Louis III of Anjou, 1403–1434
                              - René of Anjou, 1409–1480
                                - John II, Duke of Lorraine, 1426–1470
                                  - Nicholas I, Duke of Lorraine, 1448–1473
                                - Louis of Anjou, Marquis of Pont-à-Mousson, 1427–1444
                              - Charles IV, Count of Maine, 1414–1472
                                - Charles IV of Anjou, 1446–1481
                            - Charles, Prince of Taranto, 1380–1404
                          - John, Duke of Berry, 1340–1416
                            - John of Valois, Count of Montpensier, 1376–1397
                          - Philip the Bold, 1342-1404 (**House of Valois-Burgundy**)
                            - John the Fearless, 1371–1419
                              - Philip the Good, 1396–1467
                                - Charles the Bold, 1433–1477
                            - Anthony, Duke of Brabant, 1384–1415
                              - John IV, Duke of Brabant, 1403–1427
                              - Philip I, Duke of Brabant, 1404–1430
                            - Philip II, Count of Nevers, 1389–1415
                              - Charles I, Count of Nevers, 1414–1464
                              - John II, Count of Nevers, 1415–1491
                        - Philip, Duke of Orléans, 1336–1375
                      - Charles II, Count of Alençon, 1297–1346
                        - Charles III, Count of Alençon, 1337–1375
                        - Philip of Alençon, 1339–1397
                        - Peter II, Count of Alençon, 1340–1404
                          - John I, Duke of Alençon, 1385–1415
                            - John II, Duke of Alençon, 1409–1476
                              - René, Duke of Alençon, 1454–1492
                                - Charles IV, Duke of Alençon, 1489–1525
                        - Robert of Alençon, 1344–1377
                    - Louis, Count of Évreux, 1276-1319 (**House of Évreux**)
                      - Charles d'Évreux, 1305–1336
                        - Louis I, Count of Étampes, 1336–1400
                        - John of Évreux, 1336–1373
                      - Philip III of Navarre, 1306–1343
                        - Charles II of Navarre, 1332–1387
                          - Charles III of Navarre, 1361–1425
                          - Peter, Count of Mortain, 1366–1412
                        - Philip, Count of Longueville, 1336–1363
                        - Louis, Duke of Durazzo, 1341–1376
                  - John Tristan, Count of Valois, 1250–1270
                  - Peter I, Count of Alençon, 1251–1284
                  - Robert, Count of Clermont, 1256-1317 (**House of Bourbon**)
                    - Louis I, Duke of Bourbon, 1279–1341
                      - Peter I, Duke of Bourbon, 1311–1356
                        - Louis II, Duke of Bourbon, 1337–1410
                          - John I, Duke of Bourbon, 1381-1434 (**House of Bourbon-Montpensier**)
                            - Charles I, Duke of Bourbon, 1401–1456
                              - John II, Duke of Bourbon, 1426–1488
                              - Charles II, Duke of Bourbon, 1433–1488
                              - Peter II, Duke of Bourbon, 1438–1503
                              - Louis de Bourbon, Bishop of Liège, 1438–1482
                              - James of Bourbon, 1445–1468
                            - Louis I, Count of Montpensier, 1405–1486
                              - Gilbert, Count of Montpensier, 1443–1496
                                - Louis II, Count of Montpensier, 1483–1501
                                - Charles III, Duke of Bourbon, 1490–1527
                                - François, Duke of Châtellerault, 1492–1515
                              - John of Montpensier, 1445–1485
                          - Louis of Bourbon, 1388–1404
                      - James I, Count of La Marche, 1319–1362
                        - Peter II, Count of La Marche, 1342–1362
                        - John I, Count of La Marche, 1344–1393
                          - James II, Count of La Marche, 1370–1438
                          - Louis, Count of Vendôme, 1376-1446 (**House of Bourbon-Vendôme**)
                            - John VIII, Count of Vendôme, 1425–1477
                              - Francis, Count of Vendôme, 1470–1495
                                - Charles, Duke of Vendôme, 1489–1537
                                  - Anthony of Navarre, 1518–1562
                                    - **Henry IV of France**, 1553–1610
                                      - **Louis XIII**, 1601–1643
                                        - **Louis XIV**, 1638–1715
                                          - Louis, Grand Dauphin, 1661–1711
                                            - Louis, Duke of Burgundy, 1682–1712
                                              - Louis, Duke of Brittany, 1704–1705
                                              - Louis, Duke of Brittany, 1707–1712
                                              - **Louis XV**, 1710–1774
                                                - Louis, Dauphin of France, 1729–1765
                                                  - Louis, Duke of Burgundy, 1751–1761
                                                  - Xavier, Duke of Aquitaine, 1753–1754
                                                  - **Louis XVI**, 1754–1793
                                                    - Louis Joseph, Dauphin of France, 1781–1789
                                                    - **Louis XVII**, 1785–1795
                                                  - **Louis XVIII**, 1755–1824
                                                  - **Charles X of France**, 1757–1836
                                                    - **Louis Antoine, Duke of Angoulême**, 1775–1844
                                                    - Charles Ferdinand, Duke of Berry, 1778–1820
                                                      - **Henri, Count of Chambord**, 1820–1883
                                                - Philippe, Duke of Anjou, 1730–1733
                                            - Philip V of Spain, 1683–1746 (**House of Bourbon-Anjou**)
                                              - Louis I of Spain, 1707–1724
                                              - Ferdinand VI, 1713–1759
                                              - Charles III of Spain, 1716–1788
                                                - Infante Philip, Duke of Calabria, 1747–1777
                                                - Charles IV of Spain, 1748–1819
                                                  - Ferdinand VII, 1784–1833
                                                  - Prince Charles Mary Isidore of Spain, 1788–1855
                                                    - Charles Louis of Bourbon, 1818–1861
                                                    - **Prince John, Count of Montizón**, 1822–1887
                                                      - **Prince Charles, Duke of Madrid**, 1848–1909
                                                        - **Prince James, Duke of Madrid**, 1870–1931
                                                      - **Prince Alphonse Charles, Duke of San Jaime**, 1849–1936
                                                    - Prince Ferdinand of Spain, 1824–1861
                                                  - Prince Francis de Paul of Spain, 1794–1865
                                                    - Francis of Assisi, Duke of Cádiz, 1822–1902
                                                      - Alfonso XII, 1857–1885
                                                        - **Alfonso XIII**, 1886–1941
                                                          - Alphonse, Prince of Asturias, 1907–1938
                                                          - **Prince James, Duke of Segovia**, 1908–1975
                                                            - **Alphonse, Duke of Anjou and Cádiz**, 1936–1989
                                                              - **Louis Alphonse of Bourbon**, b. 1974
                                                                - Louis of Bourbon, b. 2010
                                                                - Alphonse of Bourbon, b. 2010
                                                                - Henry of Bourbon, b. 2019
                                                            - Gonzalo, Duke of Aquitaine, 1937–2000
                                                          - Prince John, Count of Barcelona, 1913–1993
                                                            - John Charles I, b. 1938
                                                              - Philip VI of Spain, b. 1968
                                                          - Prince Gonzalo of Spain, 1914–1934
                                                    - Prince Henry, Duke of Seville, 1823–1870 (**House of Bourbon-Seville**)
                                                      - Henry, Duke of Seville, 1848–1894
                                                      - Francis de Paul of Seville, 1853–1942
                                                        - Francis of Seville, 1882–1952
                                                          - Francis of Seville, 1912–1995
                                                            - Francis, Duke of Seville, 1943–2025
                                                              - Francis of Seville, b. 1979
                                                                - Francis Maximus of Seville, b. 2017
                                                            - Alphonse Charles of Seville, 1945–2025
                                                              - Alphonse Nicholas of Seville, b. 1973
                                                                - Alphonse of Seville, b. 2014
                                                                - Jerome of Seville, b. 2017
                                                            - Henry of Seville, b. 1970
                                                        - Joseph Mary of Seville, 1883–1962, descendants unknown
                                                        - Henry Mary of Seville, 1891–1936, descendants unknown
                                                        - Alphonse Mary of Seville, 1893–1936, descendants unknown
                                                      - Albert, Duke of Santa Elena, 1854–1939
                                                        - Albert, Duke of Santa Elena, 1883–1959
                                                          - Alphonse Mary of Santa Elena, 1909–1938
                                                            - Albert Henry, Duke of Santa Elena, 1933–1995
                                                              - Alphonse, Duke of Santa Elena, b. 1961
                                                                - Alphonse of Santa Elena, b. 1995
                                                            - Alphonse of Santa Elena, 1937–2007
                                                              - Alphonse of Santa Elena, 1963–2005
                                                                - Alphonse of Santa Elena, b. 1999
                                                              - Ferdinand of Santa Elena, 1966–2025
                                                                - Ferdinand of Santa Elena, b. 2001
                                                                - Ignatius of Santa Elena, b. 2005
                                                              - James of Santa Elena, b. 1971
                                                    - Ferdinand of Bourbon, Prince of Spain, 1832–1854
                                                - Ferdinand I of the Two Sicilies, 1751-1825 (**House of Bourbon-Two Sicilies**)
                                                  - Francis I of the Two Sicilies, 1777–1830
                                                    - Ferdinand II of the Two Sicilies, 1810–1859
                                                      - Francis II of the Two Sicilies, 1836–1894
                                                      - Prince Louis, Count of Trani, 1838–1886
                                                      - Prince Alphonse, Count of Caserta, 1841–1934
                                                        - Prince Ferdinand Pius, Duke of Castro, 1869–1960
                                                        - Prince Charles of Bourbon-Two Sicilies, 1870–1949
                                                          - Prince Alphonse, Duke of Calabria, 1901–1964
                                                            - Prince Charles, Duke of Calabria, 1938–2015
                                                              - Prince Peter, Duke of Calabria, b. 1968
                                                                - Prince James, Duke of Noto, b. 1992
                                                                - Prince John of Bourbon-Two Sicilies, b. 2003
                                                                - Prince Paul of Bourbon-Two Sicilies, b. 2004
                                                                - Prince Peter of Bourbon-Two Sicilies, b. 2007
                                                          - Charles of Bourbon-Two Sicilies, 1908–1936
                                                        - Prince Gennaro of Bourbon-Two Sicilies, 1882–1944
                                                        - Prince Rainier, Duke of Castro, 1883–1973
                                                          - Prince Ferdinand, Duke of Castro, 1926–2008
                                                            - Prince Charles, Duke of Castro, b. 1963
                                                        - Prince Philip of Bourbon-Two Sicilies, 1885–1949
                                                          - Prince Gaetan of Bourbon-Two Sicilies, 1917–1984
                                                        - Prince Francis of Bourbon-Two Sicilies, 1888–1914
                                                        - Prince Gabriel of Bourbon-Two Sicilies, 1897–1975
                                                          - Prince Anthony of Bourbon-Two Sicilies, 1929–2019
                                                            - Prince Francis of Bourbon-Two Sicilies, b. 1960
                                                              - Prince Anthony of Bourbon-Two Sicilies, b. 2003
                                                            - Prince Gennaro of Bourbon-Two Sicilies, b. 1966
                                                          - Prince John of Bourbon-Two Sicilies, 1933–2000
                                                          - Prince Casimir of Bourbon-Two Sicilies, b. 1938
                                                            - Prince Louis Alphonse of Bourbon-Two Sicilies, b. 1970
                                                              - Prince Paul Alphonse of Bourbon-Two Sicilies, b. 2014
                                                            - Prince Alexander Henry of Bourbon-Two Sicilies, b. 1974
                                                      - Prince Gaetan, Count of Girgenti, 1846–1871
                                                      - Prince Pascal, Count of Bari, 1852–1904
                                                    - Charles Ferdinand, Prince of Capua, 1811–1862
                                                    - Prince Leopold, Count of Syracuse, 1813–1860
                                                    - Prince Anthony, Count of Lecce, 1816–1843
                                                    - Prince Louis, Count of Aquila, 1824–1897
                                                      - Prince Louis, Count of Roccaguglielma, 1845–1909
                                                      - Prince Philip of Bourbon-Two Sicilies, 1847–1922
                                                    - Prince Francis, Count of Trapani, 1827–1892
                                                      - Prince Leopold of the Two Sicilies, 1853–1870
                                                  - Leopold, Prince of Salerno, 1790–1851
                                                - Prince Gabriel of Spain, 1752-1788 (**House of Bourbon-Braganza**)
                                                  - Prince Peter Charles of Spain and Portugal, 1786–1812
                                                    - Prince Sebastian of Spain and Portugal, 1811–1875
                                                      - Francis Mary of Bourbon-Bourbon, 1st Duke of Marchena, 1861–1923
                                                      - Peter of Bourbon-Bourbon, 1st Duke of Dúrcal, 1862–1892
                                                        - Ferdinand Sebastian of Bourbon-Madán, 2nd Duke of Dúrcal, 1891–1944
                                                      - Louis Jesus of Bourbon-Bourbon, 1st Duke of Ansola, 1864–1889
                                                        - Louis Alphonse of Bourbon-Bernaldo de Quirós, 2nd Duke of Ansola, 1887–1942
                                                        - Manfred Louis of Bourbon-Bernaldo de Quirós, 3rd Duke of Ansola and 1st Duke of Hernani, 1889–1979
                                                      - Alphonse Mary of Bourbon-Bourbon, 1866–1934
                                                      - Gabriel Jesus of Bourbon-Bourbon, 1869–1889
                                                - Prince Anthony Pascal of Spain, 1755–1817
                                              - Philip, Duke of Parma, 1720-1765 (**House of Bourbon-Parma**)
                                                - Ferdinand I, Duke of Parma, 1751–1802
                                                  - Louis I of Etruria, 1773–1803
                                                    - Charles II, Duke of Parma, 1799–1883
                                                      - Charles III, Duke of Parma, 1823–1854
                                                        - Robert I, Duke of Parma, 1848–1907
                                                          - Henry, Duke of Parma, 1873–1939
                                                          - Joseph, Duke of Parma, 1875–1950
                                                          - Elijah, Duke of Parma, 1880–1959
                                                            - Robert Hugo, Duke of Parma, 1909–1974
                                                            - Prince Francis Alphonse of Bourbon-Parma, 1913–1939
                                                          - Prince Sixtus of Bourbon-Parma, 1886–1934
                                                          - Prince Xavier of Bourbon-Parma, 1889–1977
                                                            - Charles Hugo, Duke of Parma, 1930–2010
                                                              - Prince Charles, Duke of Parma, b. 1970
                                                                - Prince Charles Henry of Bourbon-Parma, b. 2016
                                                              - James of Bourbon-Parma, b. 1972
                                                            - Prince Sixtus Henry of Bourbon-Parma, b. 1940
                                                          - Prince Felix of Bourbon-Parma, 1893–1970
                                                            - John, Grand Duke of Luxembourg, 1921–2019
                                                              - Henry, Grand Duke of Luxembourg, b. 1955
                                                                - William V, Grand Duke of Luxembourg, b. 1981
                                                                  - Prince Charles, Hereditary Grand Duke of Luxembourg, b. 2020
                                                                  - Prince Francis of Luxembourg, b. 2023
                                                                - Prince Felix of Luxembourg, b. 1984
                                                                  - Prince Liam of Luxembourg, b. 2016
                                                                  - Prince Balthazar of Luxembourg, b. 2024
                                                                - Prince Louis of Luxembourg, b. 1986
                                                                  - Prince Gabriel of Luxembourg, b. 2006
                                                                  - Prince Noah of Luxembourg, b. 2007
                                                                - Prince Sebastian of Luxembourg, b. 1992
                                                              - Prince John of Luxembourg, b. 1957
                                                              - Prince William of Luxembourg, b. 1963
                                                                - Prince Paul-Louis of Luxembourg, b. 1998
                                                                - Prince Leopold of Luxembourg, b. 2000
                                                                - Prince John of Luxembourg, b. 2004
                                                            - Prince Charles of Luxembourg, 1927–1977
                                                              - Prince Robert of Luxembourg, b. 1968
                                                                - Prince Alexander of Luxembourg, b. 1997
                                                                - Prince Frederick of Luxembourg, 2002-2025
                                                          - Prince René of Bourbon-Parma, 1894–1962
                                                            - Prince James of Bourbon-Parma, 1922–1964
                                                              - Prince Philip of Bourbon-Parma, b. 1949
                                                                - James of Bourbon-Parma, b. 1986
                                                                - Joseph of Bourbon-Parma, b. 1989
                                                              - Prince Alan of Bourbon-Parma, b. 1955
                                                            - Michael of Bourbon-Parma, 1926–2018
                                                              - Eric of Bourbon-Parma, 1953–2021
                                                                - Prince Michael of Bourbon-Parma, b. 1989
                                                                - Prince Henry of Bourbon-Parma, b. 1991
                                                              - Prince Charles Emmanuel of Bourbon-Parma, b. 1961
                                                                - Prince Amaury of Bourbon-Parma, b. 1991
                                                            - Andrew of Bourbon-Parma, 1928–2011
                                                              - Axel of Bourbon-Parma, b. 1967
                                                                - Côme of Bourbon-Parma, b. 1997
                                                          - Louis of Bourbon-Parma, 1899–1967
                                                            - Guy of Bourbon-Parma, 1940–1991
                                                              - Louis of Bourbon-Parma, b. 1966
                                                                - Guy of Bourbon-Parma, b. 1995
                                                            - Prince Rémy of Bourbon-Parma, b. 1942
                                                              - Tristan of Bourbon-Parma, b. 1974
                                                            - Prince John Bernard of Bourbon-Parma, b. 1961
                                                              - Arnaud of Bourbon-Parma, b. 1989
                                                              - Christopher of Bourbon-Parma, b. 1991
                                                        - Prince Henry, Count of Bardi, 1851–1905
                                              - Prince Louis of Spain, 1727–1785
                                            - Charles, Duke of Berry, 1686–1714
                                          - Philip Charles, Duke of Anjou, 1667–1671
                                        - Philip I, Duke of Orléans, 1640-1701 (**House of Orléans**)
                                          - Philip II, Duke of Orléans, 1674–1723
                                            - Louis, Duke of Orléans, 1703–1752
                                              - Louis Philip I, Duke of Orléans, 1725–1785
                                                - Louis Philip II, Duke of Orléans, 1747–1793
                                                  - Louis Philip I, 1773–1850
                                                    - Ferdinand Philip, Duke of Orléans, 1810–1842
                                                      - Prince Philip, Count of Paris, 1838–1894
                                                        - Prince Philip, Duke of Orléans, 1869–1926
                                                        - Prince Ferdinand, Duke of Montpensier, 1884–1924
                                                      - Prince Robert, Duke of Chartres, 1840–1910
                                                        - Prince Robert of Orléans, 1866–1885
                                                        - Prince Henry of Orléans, 1867–1901
                                                        - Prince John, Duke of Guise, 1874–1940
                                                          - Henry, Count of Paris, 1908–1999
                                                            - Henry, Count of Paris, 1933–2019
                                                              - Prince Francis, Count of Clermont, 1961–2017
                                                              - John, Count of Paris, b. 1965
                                                                - Prince Gaston of Orléans, b. 2009
                                                                - Prince Joseph of Orléans, b. 2016
                                                                - Prince Alphonse of Orléans, b. 2023
                                                              - Prince Odo, Duke of Angoulême, b. 1968
                                                                - Prince Peter of Orléans, b. 2003
                                                            - Prince Francis, Duke of Orléans, 1935–1960
                                                            - Prince Michael, Count of Évreux, b. 1941
                                                              - Charles-Philip of Orléans, b. 1973
                                                              - Francis of Orléans, b. 1982
                                                                - Philip of Orléans, b. 2017
                                                                - Raphael of Orléans, b. 2021
                                                            - Prince James, Duke of Orléans, b. 1941
                                                              - Charles-Louis of Orléans, b. 1972
                                                                - Philip of Orléans, b. 1998
                                                                - Constantine of Orléans, b. 2003
                                                              - Fulk of Orléans, b. 1974
                                                            - Prince Theobald, Count of La Marche, 1948–1983
                                                              - Robert of Orléans, b. 1976
                                                    - Prince Louis, Duke of Nemours, 1814–1896
                                                      - Gaston, Count of Eu, 1842-1922 (**House of Orléans-Braganza**)
                                                        - Peter of Alcântara, Prince of Grão-Pará, 1875–1940
                                                          - Peter Gaston of Orléans-Braganza, 1913–2007
                                                            - Peter Charles of Orléans-Braganza, b. 1945
                                                              - Peter James of Orléans-Braganza, b. 1979
                                                              - Philip Roderick of Orléans-Braganza, b. 1982
                                                            - Prince Alphonse Edward of Orléans-Braganza, b. 1948
                                                            - Prince Manuel of Orléans-Braganza, b. 1949
                                                              - Prince Manuel of Orléans-Braganza, b. 1971
                                                            - Prince Francis of Orléans-Braganza, b. 1956
                                                              - Prince Francis of Orléans-Braganza, b. 1979
                                                              - Prince Gabriel of Orléans-Braganza, b. 1989
                                                          - Prince John Mary of Orléans-Braganza, 1916–2005
                                                            - Prince John Henry of Orléans-Braganza, b. 1954
                                                              - Prince John Philip of Brazil, b. 1986
                                                                - Prince John Anthony of Brazil, b. 2017
                                                        - Louis of Orléans-Braganza, 1878–1920
                                                          - Peter Henry of Orléans-Braganza, 1909–1981
                                                            - Louis of Orléans-Braganza, 1938–2022
                                                            - Prince Odo of Orléans-Braganza, 1939–2020
                                                              - Louis Philip of Orléans-Braganza, b. 1969
                                                                - Prince Maximilian of Brazil, b. 2012
                                                              - Prince Odo, b. 1977
                                                              - Prince Guy, b. 1984
                                                            - Bertrand of Orléans-Braganza, b. 1941
                                                            - Peter of Orléans-Braganza, b. 1945
                                                              - Prince Gabriel Joseph of Brazil, b. 1980
                                                                - Prince Gabriel Peter of Brazil, b. 2013
                                                            - Ferdinand of Orléans-Braganza, b. 1948
                                                            - Anthony of Orléans-Braganza, 1950–2024
                                                              - Peter Louis of Orléans-Braganza, 1983–2009
                                                              - Raphael of Orléans-Braganza, b. 1986
                                                            - Francis of Orléans-Braganza, b. 1955
                                                            - Albert of Orléans-Braganza, b. 1957
                                                              - Prince Peter Albert of Brazil, b. 1988
                                                              - Prince Anthony Albert of Brazil, b. 1997
                                                          - Prince Louis Gaston of Orléans-Braganza, 1911–1931
                                                        - Prince Anthony Gaston of Orléans-Braganza, 1881–1918
                                                      - Prince Ferdinand, Duke of Alençon, 1844–1910
                                                        - Prince Emmanuel, Duke of Vendôme, 1872–1931
                                                          - Prince Charles Philip, Duke of Nemours, 1905–1970
                                                    - Francis of Orléans, Prince of Joinville, 1818–1900
                                                      - Peter, Duke of Penthièvre, 1845–1919
                                                    - Henry of Orléans, Duke of Aumale, 1822–1897
                                                      - Louis of Orléans, Prince of Condé, 1845–1866
                                                      - Francis of Orléans, 1854–1872
                                                    - Anthony, Duke of Montpensier, 1824–1890
                                                      - Prince Anthony, Duke of Galliera, 1866–1930
                                                        - Prince Alphonse, Duke of Galliera, 1886–1975
                                                          - Prince Alvar, Duke of Galliera, 1910–1997
                                                            - Alphonse of Orléans-Bourbon, 1941–1975
                                                              - Alphonse of Orléans-Bourbon, Duke of Galliera, b. 1968
                                                                - Alphonse John of Orléans-Bourbon, b. 1994
                                                              - Alvar of Orléans-Bourbon, b. 1969
                                                                - Aiden of Orléans-Bourbon, b. 2009
                                                            - Alvar James of Orléans-Bourbon, b. 1947
                                                              - Andrew of Orléans-Bourbon, b. 1976
                                                                - Alvar of Orléans-Bourbon, b. c. 2013
                                                              - Alois of Orléans-Bourbon, b. 1979
                                                                - Alphonse of Orléans-Bourbon, b. 2010
                                                          - Alphonse of Orléans, 1912–1936
                                                          - Prince Ataúlfo of Orléans, 1913–1974
                                                        - Prince Louis Ferdinand of Spain, 1888–1945
                                                  - Anthony Philip, Duke of Montpensier, 1775–1807
                                                  - Louis Charles, Count of Beaujolais, 1779–1808
                                      - Gaston, Duke of Orléans, 1608–1660
                                  - Francis, Count of Enghien, 1519–1546
                                  - Charles I, Cardinal de Bourbon, 1523-1590 (disputed Charles X)
                                  - John, Count of Soissons and Enghien, 1528–1557
                                  - Louis I, Prince of Condé, 1530-1569 (**House of Bourbon-Condé**)
                                    - Henry I, Prince of Condé, 1552–1588
                                      - Henry II, Prince of Condé, 1588–1646
                                        - Louis, Grand Condé, 1621–1686
                                          - Henry Jules, Prince of Condé, 1643–1709
                                            - Louis III, Prince of Condé, 1668–1710
                                              - Louis Henry, Duke of Bourbon, 1692–1740
                                                - Louis Joseph, Prince of Condé, 1736–1818
                                                  - Louis Henry, Prince of Condé, 1756–1830
                                                    - Louis Anthony, Duke of Enghien, 1772–1804
                                              - Charles de Bourbon, Count of Charolais, 1700–1760
                                              - Louis, Count of Clermont, 1709–1771
                                        - Armand de Bourbon, Prince of Conti, 1629–1666
                                          - Louis Armand I, Prince of Conti, 1661–1685
                                          - Francis Louis, Prince of Conti, 1664–1709
                                            - Louis Armand II, Prince of Conti, 1695–1727
                                              - Louis Francis, Prince of Conti, 1717–1776
                                                - Louis Francis Joseph, Prince of Conti, 1734–1814
                                    - Francis of Bourbon, Prince of Conti, 1558–1614
                                    - Charles II of Bourbon-Vendôme, 1562–1594
                                    - Charles, Count of Soissons, 1566–1612
                                      - Louis, Count of Soissons, 1604–1641
                                - Francis de Bourbon, Count of St. Pol, 1491–1545
                                - Louis de Bourbon-Vendôme, 1493–1557
                              - Louis, Prince of La Roche-sur-Yon, 1473–1520
                                - Louis de Bourbon, Duke of Montpensier, 1513–1582
                                  - Francis of Bourbon, Duke of Montpensier, 1542–1592
                                    - Henry of Bourbon, Duke of Montpensier, 1573–1608
                                - Charles, Prince of La Roche-sur-Yon, 1515–1565
                          - John, Lord of Carency, 1378–1457, children by second wife declared legitimate in 1438 but not considered part of the royal house
                        - James of Bourbon-Préaux, 1346–1417
                          - Louis of Bourbon-Préaux, 1368–1415
                          - Pierre de Bourbon-Préaux, 1390–1422
                          - James II of Bourbon-Préaux, 1391–1429
                    - John of Charolais, 1283–1322
                    - Peter of Clermont, Archdeacon of Paris, 1287–1330
                - Robert I, Count of Artois, 1216-1250 (**House of Artois**)
                  - Robert II, Count of Artois, 1250–1302
                    - Philip of Artois, 1269–1298
                      - Robert III of Artois, 1287–1342
                        - John of Artois, Count of Eu, 1321–1387
                          - Robert IV of Artois, Count of Eu, 1356–1387
                          - Philip of Artois, Count of Eu, 1358–1397
                            - Charles of Artois, Count of Eu, 1394–1472
                        - James of Artois, 1325–1347
                        - Robert of Artois, 1326–1347
                        - Charles of Artois, Count of Pézenas, 1328–1385
                - Alphonse, Count of Poitiers, 1220–1271
                - Charles I of Anjou, 1226-1285 (**Capetian House of Anjou**)
                  - Charles II of Naples, 1254–1309
                    - Charles Martel of Anjou, 1271–1295
                      - Charles I of Hungary, 1288–1342
                        - Louis I of Hungary, 1326–1382
                        - Andrew, Duke of Calabria, 1327–1345
                        - Stephen of Anjou, 1332–1354
                    - Louis of Toulouse, 1274–1297
                    - Robert, King of Naples, 1276–1343
                      - Charles, Duke of Calabria, 1298–1328
                    - Philip I, Prince of Taranto, 1278–1331
                      - Charles of Taranto, 1296–1315
                      - Philip, Despot of Romania, 1300–1331
                      - Robert, Prince of Taranto, 1319–1364
                      - Louis I of Naples, 1320–1362
                      - Philip II, Prince of Taranto, 1329–1373
                    - Raymond Berengar of Andria, 1281–1307
                    - John, a priest, 1283–1308
                    - Peter Tempesta, 1291–1315
                    - John, Duke of Durazzo, 1294–1336
                      - Charles, Duke of Durazzo, 1323–1348
                      - Louis, Count of Gravina, 1324–1362
                        - Charles III of Naples, 1345–1386
                          - Ladislaus of Naples, 1377–1414
                      - Robert of Durazzo, 1326–1356
                  - Philip of Sicily, 1255–1277
              - Philip I, Count of Boulogne, 1200–1235, legitimated, but status as a member of the royal house unclear
                - Alberic, Count of Clermont, 1222–1284, descendants unknown
          - Henry of France, Archbishop of Reims, 1121–1175
          - Robert I, Count of Dreux, 1123-1188 (**House of Dreux**)
            - Simon, Lord of La Noue, 1141–1182
            - Robert II, Count of Dreux, 1154–1218
              - Robert III, Count of Dreux, 1185–1234
                - John I, Count of Dreux, 1215–1249
                  - Robert IV, Count of Dreux, 1241–1282
                    - John II, Count of Dreux, 1265–1309
                      - Robert V, Count of Dreux, 1293–1329
                      - John III, Count of Dreux, 1295–1331
                      - Peter, Count of Dreux, 1298–1345
                    - Robert of Dreux, Lord of Cateau-du-Loire
                  - John, a Knight Templar
                - Robert, Viscount of Châteaudun, 1217–1264
                - Peter, a cleric, 1220–1250
              - Peter I, Duke of Brittany, 1187–1250
                - John I, Duke of Brittany, 1218–1286
                  - John II, Duke of Brittany, 1239–1305
                    - Arthur II, Duke of Brittany, 1261–1312
                      - John III, Duke of Brittany, 1286–1341
                      - Guy of Penthièvre, Count of Penthièvre, 1287–1331
                      - Peter of Brittany, Lord of Dol-Combourg and St-Maloù, 1289–1312
                      - John of Montfort, 1295-1345 (**House of Montfort-Brittany**)
                        - John IV, Duke of Brittany, 1339–1399
                          - John V, Duke of Brittany, 1389–1442
                            - Francis I, Duke of Brittany, 1414–1450
                            - Peter II, Duke of Brittany, 1418–1457
                            - Giles of Brittany, 1420–1450
                          - Arthur III, Duke of Brittany, 1393–1458
                          - Giles of Brittany, Lord of Chantocé and Ingrande, 1394–1412
                          - Richard, Count of Étampes, 1396–1438
                            - Francis II, Duke of Brittany, 1433–1488
                    - John of Brittany, Earl of Richmond, 1266–1334
                    - Peter, Viscount of Leon, 1269–1312
                  - Peter, Lord of Dinan, 1241–1268
              - Henry of Dreux, Archbishop of Reims, 1193–1240
              - John of Braine, 1200–1240
            - Henry, Bishop of Orléans, 1155–1199
            - Philip of Dreux, 1158–1217
            - Peter, Lord of Bouconville-Vauclair, 1161–1186
            - William, Lord of Braye, 1163–1189
            - John, 1164–1189
          - Peter I of Courtenay, 1126-1183 (**Capetian House of Courtenay**)
            - Philip of Courtenay, 1153–1183
            - Peter II of Courtenay, 1155–1219
              - Philip II, Marquis of Namur, 1195–1226
              - Robert I, Latin Emperor, 1201–1228
              - Henry II, Marquis of Namur, 1206–1229
              - Baldwin II, Latin Emperor, 1217–1273
                - Philip I, Latin Emperor, 1243–1283
            - Robert, Lord of Champignelles, 1168–1239
              - Peter, Lord of Conches and Mehun, 1218–1250
              - Philip of Courtenay-Champignelles, 1221–1246
              - Ralph, Lord of Illiers, 1223–1271
              - Robert de Courtenay (1224-1279), bishop, 1224–1279
              - Jean Ier de Courtenay-Champignelles, bishop, 1226–1270
              - William of Courtenay-Champignelles, Lord of Venisy, 1228-1280 Genealogy in French
                - Robert de Courtenay-Champignelles, Archbishop of Reims, 1251–1324
                - Peter of Courtenay-Champignelles, 1259–1290
                - John I, Lord of Champignelles, 1265–1318
                  - John II, Lord of Champignelles, 1291–1334
                  - John III, Lord of Champignelles, 1330–1392
                  - Peter II, Lord of Champignelles, 1334–1394
                    - Peter III, Lord of Champignelles and St-Brisson, 1377–1411
                      - John IV, 1410–1472
                    - John I, Lord of Bléneau, 1379–1460
                      - John II, Lord of Bléneau, 1425–1480
                        - John III, Lord of Bléneau, 1465–1511
                          - Francis I, Lord of Bléneau, 1495–1561
                            - Gaspard I, Lord of Bléneau, 1550–1609
                              - Francis II of Bléneau, 1575–1602
                              - Edmé, Lord of Bléneau, 1577–1640
                                - Gaspard II, Lord of Bléneau, 1602–1655
                              - Claude, 1582–1612
                          - John, Lord of Salles and Coudray, 1559–1624
                          - Philip, abbot of Lauroy, 1497–1547
                          - Edmé, Lord of Villars, 1501–1553
                          - John, knight of Malta, b. 1505
                      - William of Courtenay, Lord of Coquetaine-en-Brie, 1427–1485
                      - Peter, Lord of La Ferté-Loupière, 1429–1504
                        - Hector, Lord of La Ferté-Loupière, 1475–1549
                          - René, Lord of La Ferté-Loupière, 1510–1562
                          - Philip, Lord of Villeneuve-la-Cornue, 1512–1552
                        - John, Lord of Chevillon, 1477–1534
                          - James, Lord of Chevillon, 1515–1557
                          - William, Lord of Chevillon, 1520–1592
                            - James II, Lord of Chevillon, 1556–1617
                            - René, an abbot, 1561-c. 1638
                            - John II, Lord of Chevillon, 1566–1639
                              - Louis I, Lord of Chevillon, 1610–1672
                                - Louis-Charles, Lord of Chevillon, 1640–1723
                                  - Louis Gaston, 1669–1691
                                  - Charles Roger, Lord of Chevillon, 1671–1730
                                - Roger of Courtenay, abbot in Auxerre, 1647–1733
                                - Jean-Armand, 1652–1677
                              - Robert, 1619-after 1647
                        - Charles, Lord of Bontin, 1480–1511
                        - Louis I, Lord of Ville-au-Tartre, 1485–1540
                          - Francis, Lord of Bontin, 1526–1578
                          - Louis II, Lord of Bontin, 1527–1565
                        - Peter, Lord of Martroy, 1487–1525
                        - Edmé, Lord of Frauville, 1489–1516
                      - Peter, Lord of Arrablay, 1433–1461
                      - Charles, Lord of Arrablay, 1434–1488
                        - Francis, Lord of Arrablay, 1485–1540
                  - Philip, Lord of La Ferté-Loupière, 1292–1346
                    - John I, Lord of La Ferté-Loupière, 1346–1412
                      - John II, Lord of La Ferté-Loupière, 1388–1438
                  - Robert, a monk, 1296–1331
                  - William, vidame of Reims, 1299–1331
                  - Stephen, a priest, 1305–1348
                  - Peter, Lord of Autry, 1305–1348
            - William, Lord of Tanlay, c. 1172–1248
              - Robert I, Lord of Tanlay, 1205–1260
                - John I, Lord of Tanlay, 1230–1285
                  - Robert II, Lord of Tanlay, 1260–1310
                    - William II, Lord of Tanlay, b. 1285
                      - Robert III, Lord of Tanlay, 1307–1346
                      - John II, Lord of Tanlay, 1308–1342
                      - Philip II, Lord of Tanlay, 1320–1384
                        - Peter of Tanlay, 1352–1383
                        - Stephen, Lord of Ravières, 1356–1383
                    - Philip, a prior, 1292-after 1315
                  - Stephen, Lord of Tanerre, 1262–1332
                  - Philip, Lord of Ravières, 1264–1300
                  - John, abbot of Quincey, 1266–1300
              - John of Tanlay, d. after 1248
          - Philip of France, Archdeacon of Paris, 1132–1160
        - Philip, Count of Mantes, 1093–1133
        - Fleury, Lord of Nangis, 1095–1119
      - Hugh, Count of Vermandois, 1057–1101
        - Ralph I, Count of Vermandois, d. 1152
          - Ralph II, Count of Vermandois, 1145–1167
        - Henry, Lord of Chaumont-en-Vexin, 1091–1130
        - Simon I of Vermandois, 1093–1148
    - Robert I, Duke of Burgundy, 1011–1076, (**House of Burgundy**)
      - Hugh of Burgundy, 1034–1059
      - Henry of Burgundy, 1035–1070
        - Hugh I, Duke of Burgundy, 1057–1093
        - Odo I, Duke of Burgundy, 1060–1103
          - Hugh II, Duke of Burgundy, 1084–1143
            - Odo II, Duke of Burgundy, 1118–1162
              - Hugh III, Duke of Burgundy, 1142–1192
                - Odo III, Duke of Burgundy, 1166–1218
                  - Hugh IV, Duke of Burgundy, 1213–1272
                    - Odo, Count of Nevers, 1230–1266
                    - John of Burgundy, 1231–1268
                    - Robert II, Duke of Burgundy, 1248–1306
                      - Hugh V, Duke of Burgundy, 1284–1315
                      - Odo IV, Duke of Burgundy, 1295–1348
                        - Philip I, Count of Auvergne, 1323–1346
                      - Louis of Burgundy, 1297–1316
                      - Robert, Count of Tonnerre, 1302–1334
                    - Hugh, viscount of Avallon
                - Alexander, Lord of Montaigu, 1170–1206
                - Guigues VI of Viennois, 1184–1237
                  - Guigues VII of Viennois, 1225–1269
                    - John I of Viennois, 1264–1282
            - Gauthier, Archbishop of Besançon, 1120–1180
            - Hugh le Roux, 1121–1171
              - William of Châtelet-Chalon
            - Robert, Bishop of Autun, 1122–1140
            - Henry, Bishop of Autun, 1124–1170
            - Raymond, Count of Grignon, 1125–1156
          - Henry, a priest, 1087–1125
        - Robert of Burgundy (bishop of Langres), 1059–1111
        - Raynald I, abbot of Flavigny, 1059–1090
        - Henry, Count of Portugal, 1066-1112 (**Portuguese House of Burgundy**)
          - Alphonse I of Portugal, 1109–1185
            - Sancho I of Portugal, 1154–1211
              - Alphonse II of Portugal, 1185–1223
                - Sancho II of Portugal, 1209–1248
                - Alphonse III of Portugal, 1210–1279
                  - Denis of Portugal, 1261–1325
                    - Alphonse IV of Portugal, 1291–1357
                      - Peter I of Portugal, 1320–1367
                        - Ferdinand I of Portugal, 1345–1383
                  - Alphonse of Portugal, Lord of Portalegre, 1263–1312
                - Ferdinand, Lord of Serpa, 1217–1246
              - Peter I, Count of Urgell, 1187–1258
              - Ferdinand, Count of Flanders, 1188–1233
      - Robert of Burgundy, 1040–1113
      - Simon of Burgundy, 1045–1087
    - Odo of France, mentally incapacitated, 1013–1059

== See also ==
- French monarchs family tree
- Genealogiae scriptoris Fusniacensis
- Capetian Armorial

== Bibliography ==
- Bordonove, Georges (1986). Hugues Capet, le fondateur. Paris: Pygmalion. ISBN 2-85704-187-X.
- Naus, James (2016). Constructing kingship : the Capetian monarchs of France and the early Crusades. Manchester University Press. ISBN 9780719090974.
- Fawtier, Robert (1960). The Capetian Kings of France: Monarchy & Nation (987–1328). Macmillan.
- Hallam, Elizabeth M. (2019). Capetian France 987–1328. London: Taylor and Francis. ISBN 978-1-138-88768-8.
- Le Hête, Thierry (1987). Les Capetiens: Le Livre du Millenaire. Paris: Editions Christian. ISBN 2-86496-026-5.
- Brown, Elizabeth (1991). Politics and Institutions in Capetian France. London: Routledge. ISBN 978-1-138-37539-0.
- Firnhaber-Baker, Justine (2024). House of Lilies: The Dynasty That Made Medieval France. Basic Books. ISBN 978-1-5416-0477-3.
- Krause, Ingmar (2006). Konflikt und Ritual im Herrschaftsbereich der frühen Capetinger – Untersuchungen zur Darstellung und Funktion symbolischen Verhaltens (in German). Münster: Rhema-Verlag. ISBN 978-3-930454-62-4.
- Wenzler, Claude (2010). Genealogy of the Kings of France. Rennes: Quest. ISBN 2-7373-3185-4.
- Labarge, Margaret Wade (1968). Saint Louis : Louis IX, most Christian King of France. Boston: Little, Brown.
- de Guibours, Pierre (1725). Histoire Généalogique et chronologique de la Maison royale de France, des pairs, grands officiers de la couronne et de la maison du roy, et des anciens barons du royaume: Avec les qualitez, l'origine, le progrès et les armes de leurs familles; Ensemble les statuts & le catalogue des chevaliers, commandeurs & officiers de l'ordre du Saint-Esprit.Le tout dressé sur titres originaux,Sur les registres des chartes du roy, du parlement, de la chambre des comptes & du Châtelet de Paris, cartulaires, manuscrits de la bibliothèque du roy & d'autres cabinets curieux. Vol. I. Paris: Firmin Didot Frères, Fils et Cie.
