= Francisco de Borbón y Borbón =

Spanish aristocrat (1912–1995)

- Born: 16 November 1912; Santander, Spain
- Died: 18 November 1995 (aged 83); Villaviciosa de Odón, Spain
- Family: Bourbon
- Spouses: Enriqueta Escasany y Miquel (m. 1942; died 1962) María García de Lóbez y Salvador (m. 1967)
- Issue: Francisco de Borbón y Escasany; Alfonso Carlos de Borbón y Escasany; Enrique de Borbón y García de Lóbez
- Father: Francisco de Borbón y de la Torre
- Mother: Enriqueta de Borbón y Parade, 4th Duchess of Seville

Francisco de Paula Enrique María Luis de Borbón y Borbón (16 November 1912 – 18 November 1995) was a Spanish aristocrat and a distant relative of the Spanish royal family. He served as a Lieutenant General and commander of the cavalry in the Spanish Army.

== Life and family ==
He was born in Santander as the youngest child and second son of Francisco de Borbón y de la Torre (1882–1953) and his wife, Enriqueta de Borbón y Parade, 4th Duchess of Seville (1888–1967). He descended from a morganatic line of the Spanish branch of the House of Bourbon and was a relative of King Juan Carlos I of Spain. He renounced his rights to succeed to his mother's ducal title in 1968, in favour of his elder son.

=== Marriages and issue ===
He was married on 4 October 1942 at Madrid to Enriqueta Escasany y Miquel (13 October 1925 in Málaga – 16 May 1962 in Málaga), daughter of Ignacio Escasany y Ancell and Enriqueta de Miquel y Mas, 2nd Marquesa de Pobla de Claramunt. The couple had two sons:

- Francisco de Borbón y Escasany, 5th Duke of Seville (16 November 1943 in Madrid – 20 May 2025 in Madrid)

∞ Countess Beatrice Wilhelmine Paula von Hardenberg (28 June 1947 in Donaueschingen – 14 March 2020 in Marbella), daughter of Count Günther von Hardenberg [ de ] and Princess Maria Josepha Egona zu Fürstenberg, on 7 July 1973 at Baden-Baden, and divorced on 30 June 1989 in Madrid, with issue:

- Olivia Enriqueta María Josefa de Borbón y Hardenberg (born 6 April 1974 in London)

∞ Julián Porras-Figueroa Toledano (born 3 October 1982 in Castilla la Mancha) on 4 October 2014 at Marbella, with issue:

- Flavia María Josepha Porras y de Borbón (born 30 November 2016)
- Fernando Enrique Porras y de Borbón (born 14 August 2018)

- Cristina Elena de Borbón y Hardenberg (2 September 1975 in Madrid – 13 February 2020 in Madrid)
- Francisco de Paula Joaquín de Borbón y Hardenberg (born 21 January 1979 in Madrid)

∞ Sophie Elizabeth Karoly, on 9 October 2021, with issue:

- Francisco Máximo de Borbón y Karoly (born 2017)

∞ Isabelle Eugénie Karanitsch (born 23 November 1959 in Vienna), daughter of Franz M. Karanitsch and Tatjana Cimlov Karacevcev, on 19 October 1991 at Vienna, and divorced on 17 June 1993 in Madrid, without issue.
∞ María de los Ángeles de Vargas-Zúñiga y Juanes (born 19 November 1954 in Lugo), daughter of Manuel de Vargas-Zúñiga y la Calzada and María de los Ángeles de Juanes y Lago, on 2 September 2000 at Marbella, without issue (however, she has two children from a previous marriage to Ernesto Díaz Bastien).

- Alfonso Carlos de Borbón y Escasany (10 February 1945 in Madrid – 10 May 2025 in Madrid)

∞ María Luisa Yordi y Villacampa (born 15 April 1949 in Madrid), daughter of Lucian Yordi and María Luisa Villacampa, on 2 July 1971 at Madrid, with issue:

- Alfonso Nicolás Enrique de Borbón y Yordi (born 16 November 1973 in Madrid)

∞ María Eugenia Silva Hernández-Mancha (born 13 January 1976 in Madrid), daughter of Antonio Silva Jaraquemada and María Eugenia Hernández Mancha, with issue:
- Alfonso de Borbón y Silva (born 1 April 2014 in Madrid)
- Jerónimo de Borbón y Silva (born 14 June 2017 in Madrid)

- Alejandra María Luisa de Borbón y Yordi (born 24 May 1976 in Madrid)

∞ Juan Bosco de Ussía Hornedo, son of Alfonso de Ussía y Muñoz-Seca and María del Pilar Hornedo y Muguiro, on 20 June 2008 at Guadalajara, with issue:
- Tristan de Ussía y Borbón (born 31 October 2011 in Madrid)
- Santiago de Ussía y Borbón (born 31 October 2011 in Madrid)

Francisco married for the second time on 15 March 1967 at Madrid to María Josefa García de Lóbez y Salvador (11 December 1928 in Madrid – 28 March 2002 in Madrid), daughter of Nicolas García de Lóbez and Dolores Salvador. They had one son:

- Enrique Ignacio de Borbón y García de Lóbez (born 18 March 1970 in Madrid)

== Order of Saint Lazarus ==
Arms as Grand Master of the Order of Saint Lazarus

- Order of Saint Lazarus (statuted 1910)
  - Grand Master (1956–1967 and 1973–1995); elected after the death of his father
  - Coadjutor (1935)

During his tenure, the order suffered a schism which led to the development of two obediences, termed the Malta Obedience and the Paris Obedience. He continued to lead the Malta Obedience until his death in 1995. Under his leadership, a 1986 attempt to reunite the two obediences proved unsuccessful; they were subsequently reunited in 2008, after his death.

== Patrilineal descent ==
Patrilineal descent

Francisco's patriline is the line from which he is descended from father to son.

Patrilineal descent is the principal behind membership in royal houses, as it can be traced back through the generations, which means that Francisco is a member of the House of Bourbon.

House of Bourbon

1. Robert of Hesbaye, c. 765–807
2. Robert III of Worms, 800–834
3. Robert the Strong, 820–866
4. Robert I of France, 866–923
5. Hugh the Great, 898–956
6. Hugh Capet, c. 939–996
7. Robert II of France, 972–1031
8. Henry I of France, 1008–1060
9. Philip I of France, 1052–1108
10. Louis VI of France, 1081–1137
11. Philip II of France, 1165–1223
12. Louis VIII of France, 1187–1226
13. Louis IX of France, 1214–1270
14. Robert, Count of Clermont, 1256–1317
15. Louis I, Duke of Bourbon, 1279–1342
16. James I, Count of La Marche, 1319–1362
17. John I, Count of La Marche, 1344–1393
18. Louis, Count of Vendôme, 1376–1446
19. John VIII, Count of Vendôme, 1426–1478
20. Francis, Count of Vendôme, 1470–1495
21. Charles, Duke of Vendôme, 1489–1537
22. Antoine of Navarre, Duke of Vendôme, 1518–1562
23. Henry IV of France, 1553–1610
24. Louis XIII of France, 1601–1643
25. Louis XIV of France, 1638–1715
26. Louis, Grand Dauphin of France, 1661–1711
27. Philip V of Spain, 1683–1746
28. Charles III of Spain, 1716–1788
29. Charles IV of Spain, 1748–1819
30. Infante Francisco de Paula of Spain, 1794–1865
31. Infante Enrique, Duke of Seville, 1823–1870
32. Francisco de Paula de Borbón y Castellví, 1853–1942
33. Francisco de Borbón y de la Torre, 1882–1952
34. Francisco de Borbón y Borbón, 1912–1995
