= María Luisa de Borbón y Parade, 3rd Duchess of Seville =

Spanish aristocrat

The Most Excellent The Duchess of Seville Grandee of Spain
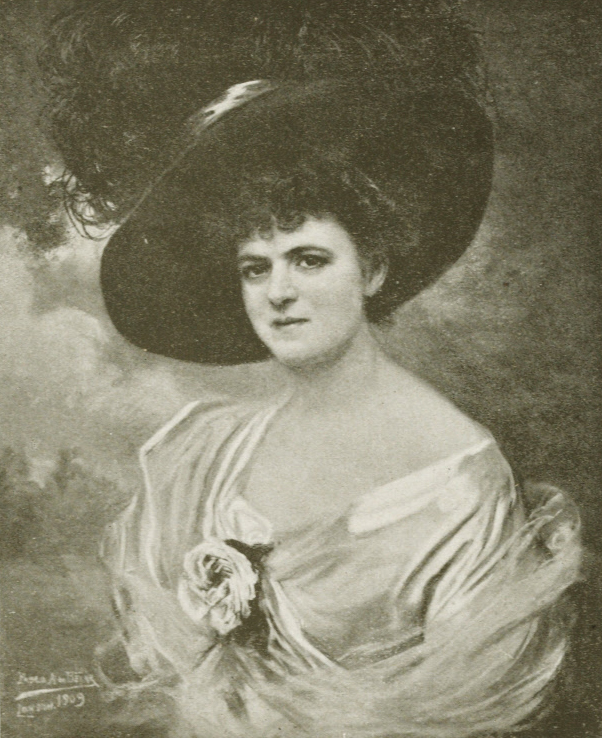
- María Luisa in 1911

3rd Duchess of Seville
- Tenure: 15 July 1895 – 2 July 1919
- Predecessor: Enrique de Borbón y Castellví, 2nd Duke of Seville
- Successor: Enriqueta de Borbón y Parade, 4th Duchess of Seville
- Born: 4 April 1868; Madrid, Spain
- Died: 1945 (aged 76–77); Madrid, Spain
- Family: Bourbon
- Spouse: Juan de Monclús y Cabanellas
- Parents: Enrique de Borbón y Castellví, 2nd Duke of Seville (father); Joséphine Parade (mother)

María Luisa Enriqueta Josefina de Borbón y Parade, 3rd Duchess of Seville (1868–1945) was a Spanish aristocrat.

== Biography ==
María Luisa was the daughter of Enrique de Borbón y Castellví, 2nd Duke of Seville and a member of the House of Bourbon.

She married Don Juan de Monclus y Cabanellas.
