= Eugenia Silva =

Spanish model (born 1976)

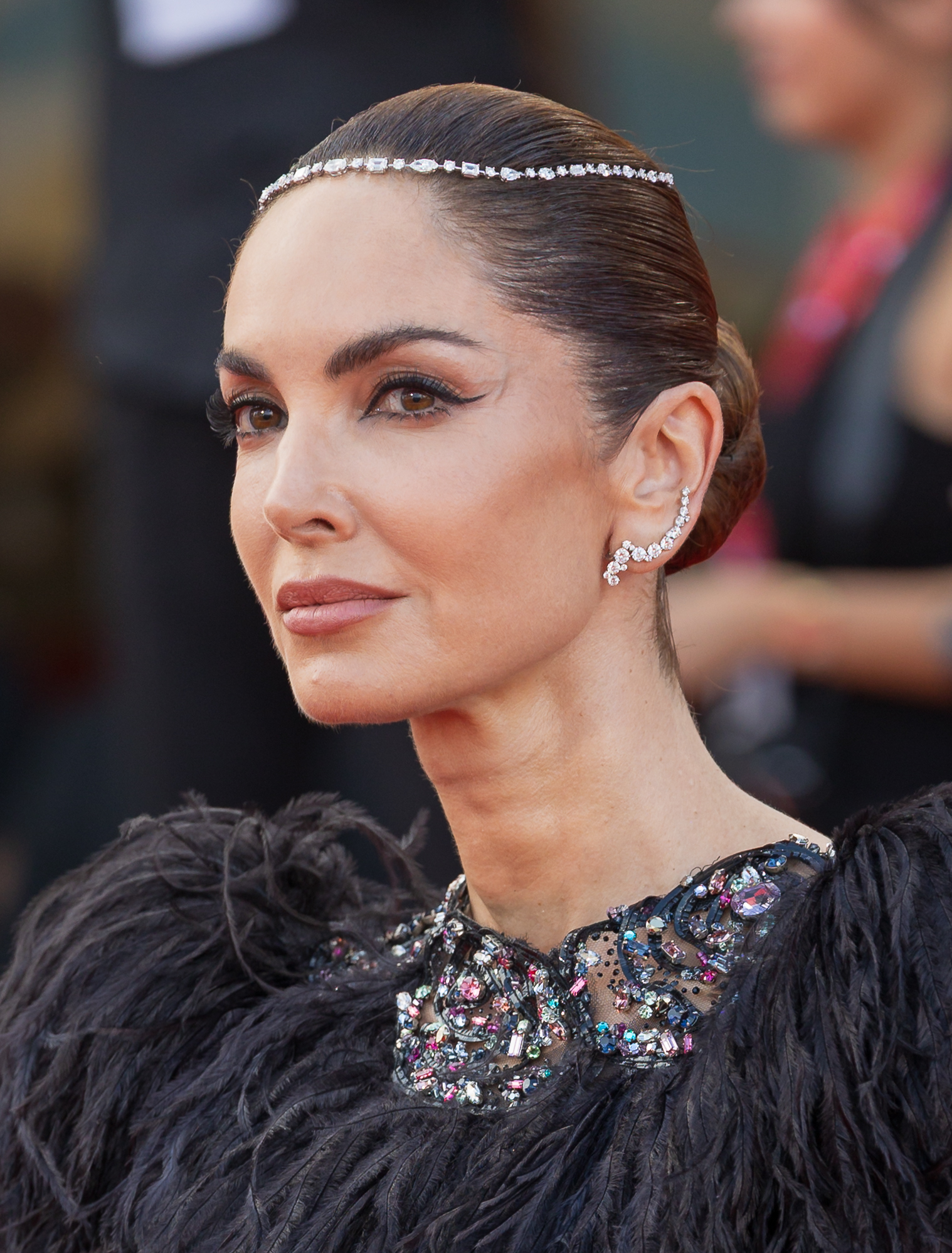
- Silva at the 82nd Venice International Film Festival in 2025
- Born: María Eugenia Silva Hernández-Mancha; 13 January 1976 (age 50); Madrid, Spain
- Partner: Alfonso de Borbón y Yordi
- Children: 2
- Modeling information
- Height: 1.77 m (5 ft 9 1/2 in)
- Hair color: Dark brown
- Eye color: Brown
- Agency: The Model CoOp (New York); d'management group (Milan); Models 1 (London); Elite Model Management (Amsterdam); View Management (Barcelona); Munich Models (Munich)

María Eugenia Silva Hernández-Mancha (born 13 January 1976), better known as Eugenia Silva, is a Spanish model. She has been the face of many fashion houses such as Dolce & Gabbana and Oscar de la Renta.

== Career ==
Her first fashion contact was in 1992, when Eugenia Silva was 16. She competed in the Elite Look of the Year Award, starting her career in fashion.

Eugenia Silva grew up in a family of jurists; Antonio Hernández Mancha is her uncle. She graduated in Law from Colegio Universitario Cardenal Cisneros, which is affiliated with Madrid's Complutense University.

Her career took off when she moved to New York City, where she was chosen to be the face of Oscar de la Renta. Throughout her career, she has appeared in many advertisement campaigns, including Armani, Loewe, Oscar de la Renta, Pantene, Dolce & Gabbana, Carrera y Carrera, Escada, Garnier, Intimissimi, Magnum, Max Factor, Tiffany & Co., and Chopard.

== Business projects ==
In 2017, Eugenia started Eustyle, an online shop. That same year, she opened Palm Kids, a kid's model agency. Eugenia has also expanded her business portfolio to become a business partner in Braven Films.

== Personal life ==
Eugenia and her partner Alfonso de Borbón y Yordi (born 16 November 1973 in Madrid) have two sons, Alfonso (born 1 April 2014 in Madrid) and Jerónimo (born 14 June 2017 in Madrid). Alfonso is the elder child of Alfonso de Borbón y Escasany (1945–2025), who was the second son of Francisco de Borbón y Borbón and a member of the Spanish branch of the House of Bourbon.

She is an ambassador for Fundación Plan International, an NGO that works to improve the lives of children in 49 countries in Africa, Latin America and Asia.
