= Francisco de Paula de Borbón y Castellví =

Spanish nobleman (1853–1942)

Francisco de Borbón y Castellví
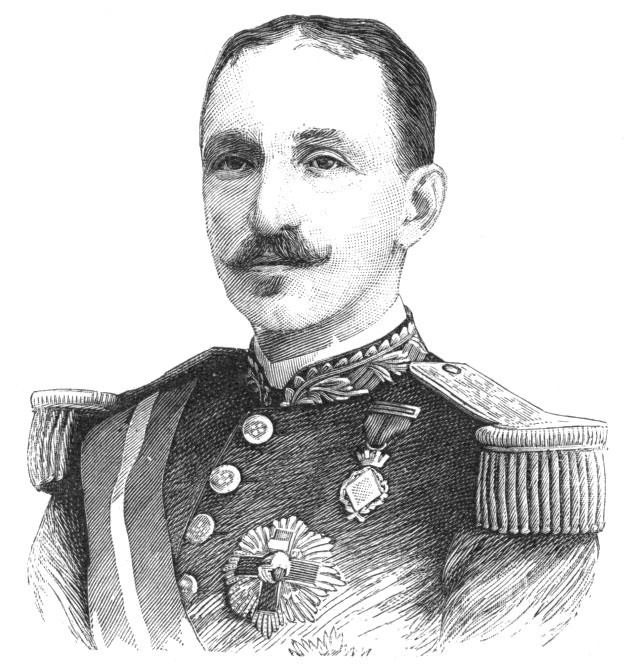
- Francisco in 1894
- Born: 29 March 1853; Toulouse, France
- Died: 28 March 1942 (aged 88); Madrid, Spain
- Family: Bourbon
- Spouses: Maria Luisa de la Torre y Bassave (m. 1877; died 1887) Felisa de León y Navarro de Balboa (m. 1890)
- Issue: 8, including Francisco
- Father: Infante Enrique of Spain
- Mother: Elena María de Castellví y Shelly

Francisco de Paula de Borbón y Castellví (Spanish: Don Francisco de Paula Maria Trinidad Enrique Gabriel Miguel Rafael Edmundo Buenaventura de Borbón y Castellví; 29 March 1853 – 28 March 1942) was a Spanish nobleman and military officer. He was a younger son of the controversial Infante Enrique of Spain, who was a grandson of Charles IV of Spain and younger brother of Francis, Duke of Cádiz, king consort of Isabella II of Spain. Despite his family ties, Francisco never had the title of Infante of Spain because his parents' marriage was unequal and did not receive approval from Queen Isabella II. That is also the reason why he was not recognised as a Carlist pretender.

== Early life and career ==
Francisco de Paula was born in Toulouse, France, the third child of Infante Enrique of Spain (son of Infante Francisco de Paula of Spain and Princess Luisa Carlotta of the Two Sicilies) and his morganatic wife, Elena María de Castellví y Shelly (1821–1863), daughter of Antonio de Castellví y Fernández de Córdoba, Count of Castellá, and Margarita Shelly y McCarthy. His mother was of Valencian and Irish ancestry. His parents had married secretly in Rome, as their union was not approved by Queen Isabella II. Once they returned to Spain, the couple was exiled to Bayonne, and they later settled in Toulouse. He had three brothers and one sister.

His early years were spent between Spain and France. On 12 March 1870, his father challenged Antoine, Duke of Montpensier, to a duel. The duel ended in the shooting and death of his father. His brother Enrique refused to accept the 30,000 pesetas that the Duke of Montepensier offered to pay as compensation for his act. He and his siblings were adopted by their uncle, Francisco de Asís.

Like his brothers, Francisco proved to have good military skills. Initially, he joined the Carlist army, but after the restoration of the monarchy, he joined the army of his cousin, Alfonso XII, in 1875. That year, he was appointed brigadier general in the island of Cuba, which at that time was still a colony of Spain.

Francisco de Paula was known at the time to claim for himself the erstwhile French throne, after the death in 1883 of the pretender Henri, Count of Chambord. His claim caused numerous headaches for the queen regent, Maria Christina, which resulted in two months of imprisonment for Francisco de Paula at Santoña in 1898. His cousin Alfonso XIII awarded him the Order of the Golden Fleece in 1927.

== Marriage and family ==
In Havana, he met his first wife, María Luisa de la Torre y Bassave (1856–1887), daughter of José Maria de la Torre y Armenteros, a wealthy Cuban landowner. They married in Havana on 15 September 1877 but settled in Madrid, where four of their five children were born.

They had five children:

- Elena de Borbón y de la Torre (18 September 1878 – 24 September 1936), married in 1908 to José de Oltra y Fullana, had issue. Killed during the Spanish Civil War.
- María Luisa de Borbón y de la Torre (27 March 1880 – 28 January 1968), married in 1904 to Diego González-Conde y García, Marquis de Villamantilla de Perales, had issue.
- Francisco de Paula de Borbón y de la Torre (16 January 1882 – 6 December 1952), married in 1907 to his first cousin Enriqueta de Borbón y Parade, 4th Duchess of Seville; their grandson Francisco de Borbón y Escasany is the current Duke of Seville.
- José María de Borbón y de la Torre (16 December 1883 – 28 October 1962), married in 1909 to Maria Luisa Rich y Carbajo, who was murdered by her husband in 1926. The case was silenced by the will of his cousin Alfonso XIII. They had issue.
- María de los Dolores de Borbón y de la Torre (25 May 1887 – 28 January 1985), died unmarried.

After the death of María Luisa in 1887, Francisco de Paula married secondly on 15 February 1890 in Madrid to Felisa de León y Navarro de Balboa, from a noble family and also a native of Cuba.

They had three children:

- Enrique María de Borbón y León (6 July 1891 – 29 October 1936), 3rd Marquis de Balboa, married in 1917 to Isabel de Esteban y Iranzo, Countess de Estaban, had issue. Killed during the Spanish Civil War.
- Alfonso María de Borbón y León (24 October 1893 – 29 October 1936), 2nd Marquis de Squilache, married in 1925 to María Luisa de Caralt y Mas, had issue. Killed during the Spanish Civil War.
- María de las Nieves Blanca de Borbón y León (26 August 1898 – 4 June 1989), married in 1929 to Luis de Figueroa y Alonso-Martinez, 2nd Count de Romanones, had issue.

== Later years ==
After the proclamation of the Second Spanish Republic, Francisco de Paula was able to stay in Spain, and he continued to reside in Madrid. However, after the outbreak of the Spanish Civil War, he had to seek asylum at the Embassy of Chile in Madrid. Several of his descendants had worse luck – his children Elena, Enrique and Alfonso, and grandchildren María Luisa González-Conde y de Borbon, José Luis de Borbon y Rich and Jaime de Borbón y Esteban, were shot by the Spanish Republican Army.

== Notes and sources ==
- thePeerage.com - Don Francisco de Paula de Borbón y de Castellvi
- The Royal House of Stuart, London, 1969, 1971, 1976, Addington, A. C., Reference: II 96
- Mateos Sáinz de Medrano, Ricardo. Nobleza Obliga. La Esfera de Los Libros, 2006. ISBN 84-9734-467-7.
