= Francisco de Borbón y de la Torre =

Spanish aristocrat (1882–1952)

- Duke of Seville (jure uxoris)
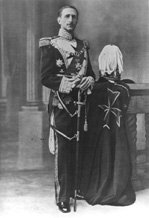
- Portrait as Grand Master of the Order of Saint Lazarus
- Born: 16 January 1882; Madrid, Spain
- Died: 6 December 1952 (aged 70); Madrid, Spain
- Family: Bourbon
- Spouse: Enriqueta de Borbón y Parade, 4th Duchess of Seville (m. 1907)
- Issue: Isabella de Borbón y Borbón; Enrique de Borbón y Borbón; Francisco de Borbón y Borbón
- Father: Francisco de Paula de Borbón y Castellví
- Mother: Maria Luisa de la Torre

Francisco de Borbón y de la Torre (Spanish: Francisco de Paula de Borbón y La Torre; 16 January 1882 – 6 December 1952) was a Spanish aristocrat, military officer (Captaincy General) and member of parliament in Spain. He was a cousin of King Alfonso XIII of Spain and was styled as Duke of Seville (jure uxoris) by virtue of his marriage in 1907 to the 4th Duchess of Seville. In 1935, he was authorised by King Alfonso XIII to accept the appointment as Grand Master of the Order of Saint Lazarus.

== Military career ==
Francisco de Borbón y de la Torre graduated from the Spanish Infantry Academy in 1896 and served as an officer in Spanish Morocco. Despite swearing loyalty to the new Spanish Republic, he was removed from the military in June 1931. He took part in the Spanish Civil War on the Nationalist side, loyal to Francisco Franco.

After the rising of July 18, 1936, he entered the Nationalist Army as an Infantry Colonel, commanding the 7th "Pavia" Infantry Regiment. On May 14, 1938, he was promoted to Brigadier General. He ended the war as commander of the Army Corps of Cordoba. He was subsequently promoted to Division General in 1941 and Lieutenant General in February 1946.

== Order of Saint Lazarus ==
Coat of arms as Grand Master of the Order of Saint Lazarus

Francisco de Borbón y de la Torre was appointed Lieutenant-General of the Order of Saint Lazarus in 1930. Subsequently, on 12 December 1935, he was authorised by his cousin King Alfonso XIII to accept the appointment as 44th Grand Master of the Order of Saint Lazarus, hence resurrecting the office that had been vacant since 1814 after the 43rd Grand Master, Louis Stanislas Xavier of France, became King Louis XVIII after the Bourbon Restoration.

The symbolic value of this appointment was limited, however, by the fact that the Spanish Republic itself dissolved the royal orders in 1933. The Order of Saint Lazarus in Spain was subsequently officially accepted by the Spanish Republican Government by decree dated 9 May 1940.

== Personal life ==
He was the elder son of Francisco de Paula de Borbón y Castellví (1853–1942) and his morganatic wife, María Luisa de la Torre y Bassave (1856–1887). On 21 August 1907, he married his cousin Enriqueta de Borbón y Parade, 4th Duchess of Seville (1885–1967), the youngest daughter of Enrique de Borbón y Castellví, 2nd Duke of Seville (1848–1894) and Joséphine Parade y Sibié (1840–1939).

From this marriage, three children were born:

- Isabel Francisca de Borbón y Borbón (1908–1974), married Rinaldo Barucci (1900–1956), with issue
- Enrique de Borbón y Borbón (1909–1915)
- Francisco de Paula de Borbón y Borbón (1912–1995), married firstly Enriqueta Escasany y Miquel (1925–1962), then secondly María de Lóbez y Salvador (1928–2002), with issue from both marriages

Francisco de Borbón y de la Torre died in Madrid on 6 December 1952.

== Orders, decorations and medals ==
- Grand Cross of the Royal and Military Order of Saint Hermenegild (30 July 1940)
- Grand Cross of the Military Order of Merit (Spain) (29 September 1943)
