= Infante Enrique, Duke of Seville =

Spanish infante (1823–1870)

Infante Enrique
- Duke of Seville
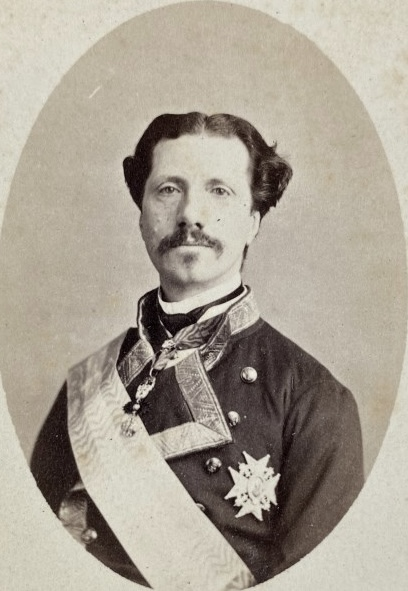
- Infante Enrique, c. 1860s
- Born: 17 April 1823; Seville, Kingdom of Spain
- Died: 12 March 1870 (aged 46); Madrid, Kingdom of Spain
- Burial: Saint Isidore Cemetery, Madrid
- Spouse: Elena María de Castellví y Shelly (m. 1847; died 1863)
- Issue: Enrique de Borbón y Castellví, 2nd Duke of Seville; Luis de Borbón y Castellví; Francisco de Paula de Borbón y Castellví; Alberto de Borbón y Castellví; María del Olvido de Borbón y Castellví
Names
- Spanish: Enrique María Fernando Carlos Francisco Luis
- House: Bourbon
- Father: Infante Francisco de Paula of Spain
- Mother: Princess Luisa Carlotta of the Two Sicilies

Infante Enrique, Duke of Seville (Note: Spanish: Infante Enrique María Fernando Carlos Francisco Luis de Borbón y Borbón-Dos Sicilias, Duque de Sevilla) (17 April 1823 – 12 March 1870), was an Infante of Spain and a member of the Spanish branch of the House of Bourbon. He was a grandson of Charles IV of Spain and became the first Duke of Seville in 1823. He was known for his progressive, even revolutionary, ideas during the reign of his double first cousin and sister-in-law, Isabella II of Spain.

== Early life ==
Infante Enrique was born in Seville, Spain, the fourth child and third son of Infante Francisco de Paula of Spain (1794–1865; son of Charles IV of Spain and Princess Maria Luisa of Parma) and his wife, Princess Luisa Carlotta of the Two Sicilies (1804–1844), who was the daughter of Francis I of the Two Sicilies and Infanta Maria Isabella of Spain.

Born in the Andalusian city of Seville, his uncle King Ferdinand VII granted him the title of Duke of Seville in 1823. Ferdinand VII had conferred the title of Duke of Cádiz on Infante Francisco de Paula's first son (Francisco de Asís) in 1820 and then, after the child's death the following year, on Infante Francisco de Paula's next son, Francis. Enrique was baptized with the name Enrique María Fernando Carlos Francisco Luís and his godparents were his maternal aunt, Princess Marie Caroline, Duchess of Berry, and her son, the Duke of Bordeaux, for whom he was named.

In 1833, the death of his uncle, King Ferdinand VII, divided the court between supporters of Queen Isabella II and their mutual uncle, Don Carlos. Enrique's aunt, Queen mother Maria Christina of the Two Sicilies, the widow of Ferdinand VII, served as regent of Spain on Isabella's behalf from 1833 to 1840.

The second marriage of Maria Christina with Agustín Fernando Muñoz y Sánchez in 1833 caused a disagreement between her and her sister, Infanta Luisa Carlotta, resulting in the banishment of Luisa Carlota and her family to Paris, where the queen consort of France, Maria Amalia of Naples and Sicily, was her aunt.

Enrique and his brothers were educated in the French capital. At the Lycée, he met his cousin Antoine, Duke of Montpensier, with whom he later developed an intense rivalry that would eventually end in tragedy. Enrique spent time in Belgium, where his cousin, Louise, was queen. There, he learned of the expulsion from Spain of Maria Christina and her husband in 1840.

Finally able to return to Spain, Enrique soon began his military career in Ferrol, Galicia, where he was praised for his excellent conduct. In 1843, he was promoted to lieutenant and was commander of the ship Manzanares. By 1845, he was captain of a frigate.

=== Exile ===
Although a possible marriage between Enrique and Isabella II was considered, she married Enrique's brother Francis, Duke of Cádiz, who was Enrique's elder, but whose effeminacy had been construed as rendering him an unlikely father and therefore a less suitable marital candidate. At the same time, the queen's younger sister, Infanta Luisa, was married to the Duke of Montpensier at the instigation of France.

Openly offended at these setbacks, and accused of taking part in a revolt against the monarchy in Galicia, Enrique was expelled from Spain in March 1846, shortly before the wedding of his brother and the Queen. Enrique took refuge in Belgium, where his sister Isabel Fernandina was staying. At that time, he was considered a candidate for the throne of Mexico, although there is little evidence that Enrique pursued that prospect.

== Marriage and family ==
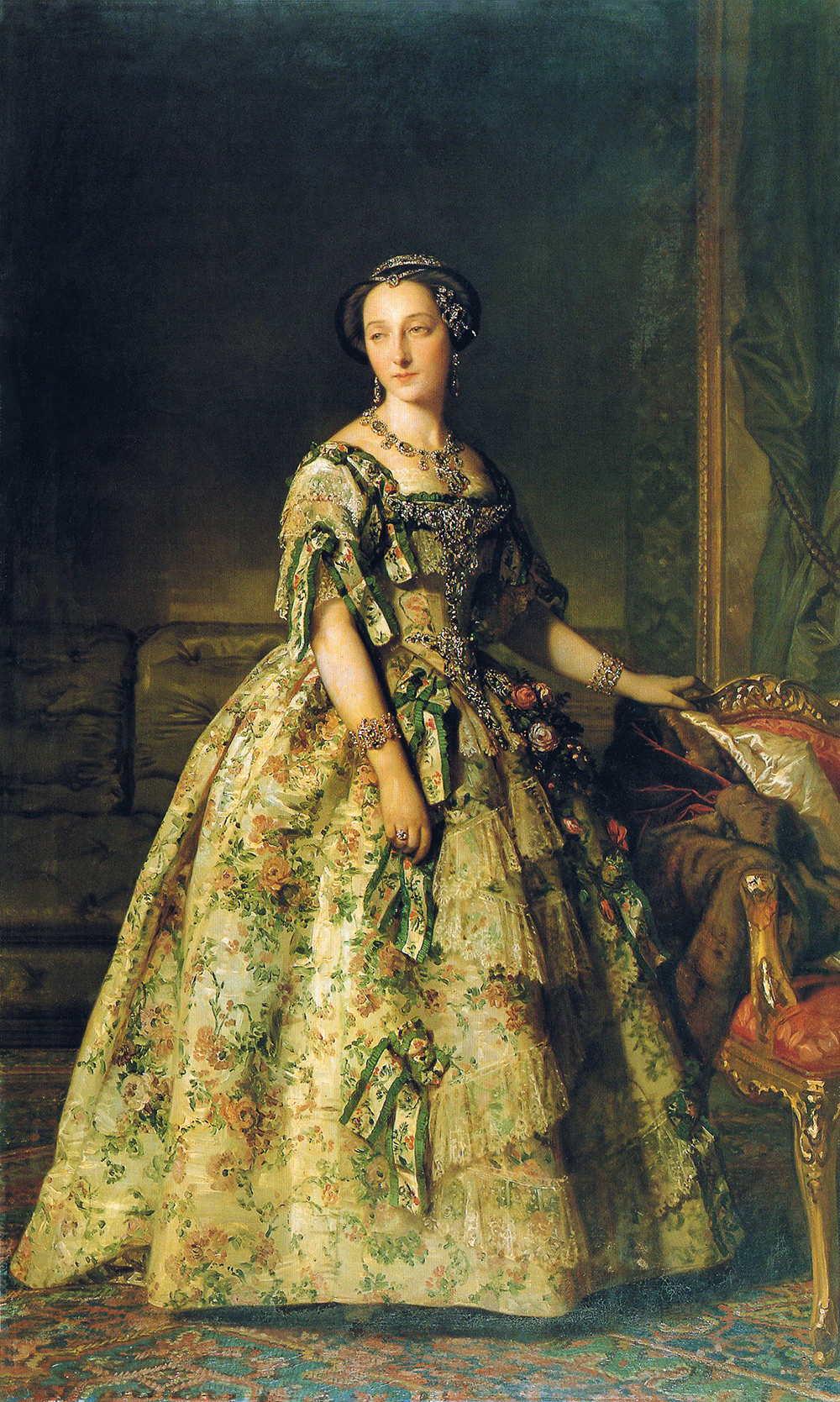
Elena María de Castellví y Shelly, Duchess of Seville, 1851

Shortly thereafter, Enrique was allowed to return to Spain, where he met Elena María de Castellví y Shelly (1821–1863), daughter of Antonio de Padua de Castellvi y Fernández de Córdoba, Count of Castellá, and his wife Margarita Shelly. The Queen did not support the mésalliance, thus the couple eloped to Rome on 6 May 1847. Upon the couple's return to Spain, they were banished to Bayonne, later settling in Toulouse.

They had four sons and one daughter:

- Enrique de Borbón y Castellví, 2nd Duke of Seville (3 October 1848 – 12 July 1894), who married Joséphine Parade in 1870, and had issue.
- Luis de Borbón y Castellví (7 November 1851 – 25 February 1854).
- Francisco de Paula de Borbón y Castellví (29 March 1853 – 28 March 1942), who married Maria Luisa de La Torre y Bassave in 1877, and had issue. He married secondly Felisa de León y Navarro de Balboa in 1890, and had further issue.
- Alberto de Borbón y Castellví, 1st Duke of Santa Elena (22 February 1854 – 21 January 1939), who married Marguerite d'Ast de Novelé in 1878, and had issue.
- María del Olvido de Borbón y Castellví (28 November 1863 – 14 April 1907), who married Cárlos Fernández-Maquieira y Oyanguren in 1888, and had issue.

== Return to Spain ==
While in France, Enrique several times proclaimed himself a revolutionary, and he was asked to join the International Workingmen's Association. He publicly became a freemason and attained the 33rd rank in the Masonic Scottish Rite.

On 13 May 1848, he was stripped of his royal rank and titles (his children, being born of a morganatic marriage, were untitled). In 1849, he asked the Queen's forgiveness in order to return from exile. The family settled in Valladolid in 1851 but were soon forced to return to France. In 1854, he returned to Spain and resided in Valencia, where his fourth son (Alberto) was born and where his second son (Luis) died shortly after Alberto's birth. Enrique's ducal title was restored, but not the title of Infante of Spain.

== Exile to France ==
Soon after, the Duke of Seville again expressed leftist ideas in 1860, and he went in exile to France once more. There, he obtained the rank of Captain General of the army, and three years later, he was promoted to Lieutenant General. In 1863, his wife died after giving birth to their fifth child. She was buried in the Convent of Las Descalzas Reales rather than in the Spanish royal tombs at El Escorial, which are reserved for queens and infantas of Spain.

== Death ==
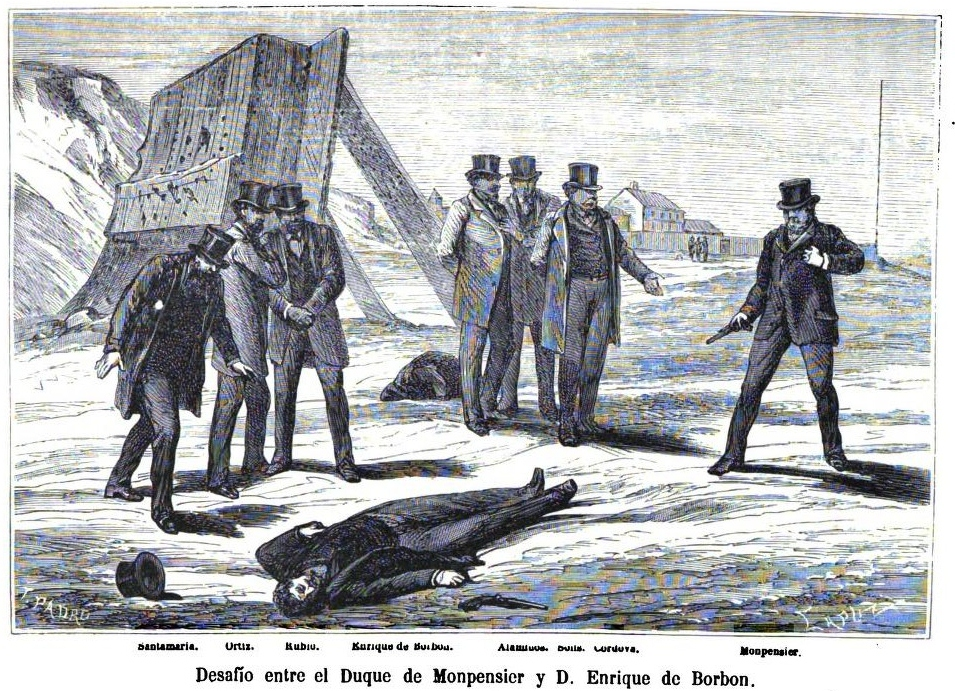
Engraving of the duel

Between 1869 and 1870, Enrique published several pamphlets and articles hostile to his cousin Antoine, Duke of Montpensier. He challenged Montpensier to a duel, which took place near La Fortuna in Leganés, Madrid, on 12 March 1870. Enrique was shot and killed, removing him as a public critic of the duke's alleged aspirations to the Spanish throne.

Enrique's eldest son refused to accept the 30,000 pesetas (Note: In the year 2021 value, it is at least $100,000.) that the Duke of Montpensier offered as compensation. Enrique, who was no longer an Infante of Spain, could not be buried in El Escorial, thus he was buried at the Saint Isidore Cemetery in Madrid.

Enrique's children were adopted by his brother, Francis.

== Arms ==
Heraldry of Enrique, Duke of Seville

Coat of arms of Enrique as Infante of Spain
and Duke of Seville
(Until 1848)

Coat of arms of Enrique as Duke of Seville
(1848–1870)

== Ancestry ==
Ancestors of Infante Enrique, Duke of Seville

8. Charles III of Spain
4. Charles IV of Spain (= 14)
9. Maria Amalia of Saxony
2. Infante Francisco de Paula of Spain
10. Philip, Duke of Parma
5. Maria Luisa of Parma (= 15)
11. Louise Élisabeth of France
1. Infante Enrique, Duke of Seville
12. Ferdinand I of the Two Sicilies
6. Francis I of the Two Sicilies
13. Maria Carolina of Austria
3. Princess Luisa Carlotta of Naples and Sicily
14. Charles IV of Spain (= 4)
7. Maria Isabella of Spain
15. Maria Luisa of Parma (= 5)

== Notes and sources ==
- Mateos Sáinz de Medrano, Ricardo. The Unknown Infant of Spain. Thassalia, 1996.
- Mateos Sáinz de Medrano, Ricardo. Nobleza Obliga. La Esfera de Los Libros, 2006. ISBN 84-9734-467-7.

Infante Enrique, Duke of Seville House of Bourbon Cadet branch of the Capetian dynasty Born: 17 April 1823 Died: 12 March 1870
Spanish nobility
New title	Duke of Seville; 1823–1870	Succeeded by Enrique de Borbón y Castellvi
