= Genealogiae scriptoris Fusniacensis =

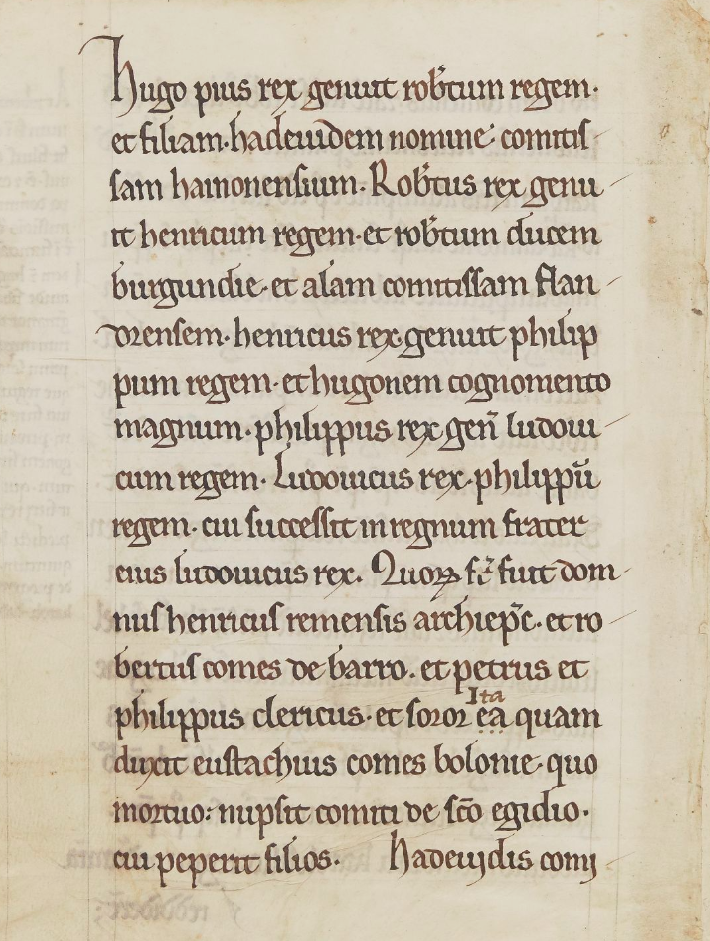
Hugh Capet's descendants, from the Genealogiae

Genealogiae scriptoris Fusniacensis (Note: Waitz's title, meaning "Genealogies written at Foigny") or Genealogia regum Francorum tertiae stirpis (Note: Brial's title, meaning "Genealogy of the kings of the Franks of the third lineage") is the conventional Latin title given to a collection of genealogies of the Capetian dynasty going back to 866. It is especially useful for the light it sheds on the noble families of Lotharingia. It was composed at the Abbey of Foigny in the diocese of Laon between 1160 and 1162, probably by the reigning abbot, Robert. Its twelve folios are now preserved as 1–12 in the Bibliothèque Nationale de France (MS 9376). It has been edited twice. Its second editor, Georg Waitz, divided it into twenty chapters.

== Editions ==
- Michel Jean Joseph Brial, ed. "Genealogia regum Francorum tertiae stirpis", Recueil des Historiens des Gaules et de la France (Paris: 1806), 1–10
- Georg Waitz, ed. "Genealogiae scriptoris Fusniacensis", Monumenta Germaniae Historica, Scriptores, 13 (Hanover: 1881), 251–56.
