= Enrique de Borbón y Castellví, 2nd Duke of Seville =

Spanish noble and military officer (1848–1894)

The Most Excellent The Duke of Seville Grandee of Spain
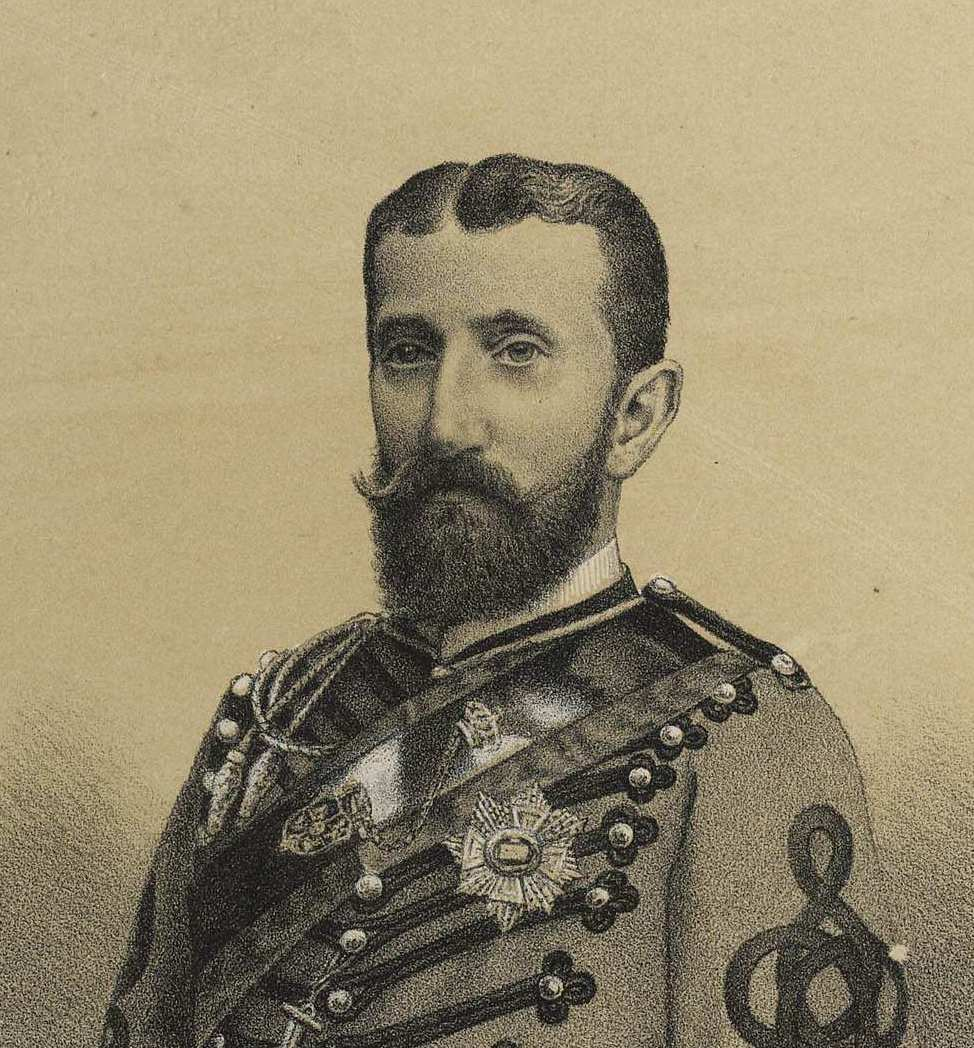
- Enrique in 1879

2nd Duke of Seville
- Tenure: 1870–1894
- Predecessor: Infante Enrique of Spain
- Successor: María Luisa de Borbón y Parade
- Born: 3 November 1848; Toulouse, France
- Died: 12 July 1894 (aged 45); Red Sea
- Family: Bourbon
- Spouse: Joséphine Parade (m. 1870)
- Issue: María Luisa de Borbón y Parade, 3rd Duchess of Seville; Marta de Borbón y Parade; Enriqueta de Borbón y Parade, 4th Duchess of Seville
- Parents: Infante Enrique of Spain; Elena María de Castellví y Shelly

Don Enrique de Borbón y Castellví, 2nd Duke of Seville (Spanish: Don Enrique Pio Maria Francisco de Paula Luis Antonio de Borbón y Castellví, Duque de Sevilla; 3 October 1848 – 12 July 1894), was a Spanish nobleman and military officer who became the second Duke of Seville. He was the eldest son of the controversial Infante Enrique of Spain, who was a grandson of Charles IV of Spain and younger brother of Francis, Duke of Cádiz, king consort of Isabella II of Spain. Despite his family ties, Enrique was never entitled Infante of Spain due to the unequal marriage of his parents, which did not receive approval from Queen Isabella II.

== Life and career ==
Enrique was born in Toulouse, France, the first child of Infante Enrique of Spain (son of Infante Francisco de Paula of Spain and Princess Luisa Carlotta of Naples and Sicily) and his morganatic wife, Elena María de Castellví y Shelly (1821–1863), daughter of Antonio de Padua de Castellví y Fernández de Córdoba, Count of Castellá, and Margarita Shelly. His mother was of Valencian and Irish ancestry. His parents had married secretly in Rome, as their union was not approved by Queen Isabella II. Once they returned to Spain, the couple was exiled to Bayonne, and they later settled in Toulouse. He had three brothers and one sister.

His early years were spent between Spain and France. On 12 March 1870, his father challenged Antoine, Duke of Montpensier, to a duel. The duel ended in the shooting and death of his father. Enrique refused to accept the 30,000 pesetas that the Duke of Montepensier offered to pay as compensation. He and his siblings were adopted by their uncle, Francis.

Like his brothers, Enrique proved to have good military skills. Initially, they joined the Carlist army, but after the restoration of the monarchy, he joined the army of his cousin, Alfonso XII.

Enrique, also a friend of Alfonso XII, did not always maintain a good relationship with the latter's widow, Queen Maria Christina, for opposing the appointment of Maria Christina as Regent of Spain. For his attitude, he was imprisoned and deprived of his rank, but he managed to escape to Marseille and thereafter refused to return to Madrid.

Years later, he was rehabilitated and able to return to Spain, but uncomfortable with his position at court, he was sent to the Spanish East Indies (now the Philippines, then a Spanish colony) as governor of Tayabas Province.

== Marriage and family ==
During the exile of his family, he met Joséphine Parade (1840–1939), daughter of Jean Parade and Geneviève Sibié. They married in San Fernando de Jarama (now San Fernando de Henares) on 5 November 1870.

They had three daughters:

- María Luisa de Borbón y Parade (4 April 1868 – 10 June 1949) was the 3rd Duchess of Seville. Born two years before her parents' marriage, she always experienced the stigma of illegitimacy. Her mother asked, after the death of Enrique, for the exclusion of María Luisa from the succession to the dukedom. She married in London in 1894 with a Catalan, Juan Monclus y Cabanellas, and returned to Spain. Under pressure, she ceded the ducal title in 1919 to her youngest sister, Enriqueta. She had no issue.
- Marta de Borbón y Parade (3 May 1880 – 19 March 1928) died unmarried and without issue, but it is said that a marriage was suggested between her and a prince of the House of Orléans, which her father despised. He strongly opposed the union because the Duke of Montpensier had killed his father during a duel in 1870.
- Enriqueta de Borbón y Parade (28 June 1885 – 28 October 1967) was the 4th Duchess of Seville. In 1907, she married her first cousin, Francisco de Borbón y de la Torre. Enriqueta and Francisco were the parents of Francisco de Borbón y Borbón. Their grandson, Francisco de Borbón y Escasany, succeeded her as the 5th Duke of Seville in 1968.

== Death ==
Enrique died in 1894 aboard the steamer Montevideo on the Red Sea as a result of an illness contracted in the colonies, while returning to Spain.

== Notes and sources ==
- The Royal House of Stuart, London, 1969, 1971, 1976, Addington, A. C., Reference: II 95
- Mateos Sáinz de Medrano, Ricardo. Nobleza Obliga. La Esfera de Los Libros, 2006. ISBN 84-9734-467-7.

Spanish nobility
Preceded by Infante Enrique of Spain	Duke of Seville; 1870–1894	Succeeded by María Luisa de Borbón y Parade
