= King of the Indies =

King of the Indies (Rex Indiarum) was a title used by the monarchs of Spain to reflect their sovereignty in large parts of the Americas (called "Indies" at their discovery).

Isabella of Castile was the first to use it as she became queen of the West Indies following the Voyages of Christopher Columbus. As her successor Charles I, better known as Charles V, Holy Roman Emperor, inherited the crown of Castile and ratified the conquest of the Aztecs and Incas by the conquistadores from the 1520s onward, the title of "King of the Indies" was favored over "King of the West Indies" to reflect the growing expansion from the West Indies into the mainland. Charles V also ratified the establishment of Klein-Venedig and appointed figures such as Mercurino Gattinara as "Grand Chancellors of the Indies".

The title of "King of the Indies" was inherited by Philip II of Spain who also styled himself as "King of the Western and Eastern Indies". Under Philip II, the term "West Indies" came to include both the insular territories and the Spanish Main in order to distinguish these possessions from the new colony of the Spanish East Indies (the Philippines, Micronesia, Taiwan). The term "King of the Indies" continued to be used by Spanish monarchs in the 17th and 18th century. Nowadays, West Indies only refer to the original area of the Spanish West Indies and the term "Indies" refers to the East Indies.

== See also ==
- Council of the Indies
