= Duke of Seville =

Title in the Peerage of Spain

- Creation date: 23 April 1823
- Created by: Ferdinand VII
- First holder: Infante Enrique
- Last holder: Francisco de Borbón, 5th Duke of Seville
- Remainder to: heirs of the body of the grantee according to absolute primogeniture
- Status: Vacant

Arms of the 5th Duke of Seville as Grand Master of the Order of Saint Lazarus

Duke of Seville (Spanish: Duque de Sevilla) is a hereditary title of Spanish nobility, accompanied by the dignity of Grandee. It was granted on 23 April 1823 by King Ferdinand VII to his nephew, Infante Enrique. The dukes of Seville are members of the Spanish branch of the House of Bourbon.

The title is vacant since the death of Don Francisco de Borbón, its last holder.

== List of holders of the title ==
	Holder of Title	Period	Spouse
Created by King Ferdinand VII of Spain
I	Infante Enrique of Spain b. 17 April 1823, d. 12 March 1870	23 April 1823 – 12 March 1870	Elena Maria de Castellvi y Shelly b. 16 Oct 1821, d. 29 Dec 1863, consort 6 May 1847 - 29 Dec 1863.
II	Enrique de Borbón y Castellví, 2nd Duke of Seville b. 3 Oct 1848, d. 12 Jul 1894	1 July 1882 – 12 Jul 1894	Joséphine Parade b. 12 April 1840, d. 20 Oct 1939, consort 1 July 1882 - 12 Jul 1894.
III	María Luisa de Borbón y Parade, 3rd Duchess of Seville b. 4 April 1868, d. 10 June 1949	15 Jul 1895 – 2 Jul 1919	Juan Lorenzo Francisco de Monclús y Cabanellas b. 9 Aug 1862, d. 13 Dec 1918, consort 15 Jul 1895 - 13 Dec 1918.
IV	Enriqueta de Borbón y Parade, 4th Duchess of Seville b. 28 Jun 1885/1888, d. 28 Oct 1967	2 Jul 1919 – 28 Oct 1967	Francisco de Borbón y de la Torre b. 16 Jan 1882, d. 6 Dec 1952, consort 2 Jul 1919 - 6 Dec 1952.
V	Francisco de Borbón y Escasany, 5th Duke of Seville b. 16 Nov 1943, d. 20 May 2025	22 Oct 1968 – 20 May 2025	1. Countess Beatrice Wilhelmine Paula von Hardenberg; b. 28 Jun 1947, d. 14 Mar 2020, consort 7 Jul 1973 - 30 Jun 1989 (divorced).: 2. Isabelle Karanitsch; b. 23 Nov 1959, consort 19 Oct 1991 - 17 Jun 1993 (divorced).: 3. María de los Ángeles de Vargas-Zúñiga y Juanes; b. 19 Nov 1954, consort 2 Sep 2000 - 20 May 2025.

== Line of succession ==
- Infante Enrique, 1st Duke of Seville (from 1823 to 1870)
  - Enrique, 2nd Duke of Seville (from 1882 to 1894)
    - María Luisa, 3rd Duchess of Seville (from 1895 to 1919)
    - Enriqueta, 4th Duchess of Seville (from 1919 to 1967)
      - Francisco (renounced his succession in 1968)
        - Francisco, 5th Duke of Seville (from 1968 to 2025)
          - (1) Olivia (born 1974, heir apparent)
            - (2) Flavia (born 2016)
            - (3) Fernando (born 2018)
          - (4) Francisco (born 1979)
            - (5) Francisco (born 2017)
        - Alfonso (1945-2025)
          - (6) Alfonso (born 1973)
            - (7) Alfonso (born 2014)
            - (8) Jerónimo (born 2017)
          - (9) Alejandra (born 1976)
            - (10) Tristan (born 2011)
            - (11) Santiago (born 2011)
        - (12) Enrique (born 1970)
      - Isabel (1908-1974)
        - Francisco de Borbón y Barucci (1936-2001)
          - (13) Sofia Isabel de Borbón-Barucci y Mateos (born 1966)
          - (14) Alfonso Rinaldo de Borbón-Barucci y Mateos (born 1967)
            - (15) Ignacio de Borbón (born 2001)
            - (16) Noa de Borbón (born 2012)
          - (17) Francisco de Borja de Borbón-Barucci y Mateos (born 1971)
        - Elena de Borbón y Barucci (1947-2015)
          - (18) Elena Coll y de Borbón-Barucci
          - (19) Francesca Coll y de Borbón-Barucci
            - (20) Micaela de la Mata y Coll
          - (21) Carla Garrigues y de Borbón-Barucci
            - (22) Juan Amil y Garrigues
            - (23) Clara Amil y Garrigues
          - (24) Flavia Garrigues y de Borbón-Barucci
          - (25) Olivia Garrigues y de Borbón-Barucci
        - (26) José Luis de Borbón y Barucci (born 1948)

== Sources ==
- Juan Martina Torres, The History of Spanish Nobility, 1500–present (Madrid 2009), for the: Universidad Complutense de Madrid (UCM) (translated title)
