= House of Bourbon-Anjou =

Reigning house of the Kingdom of Spain

- Arms of the House of Bourbon-Anjou
- Parent house: Bourbon
- Country: Spain
- Founded: 16 November 1700; 326 years ago
- Founder: Felipe V
- Current head: Felipe VI
- Members: Spanish royal family
- Cadet branches: House of Bourbon-Braganza (extinct); House of Bourbon-Parma; Grand ducal family of Luxembourg; House of Bourbon-Two Sicilies

The House of Bourbon-Anjou, generally known as the House of Bourbon (Spanish: Casa de Borbón), is the reigning house of the Kingdom of Spain. It is the Spanish branch of the French-Navarrese House of Bourbon. The house was founded on 16 November 1700, when Felipe (Philippe), Duke of Anjou, great-nephew of Carlos II, formally accepted the Crown. It created various cadet branches that held the throne of Parma, Naples and Sicily and the current Spanish royal family is descended from this dynasty.

This royal family has reigned in Spain from 1700 to the present, with interruptions during the French invasion (1808–1813), Sexenio Democrático (1868–1874), Second Republic (1931–1939) and dictatorship of Francisco Franco (1939–1975). There have been eleven Spanish monarchs of the House of Bourbon-Anjou; the first was Felipe V and the current one, Felipe VI.

== List of monarchs ==
Portrait	Name	Reign	Birth	Death	Consort	Claim
	Felipe V	16 November 1700 – 14 January 1724 (23 years, 59 days)	19 December 1683; Versailles	9 July 1746; Madrid (62 years, 202 days)	(1) Maria Luisa Gabriella of Savoy (2) Elisabeth Farnese	Great-nephew of Carlos II
	Felipe V	6 September 1724 – 9 July 1746 (21 years, 306 days)	19 December 1683; Versailles	9 July 1746; Madrid (62 years, 202 days)	(1) Maria Luisa Gabriella of Savoy (2) Elisabeth Farnese	Father of Luis I
	Luis I	14 January 1724 – 31 August 1724 (230 days)	25 August 1707; Madrid	31 August 1724; Madrid (17 years, 6 days)	Louise Élisabeth d'Orléans	Son of Felipe V and Maria Luisa Gabriella of Savoy
	Fernando VI	9 July 1746 – 10 August 1759 (13 years, 32 days)	23 September 1713; Madrid	10 August 1759; Villaviciosa de Odón (45 years, 321 days)	Barbara of Portugal	Son of Felipe V and Maria Luisa Gabriella of Savoy
	Carlos III	10 August 1759 – 14 December 1788 (29 years, 126 days)	20 January 1716; Madrid	14 December 1788; Madrid (72 years, 329 days)	Maria Amalia of Saxony	Son of Felipe V and Elisabeth Farnese
	Carlos IV	14 December 1788 – 19 March 1808 (19 years, 96 days)	11 November 1748; Portici	19 January 1819; Naples (70 years, 69 days)	Maria Luisa of Parma	Son of Carlos III and Maria Amalia of Saxony
	Fernando VII	19 March 1808 – 6 May 1808 (48 days)	14 October 1784; San Lorenzo de El Escorial	29 September 1833; Madrid (48 years, 350 days)	(1) Maria Antonia of Naples and Sicily (2) Maria Isabel of Braganza (3) Maria Josepha Amalia of Saxony (4) Maria Christina of the Two Sicilies	Son of Carlos IV and Maria Luisa of Parma
	Fernando VII	11 August 1808 / 11 December 1813 – 29 September 1833 (25 years, 49 days) / (19 years, 292 days)	14 October 1784; San Lorenzo de El Escorial	29 September 1833; Madrid (48 years, 350 days)	(1) Maria Antonia of Naples and Sicily (2) Maria Isabel of Braganza (3) Maria Josepha Amalia of Saxony (4) Maria Christina of the Two Sicilies	Son of Carlos IV and Maria Luisa of Parma
	Isabel II	29 September 1833 – 30 September 1868 (35 years, 1 day)	10 October 1830; Madrid	9 April 1904; Paris (73 years, 182 days)	Francisco de Asís de Borbón	Daughter of Fernando VII and Maria Christina of the Two Sicilies
	Alfonso XII	29 December 1874 – 25 November 1885 (10 years, 331 days)	28 November 1857; Madrid	25 November 1885; Paris (27 years, 362 days)	(1) Mercedes of Orléans (2) Maria Christina of Austria	Son of Isabel II and Francisco de Asís de Borbón
	Alfonso XIII	17 May 1886 – 14 April 1931 (44 years, 332 days)	17 May 1886; Madrid	28 February 1941; Rome (54 years, 287 days)	Victoria Eugenie of Battenberg	Son of Alfonso XII and Maria Christina of Austria
	Juan Carlos I	22 November 1975 – 19 June 2014 (38 years, 209 days)	5 January 1938; Rome	Living (88 years, 319 days)	Sofía of Greece and Denmark	Grandson of Alfonso XIII and Victoria Eugenie of Battenberg
	Felipe VI	19 June 2014 – present (12 years, 154 days)	30 January 1968; Madrid	Living (58 years, 294 days)	Letizia Ortiz Rocasolano	Son of Juan Carlos I and Sofía of Greece and Denmark

- NOTE: Juan (III) de Borbón (Pretender 1941-1977)

== Family tree ==
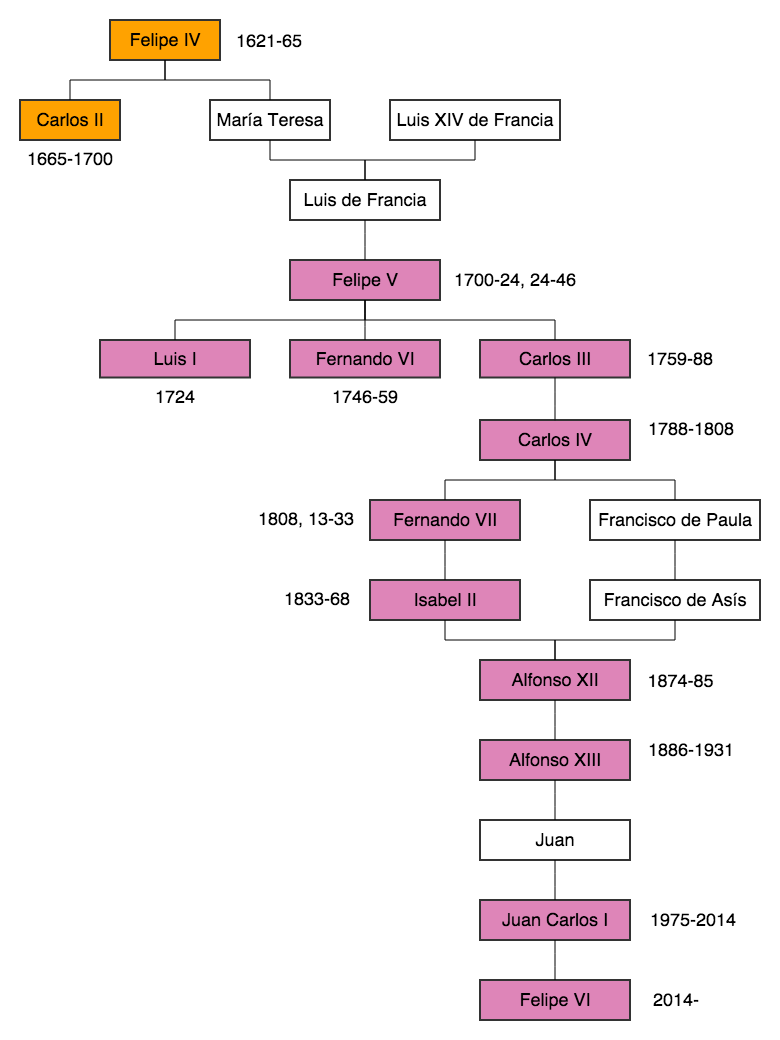
Family tree of the Spanish kings of the House of Bourbon-Anjou (in pink). Includes the last Habsburgs (in orange) and their kinship with the Bourbons, through Maria Theresa of Spain.
