= Hardenberg (surname) =

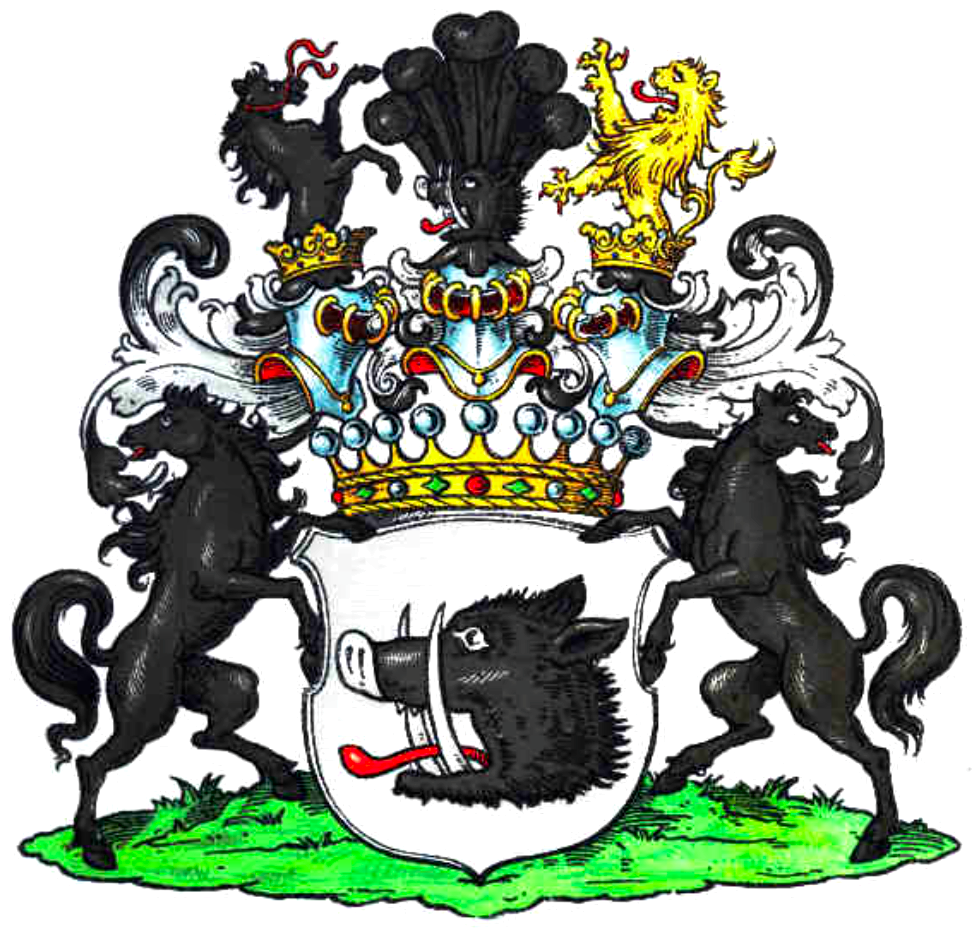
Arms of the Counts of Hardenberg

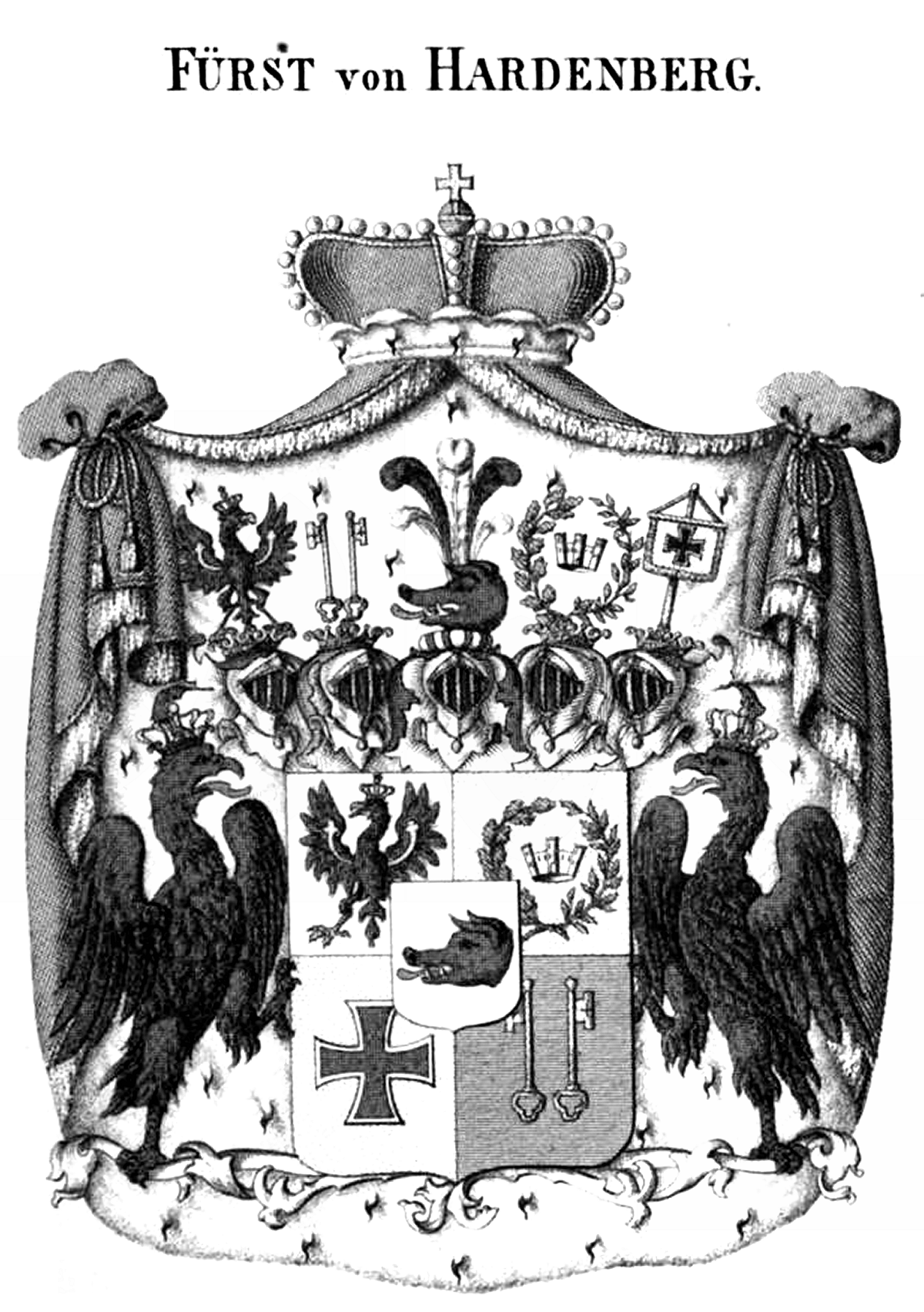
Coat of arms of the Prince of Hardenberg

The House of Hardenberg is an old German noble family of the Princes, Counts and Barons von Hardenberg or their Danish branch (see the German Wikipedia article Hardenberg family) with their ancestral seat at Nörten-Hardenberg since 1287 to this day.

== Surname ==
Hardenberg and von Hardenberg are German surnames, originally given to people from various places called Hardenberg.

== Notable people ==
- Albert Hardenberg (c. 1510–1574), Reformed theologian, born near Hardenberg, Overijssel
- Anne Hardenberg (died 1588), Danish noblewoman
- Astrid Gräfin von Hardenberg (1925–2015), daughter of Carl-Hans Graf von Hardenberg
- Beatrice von Hardenberg (1947–2020), German magazine editor
- Carl-Hans Graf von Hardenberg (1891–1958), German politician
- Francisco de Borbón von Hardenberg (born 1979), Spanish aristocrat and businessman
- Georg Philipp Friedrich Freiherr von Hardenberg (1772–1801), German poet known as Novalis
- Henriette Hardenberg (1894–1993), German Expressionist poet
- Prince Karl August von Hardenberg (1750–1822), Prussian statesman
- Lucie von Hardenberg (1776–1854), German architect
- Mette Hardenberg (1569–1629), Danish noble and landowner
- Olivia de Borbón von Hardenberg (born 1974), Spanish aristocrat
- Tita von Hardenberg (born 1968), stage name of German television journalist Katharina Isabel Gräfin von Hardenberg

== See also ==
- Hardenberg (disambiguation)
- Hardenbergh
- Hardenburg (disambiguation)
