= Secret Princes =

- Genre: Reality
- Country of origin: United States
- Original language: English
- No. of seasons: 2
- No. of episodes: 12

Production
- Executive producers: Mary Pelloni; Andrew O'Connor; Nick Parnes
- Production companies: Objective Productions (Seasons 1-2); Kalel Productions (Seasons 1-2)

Original release
- Network: TLC
- Release: September 21, 2012 – December 8, 2013

Secret Princes is an American reality television series that premiered on TLC on September 21, 2012. It chronicles the adventures of several members of international nobility as they leave their home countries to live, work and look for love in America. In addition, to guarantee that they are loved for their true selves and not for their wealth or status, they go undercover as ordinary locals in Atlanta, Georgia during the first season and in Austin, Texas during the second season. Season 2 premiered on TLC on October 25, 2013.

== Background ==
Production crews follow participants as they embark on a journey to achieve their romance while embracing American culture in the United States. During their pursuit of love, they are forced to leave their servants behind and learn to cook, clean and shop for themselves. They accomplish this by taking menial jobs such as busboys, waiters and dog groomers while struggling to adapt to the American working culture. They take these measures in order to fit in and find the perfect woman for each of them.

== Cast ==
=== Season 1 ===
- Francisco de Borbón y Hardenberg (b. 1979). Resides in Madrid, Spain. Direct male-line descendant of Spanish and French royalty of the House of Bourbon. He is the only son of the 5th Duke of Seville, who is a Grandee of Spain and a relative of the Spanish royal family. Francisco's ancestor, the 1st Duke of Seville, was the grandson of King Charles IV of Spain, who descended from King Louis XIV of France. Francisco's mother was Countess Beatrice von Hardenberg (1947–2020). She was the daughter of Princess Maria Josepha of Fürstenberg and Count Günther von Hardenberg {de}, whose family tree includes Prince Karl August von Hardenberg, a prime minister of Prussia. Francisco attended The American School of Madrid and then Barry University in Miami Shores, Florida, where he studied business and sports management. Francisco is an entrepreneur who travels frequently. He is involved with ASAP Group S.L., a company that specializes in sports marketing and media projects, with offices in Madrid and Miami. Francisco is an animal lover and has a dog named Snifferson. In this television series, Francisco used the undercover name "Cisco". He met a single mother named Camille Morone. They went to the zoo and had a romantic picnic before he decided to invite her to the ball and reveal his pedigree. She joined him in Spain, where she met his mother. The couple decided that they wanted to see each other again.
- Salauddin Babi of Balasinor (b. 1979). Resides in Gujarat, India. He is the only son of Muhammad Salabat Khan, the current Nawab of the former princely state of Balasinor in India. Salauddin has the title of Nawabzada of Balasinor, and he was educated at the Rajkumar College, Rajkot. His family's home is the Garden Palace in Balasinor, which was built in 1883 and contains around 70 rooms. In this television series, Salauddin used the undercover name "Sal". He chose a lawyer named Alison Langley and took her to India after disclosing his identity, but she decided not to continue their relationship. His parents have begun the arranged marriage process.
- Robert Jonathan Walters, Lord of the manor of Fullwood (b. 1982). Resides in London, England. He is routinely described as 'Lord Robert Walters' throughout the series, which is incorrect. He claims the title of Lord of the manor of Fullwood as an inheritance from his uncle. Robert had a strong interest in acting and entertainment from an early age. He attended a drama school in London, which led to leading roles in amateur theatrical productions. He was scouted by a British modelling agency and began an extensive modelling career. This later led him into television presenting, and he has appeared on a number of television shows. In this television series, Robert used the undercover name "Tate". He met Jasmine Bishop, a pharmaceutical sales rep, early on. They bonded over Shakespeare and swimming together with whale sharks at the Georgia Aquarium. He also met a dolphin trainer named Molly and went on two dates with her. He chose to reveal his true identity to Jasmine and invited her to his family's villa in Marbella, Spain, where she met his step-brother. In the end, he asked Jasmine to extend her stay in Europe. He said that because of Jasmine, he had even more of a reason to move to America and couldn't wait to visit her home and family in Andalusia, Alabama. The couple decided to continue their relationship, but they later broke up. In Season 2 of this television series, Robert appears in several episodes.
- The Honourable Ludovic Watson (b. 1989). Resides in Yorkshire, England. His father is the Right Honourable Miles Watson, 4th Baron Manton in the Peerage of the United Kingdom. However, Ludovic has an older brother named Thomas who is the heir apparent and is most likely to become the next Lord Manton. One of the family's ancestors is Sir Marmaduke Langdale, 1st Baron Langdale of Holme, who was a prominent Royalist military commander during the English Civil War. Ludovic lives at his family's country house, Houghton Hall, Yorkshire, which dates back to the 1760s. It is set in an estate of thousands of acres and was once the seat of the (now extinct) Barony of Langdale. He attended the prestigious Oundle School, which was founded in 1556, and he enjoys hunting, shooting, fishing and skiing. In this television series, Ludovic used the undercover name "Waldo". He met Melissa Braden at a nail salon and decided to disclose his pedigree to her at the ball. She visited him in England, where she did not get along with his aristocratic friends. Melissa told him that they were not a match, and they did not continue their relationship.

=== Season 2 ===
- Francis Alexander Mathew (b. 20 Sep. 1979). Resides in England. Direct descendant (through his mother) of the Russian imperial House of Romanov. He is the son of Thomas Mathew and Princess Olga Andreevna Romanoff. She is the daughter of the late Prince Andrei Alexandrovich of Russia, who was the grandson of Tsar Alexander III and the eldest nephew of the last Tsar, Nicholas II. Known professionally as Francis Mathew, he is a freelance professional photographer and has contributed to a number of magazines worldwide. He travels a lot and has worked on photo assignments in such places as Cameroon, India and Russia. His mother lives at Provender House, which was built starting in 1342 and is located in Kent, England. He is an active outdoorsman and enjoys keeping fit, rock climbing and reading. In this television series, he initially uses the name "Clint" as his undercover name, then later uses the name "Tom".
- Lorenzo Maria Raimondo de' Medici in Campitelli di Calabria (b. 1975). Resides in Rome, Italy. He claims descent from the House of Medici and originally comes from the town of Martirano in the south of Italy. He is the son of Alessandro de' Medici and his wife Krystyna, who live in Calabria, Italy. The main ruling Medici family died out in the 15th century, shortly after the death of Lorenzo the Magnificent. Lorenzo enjoys cooking and speaks several languages. His interests include the arts, charity work and family causes. Lorenzo spends his time working with several charities and is interested in pursuing a political career. In this television series, he uses the names "Dean" and "Dino" as his undercover names.
- The Right Honourable James Rodd, Lord Rennell (b. 1978). Resides in London, England. He is the 4th Baron Rennell in the Peerage of the United Kingdom. He inherited this title in 2006 from his late father, the 3rd Baron Rennell, who was a notable rugby player and later a businessman and politician. The current Lord Rennell grew up in London and attended a boarding school. He is a marketing expert who works for an event planning company. He has travelled extensively and enjoys playing tennis, squash, skiing and surfing. In this television series, he uses the name "Sam" as his undercover name.
- The Honourable Oliver Plunkett (b. 1985). Resides in County Meath, Ireland. He is the second son of the 20th Baron of Dunsany (1939–2011), a title in the Peerage of Ireland, and great-grandson of the 18th Baron of Dunsany (1878–1957), the famous writer. Oliver is the heir presumptive of his elder brother, the 21st Baron of Dunsany, who is the current Baron of Dunsany and a film director and producer. Oliver lives at his family's ancient castle in County Meath in Ireland, Dunsany Castle and Demesne, which is more than 800 years old. He is named after Saint Oliver Plunkett, who was a 17th-century Archbishop of Armagh. Oliver is a computer game designer and runs a company called Dunsany Interactive. He has a dog named Commander Chow and enjoys playing croquet, video games and skiing. In this television series, he uses the name "Luke" as his undercover name.

== Episodes ==
=== Season 1 (2012) ===
No. overall	No. in season	Title	Original release date	U.S. viewers (millions)
1	1	"Romancing the Throne"	September 21, 2012	1.22
The inaugural episode introduces the eligible bachelors and provides details about their prestigious backgrounds. After they arrive in Atlanta, the four aristocrats settle into their home and begin their quest to find true love. In order to adapt to their new surroundings, they start by choosing undercover names and adopting a more plebeian wardrobe in order to conceal their illustrious pedigrees and fit in with the local citizens.
2	2	"The Princely Paupers"	September 28, 2012	0.93
The four gentlemen go out in Atlanta and start searching for suitable ladies, but the task of getting dates is not as easy as they thought it would be. At their house, the guys host an American-style barbecue party. In order to earn some much-needed cash, they take on minimum-wage jobs, such as dog grooming. However, their privileged upbringing left the men ill-prepared to perform such menial work, and most of them do not last long in these jobs.
3	3	"The Glass Slipper"	October 5, 2012	1.01
The men continue dating in Atlanta, and they start to have some success at finding ladies of interest to them. One woman manages to capture the attention of two of the guys. However, it becomes increasingly difficult for the men to keep their undercover identities intact.
4	4	"The Royal Invitation"	October 12, 2012	1.38
As the odyssey in Atlanta draws to a close, each man must decide which lady he wants to bring back to his homeland. The guys must first prepare to reveal their true identities, and they are very nervous about that. The men finally make their choices and invite their American ladies to an upcoming Southern ball, where they will disclose their real names and find out the reaction.
5	5	"Happily Ever After?"	October 19, 2012	1.85
Each gentleman brings his chosen lady to the formal ball and later discloses his true identity, leaving the women surprised and overwhelmed. Upon reflection, the ladies accept the invitation to be a part of the men's regular lives, without being disappointed or angry about the men's decision to hide their aristocratic pedigrees. The women travel overseas to continue the relationships, but only two of the guys are ultimately successful in their endeavour.: Francisco and Camille: before the ball starts, she indicates that he is very attractive and treats her exceptionally well, and she later accepts his invitation to Spain; after her visit to Madrid, he tells Camille that he wants to see her again and that he hopes their relationship works, which she agrees with. He expressed an interest in moving to Atlanta to be closer to her.; Salauddin and Alison: after meeting his family in India, and he admits that he is falling in love with her, she tells him that she doesn't want to continue in a relationship where she doesn't feel there is a good fit as anything other than a friendship. She struggles with tears and tells the interviewer that she still cares about him.; Robert and Jasmine: he doesn't take her to his home in the U.K., because Jasmine's dream is to go to Spain, so he takes her to visit his family's Spanish holiday villa; he asks her to continue dating him and to stay for a few more days, and she accepts his invitation.; Ludovic and Melissa: after visiting him in England, they start out on a positive note with a picnic and shooting skeet, where she gets along well with his father. She then has dinner with his former classmates who ask her probing questions about her financial background and whether her breasts were real. She tells him she didn't like the way his friends treated her and is disappointed with his lack of motivation or ambition. He tries to convince her otherwise, but resolves to see her off.

=== Season 2 (2013) ===
No. overall	No. in season	Title	Original release date	U.S. viewers (millions)
6	1	"To Convince a Prince"	October 25, 2013	0.93
After the four gentlemen are introduced, they try to figure out how to pass themselves off as locals. Each aristocrat comes up with an American-sounding first name, then they ditch their custom-made clothing for their idea of American fashion. They go to a honky-tonk bar and meet a group of women, who comment on how badly the guys are dressed. Lorenzo dances with one woman, while Oliver hops on a mechanical bull with a different girl. The men's efforts to be more "American" lead them to a thrift shop, which Lorenzo finds beneath him until a stranger gives him $3 to help pay for his purchase when he finds himself short of money. A stunned Lorenzo comments that this act of kindness shows that Americans are the most generous people in the world.
7	2	"Rodeo & Juliet"	November 1, 2013	TBA
The eligible bachelors try different tactics to meet suitable ladies, including attending a rodeo, but things do not proceed as smoothly as they hope. Some of the men's dating experiences are disastrous, but Oliver has more luck. He meets a woman named Deena at a poetry event and gets along with her right away. On the home front, the guys are increasingly dismayed by the poor condition of their house. It is dirty and run down, has frequent power failures, and the lack of running water is very demoralizing to the men, who are not used to such rustic living arrangements.
8	3	"Disguise & Dolls"	November 8, 2013	TBA
The gentlemen can no longer tolerate the squalid living conditions at their shabby house, so they start looking for alternate accommodation. The guys eventually find another house that is a little cleaner and more comfortable, and they host a pool party at their new home to celebrate. Subsequently, a mysterious stranger who appears at the front door reveals himself to be Robert Walters from the first season of this series. Robert has come to assist the men undercover, and he offers good advice to help them fit in and look for love in Texas.
9	4	"Princess Charming"	November 15, 2013	TBA
Oliver and Deena are spending a lot of time together and beginning to grow closer, while James is getting on very well with Kitty, who has pink hair. By contrast, Lorenzo and Alexander are having a difficult time in trying to find the right ladies for them, and they are becoming increasingly discouraged.
10	5	"Smells Like a Prince"	November 24, 2013	TBA
Alexander had met Alaura at an art class, and he wants to go out with her. However, he has a lot of trouble trying to get together with Alaura, since she is very busy with work. Oliver likes Deena a lot, but he is also very intrigued by Christy, thus making him unsure of which woman is right for him. Meanwhile, Lorenzo sees Rosemary outside a restaurant and introduces himself to her. They get along right away and start dating, and they find that they have a lot of interests in common.
11	6	"The Royal Invitation"	December 1, 2013	TBA
The gentlemen continue to make progress in their respective relationships, but their time in Austin is coming to an end. The guys must prepare to ask their chosen ladies to a formal ball, where they will be revealing their true identities. Oliver agonizes over whether to invite Deena or Christy, but he eventually decides on Deena. The men proceed to invite the women to the big event, but the guys are very nervous about disclosing their identities and unsure what the reaction will be. At the grand ball, the undercover aristocrats reveal their real names and illustrious pedigrees. The four women are overwhelmed and somewhat confused at first, but they eventually accept the invitation to visit the men in their home countries.
12	7	"Royally Challenged"	December 8, 2013	TBA
After seeing Christy at the formal ball, Oliver regrets choosing Deena over her. To correct the situation, he makes a difficult decision and breaks up with Deena. Afterwards, Oliver goes to Christy to explain his actions, and she agrees to visit him in Ireland. The four gentlemen then say farewell to each other in Austin and return to their homelands, where they await the arrival of their chosen ladies, with mixed results.: Alexander and Alaura: while he is waiting for Alaura to visit him in Saint Petersburg, Alexander gets a phone call from her. She tells him that because of her increasing work commitments, she is not able to visit him. She is very apologetic and tells him that he deserves a woman who can give him her full attention, which Alaura is not able to. Alexander is very disappointed and returns to England to see his mother, Princess Olga, who commiserates with him about the bad timing. Although he did not find a soulmate this time, Alexander remains optimistic that he will meet the right lady for him one day.; Lorenzo and Rosemary: she flies to Rome to be with Lorenzo, and they continue their romance. They then travel to Lamezia Terme in the south of Italy to meet his family. Rosemary is quite nervous about meeting his parents, but they welcome her and find her very charming and beautiful. Lorenzo's affection for Rosemary increases as they spend more time together, and he is very happy that she gets along well with his family. She agrees to extend her stay in Italy, and he hopes that this will lead to a lasting relationship.; James and Kitty: she travels to London to see James, who is very pleased to have her there. They meet for tea with his sisters, Rachel and Lily, and things go reasonably well. Although the relationship is blossoming, James is quite concerned about the long distance between their respective homes, since either of them moving would be a big upheaval. Ultimately, James asks Kitty if she would consider living in London, since he doesn't want her to leave, and she also wants to stay.; Oliver and Christy: she flies to Ireland to visit Oliver at his family's ancestral home, Dunsany Castle. Their relationship continues to grow as they tour the local area and visit a traditional Irish pub. Oliver's brother, Lord Dunsany, hosts a formal dinner to get to know Christy, and he interrogates her alone after the meal. Although Christy is anxious, Lord Dunsany is impressed by her and thinks that she would fit in well. Oliver continues to have strong feelings for Christy, and she reciprocates. He proposes to move to Austin so that he can be close to her, and she likes that idea.

== See also ==
- Undercover Princesses
- Undercover Princes
