= Polylux =

Polylux may refer to:

- Polylux (overhead projector), produced in the German Democratic Republic
- Polylux (TV program), is a weekly half-hour German television program
