= VEB Polytechnik =

Former company from the GDR

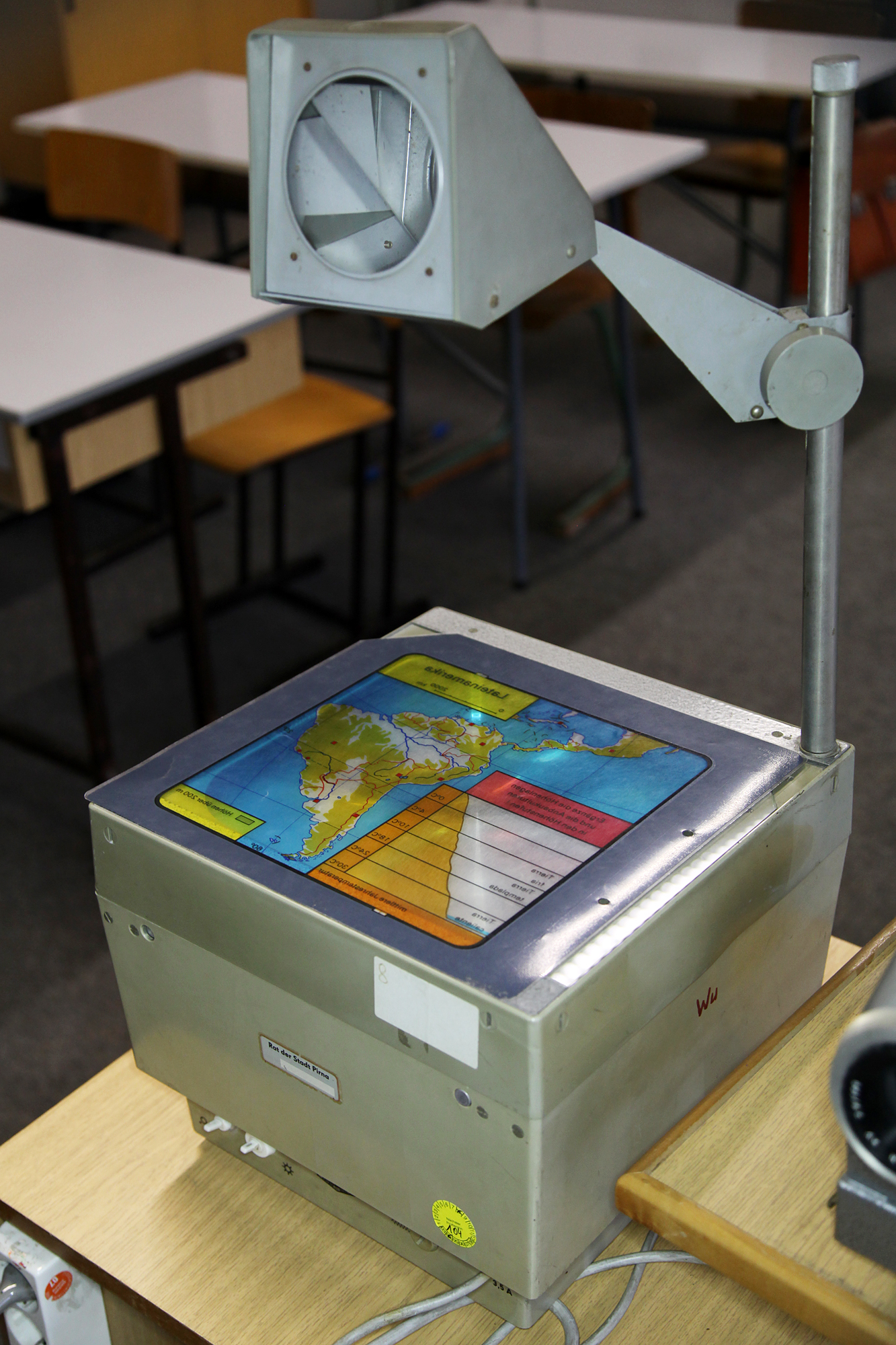
Overhead projector "Polylux"

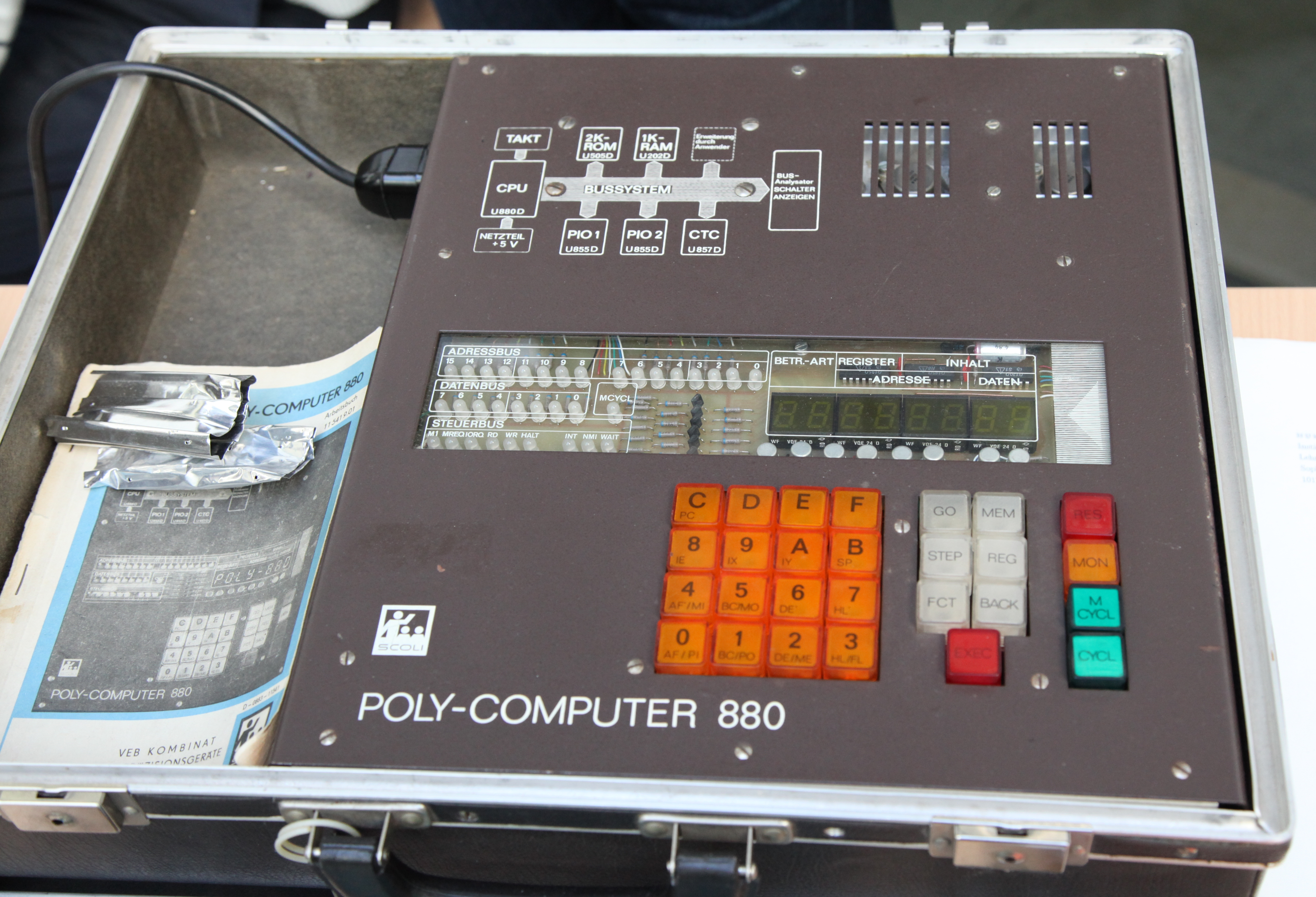
Microcomputer teaching kit "Poly-Computer 880"

VEB Polytechnik was a company from the German Democratic Republic (GDR) located in Chemnitz (then called Karl-Marx-Stadt). In the GDR, it was mainly known for producing overhead projectors, called Polylux.

The company was founded in 1870 as Reißzeugrichter and manufactured drawing table tools. In 1874 the founder Emil Oskar Richter invented the bow compass. After switching its focus to overhead projectors in the late 1960s, it was renamed to VEB Polytechnik. After the collapse of the GDR, the remains of VEB Polytechnik were rescued in a new company called Polytechnik Frankenberg GmbH. It produced overhead projectors and hand lever cutting machines. The new company was closed in 2006.

In 1983, the company started manufacturing a microcomputer teaching kit called "Poly-Computer 880". VEB Polytechnik is also known for creating Poly Play, the only arcade video game to be made in the German Democratic Republic.
