= Prime Time Theater =

Theater in Berlin

Coordinates: 52.54316°N 13.36424°E

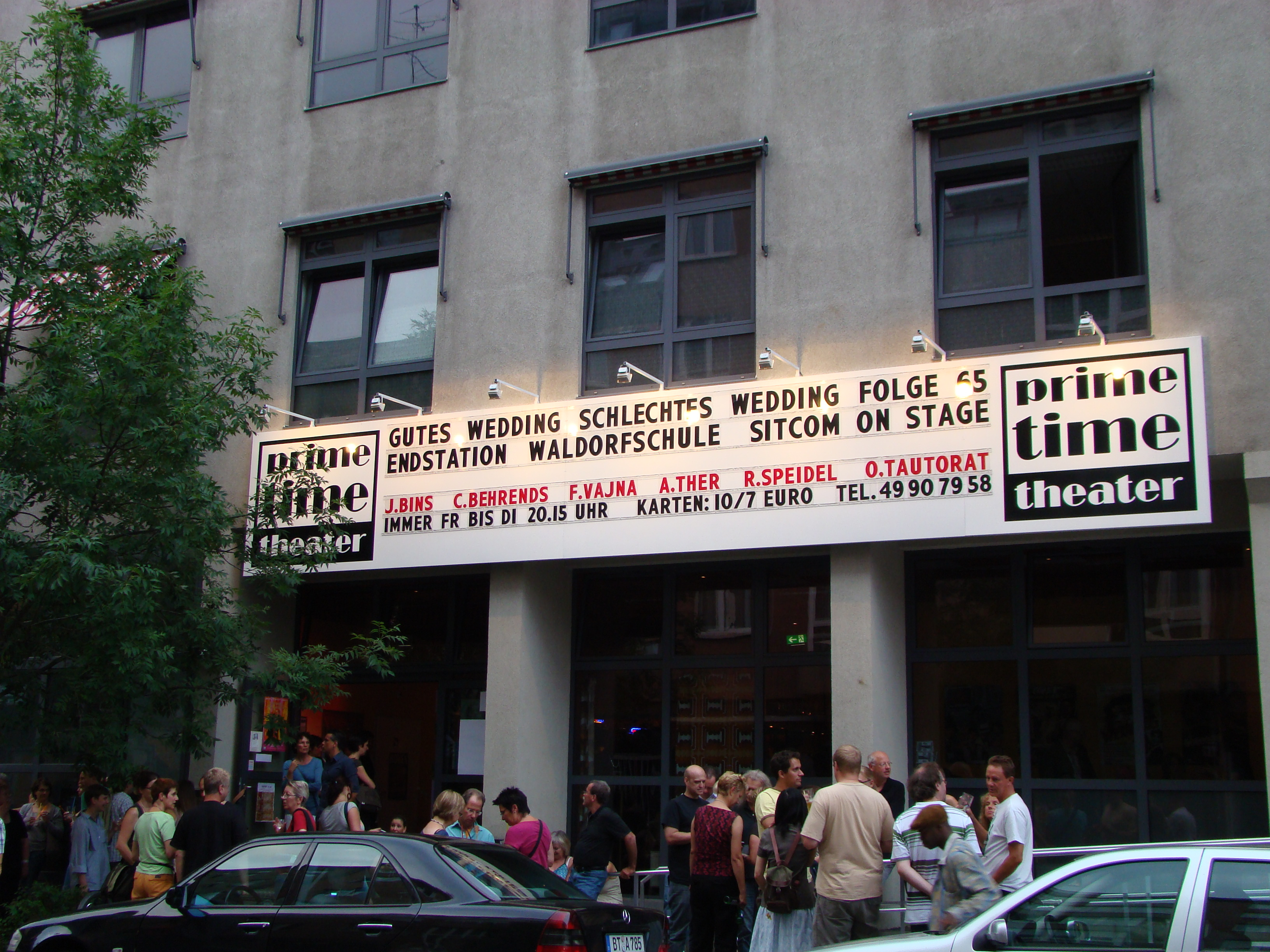
Prime Time Theater at the corner of Müllerstr./Burgsdorfstr.

The Prime Time Theater is a modern Volkstheater ("People's Theater") in Berlin’s Wedding district. The name of the theater derives from the fact that the time the play starts marks the beginning of prime time.

== History ==
The Prime Time Theater was founded by actors Constanze Behrends and Oliver Tautorat on December 3, 2003. The theater is located in Soldiner Kiez, a residential area in the Gesundbrunnen district. Initially, Behrends and Tautorat were the only featured actors. Together they produced the sitcom Gutes Wedding, Schlechtes Wedding (Good Wedding, Bad Wedding). Since its founding in 2003, the theater has expanded its cast of actors and has relocated several times. In 2009, the current theater was renovated with help from the European Regional Development Fund (ERDF) and the Computerspielemuseum Berlin. The current building contains a 220-seat auditorium and features a bar.

== Productions ==
All Prime Time Theater productions are original plays. Episodes 1 through 100 were written by Behrends. The cast members developed the episodes and characters. The main sitcom performed is Gutes Wedding, Schlechtes Wedding. Occasionally, old plays, which are mostly parodies of well-known television or literary genres such as CSI Wedding, Eine Sommanachtstaraum (parody of A Midsummer Night's Dream), or Wedding’s Angels, are performed. All the cast members portray multiple characters during each performance.

== Cast ==
- Oliver Tautorat (founder and art director)
- Cynthia Buchheim (since 2011)
- Daniel Zimmermann (since 2012)
- Alexandra Marinescu (since 2012)
- Philipp Lang (since 2013)
- Julia Franzke (regular supporting character since 2012)
- Robert Martin (regular supporting character since 2014)
- Katharina Bertus (regular supporting character since 2011)
- Alexander Ther (cast member until 2011 and regular supporting character since 2013)
- Noémi Dabrowski (regular supporting character since 2014)

Additional members of the ensemble are Philipp Hardy Lau (director, author and film producer), Mic Kwok Wai Kam (costume designer), Jens Hagemann (stage designer) and Marc Poritz (video artist).

== Gutes Wedding, Schlechtes Wedding (Good Wedding, Bad Wedding) ==
In Germany, the stage sitcom Gutes Wedding, Schlechtes Wedding (Good Wedding, Bad Wedding) is unique in its form. The title refers to the most popular German soap opera ''Gute Zeiten, Schlechte Zeiten'' (Good Times, Bad Times). The series parodies typical television formats and uses video clips to increase the feeling of a television night.

Every fifth week a new episode is released. As with soap operas, new viewers can easily enter the story line because each episode begins with a summary of the previous episode. To date, thirteen seasons and 110 episodes have been produced. The continuous story line is developed by the ensemble and is primarily set in the neighborhood of Wedding. Friedrichshain, Prenzlauer Berg, and even Uckermark are part of the story line. Stereotypical Berlin character tropes are used, e.g., an Urberliner (someone originally from Berlin).
