= Tita von Hardenberg =

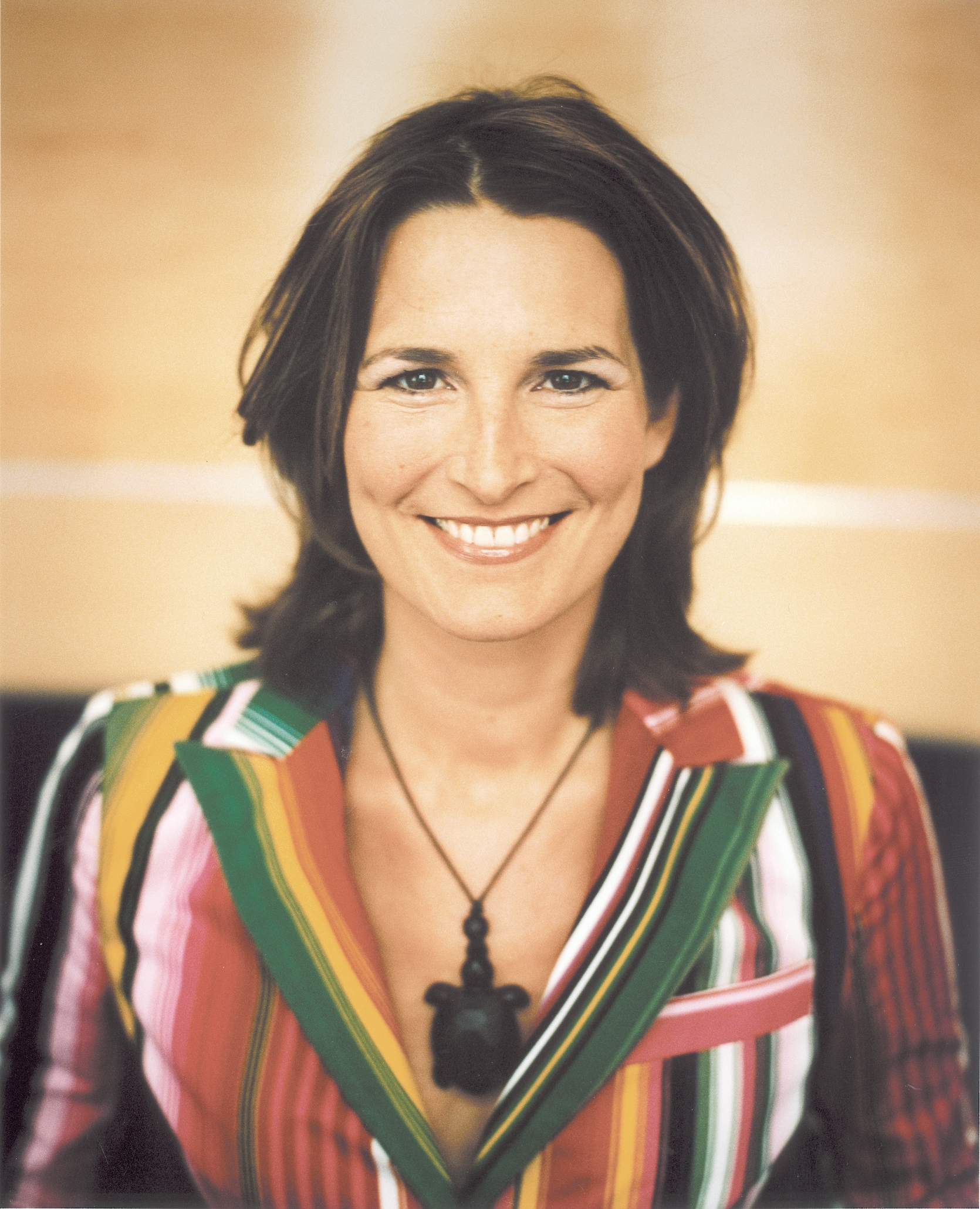
- Tita von Hardenberg in 2004
- Born: Katharina Isabel Gräfin von Hardenberg; April 21, 1968 (age 58); Hamburg, Germany
- Other name: Katharina Habsburg-Lothringen-Kyburg
- Occupations: Journalist and television personality
- Years active: 1991–present
- Spouse: Ferdinand Habsburg-Lothringen-Kyburg (1999–present)
- Children: 3

Katharina Habsburg-Lothringen-Kyburg (née Katharina Isabel Gräfin von Hardenberg; born 21 April 1968), known professionally by her stage name Tita von Hardenberg, is a German noblewoman, television journalist, presenter and producer.

== Early life ==
Countess Katharina Isabel was born as daughter of the banker Count Andreas von Hardenberg (b. 1937) and his wife Isa, Baroness von Hahn (b. 1941). She hails from ancient German nobility. The Hardenberg family has had its seat at Nörten-Hardenberg since 1287.

== Life ==
She grew up in Lüneburg and Isernhagen near Hanover; passing her Abitur 1987 at the Rudolf-Steiner-Schule in Berlin. After that, she studied history and political science in Munich. Later, she obtained a Master of Science from the London School of Economics (LSE).

== Marriage and issue ==
Tita von Hardenberg has been married to Archduke Ferdinand Karl of Austria (Ferdinand Habsburg-Lothringen-Kyburg) (b. 1965), since 1999. They live in Berlin and have three children:

- Archduke Jakob Maximilian, born 22 Jan 2002
- Archduchess Paulina, born 14 Jan 2004
- Archduchess Lara Sophie, born 9 Oct 2007

== Career ==
Her first contact was in 1991 during a traineeship at the regional station FAB in Berlin. She went on to become an editor for the daily programme Fenster aus Berlin. Between 1992 and 1994, she worked at the ORB's magazine TIP TV, serving as its chief editor between 1995 and 1997.

In 1997, von Hardenberg, together with Stefan Mathieu and Michael Khano, founded the company Kobalt Productions Film und Fernseh GmbH. Her company produced the magazine format Polylux for the RBB. Apart from performing as the host for Polylux which was broadcast on Das Erste since 2001, she also made her own reports.

Between 2001 and 2003, she wrote a weekly column called Schöner leben ("Better Living) for the weekly newspaper Die Zeit.

Von Hardenberg's company also developed the political magazine Absolut (1997–2009) and the music magazine Tracks. The European magazine Yourope has also been produced by her company since 2010. In 2011, she developed the weekly culture programme zdf.kulturpalast hosted by Nina Sonnenberg and Pegah Ferydoni on ZDFkultur. Since 2012, Kobalt Productions has produced several installments of the culture show Metropolis on ARTE.

In 2011/2012, von Hardenberg produced the documentary series Kulturkrieger ("Culture Warriors"). with Katrin Sandmann on ZDFkultur and 3sat. Also in 2012, she produced two new live music shows, introducing for RBB/ARTE and Berlin Live on ZDFkultur.

On 20 October 2012, von Hardenberg hosted the festive concert for the 100th anniversary of the Deutsche Oper Berlin, which led to controversial reactions.

== Honorary positions ==
Von Hardenberg has been the patron of the BUND Berlin Environmental Award since 2005 and has been the official sponsor of the Bethel Children's Hospice for dying children since 2010 . In addition, she has been engaged since 2006 as an ambassador for the Berlin Child Protection Agency.

Von Hardenberg supported the Berlin Pro-Reli referendum campaign, which wanted Berlin pupils to be allowed to choose between the ethics class, a compulsory class introduced in all Berlin schools in 2006, and a religion class. In the referendum, 51.4% voted against the change in law; the approval quorum of 25% was also not achieved.

In June 2018, Hardenberg was elected to the board of trustees of the children's relief organization "Plan international Deutschland ev" .

== Awards ==
- 2007: Grimme Online Award for the online video portal Polylog.tv (discontinued)
- 2015: Bronze World Medal in the category History & Society at New York Festivals - World's Best TV & Films for "The Age of the Supermodels"
