= Hardenbergh =

Hardenbergh is a surname. Notable people with the surname include:

- Augustus Albert Hardenbergh, Congressman from New Jersey
- Cornelius A.J. Hardenbergh, politician from New York
- Henry Janeway Hardenbergh, American architect
- Johannes Hardenbergh, High Sheriff
- Jacob Hardenbergh (1823–1872), New York politician
- Jacob Rutsen Hardenbergh (1736–1790), First President of Rutgers, grandson of Johannes

== See also ==
- Hardenbergh, alternate name for Hardenburg, California
- Isaac Hardenbergh House (also known as The Hardenbergh Manor)
- Hardenberg (surname)
- Hardenberg (disambiguation)
- Hardenburg (disambiguation)
