= Francisco de Borbón y Escasany, 5th Duke of Seville =

5th Duke of Seville (1943–2025)

Francisco de Borbón y Escasany
- Duke of Seville, Grandee of Spain
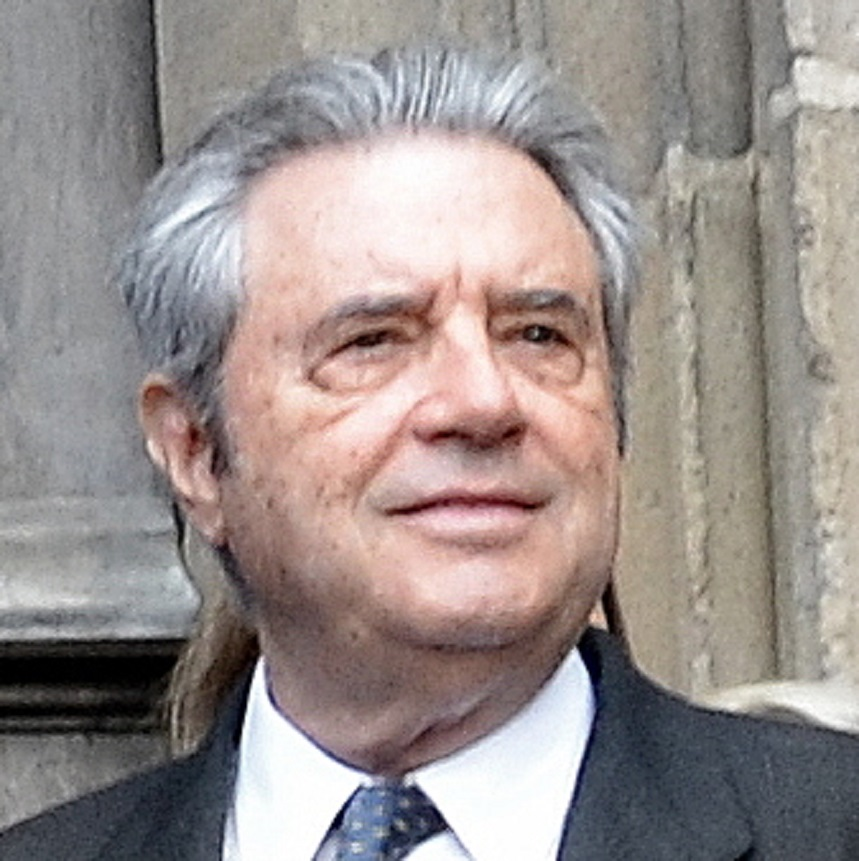
- Pictured in 2015
- Born: 16 November 1943; Madrid, Spain
- Died: 20 May 2025 (aged 81); Madrid, Spain
- Spouse: Countess Beatrice von Hardenberg (m. 1973; div. 1989) Isabelle Karanitsch (m. 1991; div. 1993) María de los Ángeles de Vargas-Zúñiga y Juanes (m. 2000)
- Issue: Olivia de Borbón y Hardenberg; Cristina de Borbón y Hardenberg; Francisco de Borbón y Hardenberg
- House: Bourbon-Anjou
- Father: Francisco de Borbón y Borbón
- Mother: Enriqueta Escasany y Miquel

Francisco de Paula Enrique de Borbón y Escasany, 5th Duke of Seville, Grandee of Spain (16 November 1943 – 20 May 2025) was a Spanish nobleman and businessman who was involved in banking, real estate and other commercial activities. He inherited the title of Duke of Seville in 1968 and was a distant relative of the Spanish royal family.

== Early life ==
Borbon y Escasany was born in Madrid as the eldest child of Francisco de Borbón y Borbón (1912–1995), who was the younger son of Francisco de Borbón y de la Torre and Enriqueta de Borbón y Parade, 4th Duchess of Seville. His mother was Enriqueta Escasany y Miquel (1925–1962), daughter of Ignacio Escasany y Ancell and Enriqueta de Miquel y Mas, 2nd Marquesa de Pobla de Claramunt.

His paternal grandparents were first cousins, both being grandchildren of Infante Enrique of Spain. The Duke of Seville was a member of the Spanish branch of the House of Bourbon and was a relative of King Felipe VI of Spain, since both are descendants of King Charles IV of Spain.

== Duke of Seville ==
After the death of his grandmother, Enriqueta de Borbón y Parade, he inherited the title of Duke of Seville. His father had renounced his own rights to succeed to the title in 1968.

== Marriages and children ==
Borbon y Escasany was married on 7 July 1973 at Baden-Baden to Countess Beatrice Wilhelmine Paula von Hardenberg (28 June 1947 in Donaueschingen – 14 March 2020 in Marbella), daughter of Count Günther von Hardenberg [ de ] and his wife, Princess Maria Josepha of Fürstenberg (granddaughter of Maximilian Egon II, Prince of Fürstenberg). The couple had three children and divorced on 30 June 1989 in Madrid.

They had two daughters and one son:

- Olivia Enriqueta María Josefa de Borbón y Hardenberg (born 6 April 1974 in London), entrepreneur and PR for jewelry brands; married to Julián Porras-Figueroa y Toledano (born 1982), with two children.
- Cristina Elena de Borbón y Hardenberg (2 September 1975 in Madrid – 13 February 2020 in Madrid), chef and catering service operator.
- Francisco de Paula Joaquín de Borbón y Hardenberg (born 21 January 1979 in Madrid), entrepreneur and also appeared on the first season of TLC's reality television series, Secret Princes. In 2018, he was elected as 50th Grand Master of the Order of Saint Lazarus (Malta-Paris obedience). On 9 October 2021, he married Sophie Elizabeth Karoly, with whom he has a son, Francisco Máximo de Borbón y Karoly (born 2017).

He married for the second time on 19 October 1991 at Vienna to Isabelle Eugénie Karanitsch (born 23 November 1959 in Vienna), daughter of Franz M. Karanitsch and Tatjana Cimlov Karacevcev. They had no children and divorced on 17 June 1993 in Madrid.

Borbon y Escasany married for the third time on 2 September 2000 at Marbella to María de los Ángeles de Vargas-Zúñiga y Juanes (born 19 November 1954). She is the daughter of Manuel de Vargas-Zúñiga y la Calzada and María de los Ángeles de Juanes y Lago, and her paternal grandfather was the 12th Conde de la Oliva de Plasencia. They had no children together, but she has children from a previous marriage.

== Order of Saint Lazarus ==
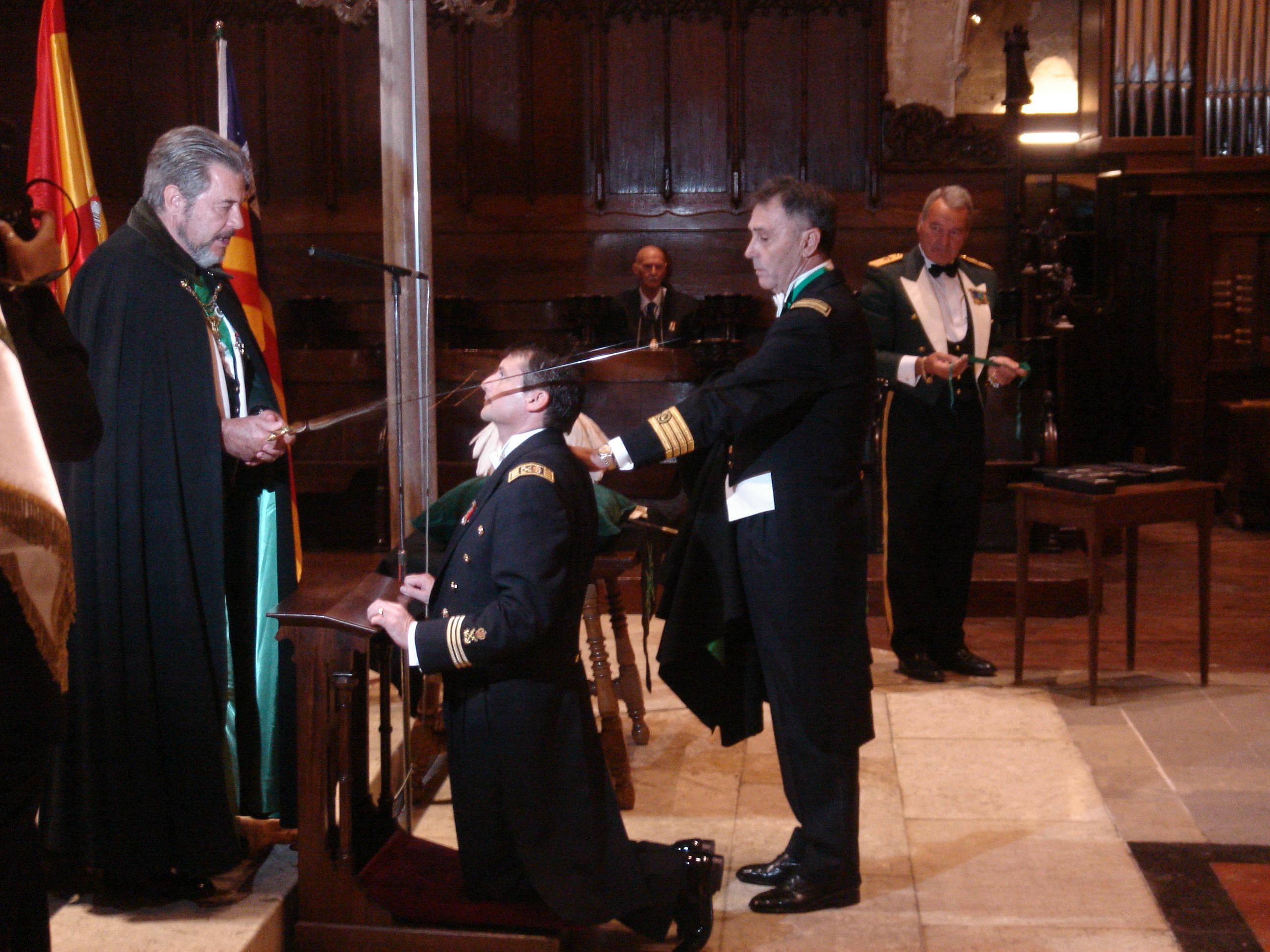
The Duke of Seville performing the accolade with a knighting sword during an investiture ceremony in 2007

The Duke of Seville was elected as 48th Grand Master of the Order of Saint Lazarus (Malta obedience) on 5 October 1996 at Santa Maria della Passione in Milan, Italy. He succeeded his father, who had been Grand Master of the Order since 1956.

He retired from his position of Grand Master in 2008 and was succeeded by his cousin, Carlos Gereda y de Borbón, Marqués de Almazán. The Duke of Seville was then given the title of Grand Master Emeritus. In 2018, the Duke of Seville's son was elected as 50th Grand Master of the Order of Saint Lazarus (Malta-Paris obedience), succeeding Carlos Gereda y de Borbón.

== Sons of the American Revolution ==
The Duke of Seville joined the Wisconsin Society of the Sons of the American Revolution in 2001 on the service of his Patriot ancestor King Charles III of Spain, who gave an order to send firearms and medicines to the Patriot cause. The Duke of Seville served as the first President of the Spain Society SAR from its founding in 2010 until his passing in 2025.

== Death ==
The Duke of Seville died in Madrid on 20 May 2025, at the age of 81, only ten days after his brother Alfonso's death.

== Distinctions ==
Coat of arms as Grand Master of the Order of Saint Lazarus

=== Titles and styles ===
- 16 November 1943 – 22 October 1968: Don Francisco de Borbón y Escasany
- 22 October 1968 – 20 May 2025: The Most Excellent The Duke of Seville

=== Honours ===
- 48th Grand Master (1996–2008) of the Order of Saint Lazarus (Malta Obedience)
- Commander of the Order of Civil Merit
- Knight Grand Cross of the Order of the Eagle of Georgia and the Seamless Tunic of Our Lord Jesus Christ
- Senator of the Grand Badge of the Order of the Queen Tamara
- Consejero Magistral (President) of the Corps of the Nobility of the Principality of Asturias

== Sources ==
- The Royal House of Stuart, London, 1969, 1971, 1976, Addington, A. C., Reference: II 97

Spanish nobility
Preceded by Enriqueta de Borbón y Parade	Duke of Seville; 1968–2025	Vacant Succession Dispute
