= Hardenberg (disambiguation) =

== Places ==
Hardenberg

- Hardenberg, a municipality and city in Overijssel, Netherlands
- Nörten-Hardenberg, a municipality in Lower Saxony, Germany
- Hardenberg Castle, ruin at Nörten-Hardenberg, ancestral seat of the lower-saxonian House of Hardenberg
- Schloss Hardenberg, castle once owned by the westphalian House of Hardenberg in the German town of Velbert
- Neuhardenberg, a municipality in Brandenburg, Germany. Formerly residence of the Prussian statesman Prince Karl August von Hardenberg
- Hardenberg, the former German name for Twarda Góra, Poland

Hardenburg

- Hardenburg, California, United States

Hardenburgh

- Hardenburgh, New York
- Hardenbergh Hall, Rutgers University
- Hardenburgh Avenue Bridge, Demarest, New Jersey
- Hardenburgh, Indiana (now known as Hayden)

== People ==
- Hardenberg (surname)

== See also ==
- Hardenberger
- Hardenbergh
- von Hardenberg
