= Polylux (overhead projector) =

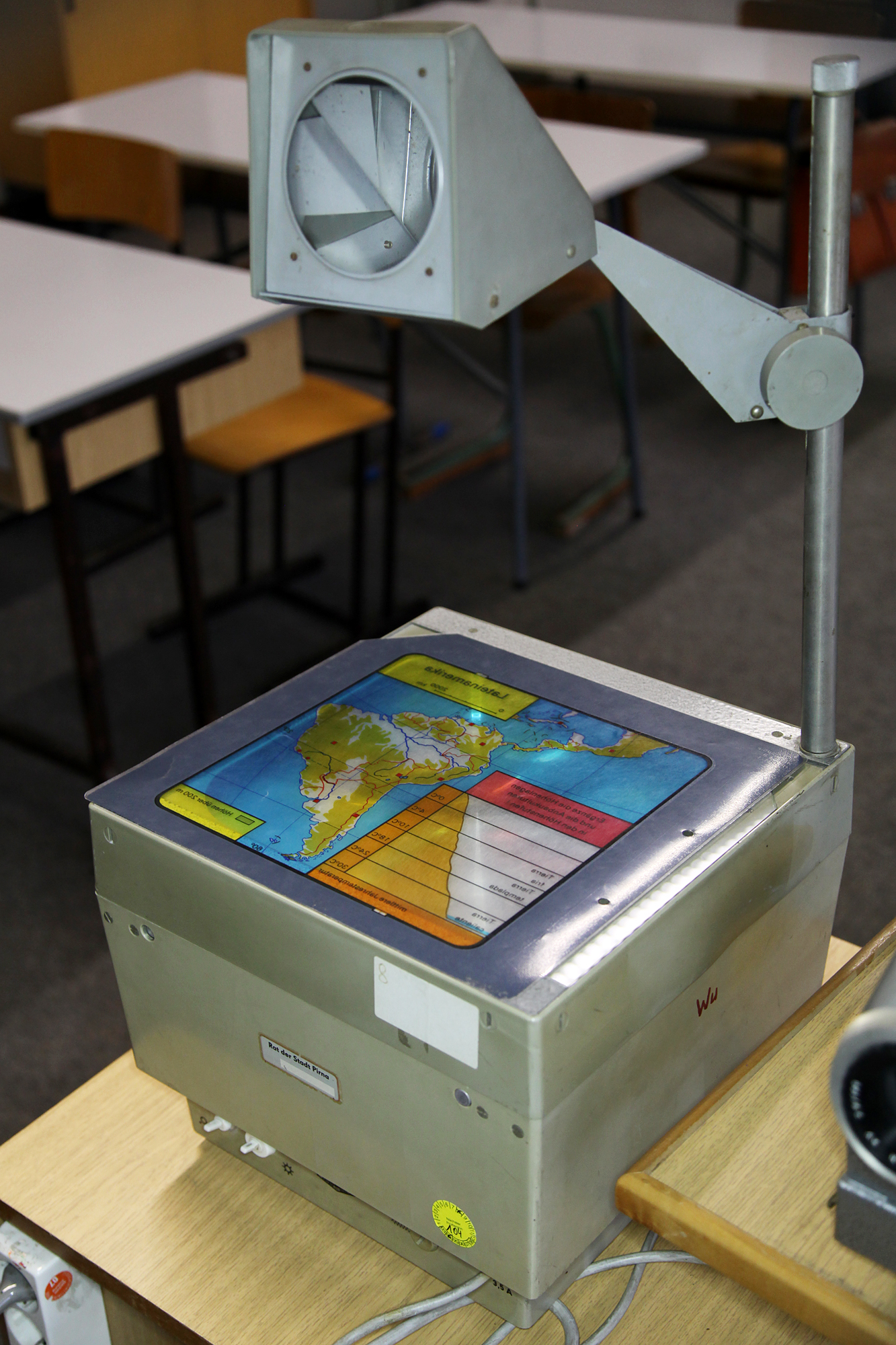
A Polylux

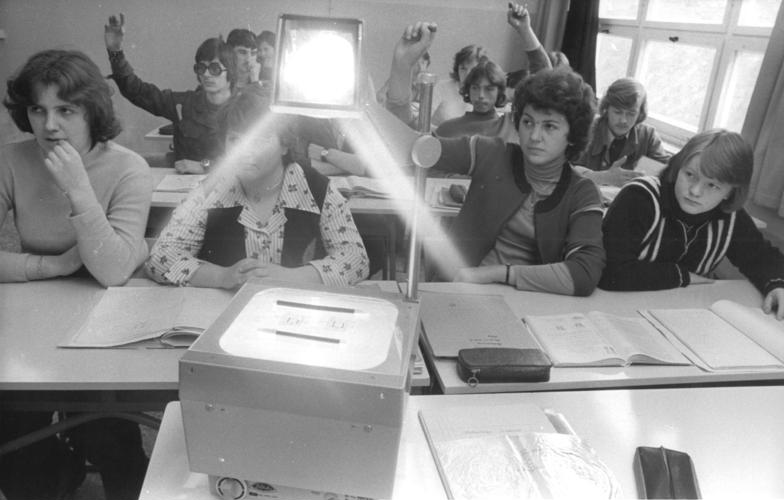
A Polylux in a classroom

The Polylux was an overhead projector produced in the German Democratic Republic (GDR). It also functioned as a generic name for overhead projectors in the GDR.

The Polylux was produced in the VEB (Volkseigener Betrieb: people’s enterprise) Phylatex-Physikgeräte DDR, in Frankenberg near Chemnitz (then known as Karl-Marx-Stadt). It was, amongst others, widespread in educational institutions in the GDR. After 2004, Polylux was a registered trademark of the company Polytechnik Frankenberg GmbH, which as a successor firm of the original Polylux producer continued to produce the device. Until the Wende in 1989, 27,000 devices were produced on average each year, and were also exported to the Soviet Union. In the year 2004, 6,000 devices were still being produced.

In 2006, the enterprise closed down.

The word Polylux (from Greek and Latin, meaning "much light") originates with Erich Schöpe, a physicist and former director of the Polylux manufacturer. Today, the word enjoys cult status as a typical GDR word and is still widespread in everyday language of the East German states.

A television show produced by Ostdeutscher Rundfunk Brandenburg (now Rundfunk Berlin-Brandenburg) was named after the Polylux with reference to the "enlightening" function of the device.

The body of the Polylux consisted of plastic and contained a ventilator with delayed shutdown in order to avoid a heat build-up. The light source was a halogen light bulb for a standard line voltage. It contained a switch for two different light intensity levels.

Originally, the lenses of the device were made out of glass. In order to reduce the weight, lenses made of plastic were later used. In particular, the Fresnel lens with its large surface area, on which transparencies were placed, was made out of plastic.
