= Francisco de Borbón von Hardenberg =

Spanish-German aristocrat

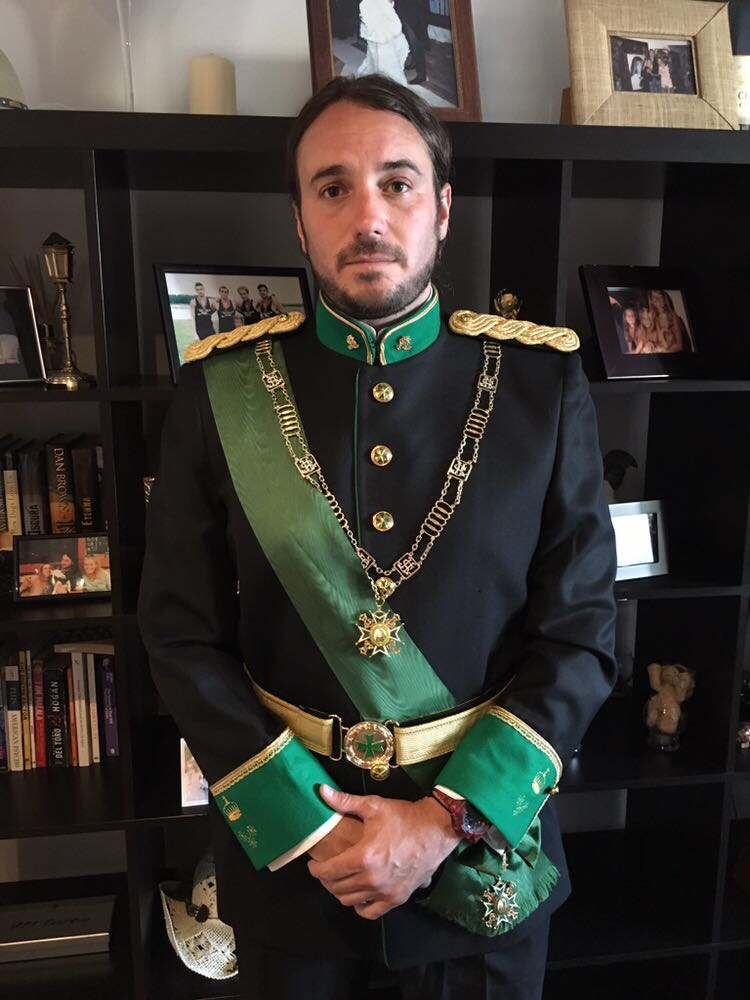
- De Borbón von Hardenberg in 2019
- Born: 21 January 1979 (age 47); Madrid, Spain
- Spouse: Sofia Károlyi (m. 2021)
- Issue: Francisco Máximo de Borbón y Károlyi
- House: Bourbon
- Father: Francisco de Borbón y Escasany, 5th Duke of Seville
- Mother: Countess Beatrice von Hardenberg

Don Francisco de Paula Joaquín de Borbón y Graf von Hardenberg-Fürstenberg (born 21 January 1979) is a Spanish-German aristocrat, television personality, and businessman. He is a relative of the Spanish royal family and the Grand Master of the Malta-Paris obedience of the Order of Saint Lazarus.

== Early life and education ==
De Borbón von Hardenberg was born on 21 January 1979 in Madrid to Francisco de Borbón y Escasany, 5th Duke of Seville and Countess Beatrice Wilhelmine Paula von Hardenberg-Fürstenberg.

He was educated at the American School of Madrid and Gulliver Preparatory School. In 2001, he graduated from Barry University with a degree in sports management and business.

== Career ==
He worked as a sports manager and coach for various clubs before becoming a FIFA agent in 2005. He co-owns the company Alpha Trading. In 2012, he joined the World Economic Forum's Forum of Young Global Leaders. That same year, he became a cast member on the American reality television series Secret Princes.

In 2014, he was named Spain's "Entrepreneur of the Year" and received the Laurel de Platino award.

He and his sister, Olivia, co-founded the Beatrice von Hardenberg Foundation, focused on chronic obstructive pulmonary disease.

== Orders and societies ==
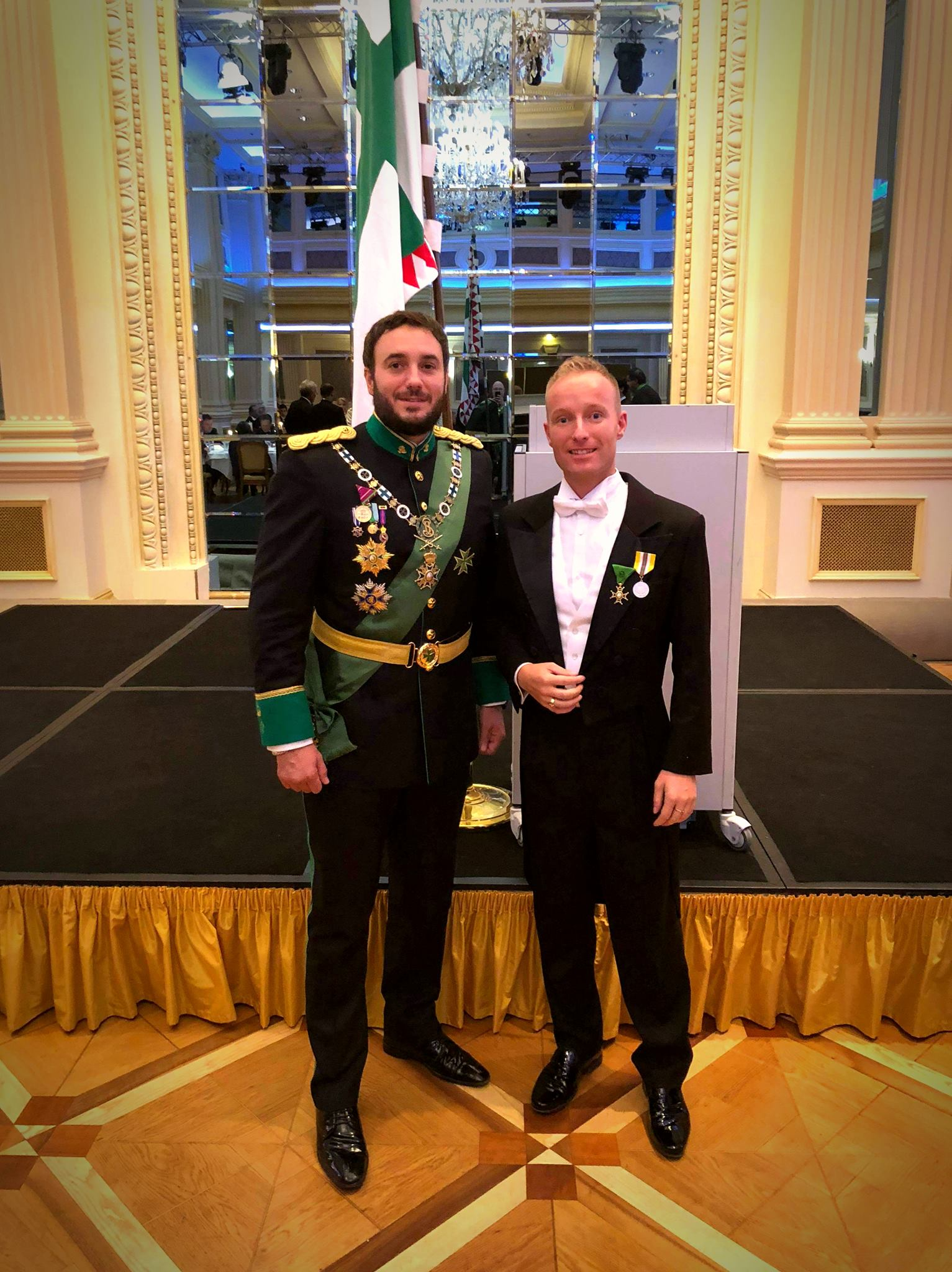
de Borbón von Hardenberg (right) with Nathaniel Filip de Aras (left) in 2018

In 2009, de Borbón von Hardenberg became a member of the Grand Council and the Coadjutor Grand Master of the Order of Saint Lazarus. He was appointed Grand Master ad interim of the order and was elected and installed as the Ordinary Grand Master on 5 May 2018. He is also a Knight of the Principality of Asturias.

He is a member of the Spanish society of the Sons of the American Revolution as a descendant of King Charles III of Spain, who gave an order to send firearms and medicines to the Patriots during the American Revolutionary War.

== Personal life ==
On 9 October 2021, he married Sofia Károlyi at Seville Cathedral. The couple had been living together since 2016 and Károlyi gave birth to their son, Francisco Máximo de Borbón y Károlyi, in 2017.

He did not inherit the Dukedom of Seville upon the death of his father in 2025 and submitted a claim to the title, against his older sister's claim, to the Spanish government.

=== Arrest ===
According to news reports, de Borbón von Hardenberg was connected to a drug trafficking group responsible for smuggling the largest cocaine shipment ever seized in Spain.

On 2 February 2026, he was arrested by the Spanish police and charged with money laundering. He was allegedly involved in a money laundering network established through an Irish-based cryptocurrency company he co-founded, Finetch Europe. Francisco de Jorge, a judge on the Audiencia Nacional, said that there is "reasonable evidence" against de Borbón von Hardenberg and, after confiscating his passport, released him on a €50,000 bail.
