= Olivia de Borbón von Hardenberg =

Spanish-German aristocrat

- Born: 6 April 1974 (age 52); London, England
- Spouse: Julián Porras-Figueroa y Toledano
- Issue: Flavia Porras y Borbón; Fernando Enrique Porras y Borbón
- House: Bourbon
- Father: Francisco de Borbón y Escasany, 5th Duke of Seville
- Mother: Countess Beatrice von Hardenberg

Doña Olivia Enriqueta María Josefa de Borbón y Gräfin von Hardenberg-Fürstenberg (born 6 April 1974) is a Spanish-German aristocrat and relative of the Spanish royal family. She is the current heiress to the Dukedom of Seville, left vacant by the death of her father in 2025.

== Early life ==
De Borbón von Hardenberg was born in London on 6 April 1974 to Francisco de Borbón y Escasany, 5th Duke of Seville and Countess Beatrice Wilhelmine Paula von Hardenberg-Fürstenberg. She and her two younger siblings, Cristina and Francisco, grew up in Marbella.

== Career ==
She and her brother founded the Beatrice von Hardenberg Foundation, named in honor of their mother, that focuses on chronic obstructive pulmonary disease.

In 2004, she competed on the Spanish reality television series La Granja.

== Personal life ==
She married the businessman Julián Porras-Figueroa y Toledano in 2014 at the Hotel Villapadierna. She lives in Marbella with her husband and their two children, Flavia and Fernando.

Upon the death of her father in 2025, she filed for the rights to succeed to the Dukedom of Seville as his oldest child.
