= American School of Madrid =

School in Madrid, Pozuelo de Alarcón, Spain

- Colegio Americano de Madrid
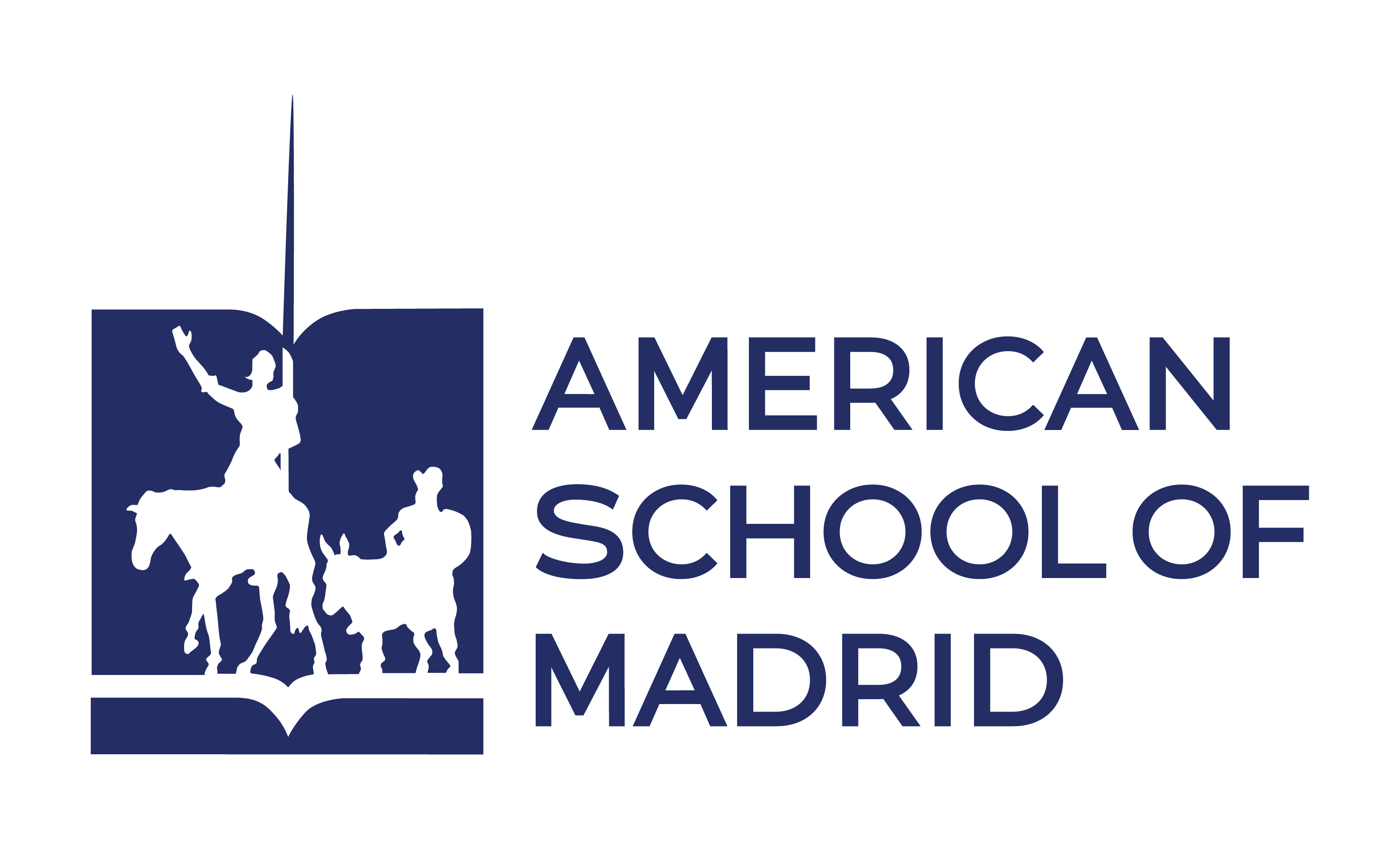

Location
- Madrid, Pozuelo de Alarcón; Spain; 40.44363711350703°N 3.782010740268178°W

Information
- Type: International school
- Established: February 20, 1961; 65 years ago
- Founder: Kelly Gardener
- Headmaster: Benjamin Weinberg
- Grades: K-12
- Enrollment: 974
- Colours: Blue and Red
- Mascot: Don Quixote and Sancho Panza
- Nickname: Lancers
- Website: www.asmadrid.org

The American School of Madrid (ASM) (Spanish: Colegio Americano de Madrid) is a private international school in Madrid, Spain that was founded in 1961.

== History ==
The American School of Madrid was founded in 1961 by members of The American Club in Madrid.

It was initially located in several buildings in the Madrid: Calle Joaquin Costa, Calle Dr. Fleming and Calle Pinar. Kelly Gardener was the first Headmaster. In 1962, ASM Board architect, Bob Parker, obtained a ten-acre plot on the outskirts of Madrid, near Aravaca, as a future home of the school. On November 2, 1967, ASM opened in its current location, on calle América in Pozuelo de Alarcón.

On May 21, 2025, Ukrainian lawyer and politician Andriy Portnov was shot dead outside the school.

== Campus ==
ASM is an IB World School.The K-12 program is accredited by the Middle States Association of Colleges and Schools and the Spanish Ministry of Education. The 11-acre campus is located 10 kilometers west of the Madrid City center.

Lower School Building

- Learning Commons
- Gymnasium
- Early Childhood Center
- Play Landscape

Middle School Building

- Zero-energy building with modern science labs
- Performing Area and moveable furniture
- Middle School Commons

Upper School Building

- Learning Commons
- Cafeteria

Athletics Complex and Center for the Sciences

- Gymnasium
- Fitness and weights room
- Health and yoga room
- Science & Robotics Labs
- ASM Innovation, Design, and Education Hub
- The Da Vinci Space

Center for the Arts

- 600-seat Auditorium
- Art classrooms
- Music classrooms
- Drama classroom
- Multi-purpose room

Outdoor Campus

- All-purpose weather track
- Turf soccer field
- Multi-purpose field for baseball and other sports
- Two tennis courts
- Outdoor Play and Learning Landscape (2023)

== Accreditation ==
ASM is accredited by:

- The International Baccalaureate Organization
- The Spanish Ministry of Education
- The Middle States Association of Schools and Colleges

They are affiliated with:

- the European Council of International Schools (ECIS)
- the National Association of Independent Schools (NAIS)
- the Mediterranean Association of International Schools (MAIS).

== Demographics ==
ASM is made up of 36% U.S. citizens, 27% Spanish citizens, and 37% international students from more than 50 countries.

In the 2021-2022 school year, average enrollment was 1030.

== Faculty ==
In the 2020-2021 school year, there were 193 faculty members.

Among the staff are several technology coordinators and assistants, guidance counselors for each school, librarians, nurses, maintenance staff and administrators, including the Heads of Admissions, Development, and Communications.

== Student activities ==
ASM offers the following extracurricular activities:

- Art Club
- Arts and crafts
- Ceramics
- Computer Art and Graphics
- Drama for Middle School and for Upper School
- Photography
- Computer Programming
- Science Club
- Study Skills
- Computer Club
- Creative Correspondence
- Games for Fun: Scrabble, Juggling
- Music Theatre
- Journalism Club
- Theater Stage Design
- Scouting
- Global Citizens Club

== Athletics ==
ASM has 2 outdoor tennis courts, 2 basketball courts, 2 turf soccer fields, a baseball diamond, and 2 gymnasiums.

- Tennis
- Soccer
- Volleyball
- Basketball
- Golf
- Ballet
- Tap
- Modern Jazz
- Baseball

== Notable alumni ==
- Francisco de Borbón von Hardenberg, Spanish aristocrat and businessman
- Lincoln Díaz-Balart, former Republican congressman from Florida.
