= Computerspielemuseum =

German video game museum

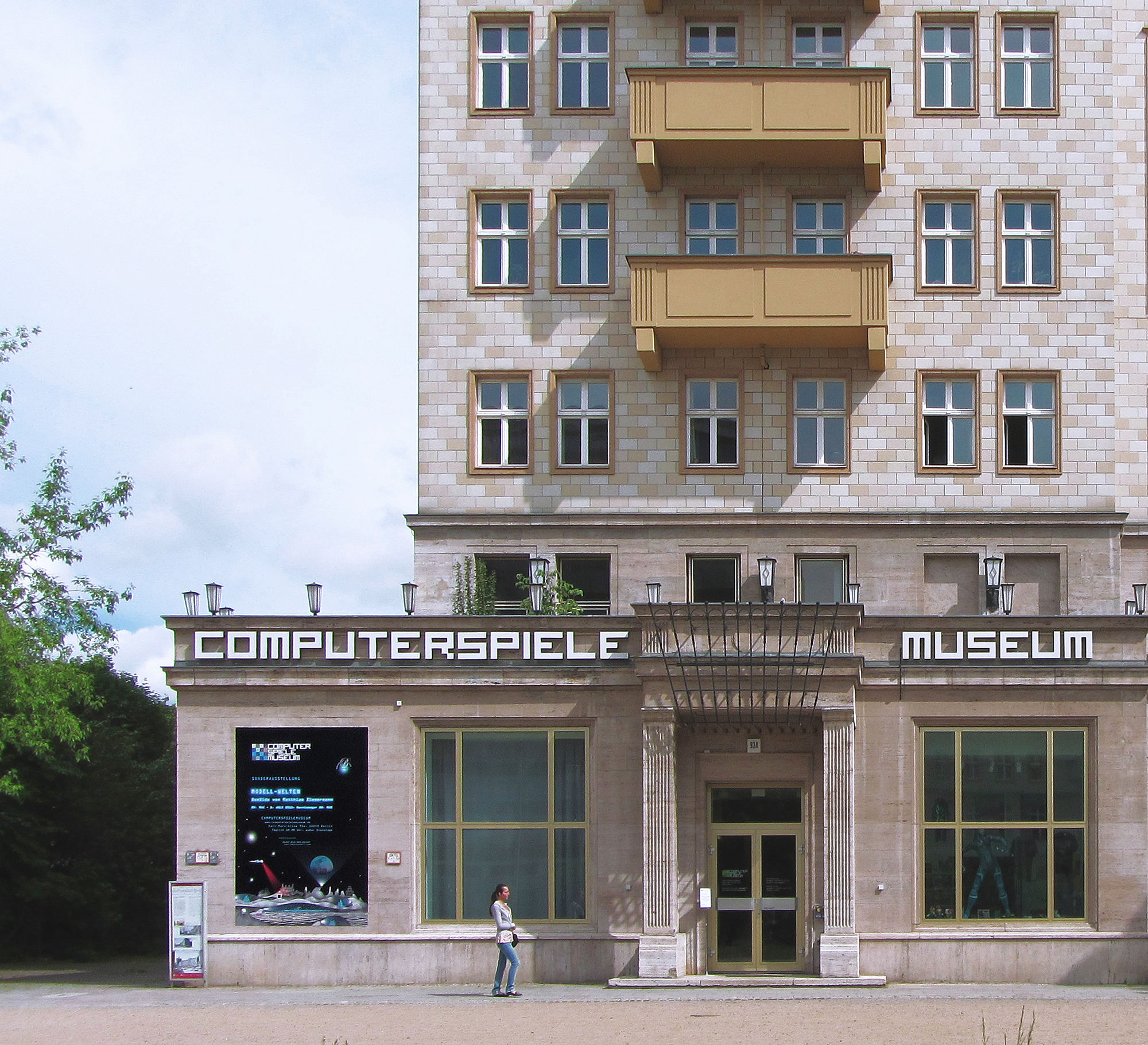
- The Computerspielemuseum in 2013
- Established: 1997 (reopened 2011)
- Dissolved: 2000 (original exhibition)
- Location: Karl-Marx-Allee, Friedrichshain, Berlin, Germany
- Coordinates: 52°31′03″N 13°26′31″E
- Type: Video game museum
- Collection size: >37,000 items
- Owners: Booster Club for Youth and Social Work
- Website: www.computerspielemuseum.de

The Computerspielemuseum (German for "Computer Game Museum") is a German video game museum founded in 1997. From 1997 to 2000, it had a permanent exhibition in Berlin. Afterward, it became an online-only museum. In 2011, the museum reopened its permanent exhibition in Berlin's neighborhood of Friedrichshain, on Karl-Marx-Allee. During the first month of its permanent exhibition, it had 12,000 visitors.

== General ==
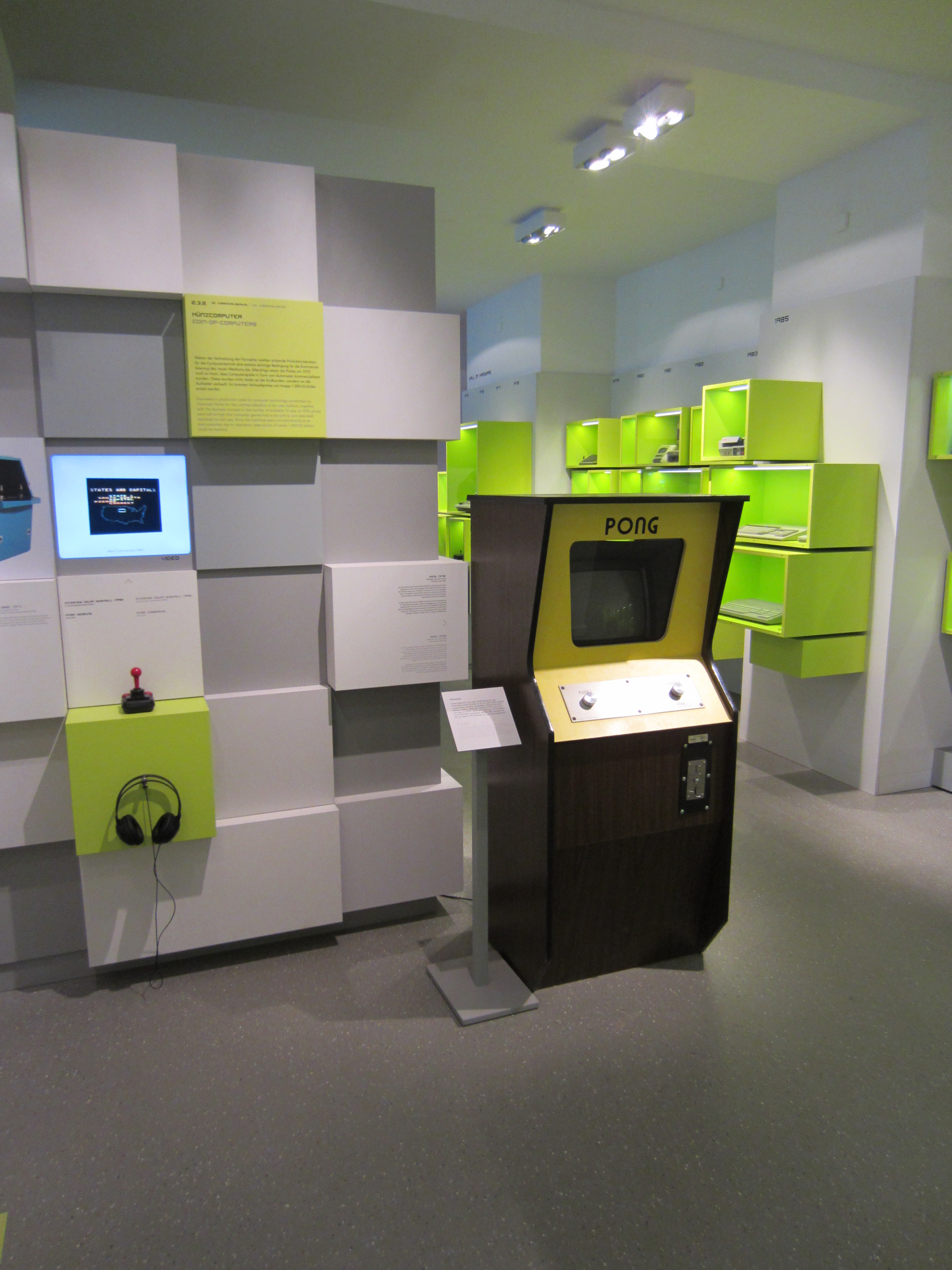
Exhibited consoles including arcade machines such as Pong

The Computerspielemuseum opened the first permanent exhibition in the world for digital interactive entertainment culture in 1997 in Berlin. After that, it became responsible for 30 national and international exhibitions. Among these was the project "pong.mythos" sponsored by the German Federal Cultural Foundation, Germany's most successful traveling exhibition in the history of computer games. In the last five years, over 470,000 visitors have seen this exhibition. The museum contains around 25,000 data storage devices with games, around 12,000 technical magazines, many historical arcade games, home computers and console systems, and an extensive amount of other documents, for example: videos, posters, and handbooks. It contains one of the largest collections of entertainment software and hardware in Europe.

The Computerspielemuseum's collection is the property of the Booster Club for Youth and Social Work. The museum itself is run by Gameshouse GmbH. Building the new permanent exhibition was financed by the German Lottery Fund in Berlin and from the Cultural Investment Program of Berlin's Cultural Affairs Department.

There are over 300 interactive exhibits illustrating the cultural history of computer gaming. One of the highlights is an actual video arcade from the 1980s with authentic arcade games from the decade that launched video games into popular culture. All console game systems are on display from the original Magnavox Odyssey from 1972 to more recent household devices like the Nintendo systems and all versions of the PlayStation family. An original exhibit in the museum is called the "PainStation", where the loser of the game is subject to physical punishment such as heat or a mild electric shock.

The Computerspielemuseum is a member of the International Council of Museums (ICOM) as well as the Nestor project, which is financed by the Federal Ministry of Education and Research.

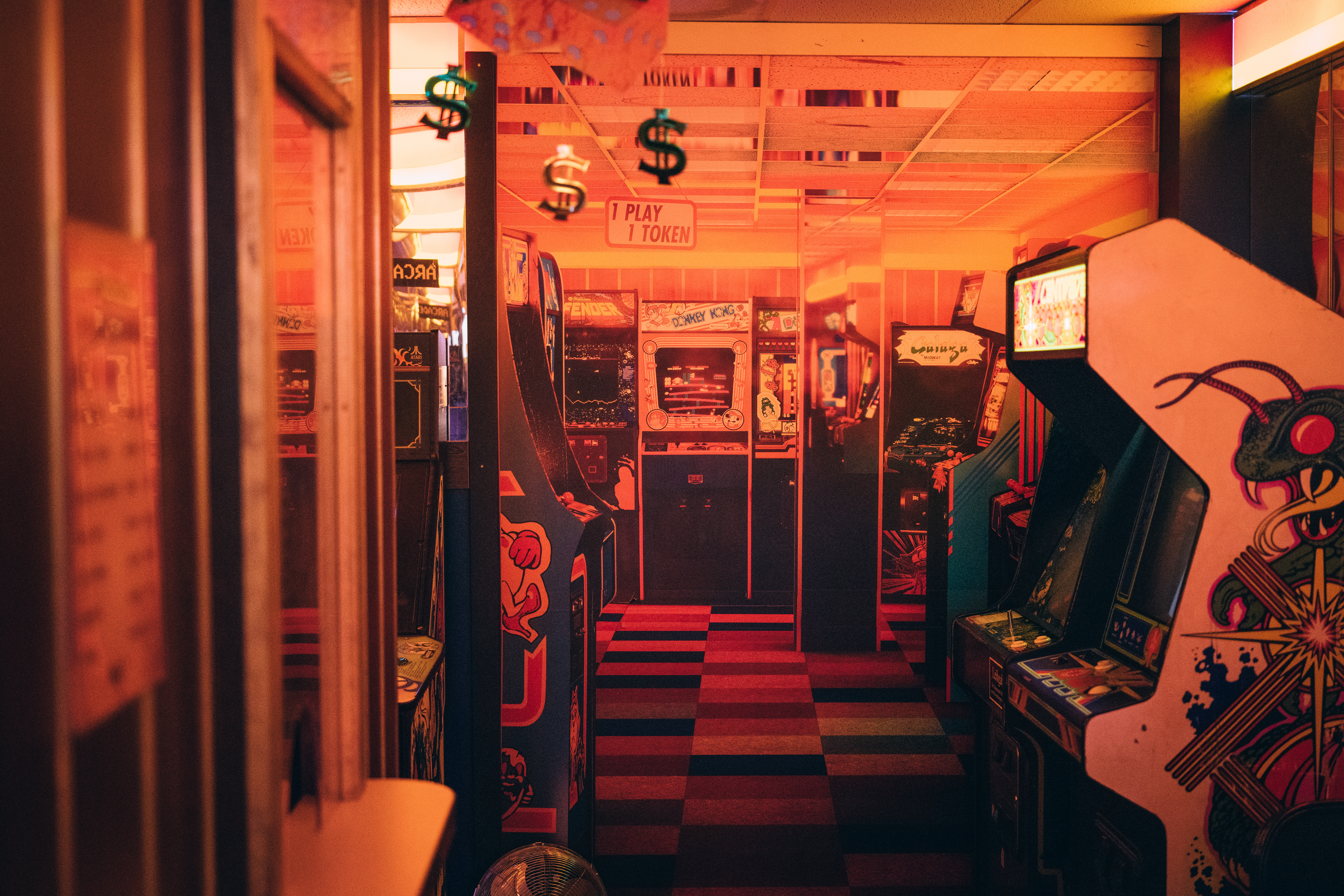
Recreated 1980s arcade

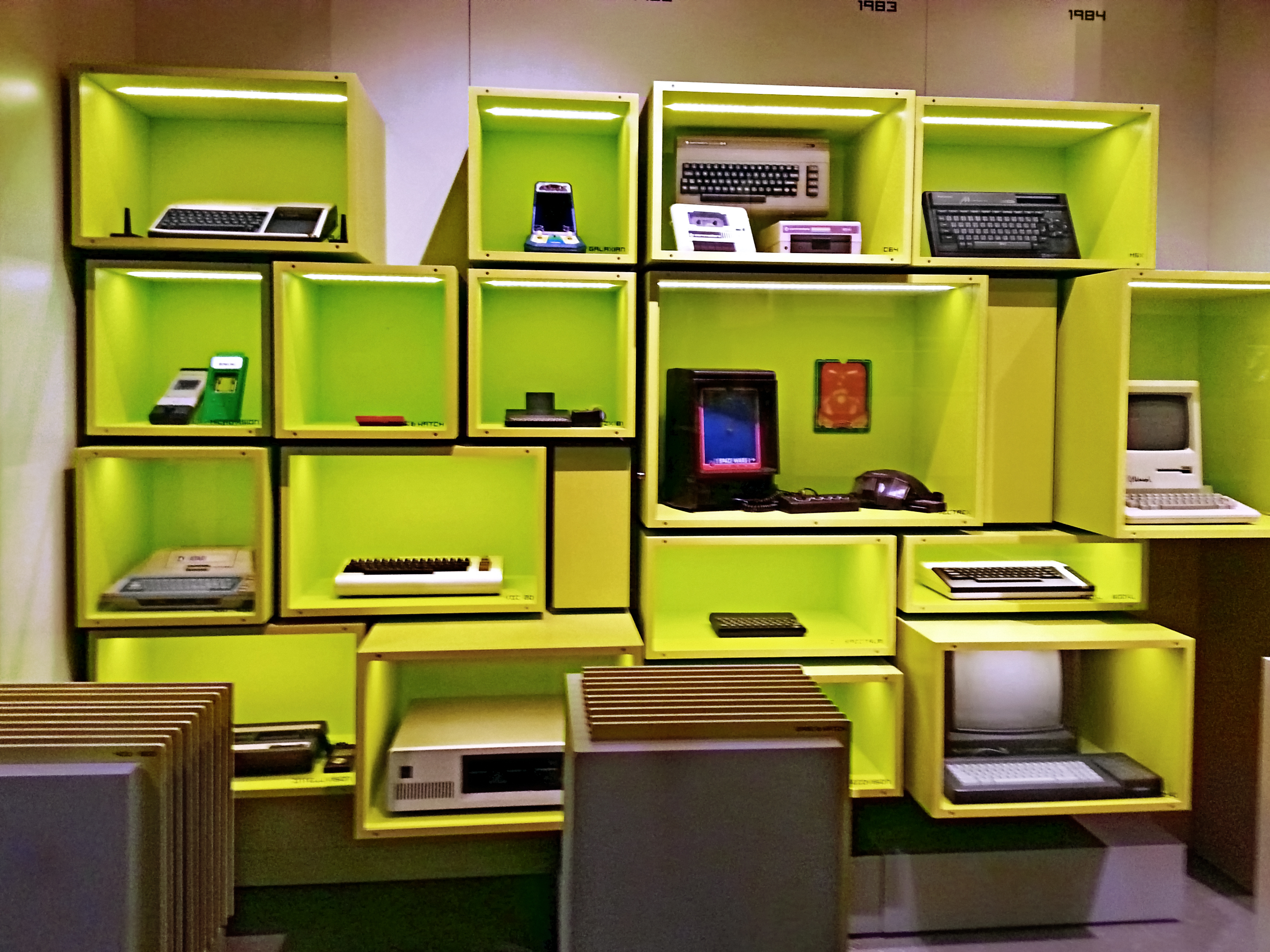
Home computers and consoles

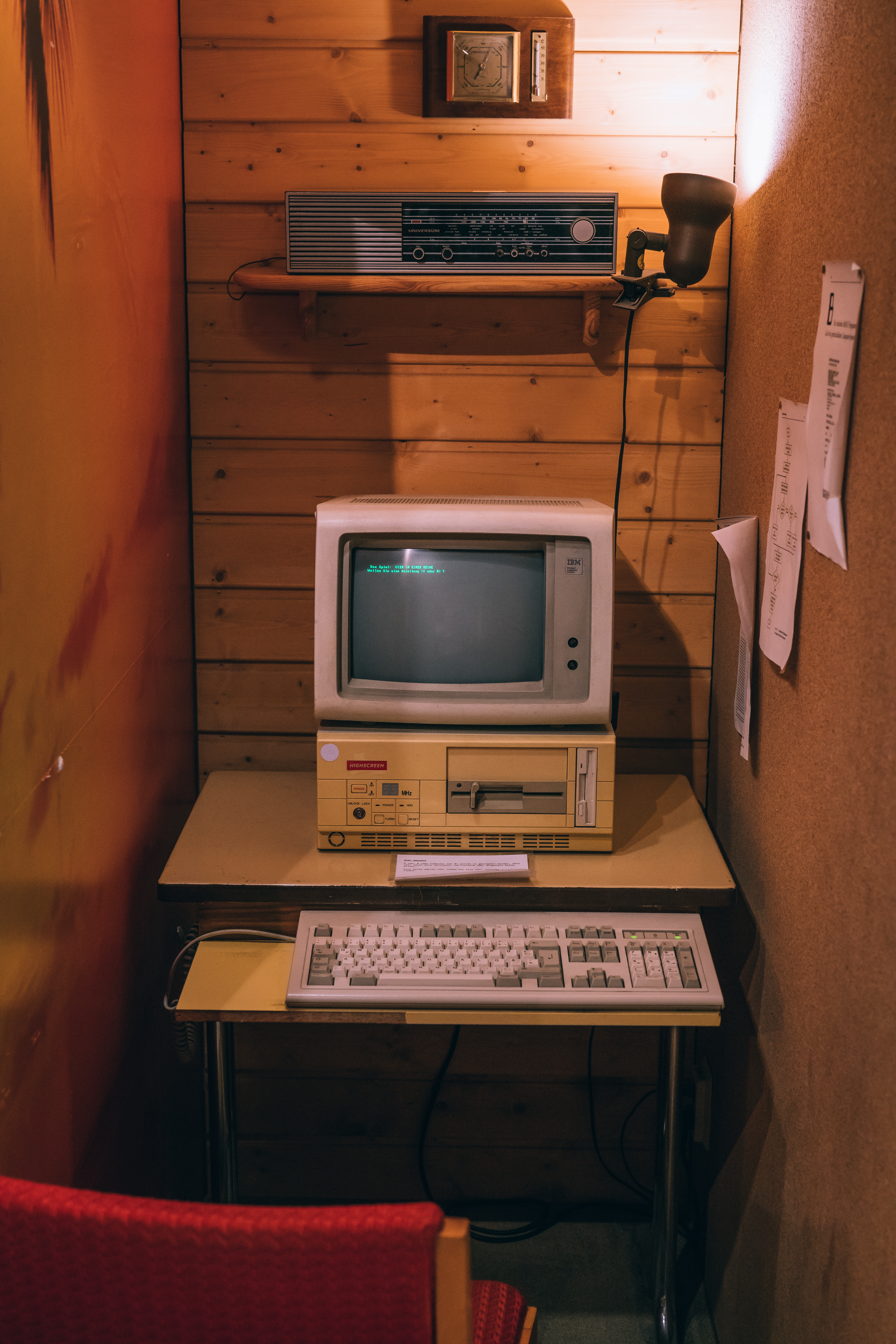
IBM PC compatible

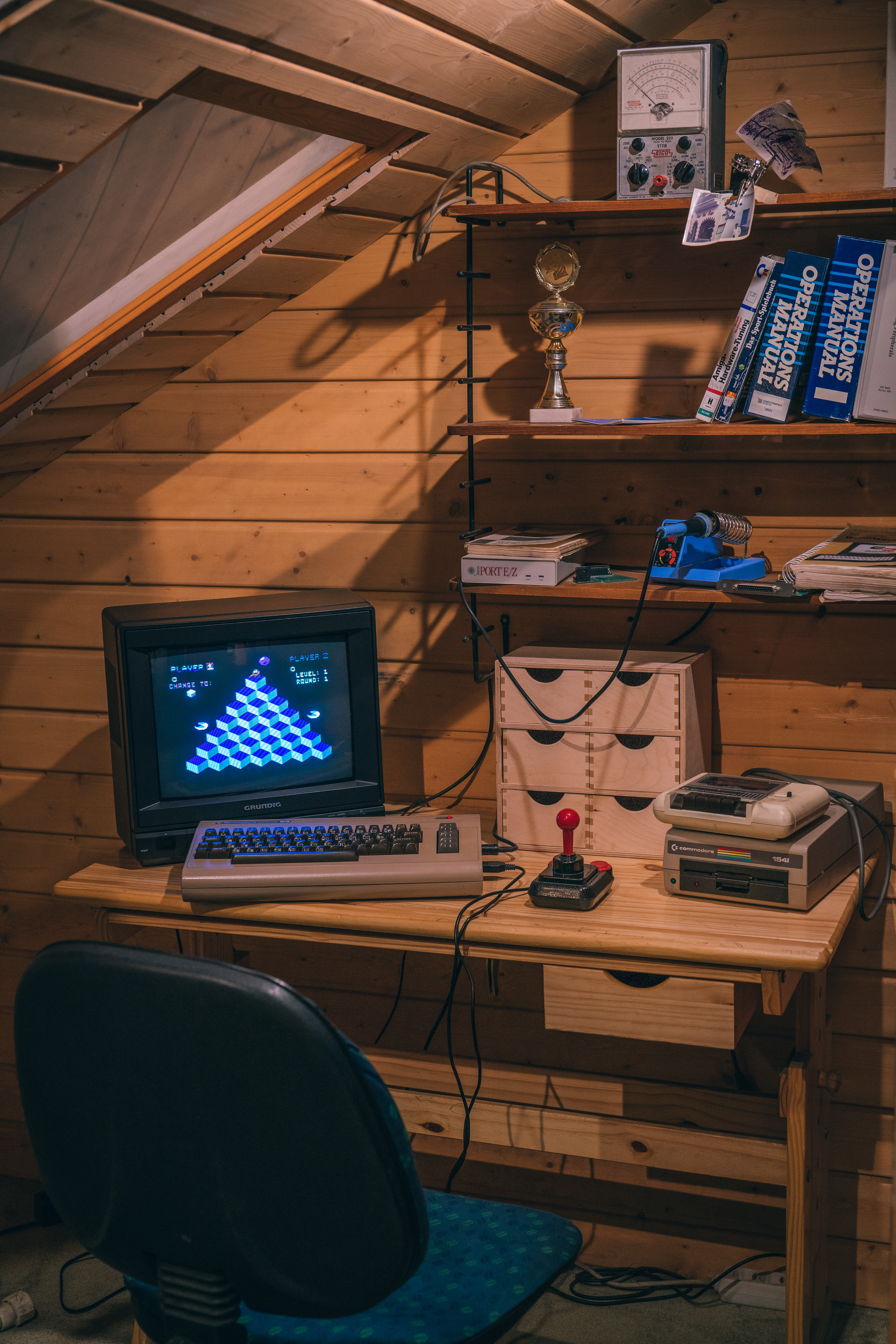
Commodore 64 running Q*bert

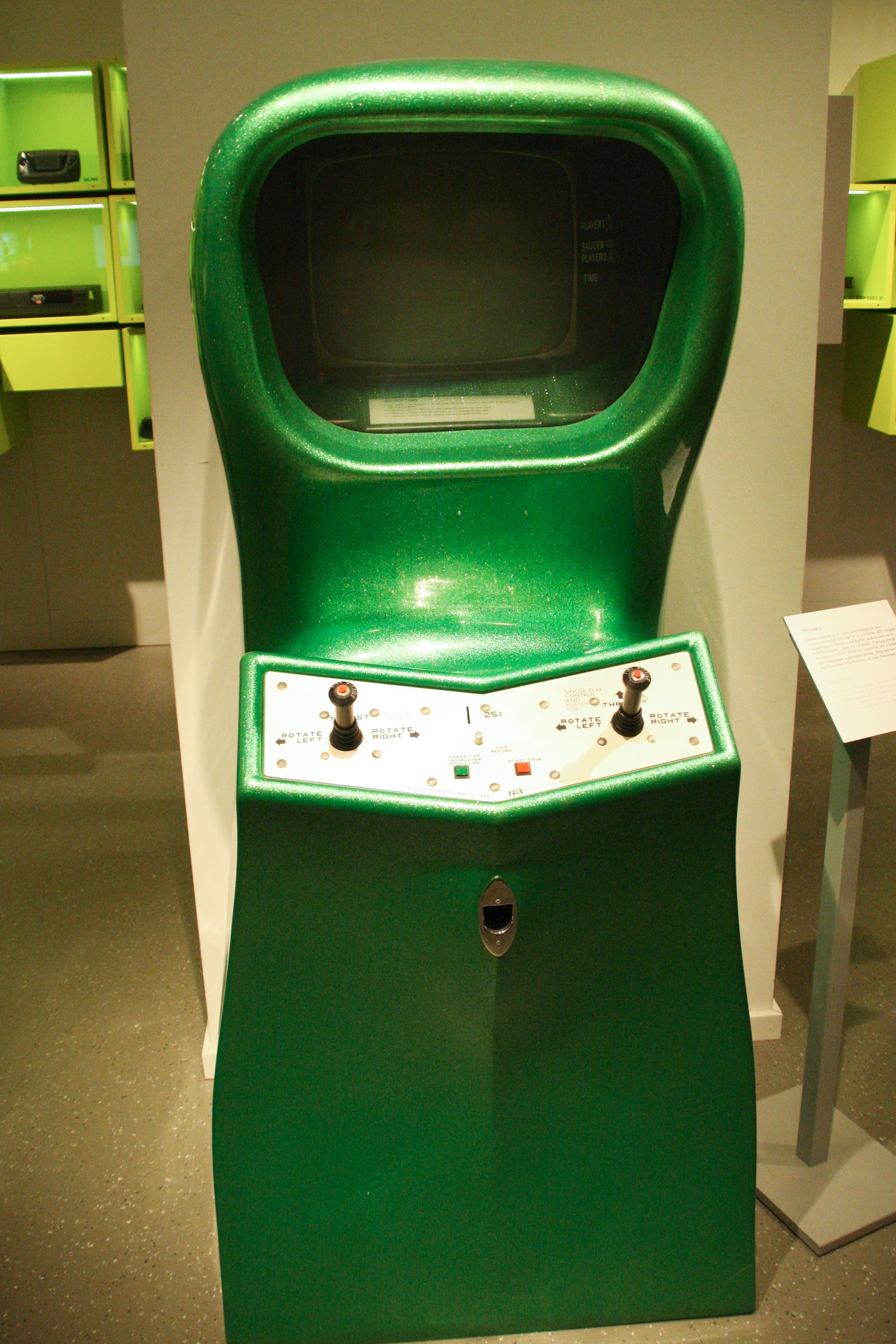
Computer Space

== Projects ==
The museum is a cooperative partner of the EU research project PLANETS (Preservation and Long-term Access through Networked Services). Besides that, it is also a contributor to the EU research project Keeping Emulation Environments Portable.

== Special exhibitions ==
The Computerspielemuseum shows in special exhibitions chosen games, books, merchandise etc. to different topics.

- Tell me more! Tell me more!- Fiction & Computergames (by we love old games, 2018)
- Monsters Attack Planet Earth (by we love old games, 2018)
- Bonus Level Japan (2019)
- ColdWarGames – It's All a Game (2025 - in conjunction with Allied Museum), including East German computer gaming such as Poly-Play

== Prizes ==
The museum won the German Children's Cultural Prize in 2002 and the Deutscher Computerspielpreis (German Computer games Prize) in 2017 in the category Special Award.
