= Mette Hardenberg =

Alleged Danish demon possession victim (1569–1629)

Mette Hardenberg (1569–1629), was a Danish noble and landowner. She was known as an eccentric, and became famous in contemporary Denmark when she believed herself to be possessed by a demon. She was also known for the pilgrimage as a beggar, which she undertook after a vision in a dream.

== Biography ==
She was born to riksråd Erik Hardenberg and in 1589 married noble landowner Preben Gyldenstjerne til Vosborg (d. 1616). Mette Hardenberg became insane in 1597: the insanity was believed to be caused by an obsession of a demon, and she was reportedly freed from it after having undertaken a pilgrimage as a beggar, an act to which she claimed to have been advised to in a dream.
