= Polylux (TV program) =

Polylux, the self-appointed "last/worst on the first [channel]" ("Das Letzte im Ersten"), was a weekly half-hour German television program hosted by Tita von Hardenberg. It was produced by RBB for Das Erste and was broadcast in the timeslot on Thursdays at 11:15 CET.

The show, which was concerned with politics, culture, and social trends, offered a lively blend of documentary and satirical items. Typically it began with a satirical 'report' by Carsten von Ryssen related to a current matter of public concern. The show's essential hipness, which was underlined by Hardenberg's crisp announcements and the visual and thematic backdrop of the city of Berlin, infuses the subsequent documentary pieces with a certain esprit. Thematically, their scope ran from coverage of political and social movements to current trends in underground and popular culture, whereby one piece was usually biographical in nature, setting it off from the more panoramic style of the rest of the show. Less serious segments often echoed the satire of the keynote feature. Regular items included the (usually biweekly) "Berlin for Beginners" ("Berlin für Anfänger") and the show's end note, in which Manfred Dumke, an elderly pensioner, shared his curious insights on current affairs with the rest of Germany from the comfort of his own living room.

The feature "Berlin for Beginners" was in fact a vestige from the beginnings of the program in the mid 1990s when Polylux was still called "Tip TV" and was the televised version of the Berlin city magazine Tip, then already hosted by Hardenberg, but on a regional TV station, FAB. When Tip was taken over in 1997, the new owners didn't want the show, but the ORB was interested in the format, and so it was taken on under the new title of Polylux. In 2000 the ARD adopted Polylux into its late night programming on Das Erste, showing it at 04:00. However the youthful appeal of the program quickly earned it an earlier slot, which was on Mondays at midnight. It was then moved to a slot on Thursdays before it was canceled.

== Cancellation ==
The RBB announced the cancellation of the show, effective by the end of 2008, on May 21 of the same year. The decision was reasoned with a lack of funding. The last show was aired on 18 December 2008. The show's offshoot web portal Polylog.tv was kept available for about two more years, but eventually the domain became expired and is unavailable as of 2016.
