= Beatrice von Hardenberg =

German-Spanish aristocrat

Countess Beatrice von Hardenberg
- Born: 28 June 1947; Donaueschingen, Germany
- Died: 14 March 2020 (aged 72); Marbella, Spain
- Spouse: Francisco de Borbón y Escasany, 5th Duke of Seville (m. 1973; div. 1989)
- Issue: Olivia de Borbón y Hardenberg; Cristina de Borbón y Hardenberg; Francisco de Borbón y Hardenberg
- Father: Count Günther von Hardenberg
- Mother: Princess Maria Josepha of Fürstenberg

Countess Beatrice Wilhelmine Paula von Hardenberg zu Fürstenberg (28 June 1947 – 14 March 2020), formerly Beatrice de Borbón, Duchess of Seville, was a German-Spanish aristocrat and magazine editor. She served as director of Vogue Spain and, during her marriage to Francisco de Borbón y Escasany, 5th Duke of Seville, was a member of the extended Spanish royal family.

== Early life ==
Von Hardenberg was born on 28 June 1947 in Donaueschingen to Count Günther von Hardenberg and Princess Maria Josepha of Fürstenberg. She was a great-granddaughter of Maximilian Egon II, Prince of Fürstenberg. She grew up at Donaueschingen Palace, the seat of her mother's family, the House of Fürstenberg.

== Career ==
Von Hardenberg was a founder of Vogue Spain and served as the magazine's director in the 1980s.

== Personal life and death ==
She married Francisco de Borbón y Escasany, 5th Duke of Seville on 7 July 1973 in Baden-Baden. They had three children:

- Olivia Enriqueta María Josefa de Borbón y Hardenberg (born 6 April 1974 in London)
- Cristina Elena de Borbón y Hardenberg (2 September 1975 in Madrid – 13 February 2020 in Madrid)
- Francisco de Paula Joaquín de Borbón y Hardenberg (born 21 January 1979 in Madrid)

They divorced on 30 June 1989 in Madrid.

She died of cardiac arrest, brought on by chronic obstructive pulmonary disease, on 14 March 2020 in Marbella, one month after the death of her daughter, Cristina.
