= Alejandro Sureda =

Spanish architect (1815–1889)

Alexandre-Mathieu Sureda Chappron (1815, Palma de Mallorca - 1889, Madrid) was a Spanish architect. He worked under the name Alejandro Sureda and is considered "the main populariser of French architectural models amongst the Spanish aristocracy".

== Life ==
He was the son of Bartolomé Sureda y Miserol (1769–1850) and his French wife Thérèse Louise de Sureda. He studied in the Paris studio of Henri Labrouste between 1836 and 1840. After his return to Spain, he was made an architect by the Academia de San Fernando in 1850. From 1851 to 1868 he held the post of deputy royal architect, only losing his post upon the Glorious Revolution. Between 1871 and 1873, he was involved in the works on the Teatro Apolo in Madrid, and between 1874 and 1884 he was chief architect in the redesign of the Museo del Prado, improving the interior and subdividing the Flemish and Spanish rooms. Between 1857 and 1872 he led the restoration of the Castle of Belmonte, Cuenca by Empress Eugenia de Montijo. This is the first example of restoration according to Viollet le Duc's criteria in Spain.

In 1883 he began construction of a palace for the Enrique de Aguilera y Gamboa, marqués de Cerralbo, with later additions such as the belvedere-pavilion in 1891 designed by Luis Cabello Asó and his son Luis Cabello Lapiedra. Better known as the museo Cerralbo, it was declared a Monumento Histórico Artístico in 1962.
