= Symposium (ancient Greece) =

Part of a banquet in Greek and Etruscan art

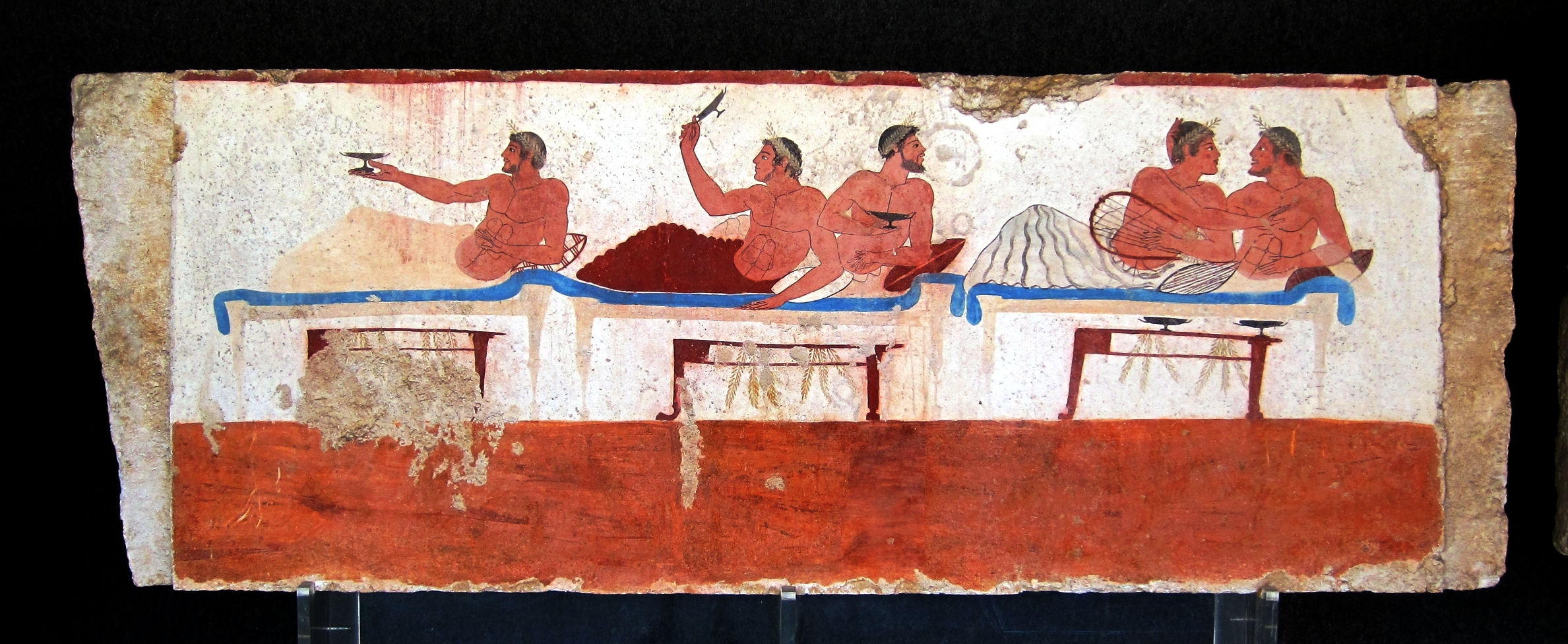
A symposium scene on a fresco in the Tomb of the Diver from the Greek colony of Paestum, in Italy, 480–470 BC

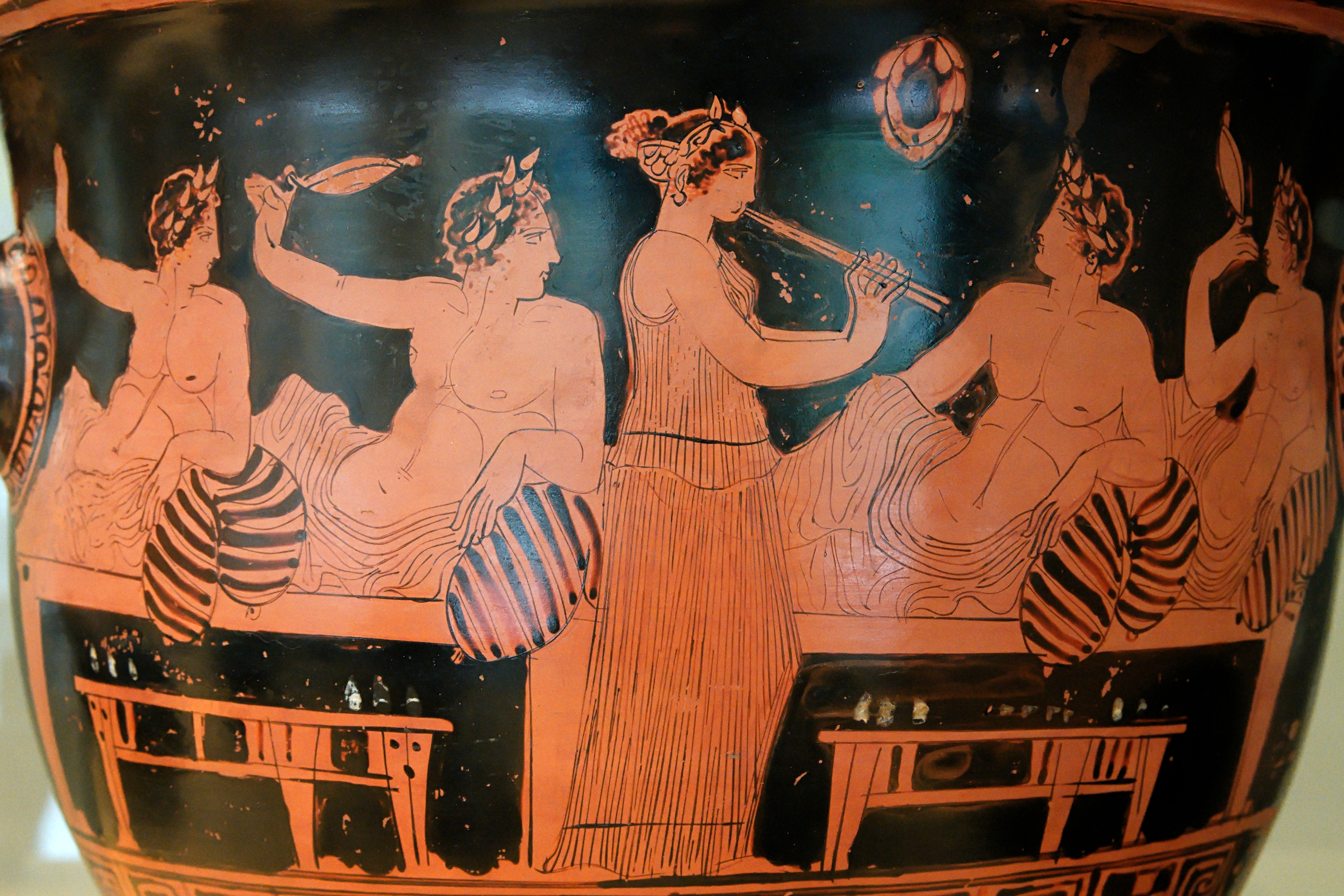
A female aulos-player entertains men at a symposium on this Attic red-figure bell-krater, c. 420 BC.

In Ancient Greece, the symposium (Ancient Greek: συμπόσιον, sympósion, from συμπίνειν, sympínein, 'to drink together') was the part of a banquet that took place after the meal, when drinking for pleasure was accompanied by music, dancing, recitals, or conversation. Literary works that describe or take place at a symposium include two Socratic dialogues, Plato's Symposium and Xenophon's Symposium, as well as a number of Greek poems, such as the elegies of Theognis of Megara. Symposia are depicted in Greek and Etruscan art that shows similar scenes.

In modern usage, it has come to mean an academic conference or meeting, such as a scientific conference. The Latin equivalent of a Greek symposium in Roman society is convivium.

== Setting and social occasion ==
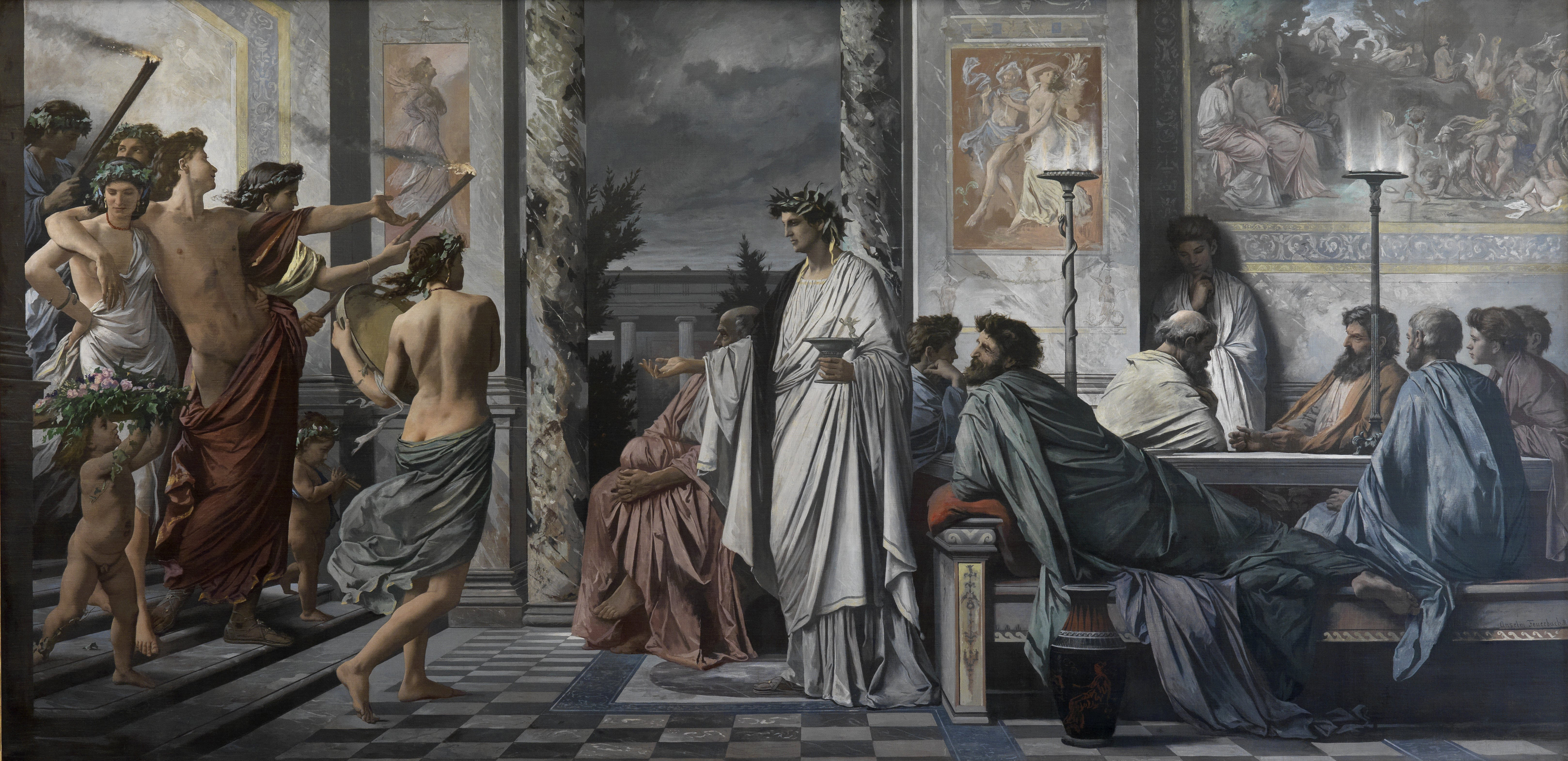
Plato's Symposium, depiction by Anselm Feuerbach

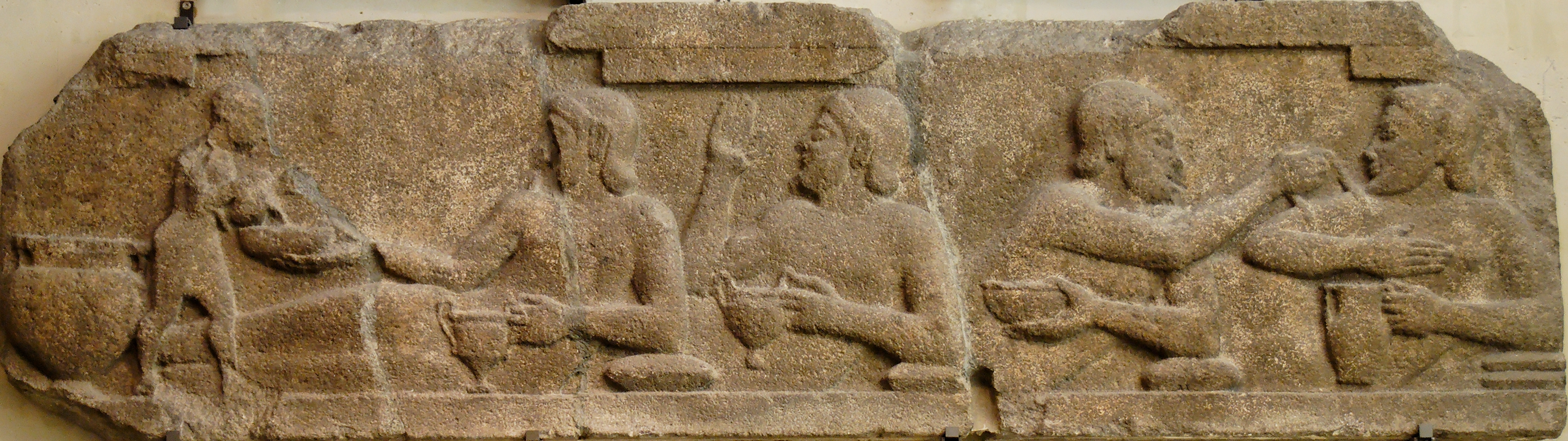
Banquet scene from a Temple of Athena (6th century BC relief)

The Greek symposium was a key Hellenic social institution. It was a forum for the progeny of respected families to debate, plot, boast, or simply to revel with others. They were frequently held to celebrate the introduction of youth into aristocratic society. Symposia were also held by aristocrats to celebrate other special occasions, such as victories in athletic and poetic contests. Many archaic poetic sources were written by members of the social elite communities, and so may not be completely representative of the whole local society.

Symposia were usually held in the andrōn (ἀνδρών), the citizen quarters of the household. The participants, or "symposiasts", would recline on pillowed couches arrayed against the three walls of the room away from the door. Due to space limitations, the couches would number between seven and nine, limiting the total number of participants to somewhere between fourteen and twenty seven (Oswyn Murray gives a figure of between seven and fifteen couches and reckons fourteen to thirty participants a "standard size for a drinking group"). If any young men took part, they did not recline but sat up. However, in Macedonian symposia, the focus was not only on drinking but hunting, and young men were allowed to recline only after they had killed their first wild boar.

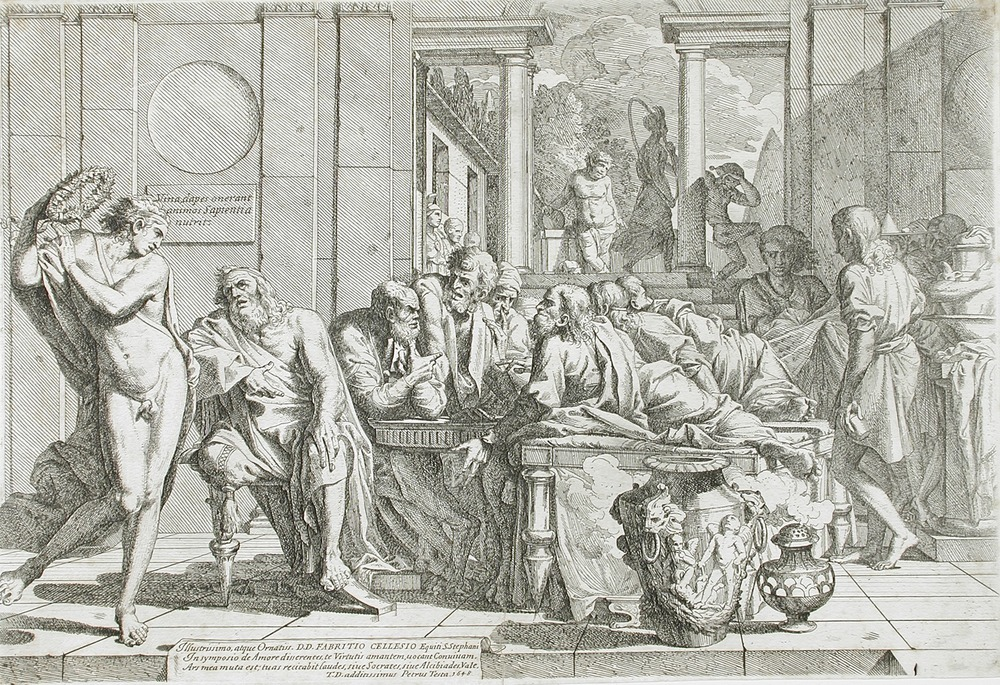
Pietro Testa (1611–1650): the Drunken Alcibiades Interrupting the symposium (1648)

Food and wine were served. Entertainment was provided, and depending on the occasion could include games, songs, flute-girls or boys, slaves performing various acts, and hired entertainment.

Symposia often were held for specific occasions. The most famous symposium of all, described in Plato's dialogue of that name (and rather differently in Xenophon's) was hosted by the poet Agathon on the occasion of his first victory at the theater contest of the 416 BC Dionysia. According to Plato's account, the celebration was upstaged by the unexpected entrance of the toast of the town, the young Alcibiades, dropping in drunken and nearly naked, having just left another symposium.

The men at the symposium would discuss a multitude of topics—often philosophical or political.

== Drinking ==
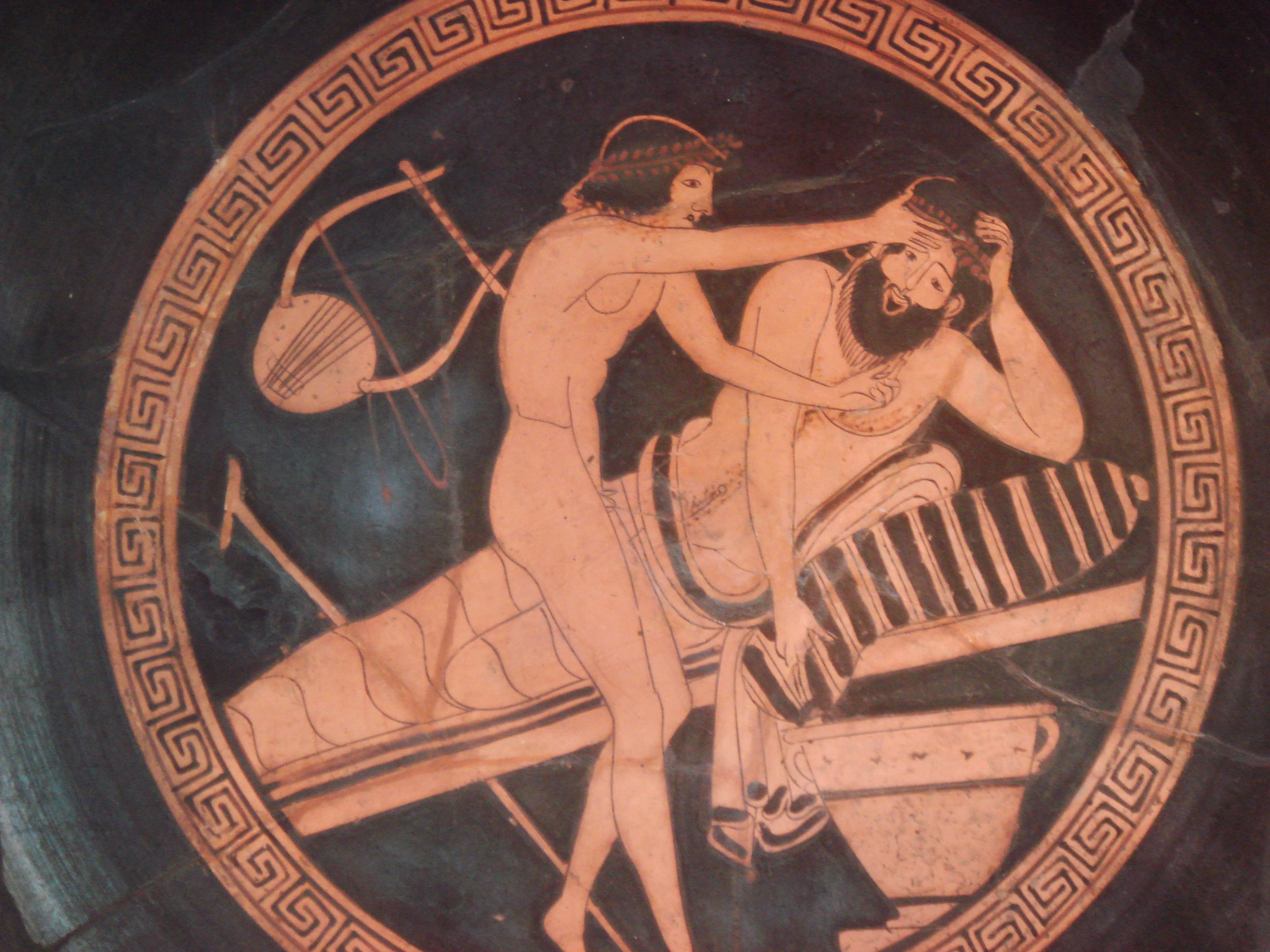
A slave attends to a vomiting symposiast.

A symposium would be overseen by a "symposiarch" (Ancient Greek: συμπόσιάρχης : symposiárchēs) who would decide how strong the wine for the evening would be, depending on whether serious discussions or sensual indulgence were in the offing. The Greeks and Romans customarily served their wine mixed with water, as the drinking of pure wine was considered a habit of uncivilized peoples. However, there were major differences between the Roman and Greek symposia. A Roman symposium (convivium) served wine before, with and after food, and women of status were allowed to join. In a Greek symposium, wine was only drunk after dinner, and women besides entertainers were not allowed to attend.

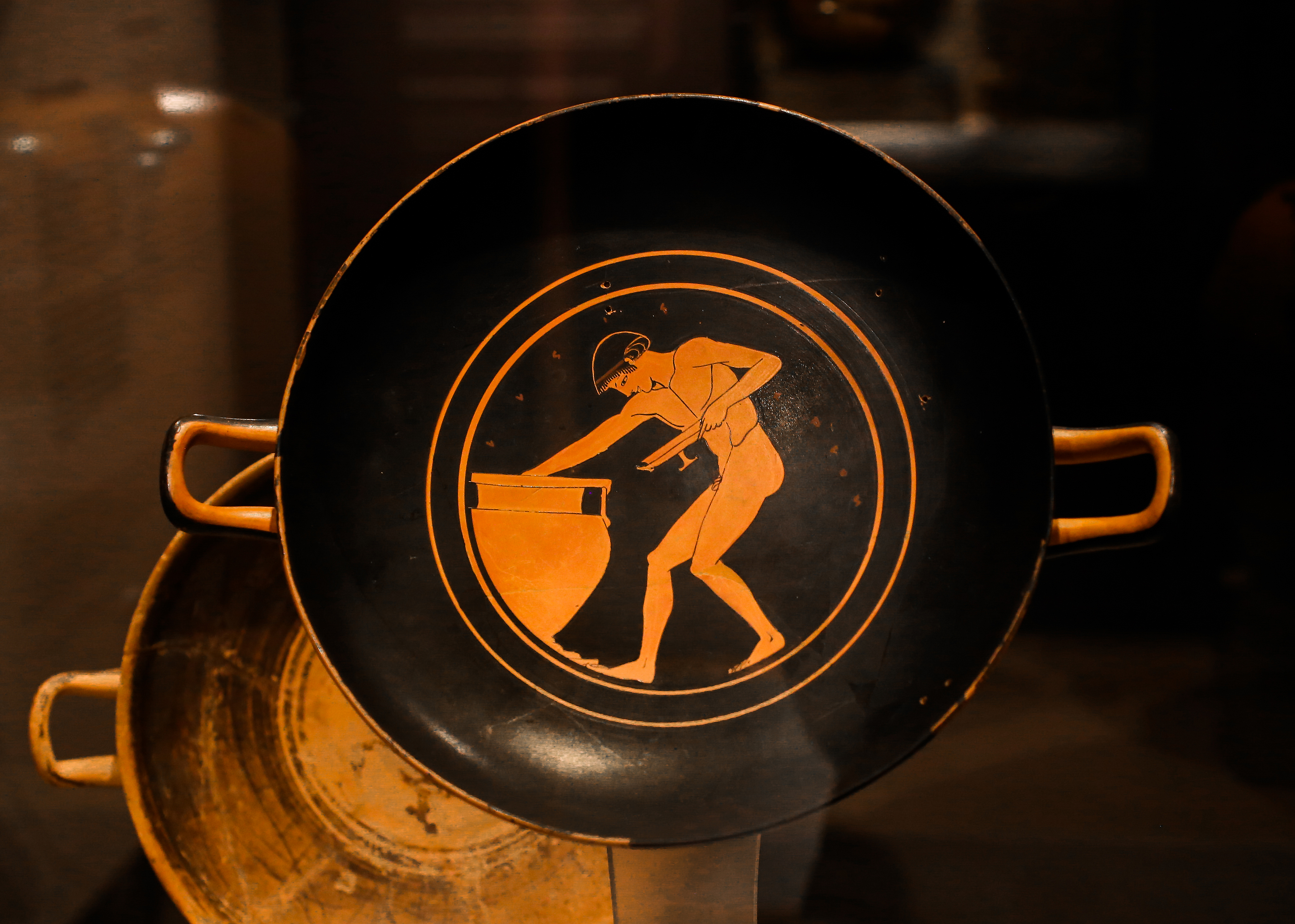
A youth reaches into a krater to replenish his kylix with wine (c. 490–480 BC).

The wine was drawn from a krater, a large jar designed to be carried by two men, and served from pitchers (oenochoe). Determined by the symposiarch, the wine was diluted to a specific strength and was then mixed. Slave boys would manage the krater, and transfer the wine into pitchers. They then attended to each man in the symposium with the pitchers and filled their cups with wine. Certain formalities were observed, most important among which were libations, the pouring of a small amount of wine in honour of various deities or the mourned dead. In a fragment from his c. 375 BC play Semele or Dionysus, Eubulus has the god of wine Dionysos describe proper and improper drinking:

For sensible men I prepare only three kraters: one for health (which they drink first), the second for love and pleasure, and the third for sleep. After the third one is drained, wise men go home. The fourth krater is not mine any more – it belongs to bad behaviour; the fifth is for shouting; the sixth is for rudeness and insults; the seventh is for fights; the eighth is for breaking the furniture; the ninth is for depression; the tenth is for madness and unconsciousness.

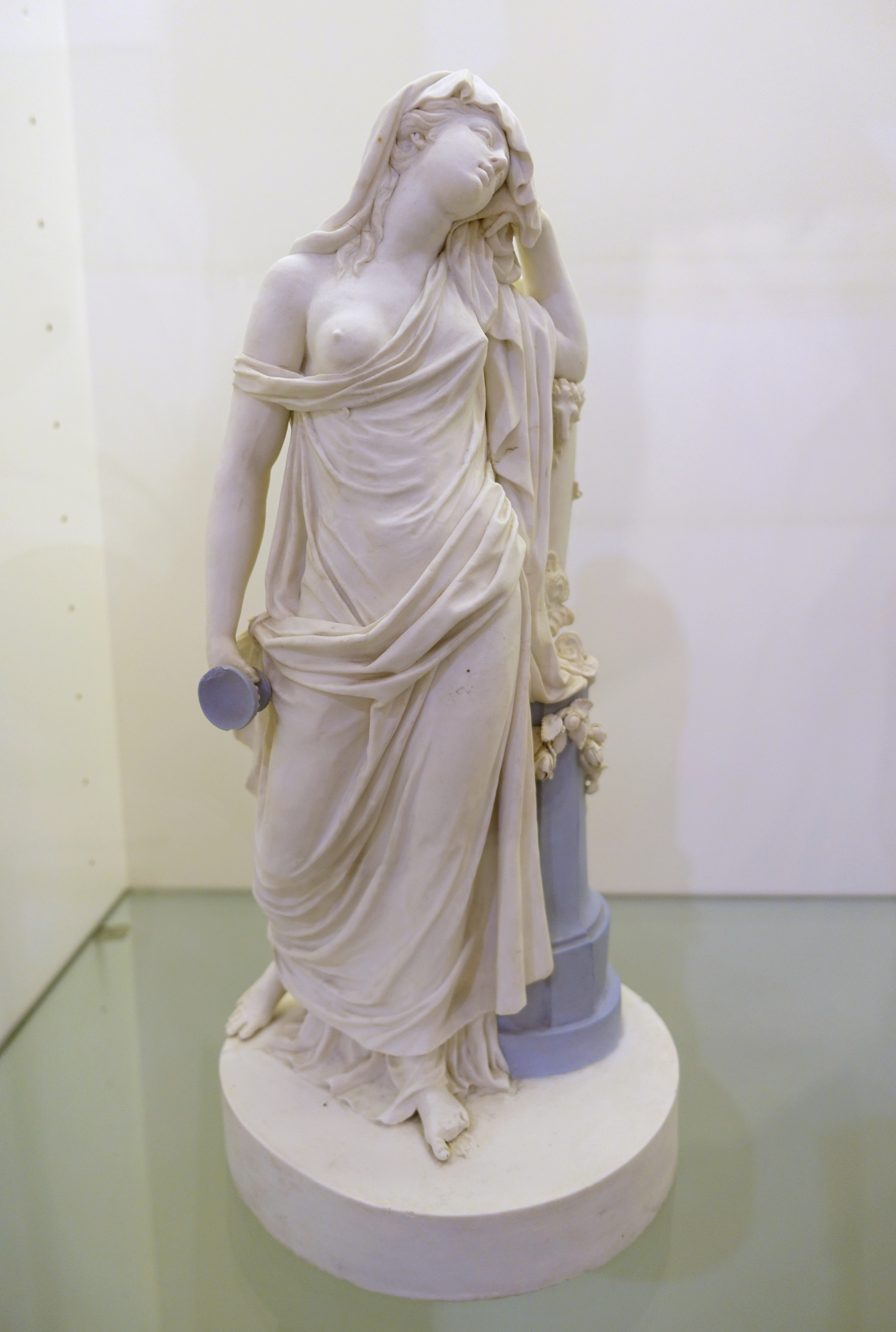
Attendee at a Symposium, biscuit porcelain including the Jasperware blue, Real Fábrica del Buen Retiro, Madrid, 1784-1803

In keeping with the Greek virtue of moderation, the symposiarch should have prevented festivities from getting out of hand, but Greek literature and art often indicate that the third-krater limit was not observed.

== Pottery ==
Symposiums are often featured on Attic pottery and Richard Neer has argued that the chief function of Attic pottery was for use in the symposium. An amphora was used as a jug to hold the wine and usually one single cup was passed amongst the men. Cups used at symposiums were not nearly as intricate as amphoras. Pottery used at symposiums often featured painted scenes of the god Dionysus, satyrs, and other mythical scenes related to drinking and celebration.

== Entertainments ==
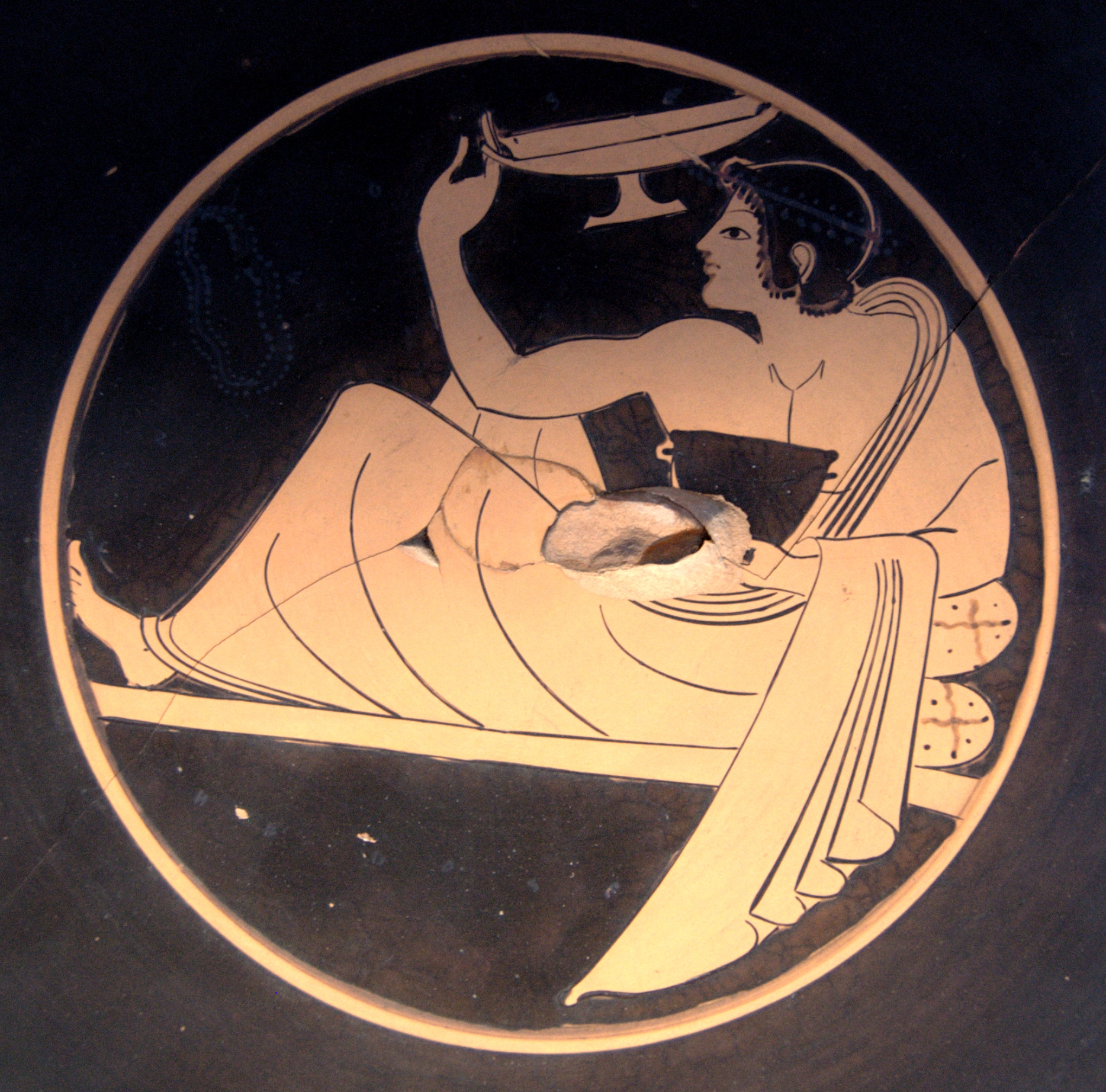
Kottabos player flinging wine-dregs (Attic red-figure kylix, c. 510 BC)

Poetry and music were central to the pleasures of the symposium. Although free women of status did not attend symposia, high-class female prostitutes (hetairai) and entertainers were hired to perform, consort, and converse with the guests. Among the instruments women might play was the aulos, a Greek woodwind instrument sometimes compared to an oboe. When string instruments were played, the barbiton was the traditional instrument. Slaves and boys also provided service and entertainment.

The guests also participated actively in competitive entertainments. A game sometimes played at symposia was kottabos, in which players swirled the dregs of their wine in a kylix, a platter-like stemmed drinking vessel, and flung them at a target. Another feature of the symposia were skolia, drinking songs of a patriotic or bawdy nature, performed competitively with one symposiast reciting the first part of a song and another expected to improvise the end of it. Symposiasts might also compete in rhetorical contests, for which reason the word "symposium" has come to refer in English to any event where multiple speeches are made.

== Etruscan and Roman drinking parties ==
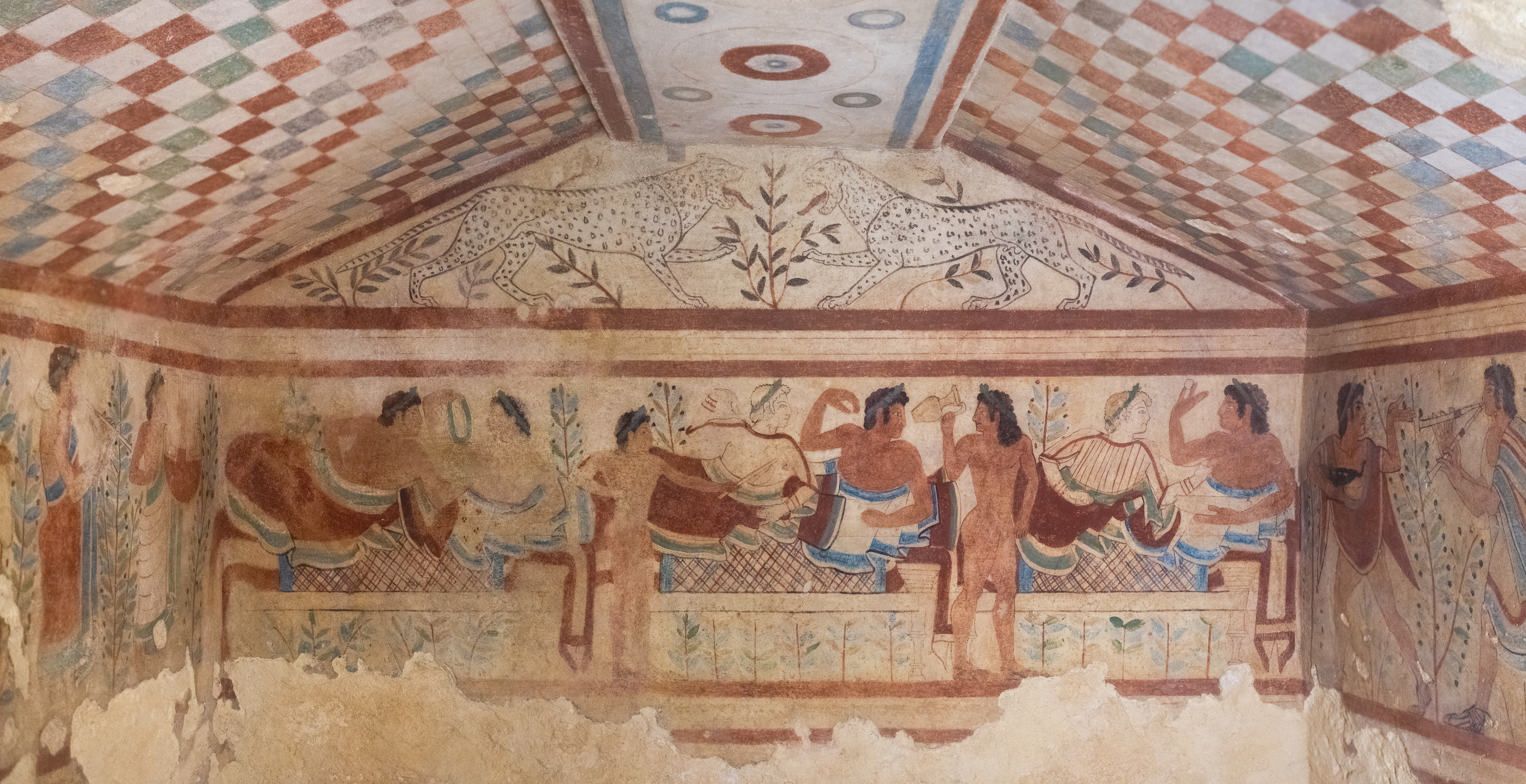
Banqueting scene from the Etruscan Tomb of the Leopards

Etruscan art shows scenes of banqueting that recall aspects of the Greek symposia; however, one major difference is that women of status participated more fully in this as in other realms of Etruscan society. Women were allowed to drink wine and recline with men at feasts. Some Etruscan women were even considered "expert drinkers". Additionally, Etruscan women were often buried with drinking and feasting paraphernalia, suggesting that they partook in these activities. The most apparent distinctions between Greek and Etruscan drinking parties appear in Etruscan art. Etruscan paintings show men and women drinking wine together and reclining on the same cushions. The Sarcophagus of the Spouses, found in the Etruscan region dating to 520–530 BC, depicts a man and women lounging together in the context of a banquet, which is a stark contrast with gendered Greek drinking parties.

As with many other Greek customs, the aesthetic framework of the symposium was adopted by the Romans under the name of comissatio. These revels also involved the drinking of assigned quantities of wine, and the oversight of a master of the ceremonies appointed for the occasion from among the guests. Another Roman version of the symposium was the convivium. Women's roles differed in Roman symposia as well. Roman women were legally prohibited from drinking wine as a matter of public morality. Men were expected to control their own wine consumption, but women were not given this authority.
