= Biscuit porcelain =

Unglazed white porcelain

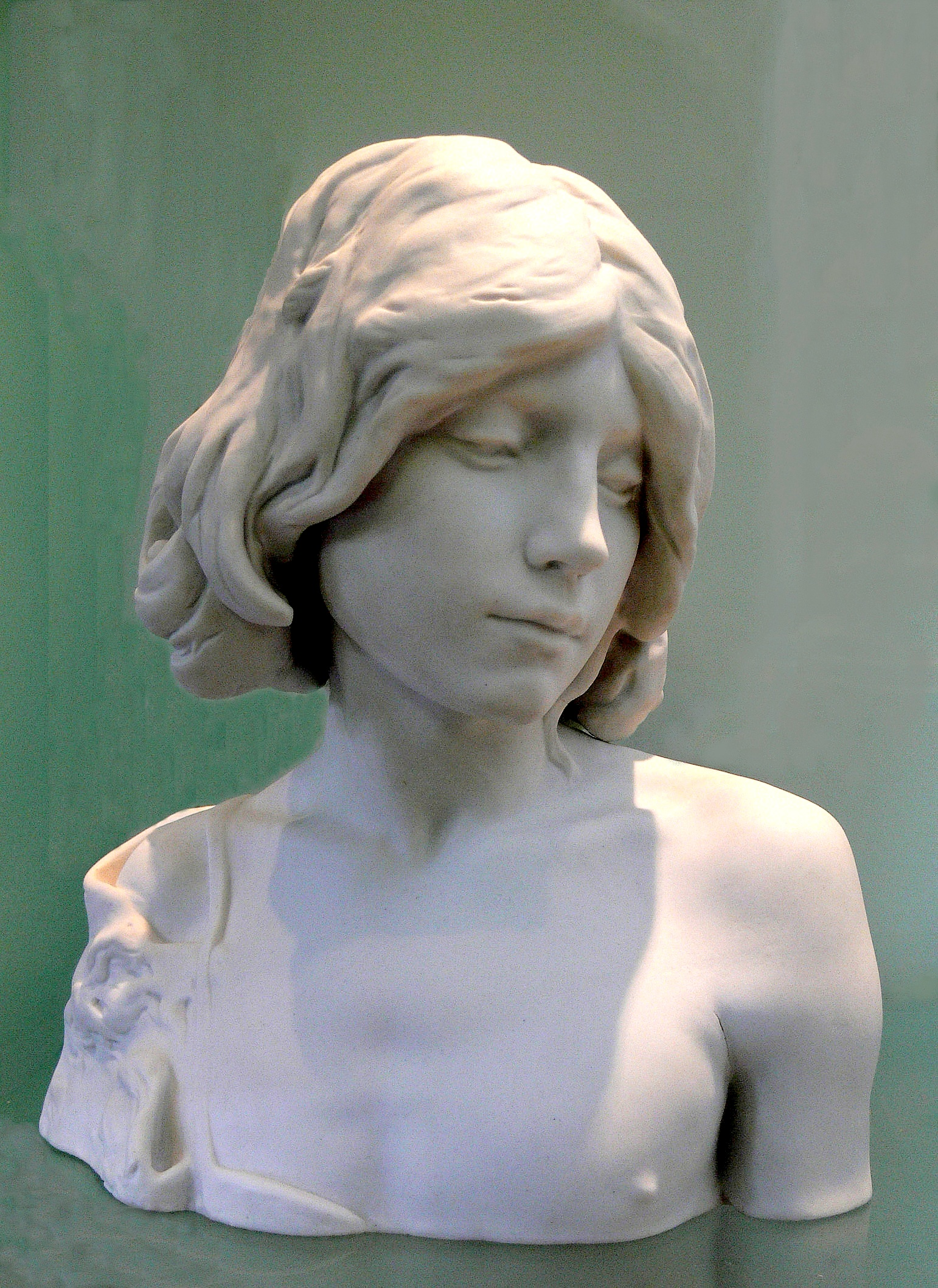
Bisque bust of 1883, representing the young John the Baptist

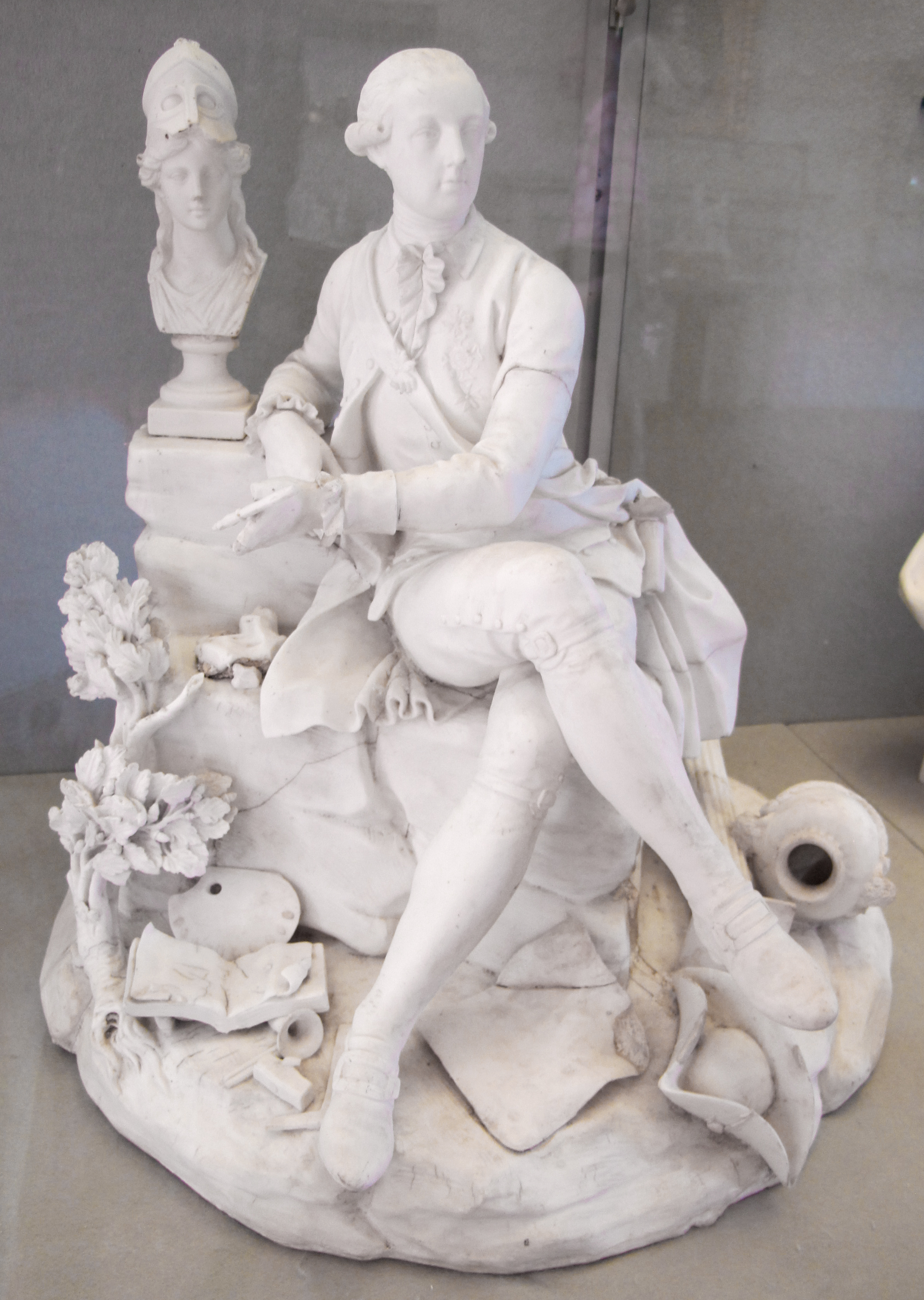
Vienna porcelain figure of Joseph II of Austria, c. 1790

Biscuit porcelain, bisque porcelain or bisque is unglazed, white porcelain treated as a final product, with a matte appearance and texture to the touch. It has been widely used in European pottery, mainly for sculptural and decorative objects that are not tableware and so do not need a glaze for protection.

The term "biscuit" refers to any type of fired but unglazed pottery in the course of manufacture, but only in porcelain is biscuit or bisque a term for a final product. Unglazed earthenware as a final product is often called terracotta, and in stoneware equivalent unglazed wares (such as jasperware) are often called "dry-bodied". Many types of pottery, including most porcelain wares, have a glaze applied, either before a single firing, or at the biscuit stage, with a further firing.

Small figurines and other decorative pieces have often been made in biscuit, as well as larger portrait busts and other sculptures; the appearance of biscuit is very similar to that of carved and smoothed marble, the traditional prestige material for sculpture in the West. It is hardly used in Chinese porcelain or that of other East Asian countries, but in Europe became very popular for figures in the second half of the 18th century, as Neoclassicism dominated contemporary styles. It was first used at Vincennes porcelain in 1751 by Jean-Jacques Bachelier.

Biscuit figures have to be free from the common small imperfections that a glaze and painted decoration could cover up, and were therefore usually more expensive than glazed ones. They are also more difficult to keep clean.

A popular use for biscuit porcelain was the manufacture of bisque dolls in the 19th century, where the porcelain was typically tinted or painted in flesh tones. In the doll world, "bisque" is usually the term used, rather than "biscuit". Parian ware is a 19th-century advance on the biscuit technique. Lithophanes were normally made with biscuit.

== Colour ==
Biscuit is most often white, but it is possible to use colored biscuit.

Jasperware, developed by Wedgwood in the 1770s and soon very popular all over Europe, is usually classed as stoneware rather than porcelain, but the style of using two contrasting colours of biscuit was sometimes used in porcelain. The Real Fábrica del Buen Retiro in Madrid made a porcelain room in the Casita del Principe, El Escorial decorated with 234 plaques in the style, with a "Wedgwood blue" ground and the design in white biscuit porcelain in low relief. These were applied as sprigs, meaning that they made separately as thin pieces, and stuck to the main blue body before firing. The plaques are framed like paintings; they were made between 1790 and 1795. The figure by the same factory illustrated here uses elements modelled in a coloured paste, and is all biscuit.

Biscuit porcelain could also be painted with unfired paint rather than the enamels normal overglaze decoration uses, the lack of a shiny surface giving a strikingly different effect in the best examples. This rare technique is called "coloured biscuit", and is found from the 19th century onwards. As with 18th-century pieces painted over the glaze, the paint may peel if not well looked after.

A piece could be made with some areas left as biscuit while others are glazed and enamelled in the usual way. A Chelsea-Derby figure of George III leaning on a classical plinth and standing on a high base has only the figure in biscuit.

This part-glazing also occurs in other types of pottery, and for example is very common in the earthenware Chinese Tang dynasty tomb figures. Other pieces "reserve" areas in biscuit, by giving them a temporary coating of wax or something similar to keep the glaze off; this is a fairly common feature of Longquan celadon (which is porcelain in Chinese terms), and also found in Ming dragons. Some Chinese pieces are described as "porcelain with polychrome enamels on the biscuit" – that is, using the normal "overglaze" technique on biscuit, but with no actual glaze, often a revivalist style evoking earlier sancai wares (which were not in porcelain).

The laborious and mostly 19th-century pâte-sur-pâte technique often uses biscuit for at least one of the colours.

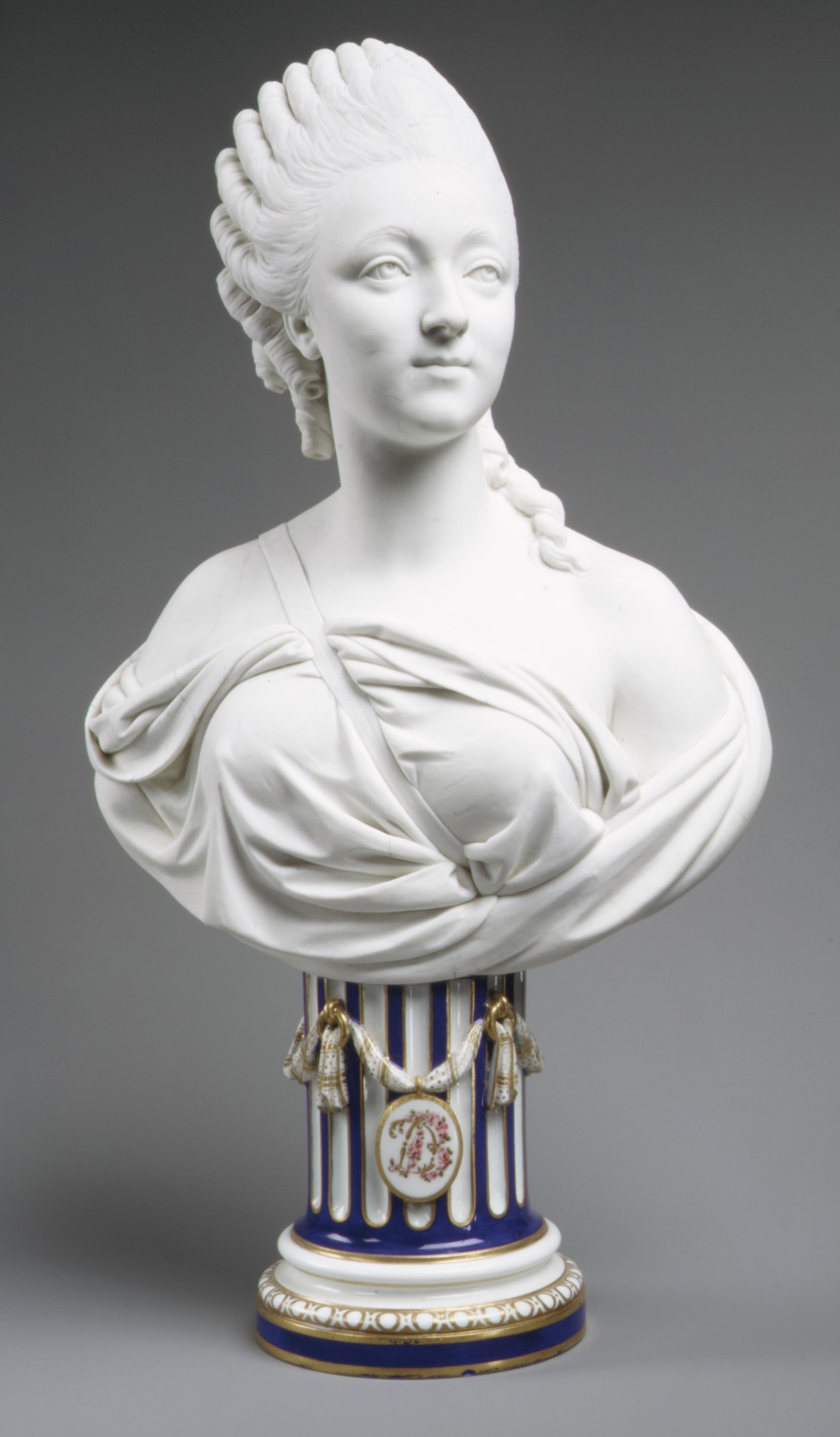
Madame du Barry, the bust in biscuit, the pedestal glazed, enamelled and gilt. Sèvres porcelain, 1772.

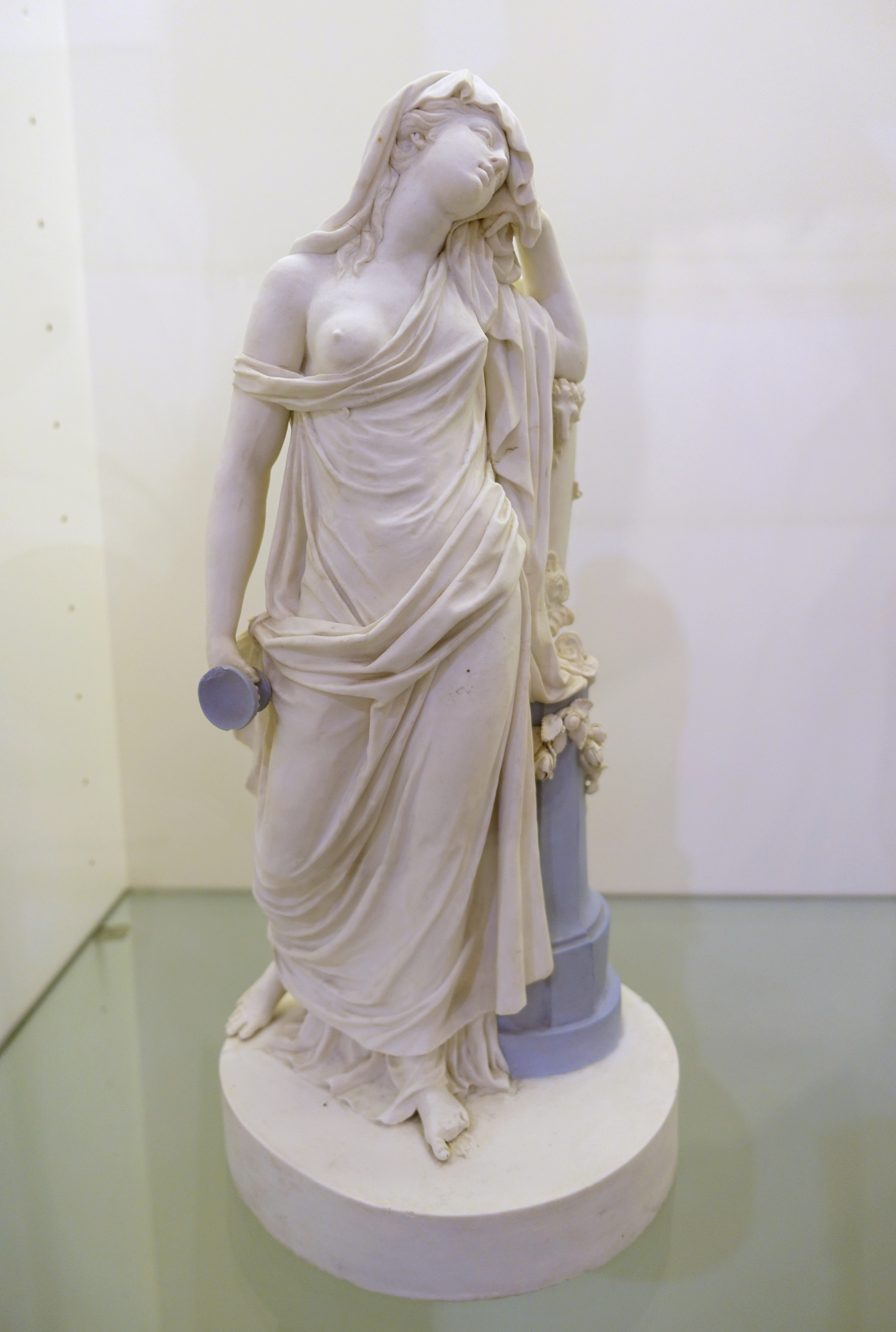
Attendee at a symposium, all in biscuit porcelain including the Jasperware blue, Real Fábrica del Buen Retiro, Madrid, 1784–1803

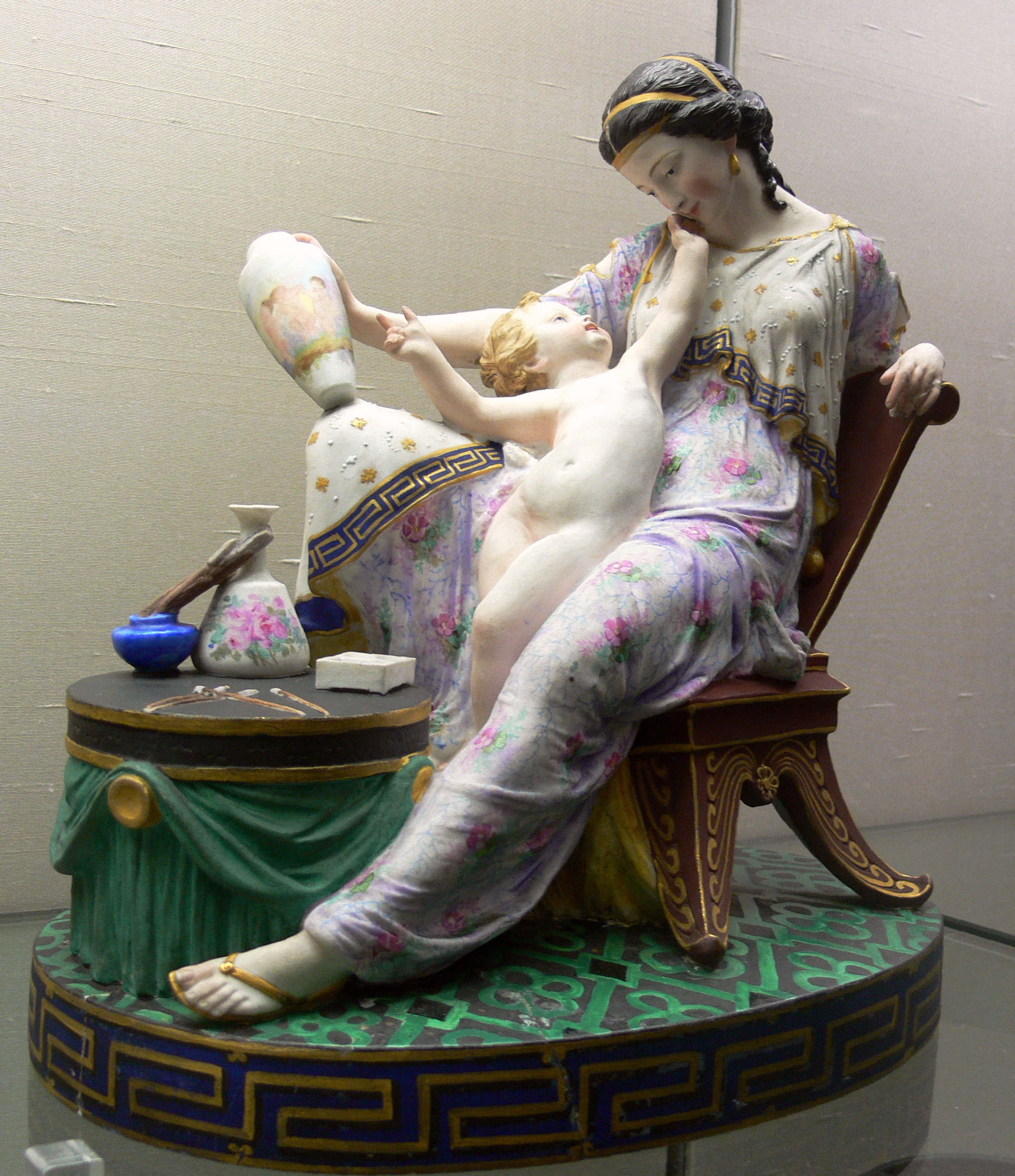
The porcelain painter, Paris, c. 1875. Biscuit porcelain with unfired paint.

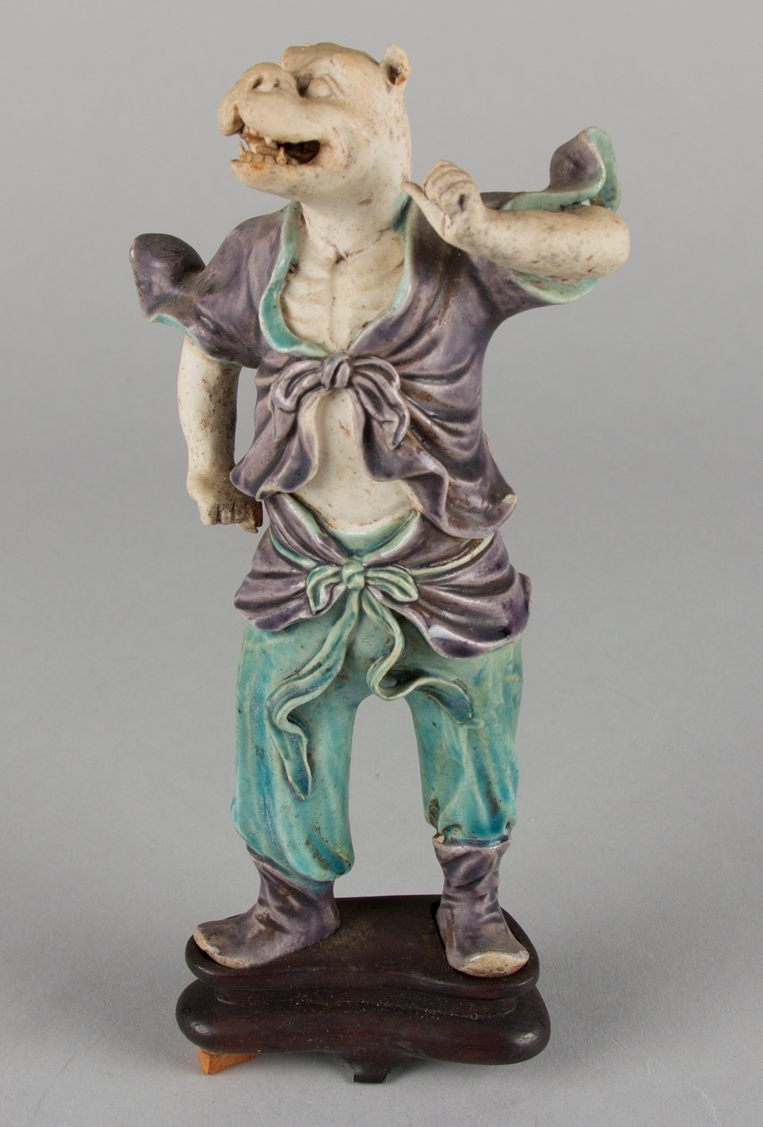
Qing dynasty Chinese zodiac figure, part biscuit, part coloured glazes
