= Real Fábrica del Buen Retiro =

Spanish porcelain factory

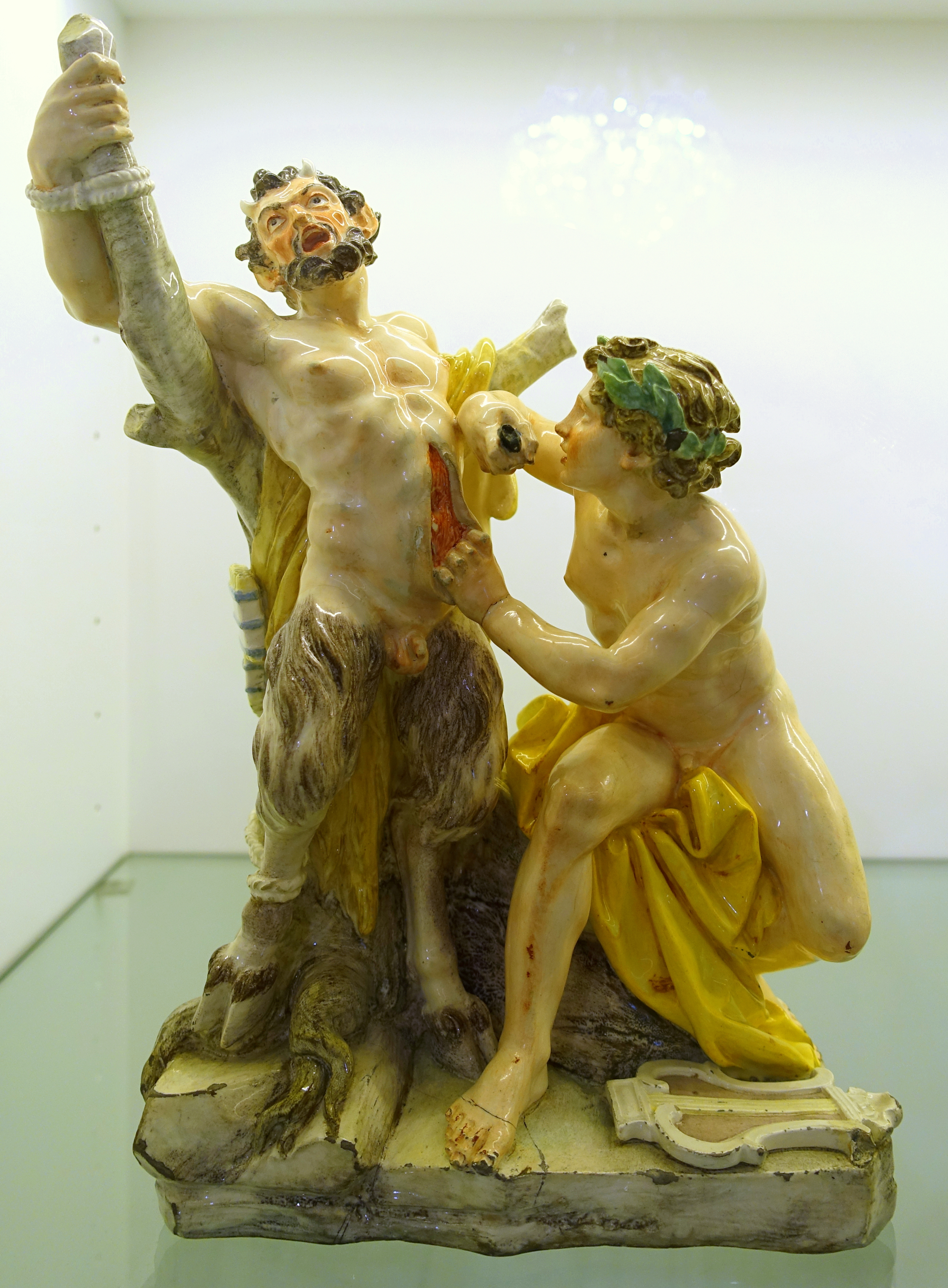
Apollo and Marsyas, 1760s.

Real Fábrica del Buen Retiro (popularly called La China; "Royal Buen Retiro Porcelain Factory"; alternatively, Real Fábrica de Porcelana del Buen Retiro) was a porcelain manufacturing factory in Spain, owned by the King of Spain. It was located in Madrid's Parque del Buen Retiro, Madrid on a site near the Fuente del Ángel Caído, and operated between 1760 and 1817, when it moved location and changed its name.

The factory, built by Afro-Spaniard architect Antonio Carlos de Borbón, began by moving the Capodimonte porcelain factory from Naples in 1760, after its founder there had inherited the Spanish throne as Carlos III of Spain. He took the equipment and about 40 key workers, including Giuseppe Gricci (c. 1700–1770), the main modeller, and nearly five tons of porcelain paste. Since the paste, the main artists, and the fleur-de-lys factory mark, were all used by both factories, distinguishing between their products from the years around the move can be very difficult. The factory continued to make soft paste porcelain until 1803, when it switched to hard-paste porcelain; some pieces made were in fact creamware, an English style of fine earthenware.

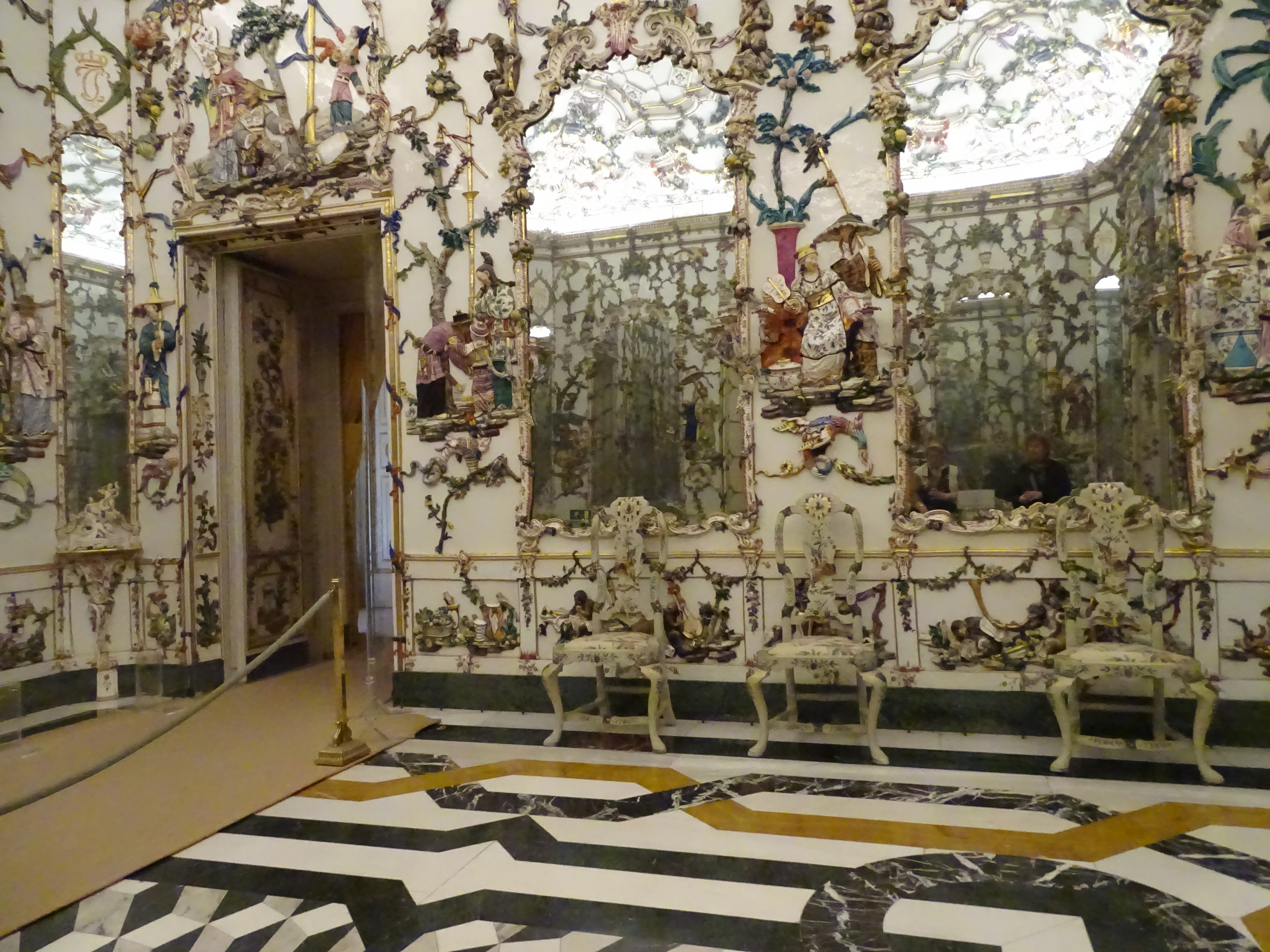
Porcelain room in the Palace of Aranjuez, by Gricci, 1763-1765

The factory concentrated on figurines, especially of classical subjects, but also made tablewares and decorative vessels such as vases and pots. Porcelain rooms were installed at three royal palaces. Initially Gricci's style remained similar to the elegant Rococo of his Naples works, but soon the newly-fashionable Neoclassicism became dominant, which remained the case throughout the life of the factory.

The building was damaged in the Napoleonic Wars, and in 1817 production was moved a short distance across Madrid, the enterprise becoming the Royal Factory of La Moncloa, again taking such moulds and equipment as survived, and the employees. This operated until 1849.

== Porcelain rooms ==
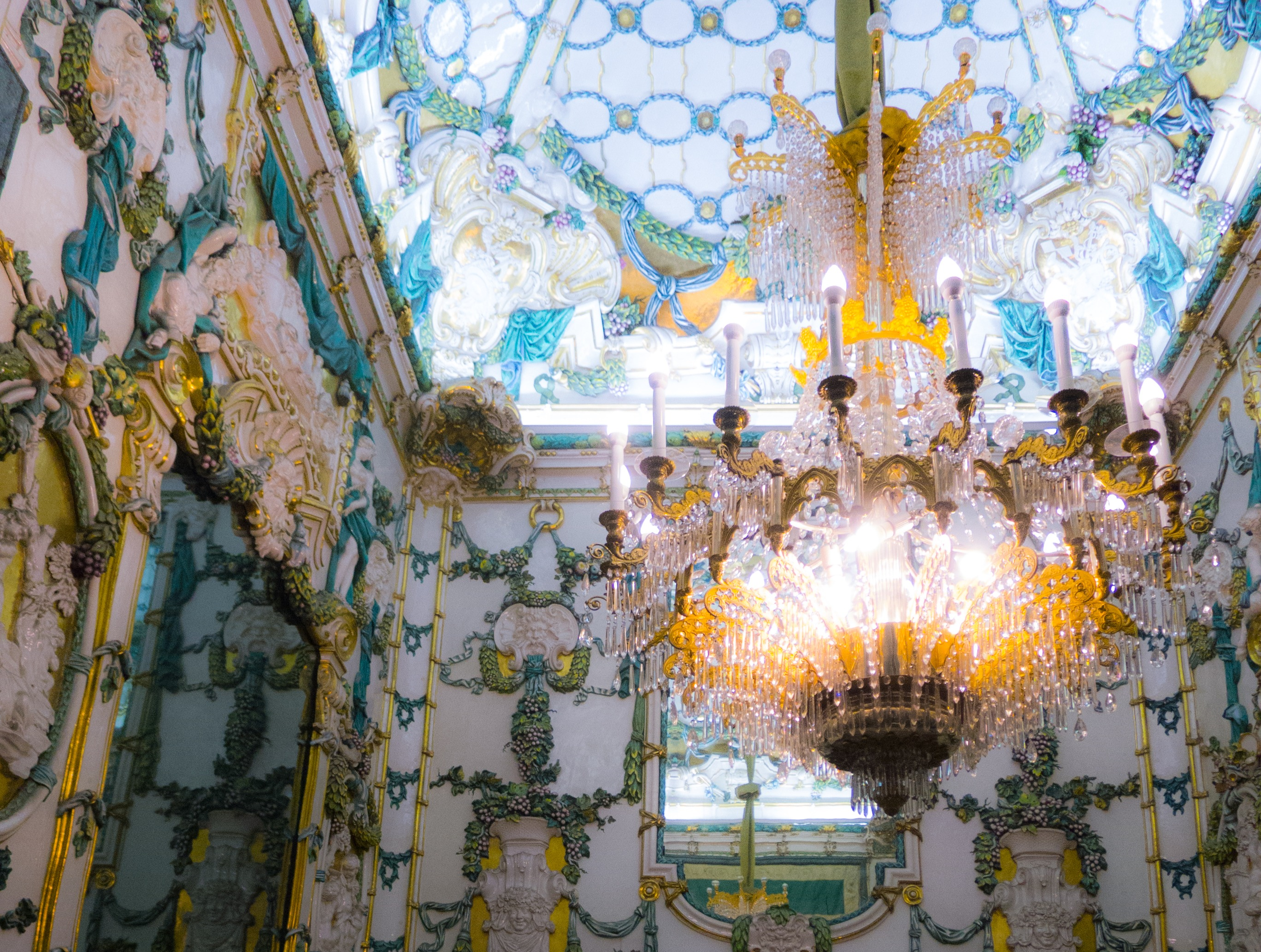
Porcelain room in the Palacio Real, Madrid, designed by Carlo Schepers in the 1770s

Gricci had made a chinoiserie porcelain room, the Porcelain boudoir of Maria Amalia of Saxony, at the Palace of Portici near Naples (now moved to the Palace of Capodimonte), and was soon asked to make another one at the Palace of Aranjuez, which he made and installed between 1763 and 1765, at a cost of 571,555 Spanish reales. The factory made another room, rather smaller and in a Neoclassical style, for the main Palacio Real, Madrid. This was designed by Carlo Schepers in the 1770s, and cost 256,958 reales. Both these had walls largely of plain white plaques, over which lay a network of coloured elements in a medium to high relief, made up of plant motifs and figures.

The room at the small Casita del Principe, El Escorial was again Neoclassical, but with a very different appearance. The walls were almost entirely covered by 234 plaques in the style and technique of Wedgwood's jasperware, with a "Wedgwood blue" ground and the design in white biscuit porcelain in low relief. These were applied as sprigs, meaning that they were made separately as thin pieces, and stuck to the main blue body before firing. The plaques are framed like paintings; they were made between 1790 and 1795.

== History ==
=== 18th century ===
The factory was founded in 1760 on a site in the Buen Retiro park which at that time was the private gardens of a royal palace on the outskirts of Madrid. It was an initiative of Carlos III of Spain, who succeeded to the Spanish throne in 1759, and his wife, Maria Amalia of Saxony, designed and built by his architect Antonio Carlos de Borbón.

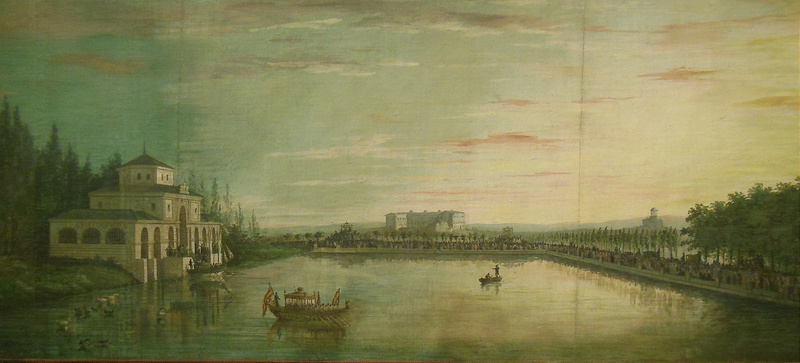
The factory in the Buen Retiro Park, centre, beyond the lake

Prior to becoming King of Spain, Charles reigned as King of Naples and Sicily. A similar factory, the Porcellana di Capodimonte, had been established by the royal couple in Naples. Maria Amalia died in 1760, a year after moving to Madrid with her husband, but she was an important influence on both the Naples and the Madrid factories. 53 specialized Italian craftsmen from Naples came to Madrid, along with three shipments containing the necessary equipment and special paste, to establish a factory to produce royal porcelain in Madrid. Gaetano Schepers was in charge of the factory and ten Spanish artists were also associated with the manufacturing. The porcelain's quality was internationally recognized, and its manufacturing techniques were kept a state secret. Buen Retiro porcelain was one of the products that drove mercantilist royal policy during the Spanish Age of Enlightenment. There were other factories in the Madrid area producing luxuries such as tapestries, glass etc.

=== 19th century ===
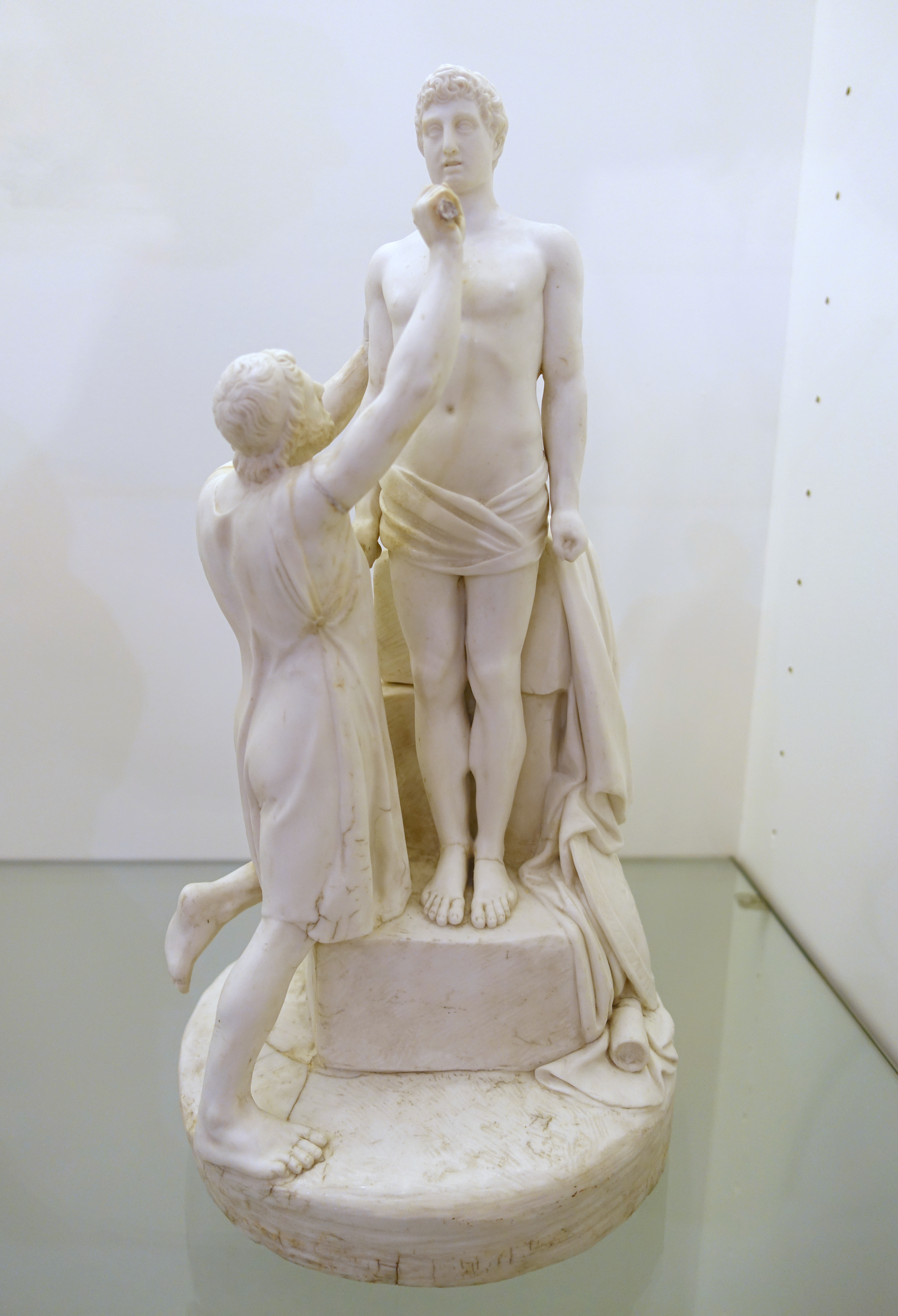
Prometheus modelling Man from clay, by Esteban de Ágreda, biscuit porcelain, 1803-1808.

The year 1803 marked a transition in the factory management from the Italian board of directors to the Spanish-born Bartolome Sureda y Miserol. During his career, Sureda directed several royal factories, including the Real Fábrica de Paños in Guadalajara, the Real Fábrica de Loza de la Moncloa, and the Real Fábrica de Cristales de La Granja.

The occupying French forces were driven out of Madrid in 1812, during the Peninsular War, and the park became the scene of intense fighting. The factory building was fortified by the French, and attacked by the British. Wellington, who was threatened with a counter-offensive, gave orders to burn the building and the factory ceased production. It has been suggested that the decision to destroy the factory was influenced by commercial rivalry as well as its strategic importance.

In 1817, the factory was re-established on a new site in Madrid, becoming the Royal Factory of La Moncloa, founded by Ferdinand VII, who moved the Buen Retiro workshops and warehouses to La Moncloa. Sureda became director again in 1821. All of the employees of the destroyed factory were re-employed in the new one.

== Collections ==
Apart from the porcelain rooms, covered above, a fine collection of porcelain from the factory is on display in the Museo de Historia de Madrid. The Museo Nacional de Artes Decorativas has a display, and some pieces are shown in the Museo del Prado. Several other European and American museums display pieces.

== Gallery ==
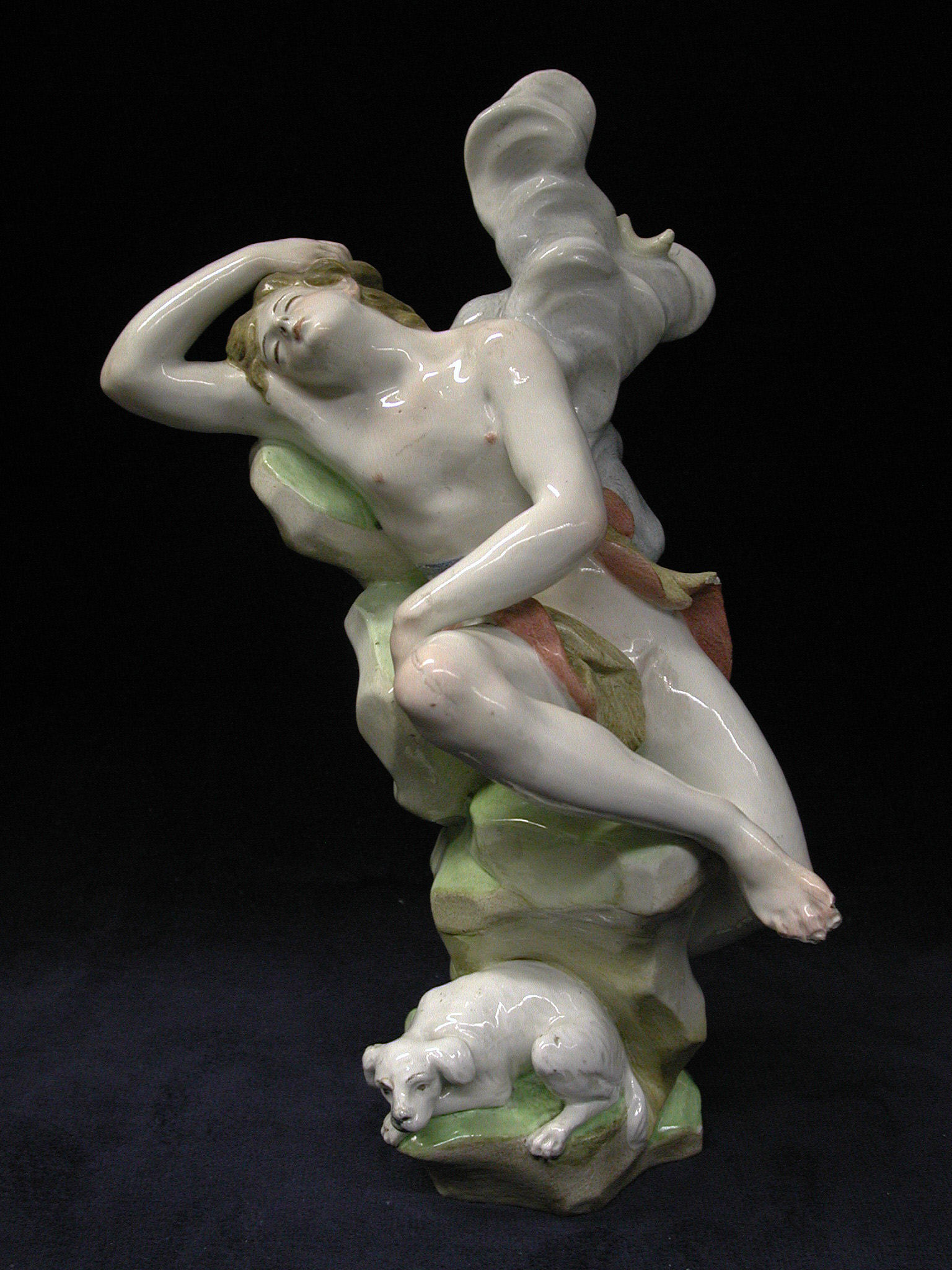
Endymion, 1760s

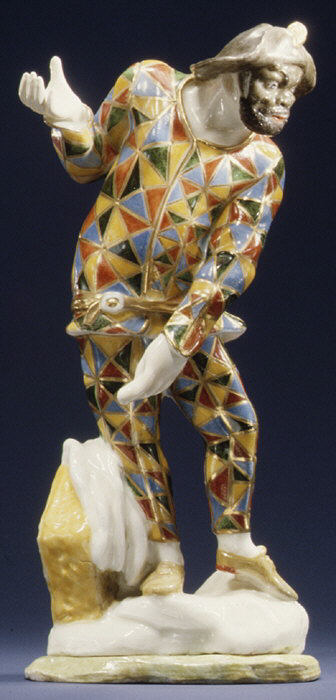
Harlequin, 1760s

Writing set, 1760s or 1770s

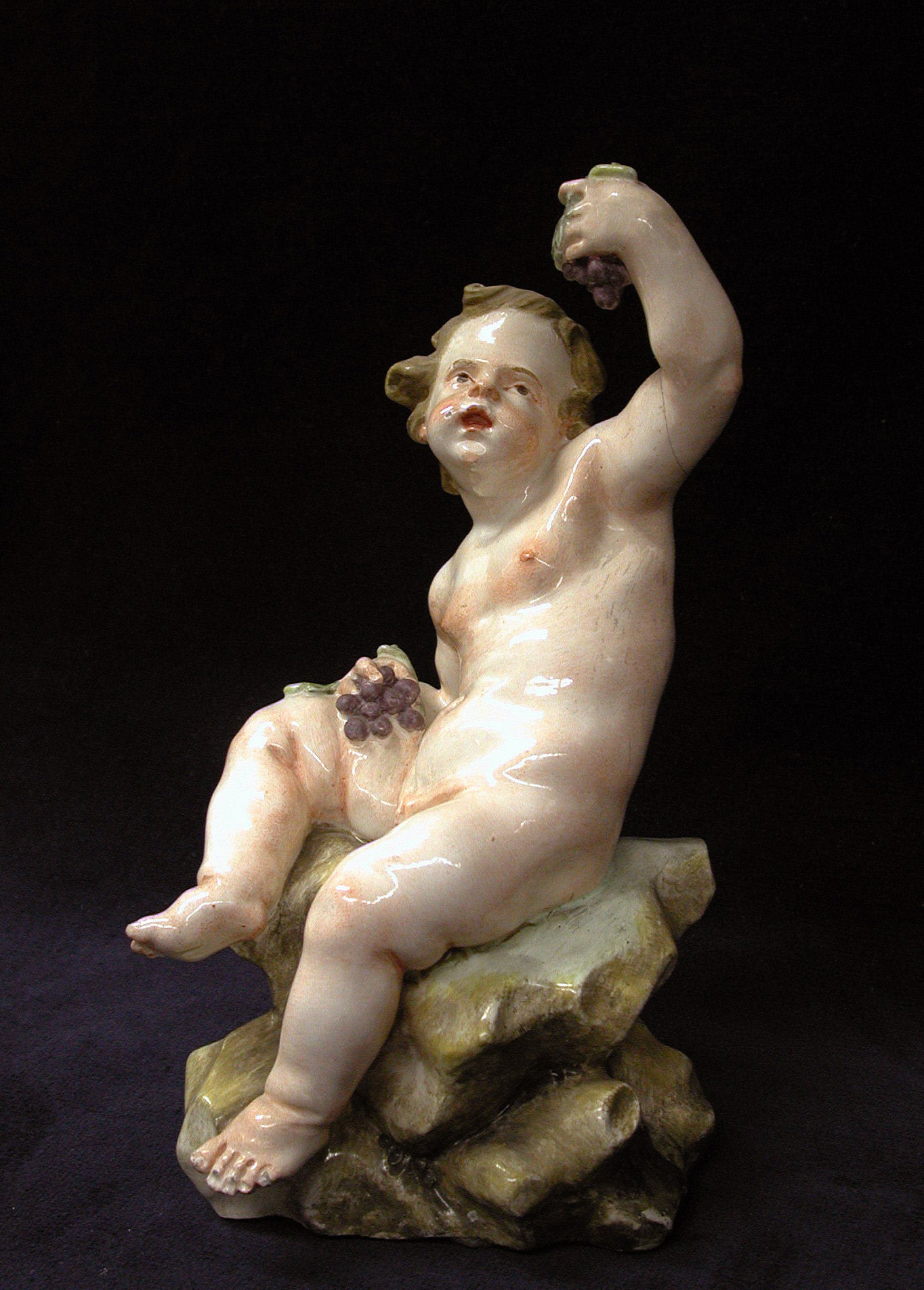
Child with grapes, 1770s

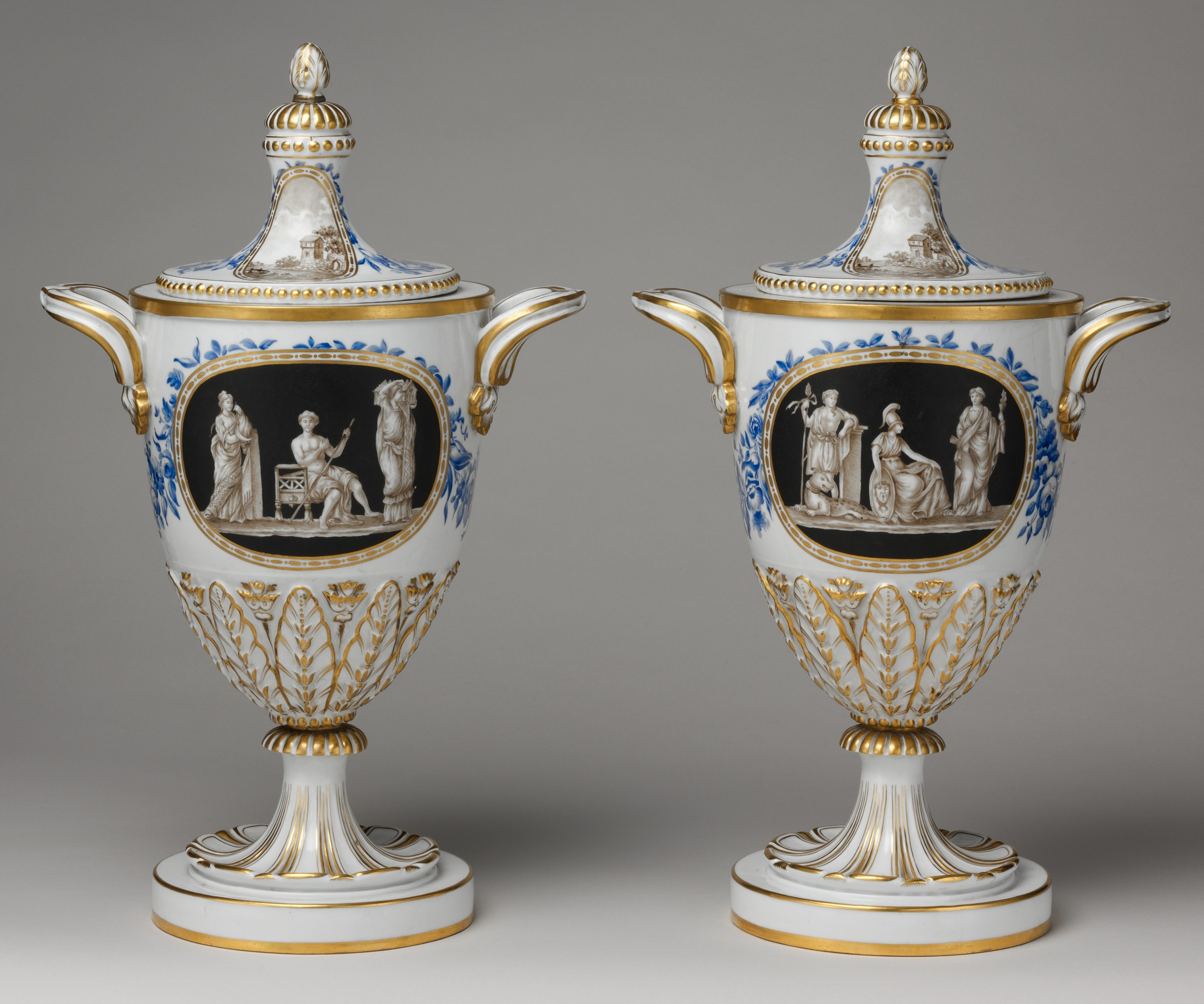
Neoclassical covered vases, between 1784 and 1795, 18 3/4 in. (47.6 cm) high.

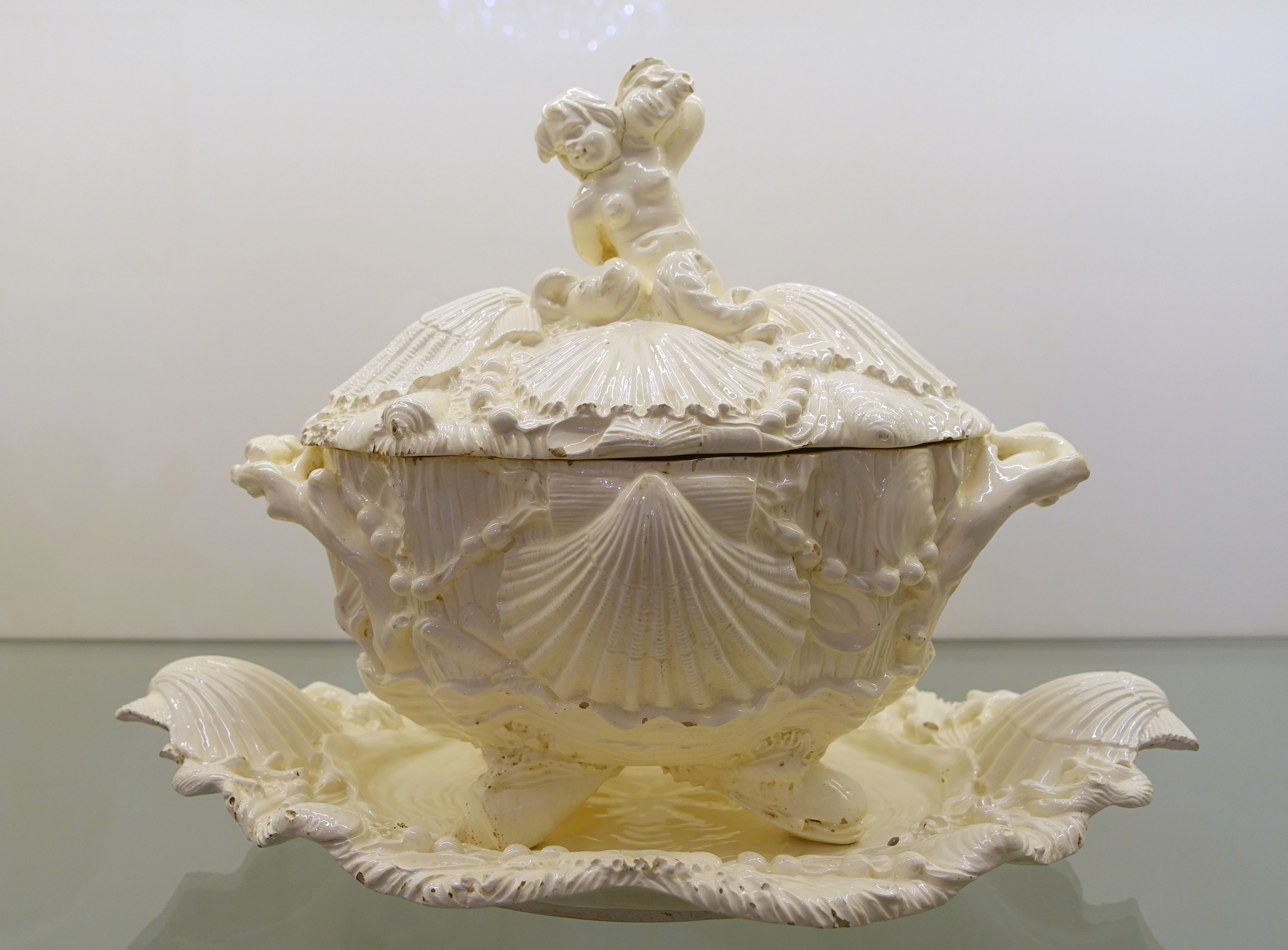
Tureen with sealife, 1771-1784

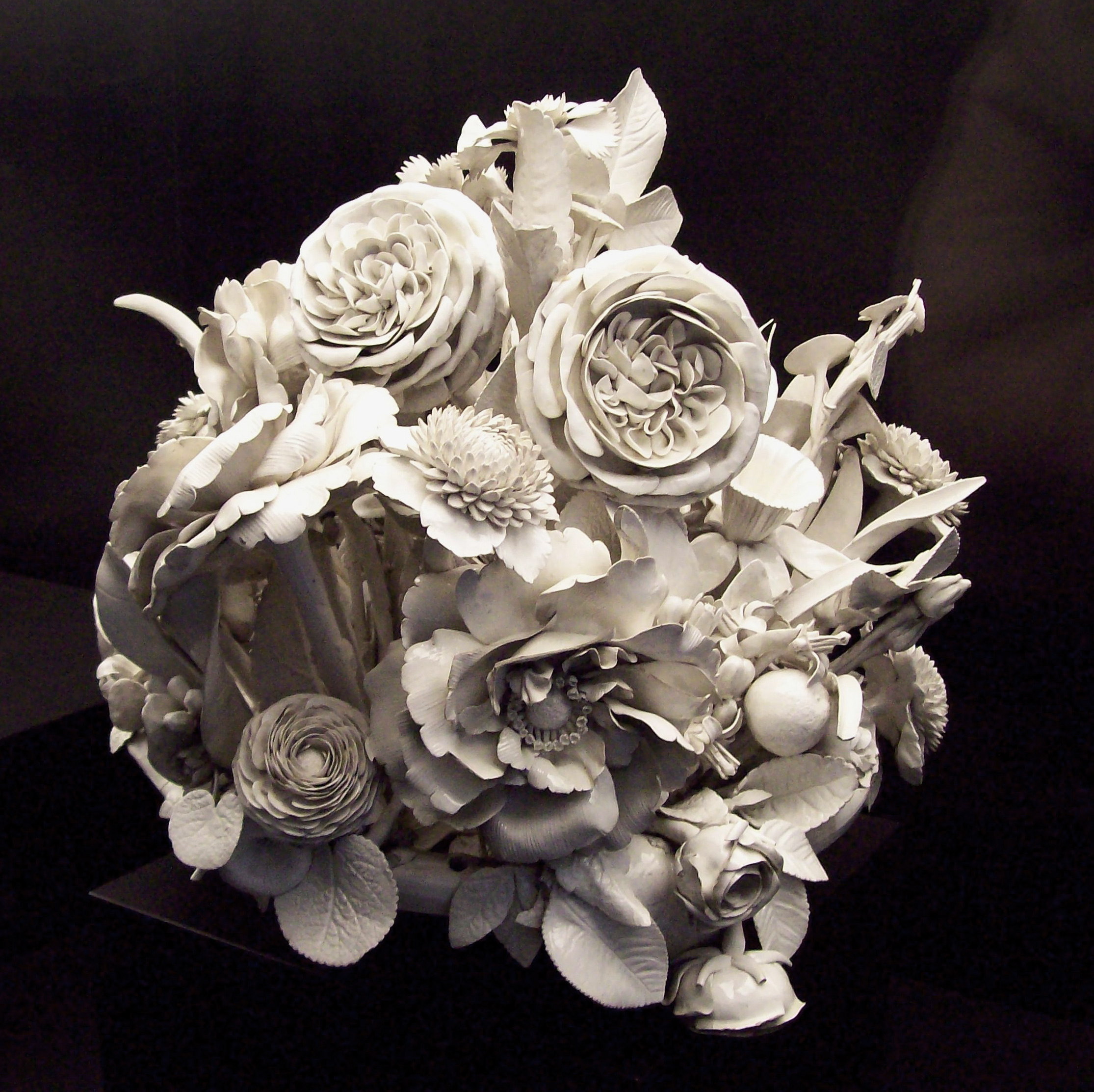
Bouquet of flowers, before 1783

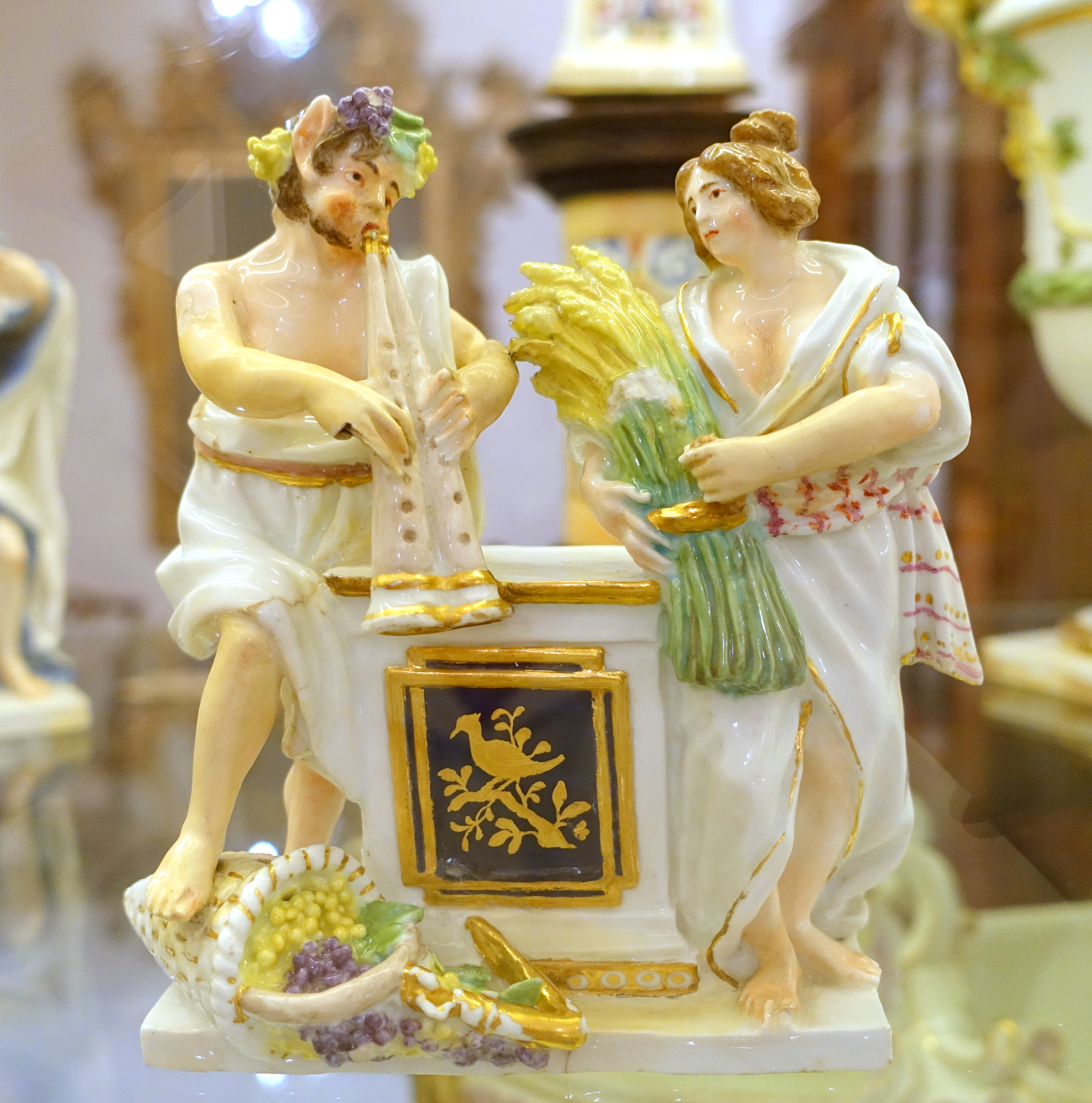
Pan and Ceres, 1790-1795

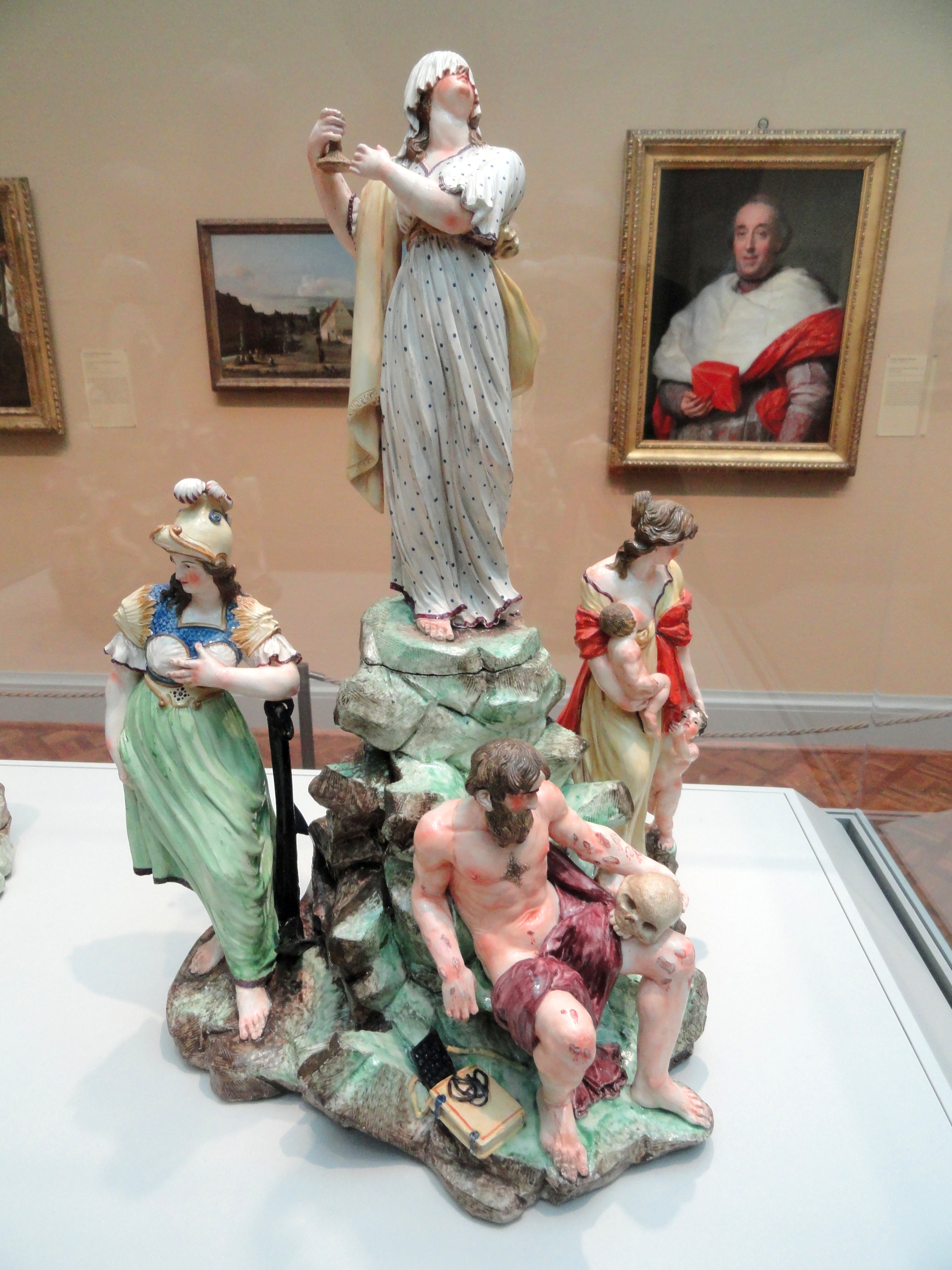
One of a pair of Allegorical Figure Groups of the Arts and Virtues

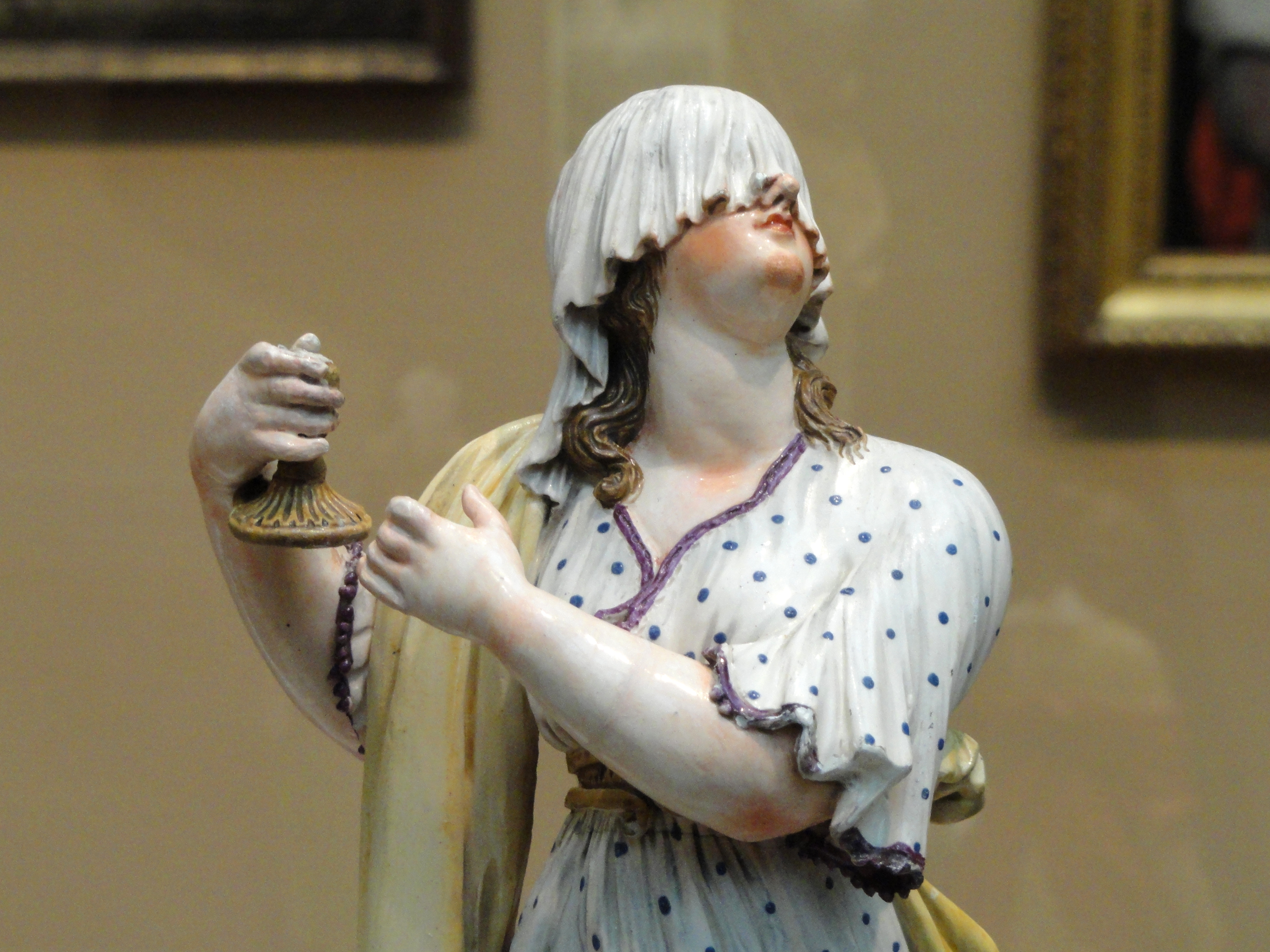
Detail of last

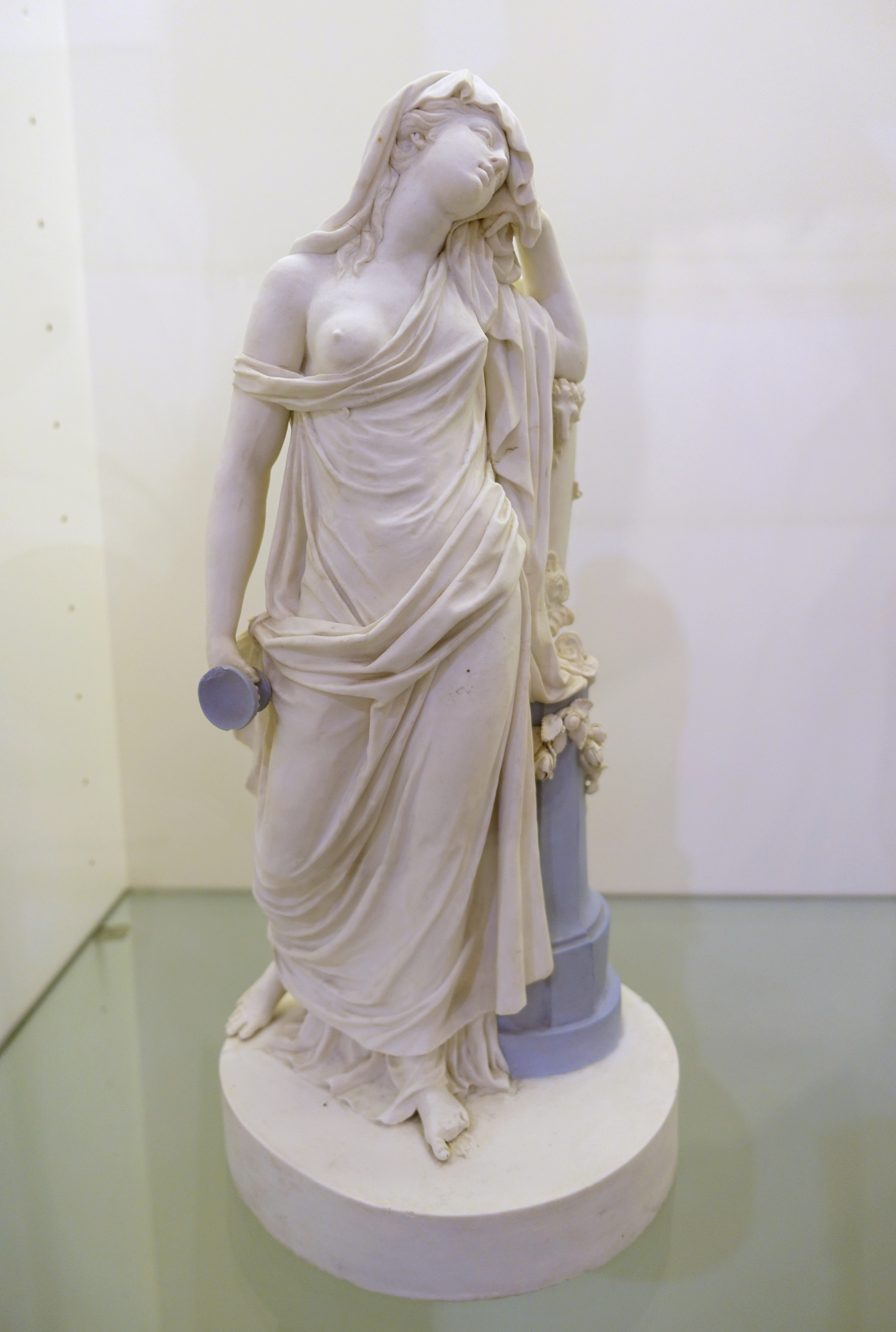
Attendee at a symposium, in biscuit porcelain including the Jasperware blue, 1784-1803

The early form of the factory mark, a fleur-de-lys (upside down, from the writing-set).

== See also ==
- Real Fábrica de Cristales de La Granja
- Royal Tapestry Factory
