= Castle of Belmonte (Cuenca) =

Castle in Cuenca, Spain

Coordinates: 39.5581°N 2.6969°W

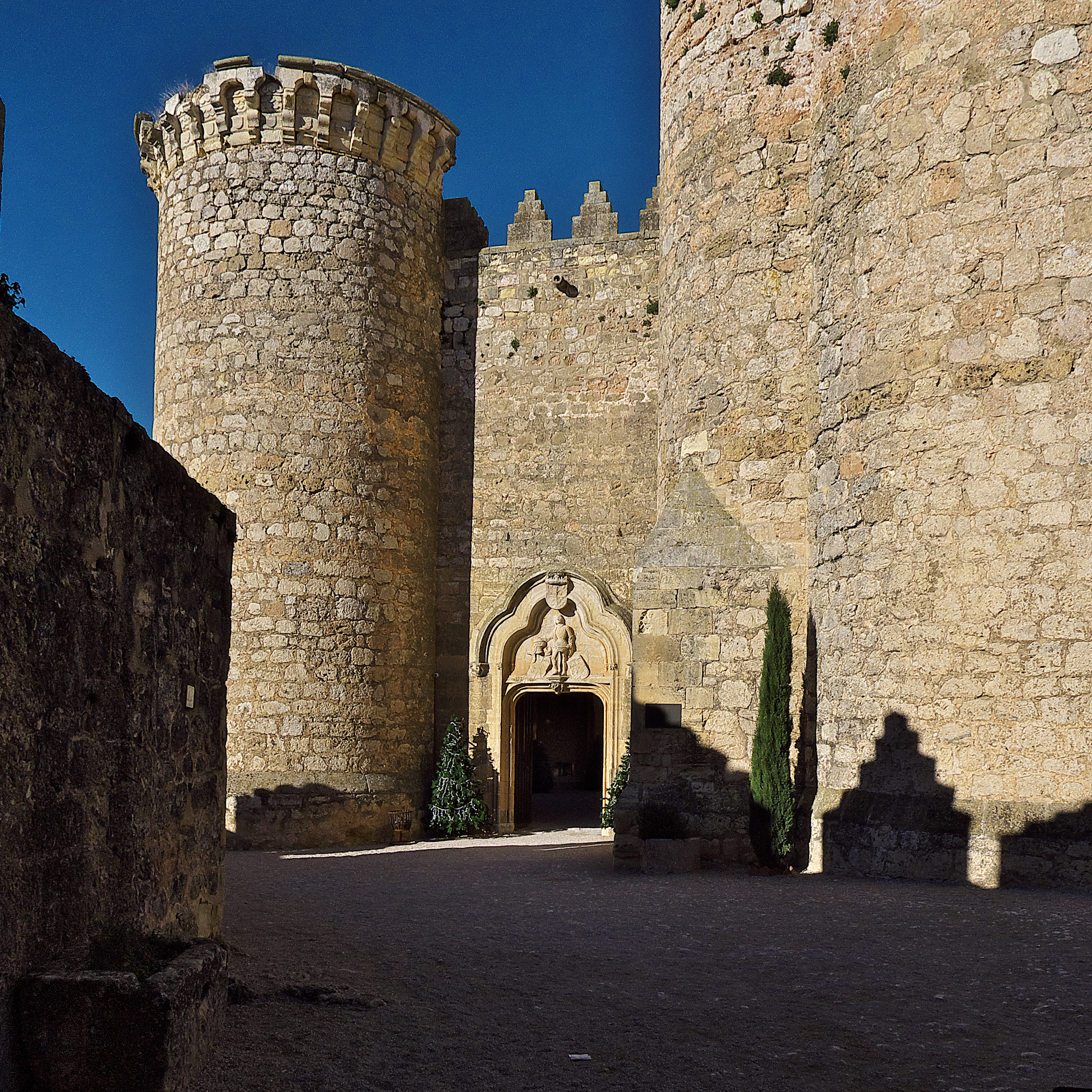
The entrance to the castle

The Castillo de Belmonte is a medieval castle on the hill of San Cristobal, just outside the village of Belmonte in the southwest of the province of Cuenca in Spain. It was declared a historic monument within the National Artistic Treasury by a decree of 3 June 1931 and is now a Bien de Interés Cultural.

== History ==
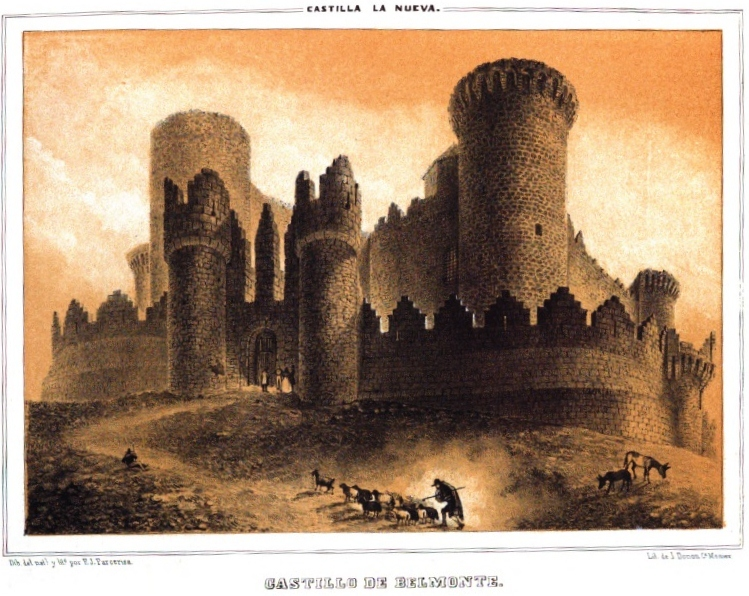
The castle in 1807

It was built in the second half of the 15th century by order of Don Juan Pacheco, first Marquis de Villena, during a time of convulsions and infighting in the Kingdom of Castille and so Pacheco wished to build up his territory and build forts around it before worse problems arose. He probably took on Juan Guas as his architect, who had already worked for him on the Monastery of Santa María del Parral. It was begun in 1456 but remained incomplete on the death of Pacheco. His son Diego Lopez de Pacheco partly continued his father's work, but mostly neglected the fortress.

The fortress was practically abandoned between the 17th and 18th centuries and was more or less ruinous by the early 19th century. The heiress of the house of Villena, Eugenia de Guzman, better known as the Empress Eugenia de Montijo and her architect Alejandro Sureda began a restoration project in 1857, keeping the exterior in the original style but updating the interior to modern tastes - for example, Sureda used bricks for internal galleries overlooking the inner courtyard. Montijo had spent more than 500,000 pesetas on the project by the time it ended with the fall of the Second French Empire in 1870.

The castle was then occupied as a French Dominican monastery for several years. After the Dominicans left, the empress' great-nephew the Duke of Penaranda, Hernando Fitz-James Stuart e Falco continued the restoration and even lived within the castle. It later served as a prison for the Partido Judicial de Belmonte, and as an Onésimo Redondo academy for the Francoist 'Frente de Juventudes'. It was abandoned and began to deteriorate again, before being made a cultural monument in 1931. It is now owned by the descendants of the empress' sister Maria Francisca de Sales Portocarrero. It was restored again in summer 2010 and opened to the public.
