= Bartolomé Sureda y Miserol =

Portrait of Bartolomé Sureda y Miserol by Francisco Goya, 1803–04.

Bartolomé Sureda y Miserol (1769–1851) was a Spanish manager of several royal artistic enterprises. He served as director of the Real Fábrica del Buen Retiro and later the successor Royal Factory of La Moncloa, both making porcelain in Madrid, as well as the Real Fábrica de Paños in Guadalajara, and the Real Fábrica de Cristales de La Granja, this making glass.

== Biography ==
Sureda was trained in France in 1800 in the manufacture of porcelain and textiles. He returned to Spain in 1803, where he was made initially the Director of Labour, and the Director of the Real Fábrica del Buen Retiro in 1807; here he developed hard-paste porcelain which helped in quality production and financial improvement of the company. With the French invasion in 1808 and eventual destruction of the factory in 1812, Sureda returned to France. He was known to be in Mallorca in 1817 and was involved in manufacturing "worsted cloth." He was recalled to Madrid to head the Real Fábrica de Paños in Guadalajara and was also given the charge as acting director of the Real Fabrica de la Moncloa. In 1817, Buen Retiro's successor became the new Royal Porcelain Factory at Moncloa. All the employees of the destroyed factory were reemployed in the new one, and Sureda returned to be its director until 1820. In 1822, he became director of the Real Fábrica de Cristales de La Granja. After his retirement from the royal service on 13 November 1829, he moved back to Mallorca.

He was recalled to Buen Retiro from Paris, on 2 September 1803 and as per records he started working in the factory from October 1803. This establishes the dating of the portraits of Sureda and his wife, painted by Goya and dated 1803-1808; the costume worn for the portrait is of 1799 vintage which also establishes the dates.

When he worked in Buen Retiro, Sureda used for his porcelain works all the materials required in hard-paste porcelain, similar to that used in Sèvres porcelain, except for the kaolin and calcined Scapolite, its substitute; lead was not used by him in his works. He used pure feldspar flux (feldspar obtained from Colmenar de Oreja) for glazing. He drew raw materials from sites close to Madrid, Vallecas’s scapolite and Galagar's flint. The magnesium paste developed by him, which he used extensively in the manufacture of Buen Retiro Porcelain was considered unique for its chemical composition which permitted firing under varying temperatures.

He followed Goya’s style of painting, and after he retired to Mallorca devoted his time to his life’s ambition of painting of landscapes, religious themes and general scenes. He died on 10 March 1851. His son Alejandro Sureda became a noted architect.
