= Real Fábrica de Cristales de La Granja =

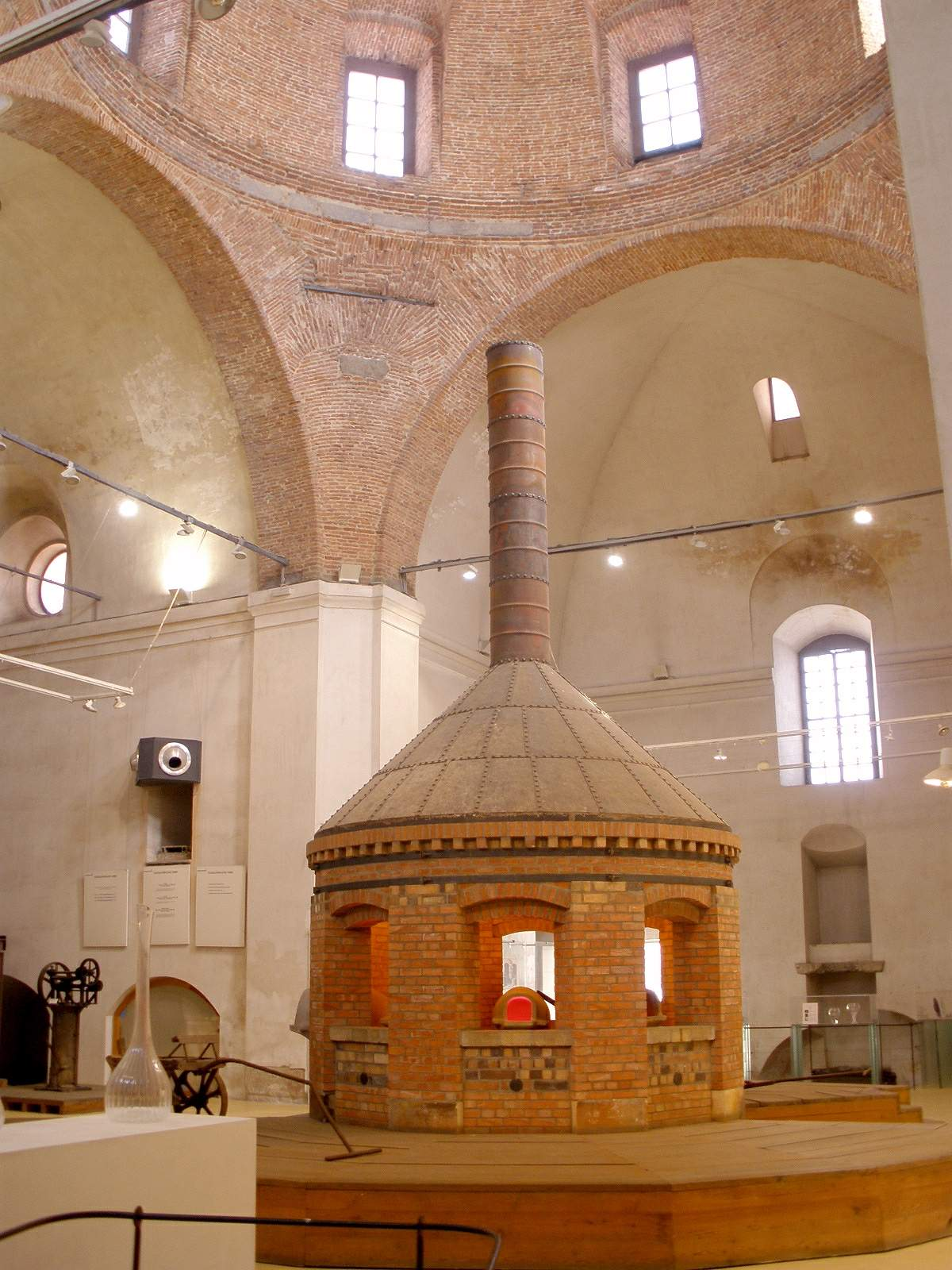
Interior of the Real Fábrica de Cristales

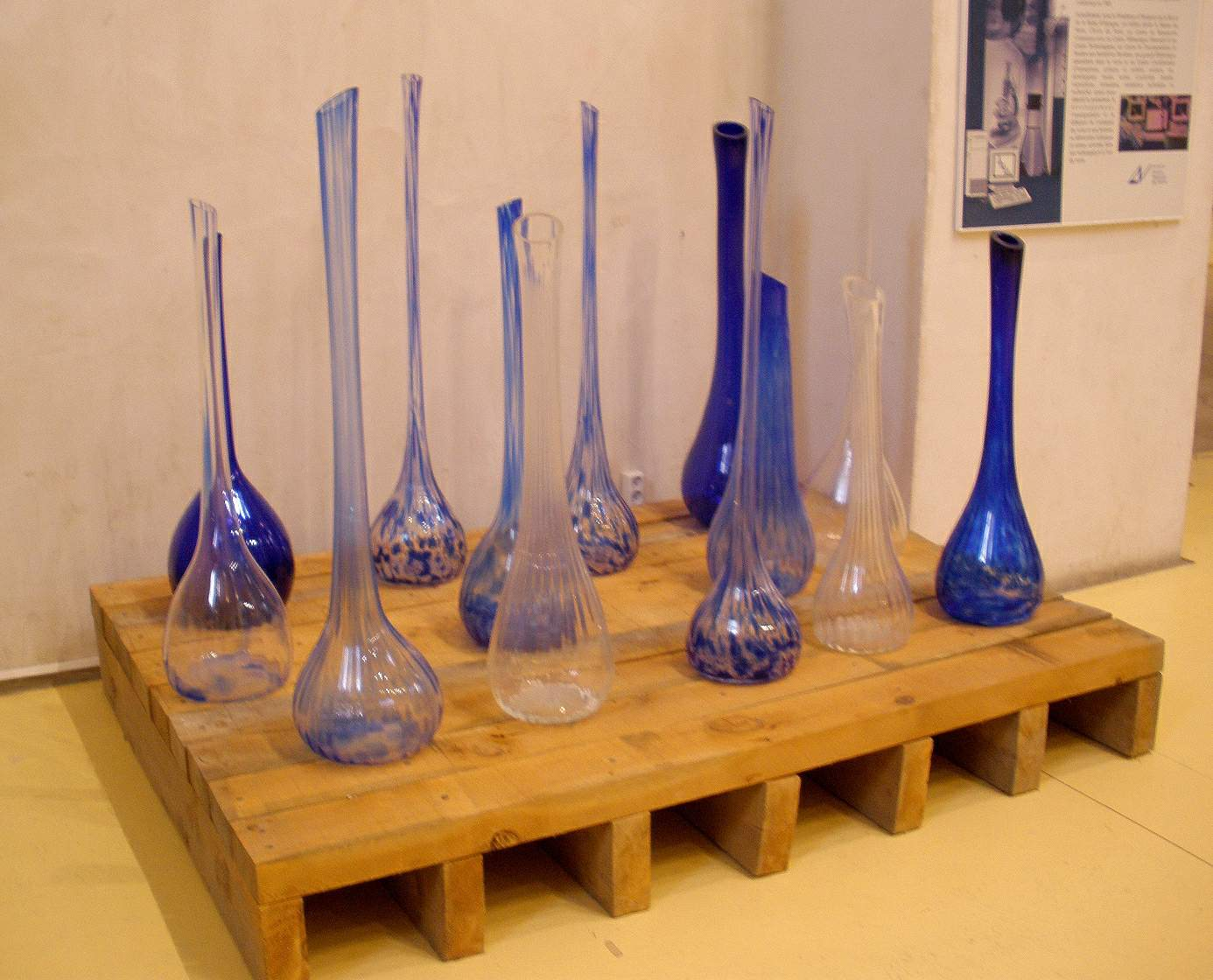
Crystalware manufactured in Real Fábrica de Cristales de La Granja de San Ildefonso

The Real Fábrica de Cristales de La Granja ("Royal Factory of Glass and Crystal of La Granja") is a glass factory in San Ildefonso near Segovia, Spain. It was built as a royal manufactory in the eighteenth century. It is 7 miles (11 km) south east of Segovia on the CL-601 road.

== History ==
It was established in 1727 by Philip V of Spain. In that year, funded by the crown, the Catalan artisan Ventura Sit installed a small oven which manufactured float glass for the windows and mirrors of the Royal Palace of La Granja de San Ildefonso, which was under construction in the 1720s. Sit had previously worked at Nuevo Baztán where a glass factory failed because of inadequate fuel supplies. At La Granja there was an abundant supply of wood for the factory in the Sierra de Guadarrama. Some employees relocated to La Granja de San Ildefonso.

A good number of European specialists with knowledge of the newest glass techniques joined. According to their origins, up to three glass factories were established: Spanish, French and German, as well as different workshops and a general warehouse in Madrid. The best glass of Venetian type produced in the works dates from the last quarter of the 18th century.

Due to the Spanish War of Independence, the ovens were turned off in 1808. Ferdinand VII resumed work in 1815. Bartolome Sureda y Miserol, previously director of the Real Fábrica de Porcelana del Buen Retiro, the Real Fábrica de Paños in Guadalajara, and the Real Fábrica de Loza de la Moncloa, became director of the Real Fábrica de Cristales de La Granja in 1822. Glass blowing and glassware production could be viewed at the factory. The wares of the royal factory were exported to the Americas, which caused financial losses to the other countries who exported as well.

Under the regency of Maria Cristina, in 1833 the spaces were rented to individuals. By 1836, with the royal factory experiencing financial hardship, the Royal Treasury formally took over the facility which, unlike other royal factories, failed to financially support itself.

== Fundación Centro Nacional del Vidrio ==
To revive the traditions of the Royal Glass Factory, the National Glass Centre Foundation was established in 1982 in the eighteenth-century building. The Ministerial Order of 1989 was formalized by law in 1994, its basic objective being “the promotion, development, education, research and dissemination of craftsmanship and history of glass manufacture artistic and other cultural and scientific activities related to art and art glass.”

The Glass Technology Museum is located in the old Royal Glass Factory, the only factory building that is currently preserved in the Royal Site, designed in 1770 by the surveyor, Joseph Díaz Gamones, and built outside the walls of the Granja, with a basilica plan facing South and two large, new brick domes over the melting furnaces, instead of the old wooden frames that caused fires. It is one of the most relevant European industrial buildings of the 18th century, declared an Asset of Cultural Interest.

== Bibliography ==
- Julio Tomás Arribas, Historia de Segovia. Segovia, Caja de Ahorros y Monte de Piedad de Segovia, 1987. ISBN 84-7580-471-3 (in Spanish).
