= Royal Factory of La Moncloa =

Spanish porcelain factory

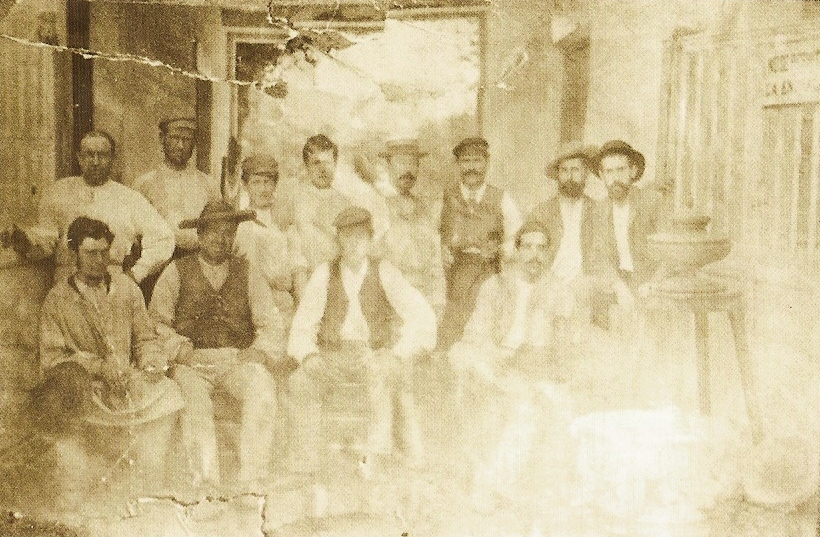
Royal Factory of La Moncloa, 1883

Royal Factory of La Moncloa (Spanish: Real Fábrica de La Moncloa; variations: Moncloa Porcelain Factory, or Royal Porcelain Factory and Thin Earthenware of the Moncloa, or Real Fábrica de Loza de la Moncloa) (Spanish: Real Fábrica de La Moncloa) was a Spanish manufacturing plant for porcelain and ceramics which was in operation in the 19th century. The Royal Factory of La Moncloa was located in Moncloa-Aravaca, Madrid, in a place called the Granjilla of Jeronimos in Cementerio de La Florida.

== History ==
When the British attacked French positions in Madrid in 1812, during the Peninsular War they damaged the Real Fábrica del Buen Retiro, a porcelain factory on a site in the Buen Retiro Park. Later that year General Hill took his troops from Madrid to join the main army under Wellington near Alba de Tormes. Before leaving the Spanish capital, the British burned what remained of the factory. Although the building had been fortified as part of French defensive positions in the park, it has been suggested that the destruction was at least in part caused by commercial rivalry on the part of the British, as it represented a mercantilist project designed to reduce the need for imports.

Production resumed after the absolutist restoration, but at a new site in the Moncloa district of Madrid in a building which had once been a villa of the Alva family on the Manzanares River. The Royal Factory of La Moncloa inherited personnel as well as moulds and other materials surviving from the old factory. Founded by Ferdinand VII, the factory was patronized by his second wife, Queen Maria Isabel of Portugal.

The first director was an Italian, Antonio Forni from the Capodimonte porcelain manufactory. There was a change of artistic policy under Bartolomé Sureda y Miserol, appointed to the position of acting director on 26 March 1821, and made the full director the following year. Sureda had been director of the Real Fábrica de Porcelana del Buen Retiro, and during his career he ran other royal factories such as the Real Fábrica de Paños in Guadalajara, and the Real Fábrica de Cristales de La Granja. Sureda was succeeded by Eusebio Zuloaga (1808–1898). It continued to operate until 1849. It was revived in the 1870s, and was involved with architectural ceramics such as the tiles of the Palacio de Velazquez.

In order to meet the requirements of the factory's pottery industry with technically trained personnel, a school of ceramic arts (Escuela de Cerámica Artística) was established in Moncloa, as well as a factory for the production of fine loza. In 1877, 2 hectares (4.9 acres) of land was allotted for this purpose. In 1882, the Escuela de Cerámica Artística was divided to form Escuela Oficial de Cerámica (Official School of Ceramics) and the Escuela Madrileña de Cerámica de La Moncloa (Madrid School of Ceramics of La Moncloa). The schools came under pressure in 1911 from Francisco Alcántara. Subsidy grants to run the schools were formalized in 1914 through a royal decree under the title "Escuela de Ceramica Artistica".
