= Antonio Carlos de Borbón =

Antonio Carlos de Borbón (d. 1783) was an Afro-Spanish architect and artist. Along with his brothers, he was part of the household of King Charles III of Spain, eventually becoming his main architect and building prominent works for him in Madrid.

== Biography ==
An African slave, he and his two brothers were either part of the crew or the cargo of a Barbary corsair from Algiers captured by a vessel from the Kingdom of Naples, which was then ruled by King Charles, son of Philip V of Spain. King Charles himself purchased them and had them baptized into the Catholic faith. They were given the names Antonio Carlos, José Carlos and Genaro Carlos. Following the Hispanic tradition of bestowing their surname upon their slaves, all three were given the surnamed after the House of Bourbon. Another, unrelated black slave from the ship named Francisco Carlos was baptized alongside them. The four of them formed what was known as the Casa de los Negros ("Household of the Blacks"), serving as the monarch's personal attendants.

They received their education under the priest Miguel de Ignarra, after which Antonio and José excelled in the fine arts. José became the king's court painter, leaving behind several works now held in the Museo del Prado, while Antonio pursued a career in architecture.

In 1759, Charles became King Charles III of Spain, and his attendants followed him to Madrid, becoming part of the king's new royal household under the authority of the Sumiller de Corps José Fernández-Miranda Ponce de León. It was there that Antonio undertook his first architectural commissions, among them the construction on the Real Fábrica del Buen Retiro. This project was modeled after its Neapolitan counterpart in Capodimonte and incorporated the existing hermitage of San Antonio de los Portugueses, which had been built by Alonso Carbonel. That same year, Antonio also constructed the Royal Stables at the Castle of Viñuelas, the only work of his that survives to this day. In 1761, he married Ana Catalina Dobnerin, a laundress to the late Queen Maria Amalia of Saxony, and in August 1765, he was appointed Arquitecto de Obras Reales, the pinnacle of prestige in his profession.

In 1767, however, the habitual delay in the payment of his fees forced him to incur substantial debts, for which he was sentenced to six months of imprisonment at the Cuartel de las Capuchinas. He regained some financial stability with the assistance of the Sumiller de Corps, but he and his wife remained in a precarious economic situation until his death in 1783.

== Bibliography ==
- Guerra de la Vega, Ramón (1995). El palacio Real y la arquitectura de Felipe V de Borbón. Guía de Madrid y la Granja. Monterreina.
- Moreno Villa, José (1930). Locos, enanos y niños palaciegos. Gentes de placer en la Corte española desde 1563 a 1700. Presencia.
