= Luis María Cabello Lapiedra =

Spanish architect

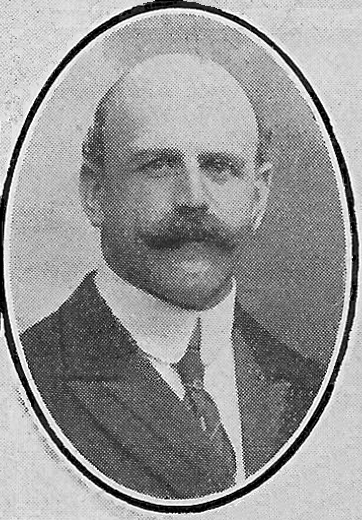
- Portrait of Luis María Cabello Lapiedra (Federico Terol, 1914)
- Born: Luis María Cabello y Lapiedra; December 28, 1863; Madrid, Spain
- Died: August 15, 1936 (aged 72); El Escorial, Spanish Republic
- Occupation(s): Architect, art critic

Luis María Cabello y Lapiedra (28 December 1863, Madrid - 15 August 1936, El Escorial) was a Spanish architect and architectural critic.

== Life ==
His ideology was conservative and close to that of Enrique Repullés and his nephew Luis Martínez-Feduchi. He opposed modernism and represented a regenerationist-nationalist current in Spanish architecture. His works include the Real Academia Nacional de Medicin.

His brother was the writer Xavier Cabello Lapiedra. During the Second Spanish Republic he acted as secretary general to Renovación Española and was executed during the Spanish Civil War.

== Sources ==
- "Bibliografía básica de arquitectura en Madrid: siglos XIX y XX". repositorio.uam.es. Archived from the original on 2016-03-04.
