= Maiello =

Maiello is an Italian surname from Naples and Caserta. Notable people with the surname include:

- Fabrizio Maiello, Italian former criminal and football player
- Giovanni Vittorio Majello or Maiello (fl. 17th century), Italian composer
- Raffaele Maiello (born 1991), Italian football player
- Tony Maiello (born 1989), Italian singer-songwriter

== See also ==
- Majella (name)
- Majello
