= Majella (name) =

Majella is a feminine given name and a surname. Notable people with the name include:

== Given name ==
- Marie Majella Berg (1916–2004), American nun, educator and administrator
- Majella Brown (born 1980), Australian volleyball player
- Majella Cullinane, Irish-New Zealand poet
- Majella Franzmann (born 1952), Australian professor
- Margaret Majella Keech (born 1954), Australian politician
- Clare Majella Martin (born 1952), Australian former journalist and politician
- Majella Murphy (born 1973), Irish singer-songwriter
- Majella O'Donnell (born 1960), Irish singer
- Majella O'Hare (1964–1976), Irish murder victim
- Cecil Majella Sheridan (1911–2000), British lawyer and last British Attorney General of Malaya
- Majella Wiemers (born c. 1976), Australian television producer and news anchor
- Franz Joseph II (1906–1989), reigning Prince of Liechtenstein (1938–1989); one of his 14 Christian names was Majella.

== Surname ==
- Geraldo Majella Agnelo (1933–2023), Brazilian Roman Catholic cardinal
- Gerard Majella (1726–1755), Italian Roman Catholic saint

== See also ==
- Maiella, also called Majella, mountain massif in Abruzzo, Italy
- 7233 Majella, a main-belt asteroid
- Majello
- Maiello
