= Santa Maria delle Grazie a Capodimonte =

Church in Naples, Italy

Coordinates: 40.869910°N 14.249225°E

Santa Maria delle Grazie a Capodimonte is a church located in via Bosco in Capodimonte in Naples, Italy.

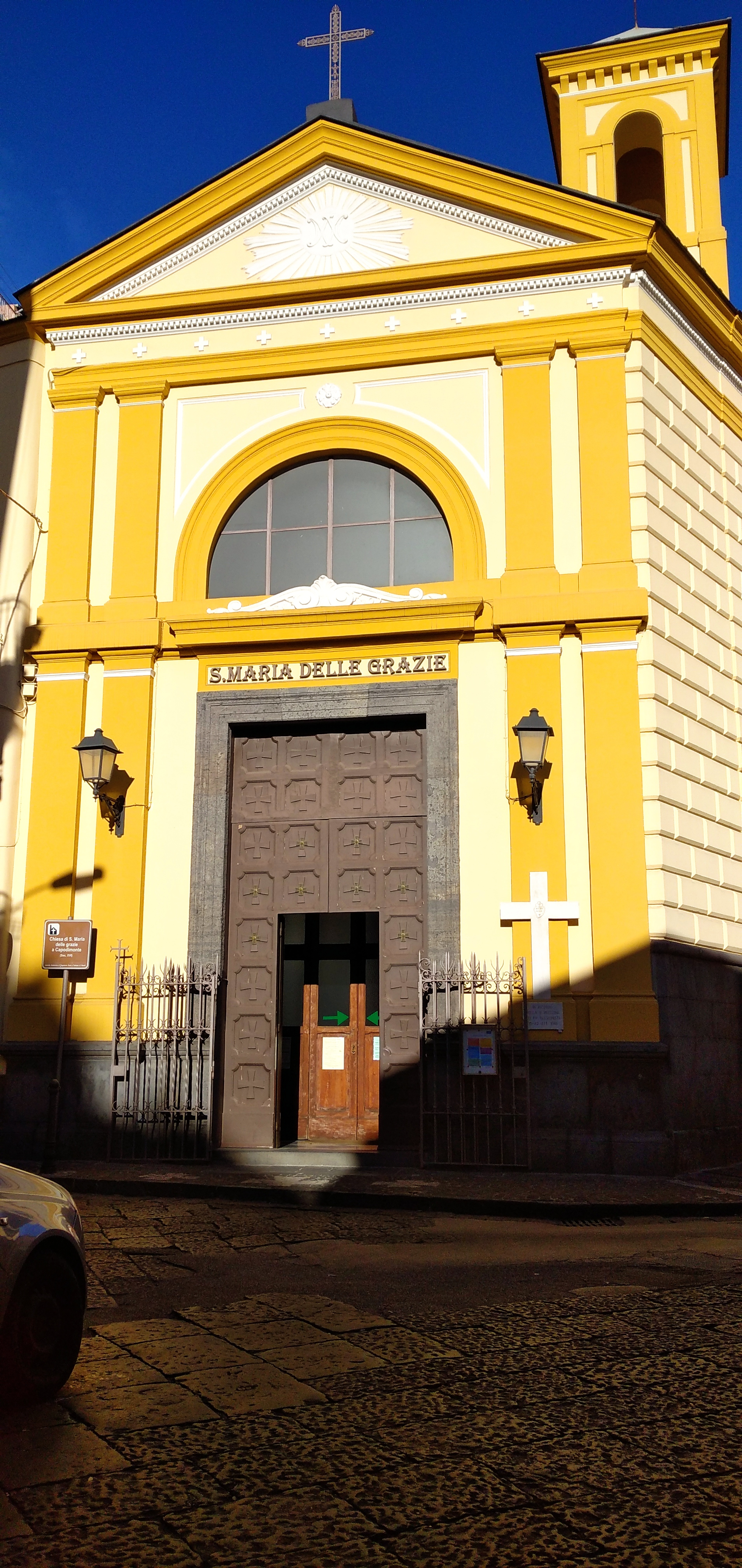
Exterior.

The church was founded as a local parish church in 1575 under the patronage of the Marquis Innocenzo Mazza. It was named Madonna delle Grazie due to a local shrine (aedicule) dedicated to that iconic image. It is now close to the Reggia di Capodimonte. The church was reconstructed in the 20th century.

The interior has a single nave with keel shaped roof with curved stucco decoration. The apse is covered by a semicircular cupola. The nave niches have statuary. In the chapel of Confraternita is a canvas of the Annunciation with two fraternity members by an unknown 18th-century artist. A plaque at the entry recalls an indulgence given to the confraternity in January 1780 by Pius VI. In the chapel of St Anne is an altar, likely by Tommaso Scotti, with a wooden statue of the saint (1783), which is held in particular devotion in the Capodimonte neighborhood.

== Bibliography ==
- Antonio Terraciano, Andrea Russo, Le chiese di Napoli. Censimento e brevi recensioni delle 448 chiese storiche della città di Napoli, Lorenzo Giunta Editor, 1999.
- Photo of the Chapel of the Confraternity or Congrega, and of the altar sullo sfondo
- Photo of nave before removal of altars
- Photo of the facade
