= Majello =

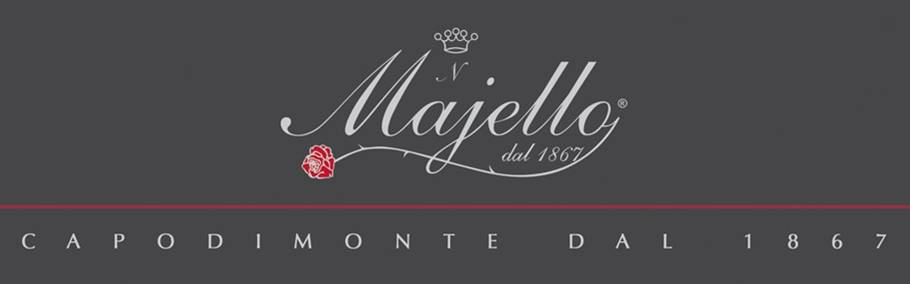
- Company type: Handcraft company
- Industry: Porcelain
- Founded: 1867; 159 years ago
- Founder: Alfonso Majello
- Headquarters: Naples, Italy
- Key people: Lucio Majello, sculptor (General Manager); Fabio Majello (Sales Manager); Sabrina Majello (Marketing)
- Products: Flower design; "paghetto" porcelain; Statues; Capodimonte design
- Website: www.majello.it

Majello was an Italian factory producing Capodimonte porcelain.

== History ==
In 1867, Alfonso Majello, awarded "Knight of Labour", founded the Majello factory that continued the tradition of producing Capodimonte porcelain started in 1743 with the Royal Factory of Capodimonte founded by king Charles VII. The tradition continues thanks to the sculptor Lucio Majello and his sons.

== Manufacture ==
The artist will trace the sketch of the object that he wants to realize. The first phase is to make a chalk model on a lathe. The sculptor will then chisel and carve the details of the object. The chalk model is put into porcelain liquid form.

Next comes the floral decoration of petals and leaves.

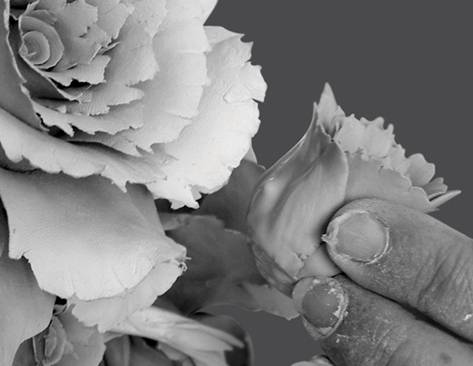

The signature is added to give a guarantee of authenticity to the buyer. Next the object is cooked to 1250 grades that lasts a minimum of eight and a maximum of 12 hours from which the biscuit object is obtained.. Decorators paint the object with a brush. Once decorated there is a second cooking of eight hours at 750 grades to fix the colour.

== Authentic Capodimonte ==
- The factory uses the traditional technique of firing "biscuit" porcelain. A first firing is at 1350 degrees, with a second one, after decoration, at 700/800 degrees.
- The factory also uses the traditional technique of firing called terzo fuoco ("third fire") for shiny porcelain, for which the first firing is at 800 degrees; the second, after varnishing, at 1300 degrees; and the third, after decoration, at 750 degrees.

== Typical "Capodimonte" subjects ==
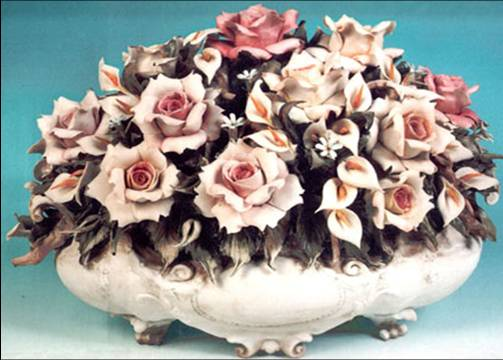
Floral composition

- Flowers: Compositions of flowers

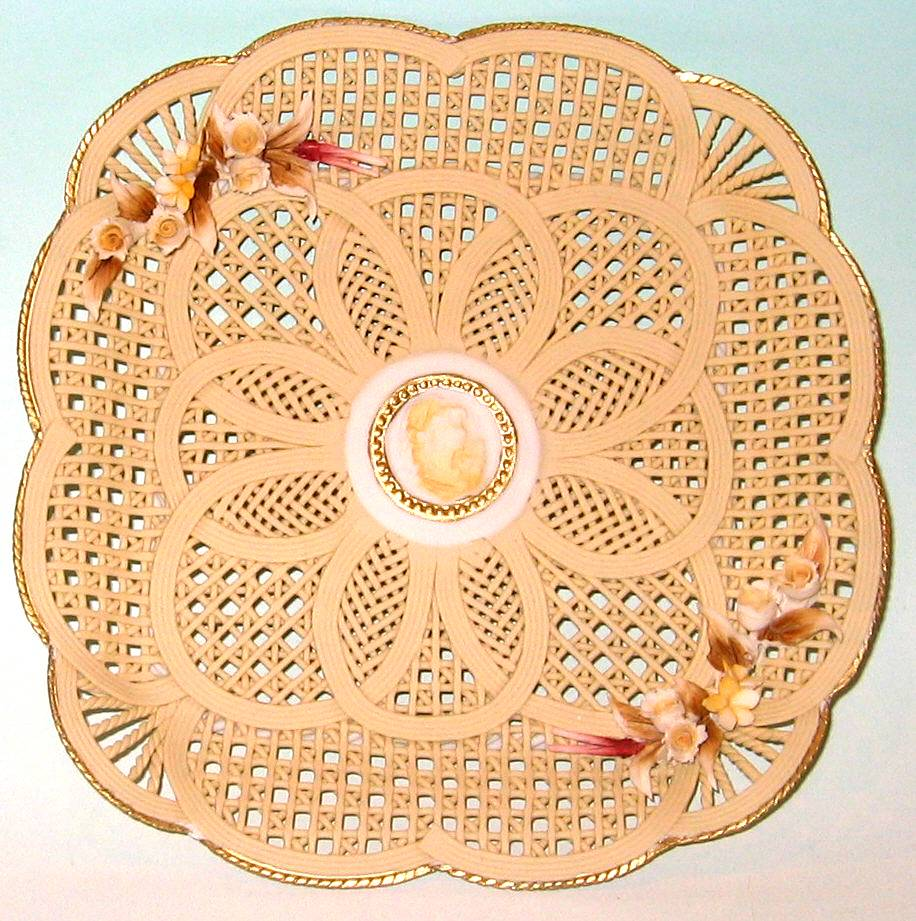
"Spaghetto" style basket

- "Spaghetto" porcelain: plates, lamps, vases and other object completely hand made, enterlaced with very thin porcelain in a spaghetti shape.

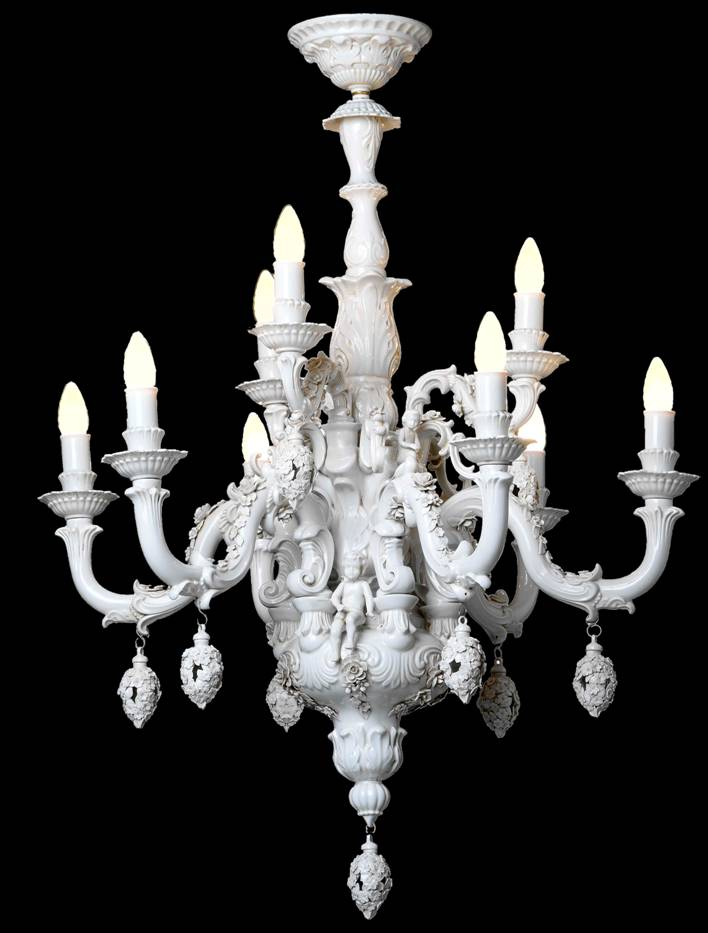
ReginAmalia lamp

- Classic style: reproduction of masterpieces, for example "ReginAmalia", the freely inspired reproduction of the famous lamp created at the end of the 18th century by the artist Giuseppe Gricci for Queen Amalia, the wife of king Charles of Borbon, for the Porcelain boudoir of Maria Amalia of Saxony totally made of porcelain.
- Statues: reproduction of sculptures of the Classic period.

== See also ==
- List of Italian companies
