= Giovanni Vittorio Majello =

Italian composer

Giovanni Vittorio Majello or Maiello (fl. 17th century?) was an Italian composer. He was maestro di cappella at Santa Maria delle Grazie a Capodimonte in Naples.

== Works ==
- Liber primus mottectorum tribus vocibus
