= Giuseppe Gricci =

Italian sculptor

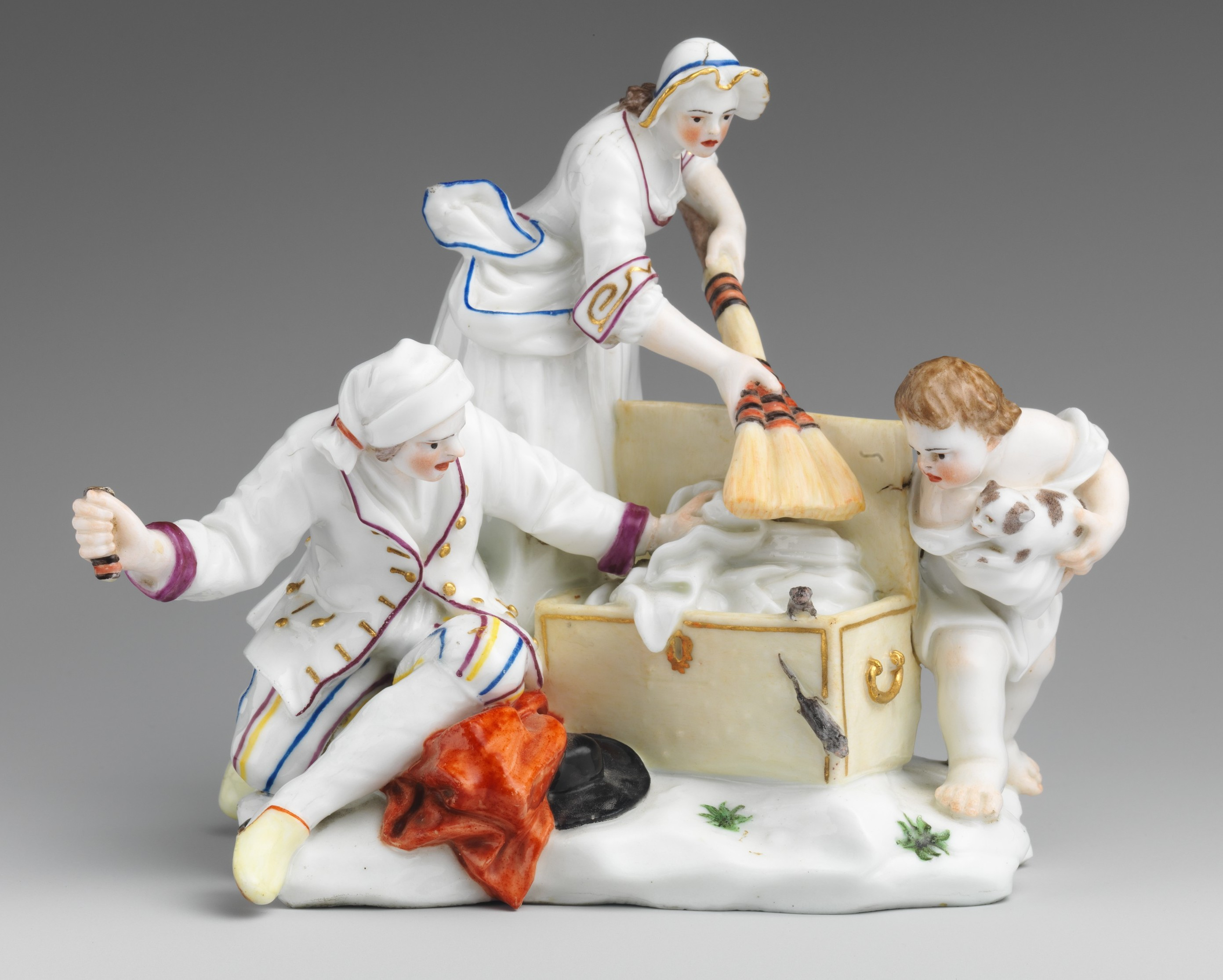
Mouse Catchers, modelled by Gricci, Capodimonte porcelain, 1755–1759

Giuseppe Gricci (c 1700 – 1770) was an Italian sculptor. He was trained in his native Florence before moving to Naples in 1738, where he worked for the king before becoming the chief modeler at the Capodimonte porcelain manufactory when the king set it up in 1743. By 1755 he had five other modellers working for him, creating the moulds used for the pieces.

When his employer became Charles III of Spain in 1759, he moved the whole Capodimonte factory, including Gricci, to Madrid the next year, setting it up as the Real Fábrica del Buen Retiro.

As well as many figure shapes, Gricci designed the Porcelain boudoir of Maria Amalia of Saxony, entirely made of porcelain panels in a chinoiserie style, originally made for the Palace of Portici (1757–59), but now moved to the Capodimonte Palace. The same team later made the rooms in Spain at the Royal Palace of Aranjuez (1763–65) and the main Palacio real in Madrid (1770s).

Gricci died in Madrid.
