= Capodimonte porcelain =

Type of porcelain

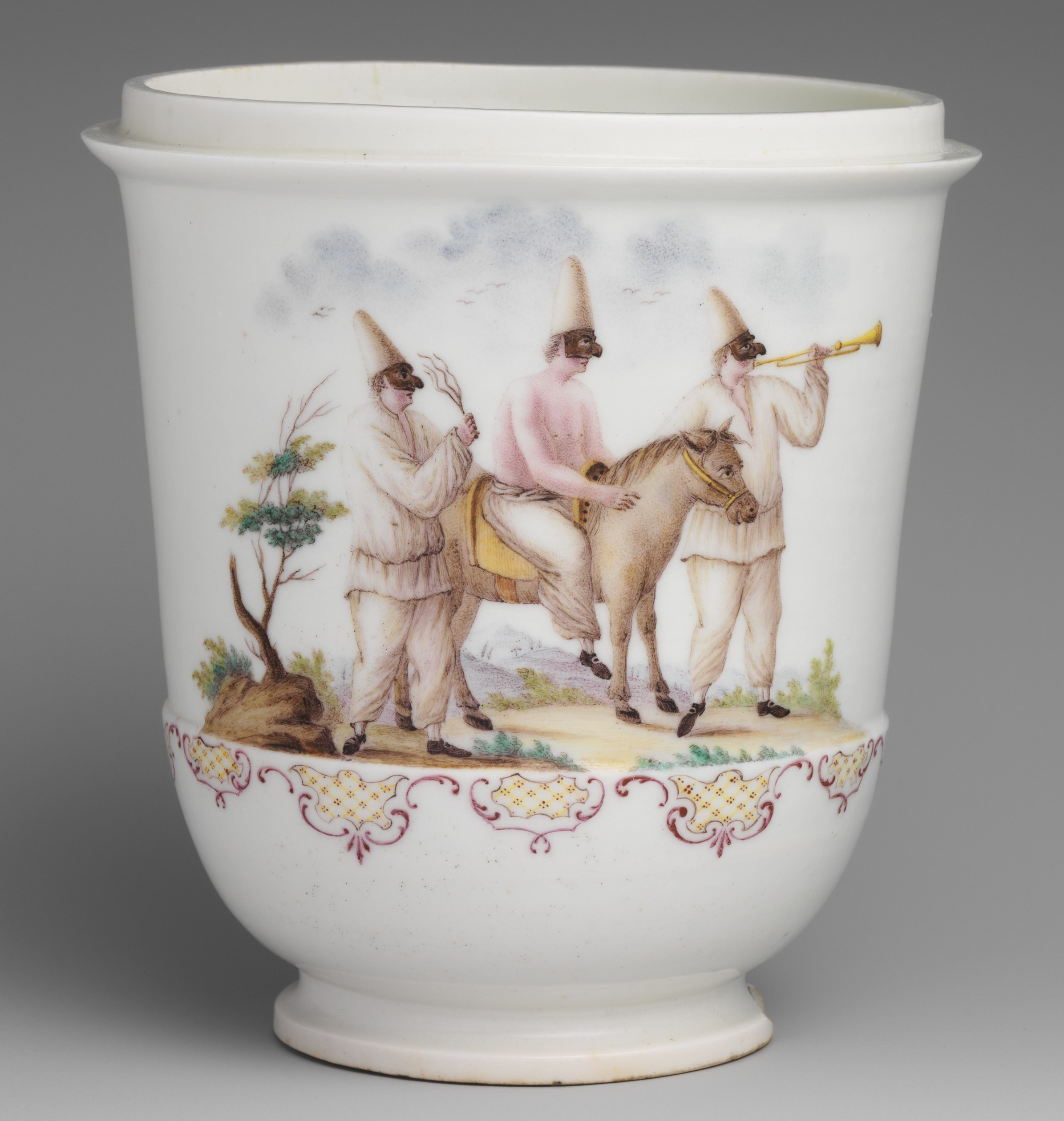
Jar painted by (or in the style of) Giovanni Caselli with three figures of Pulcinella from the commedia dell'arte, 1745–1750. 16.2 cm high

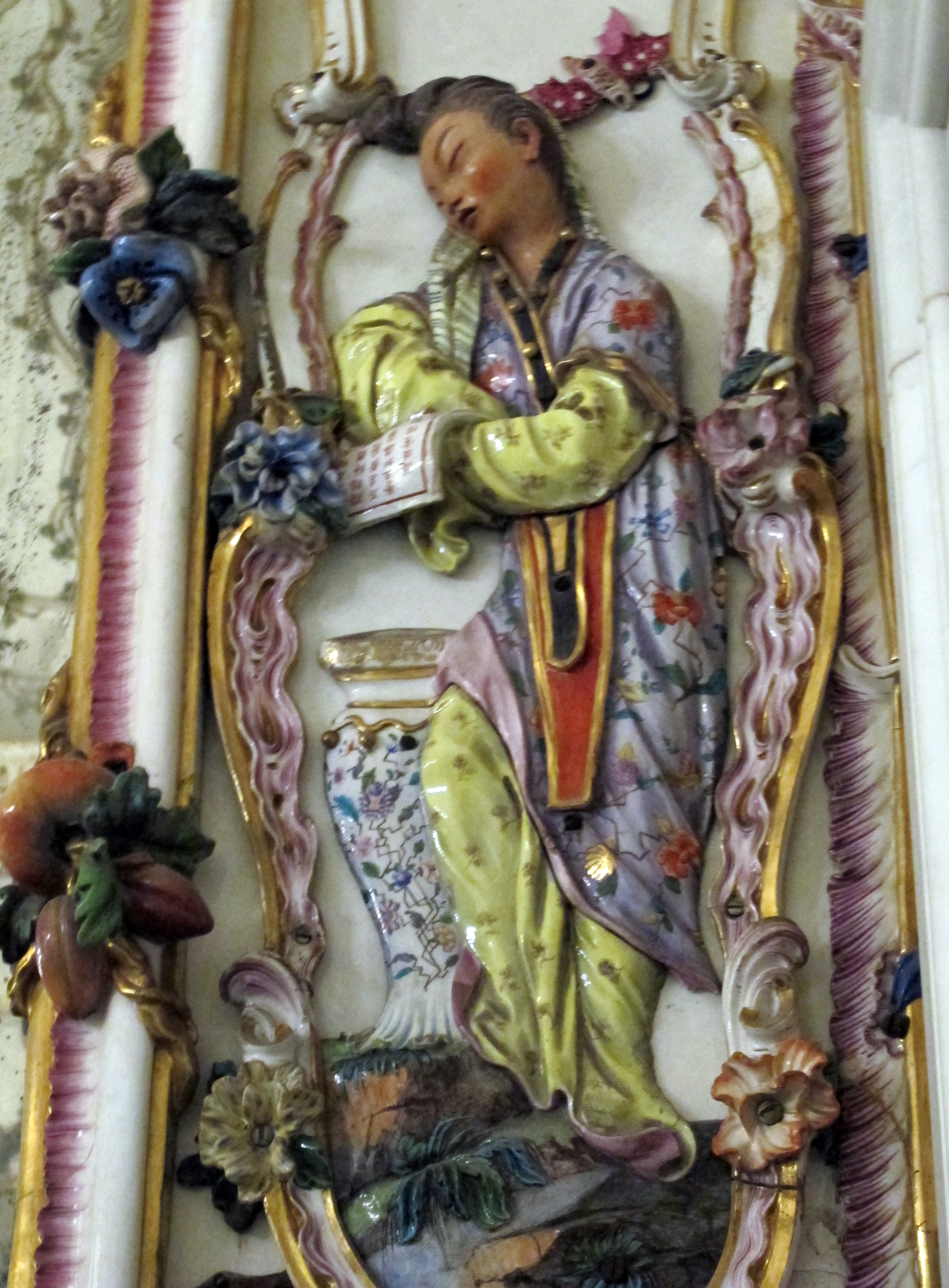
Detail from the porcelain room now in the Palace of Capodimonte

Capodimonte porcelain (sometimes "Capo di Monte") is porcelain created by the Capodimonte porcelain manufactory (Real Fabbrica di Capodimonte), which operated in Naples, Italy, between 1743 and 1759. Capodimonte is the most significant factory for early Italian porcelain, the Doccia porcelain of Florence being the other main Italian factory. Capodimonte is most famous for its moulded figurines.

The porcelain of Capodimonte, and later Naples, was a "superb" translucent soft-paste, "more beautiful" but much harder to fire than the German hard-pastes, or "a particularly clear, warm, white, covered with a mildly lustrous glaze". The Capodimonte mark was a fleur-de-lys in blue, or impressed in relief inside a circle.

The entire Capodimonte factory was moved to Madrid (and became the Real Fábrica del Buen Retiro) after its founder, King Charles, inherited the Spanish throne from his brother in 1759. Strictly speaking, this was the end of "Capodimonte porcelain", but the reputation of the factory's products was so high that the name is often claimed and used for porcelain made in other factories in or around Naples.

The first of these was the new royal factory established by Charles' son Ferdinand I of the Two Sicilies, which manufactured from 1771 until 1806. This is generally known as Naples porcelain, officially the "Naples Royal Porcelain Manufactory" (Real fabbrica delle porcellane di Napoli) or Real Fabbrica Ferdinandea. Since the 19th century, a number of other factories have used the name, for a wide variety of wares, with a great range of quality.

== History ==
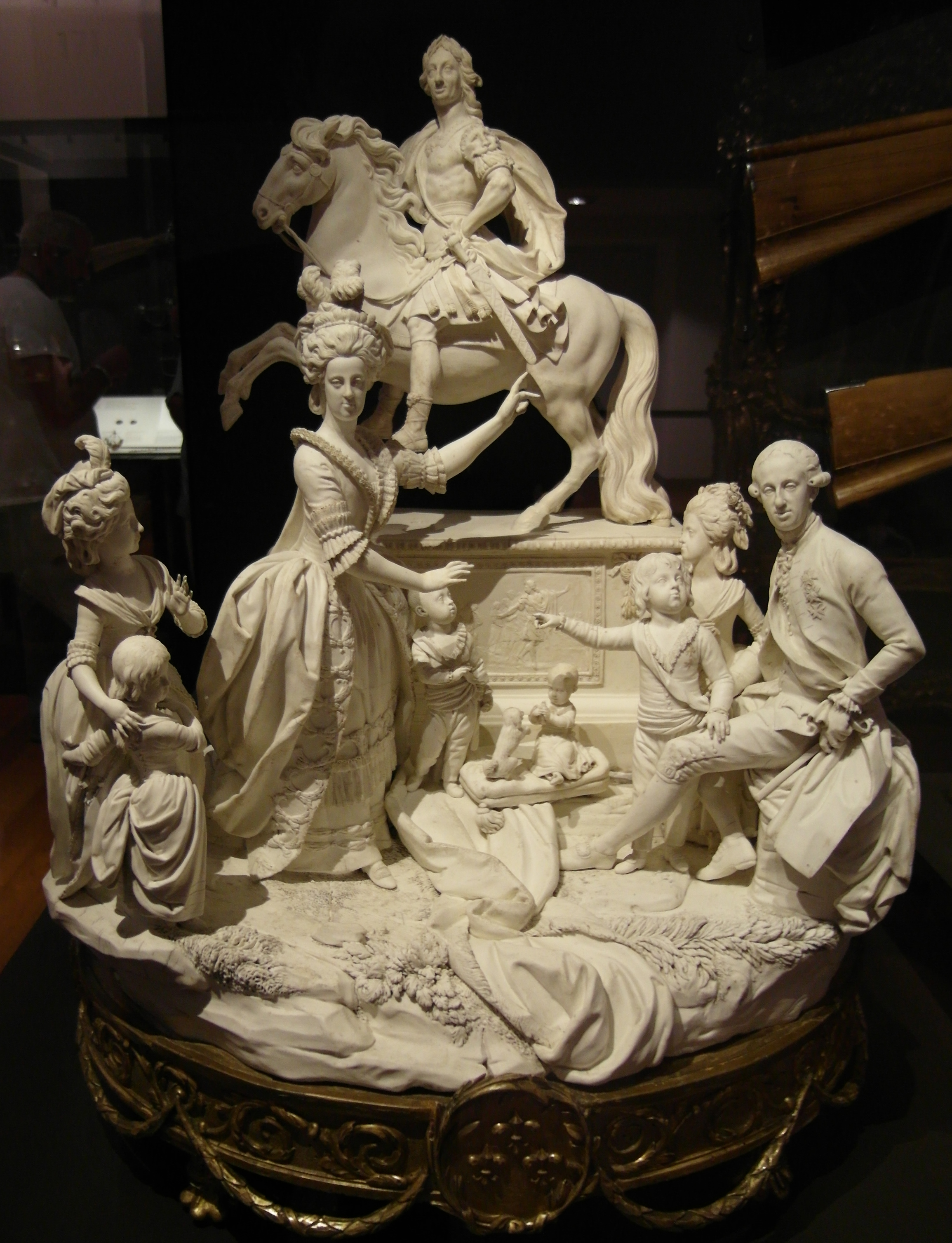
Naples biscuit porcelain group of the Bourbons: King Charles at rear, Ferdinand seated, with his wife and some of their 18 children. Filippo Tagliolini, c. 1784

In 1743, the newly arrived Bourbon King Charles VII of Naples and his wife Queen Maria Amalia of Saxony, founded the factory in the grounds of the Palace of Capodimonte on the outskirts of Naples (now a museum). The queen's grandfather, Augustus II the Strong, Elector of Saxony, had founded the Meissen porcelain factory which led European porcelain, and her dowry is said to have included 17 Meissen table services. They recruited the Flemish chemist Livio Ottavio Schepers, whose son also joined, and the painter Giovanni Caselli (1698–1752), later followed by his niece Maria. The Florentine sculptor Giuseppe Gricci (c. 1700–1770), already working for the Neapolitan crown since 1738, joined as chief modeller; by 1755 he had five other modellers working for him, creating the moulds used for the pieces.

The kingdom's diplomatic network around Europe was ordered to seek out experienced workers and trade secrets, paying generously, and internally a successful organized search was made for sources of the correct minerals, with local authorities sending samples to the capital.

Charles also founded royal factories for making tapestries and pietre dure. Naples already had many factories making maiolica and other wares, often as a sideline from bricks, but the recruiters for Capodimonte rather looked down on the maiolica workers, and the main roles were given to imported workers. The local market developed strongly over this period, helped by a fashion for drinking chocolate, but Capodimonte faced competition from imported porcelain, both Chinese and German, at the top end of the market, and English and local glazed earthenware (creamware and the Italian version called terraglia) in the middle and lower parts of the market.

When Charles became king of Spain in 1759 he took the equipment and about 40 key workers, including Gricci, with him, to found the Real Fábrica del Buen Retiro in Madrid. Since they took nearly five tons of paste, the main artists, and continued to use the fleur-de-lys mark, distinguishing between the products of the two factories from the years around the move can be very difficult. Although the Capodimonte structures and equipment such as kilns and moulds that were not taken to Spain were destroyed, many of the remaining workers were hired by the new Giustiniani factory, which attempted to find a formula for porcelain but failed, instead making fine earthenware similar to Wedgwood.

When porcelain production resumed after fifteen years, the new Naples factory was completely rebuilt in a different location, initially at Portici, but inherited some workers from the Capodimonte factory, and used a similar soft-paste body. It was notable for Neoclassical subjects and styles, and figures in unglazed biscuit porcelain. By 1806, Napoleon had invaded the Kingdom of Naples and the Bourbons fled to Sicily, protected by the British Navy; production was discontinued at the factory. Naples porcelain had the usual mark of a crown over a blue "N", though this mark has been, and continues to be, used by many imitations of greatly varying quality.

Following a trend in the later years of the Naples porcelain factory, after it closed, Neapolitan potteries continued to make creamware, fine glazed earthenware, similar to English Wedgwood. During the second half of the 19th century, the first private porcelain factories in Naples were created, eventually including Majello (1867), Mollica, Cacciapuoti, Visconti, and many others. Copies and forgeries of the early Capodimonte pieces were made by many factories, apparently the largest being at Rudolstadt, then in Germany and now in the Czech Republic. With little or no control over the use of the brand name, many cheap earthenware pieces carry it. "Capo di Monte" was also used in the 19th century, for example by Royal Worcester in England, to refer to styles of figurines, that are in fact little related to the 18th-century Neapolitan products.

== Characteristics ==
=== Capodimonte, 1743–1759 ===
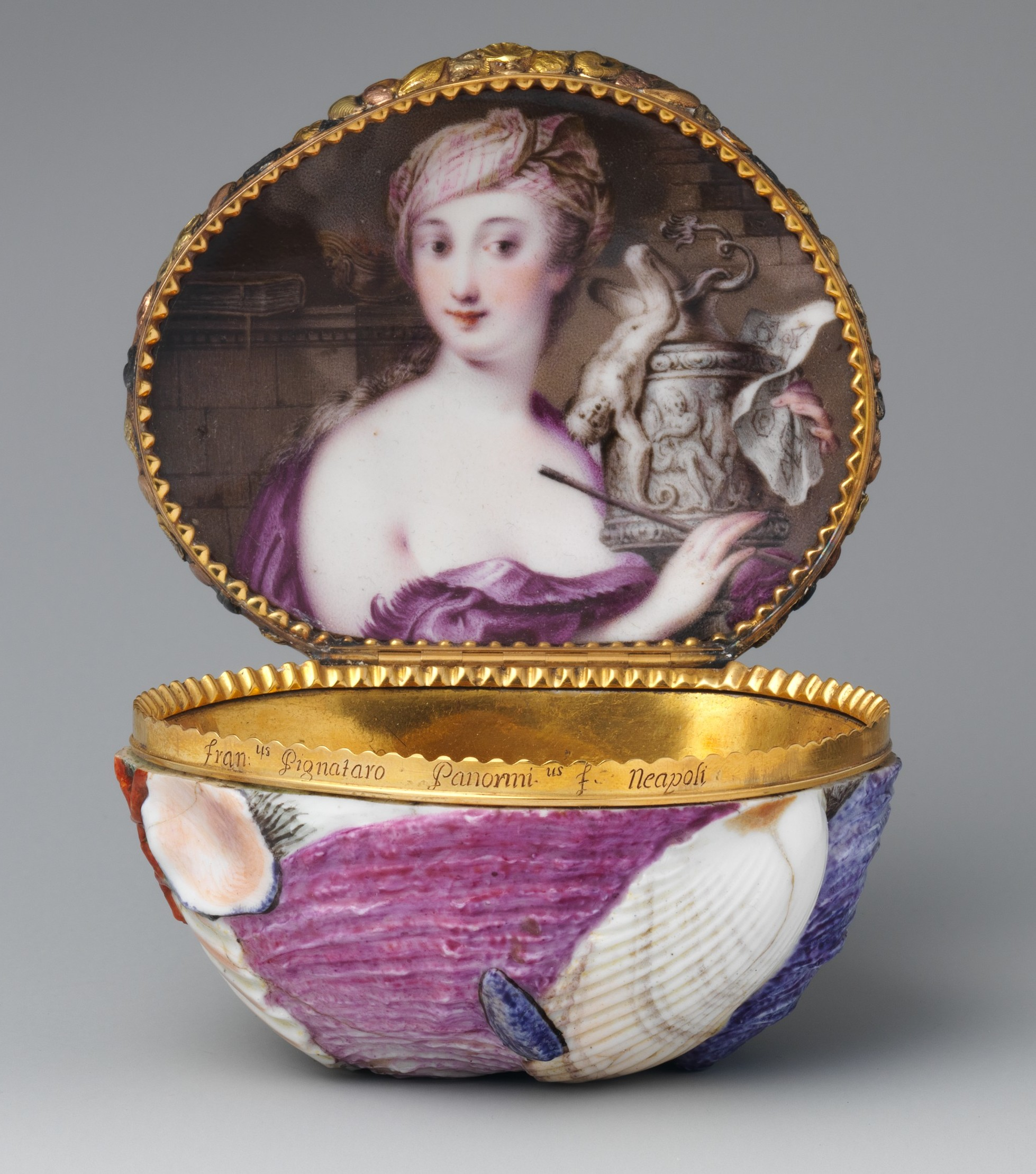
Shell-shaped snuffbox, by Gricci, Caselli and a goldsmith, 1745–1750

The true Capodimonte wares of the short period between 1743 and 1759 included tableware of the usual types, figures, and the Porcelain boudoir of Maria Amalia of Saxony entirely made of porcelain panels in a chinoiserie style, originally made for the Palace of Portici (1757–59), but now moved to the Capodimonte Palace. The same team later made the rooms in Spain at the Royal Palace of Aranjuez (1763–65) and the Royal Palace of Madrid (1770s). As with other factories of the period, Meissen porcelain was taken as the main model.

There are good records from the 1740s, but after that little documentation survives. The shell-shaped snuffbox, modelled in low relief with further small shells and seaweed, was a Gricci design introduced in the first year which remained popular. The inside of the lid was painted with a portrait or other subject, and a goldsmith added mounts and a hinge.

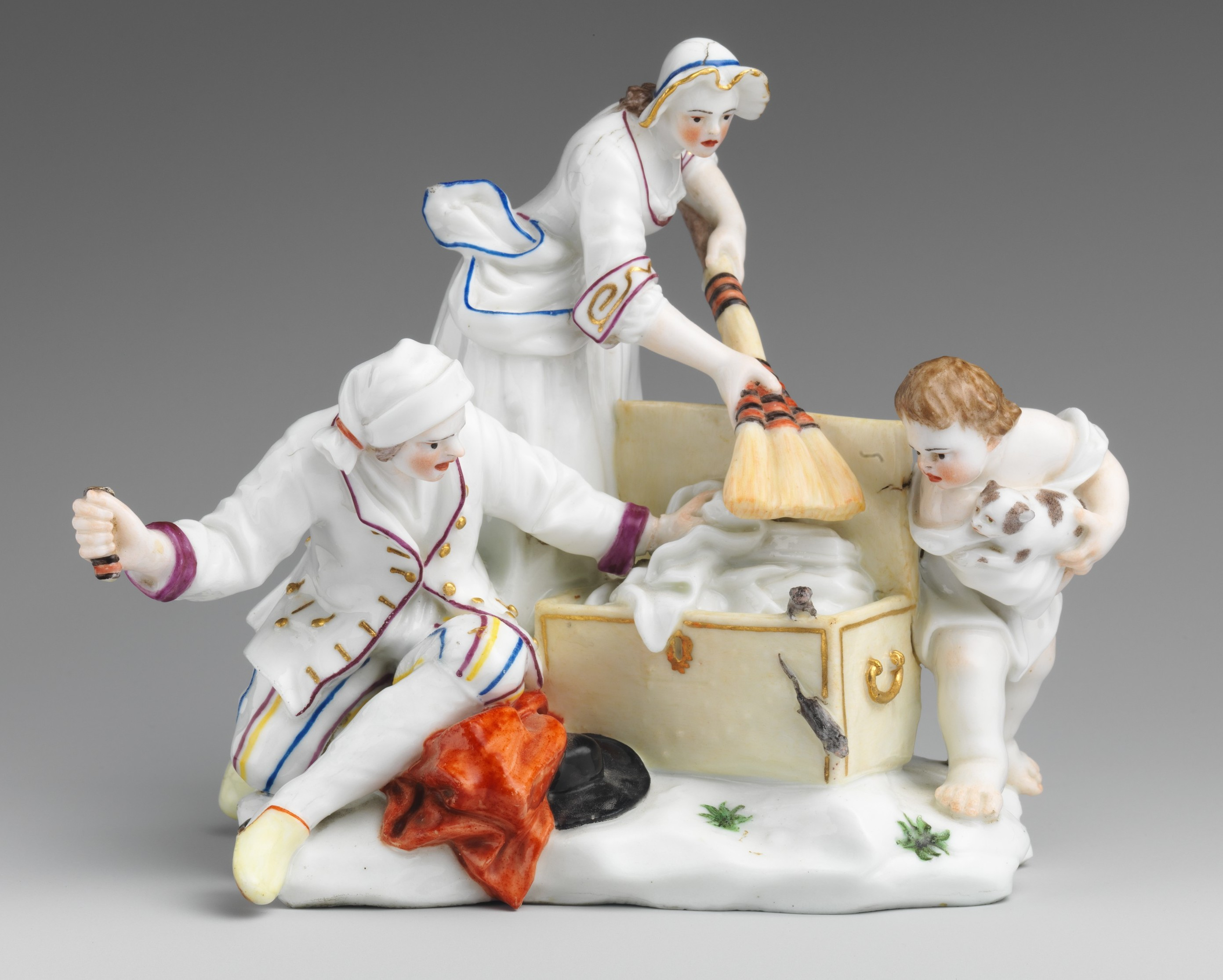
Mouse Catchers, modelled by Giuseppe Gricci, 1755–1759

The popular figures of ordinary people were introduced early, and there are large numbers of models; since Buen Retiro concentrated on these, the difficulties in telling Neapolitan and Madrid pieces apart mostly affect these. Figures tend to have "exceptionally small heads, wide hands and feet, and restrained painting of both features and costume. A prevailing sense of worried good humor is conveyed by coal-speck eyes, and short, swiftly-drawn eyebrows". They are modelled "with an unerring eye for pose and gesture". Often colour is only used to define the edges of garments and objects. The soft paste used did not allow as much sharp definition or as thin elements as German hard-paste, and the modellers had to adapt their style accordingly.

The pottery-seller illustrated, adapting a print after a drawing by Annibale Carracci, is one of a series described in the factory records as figure che rappresentano poveri ("figures of poor people"), although unlike later so-called "Capodimonte" figures, their clothing is neat and clean. Otherwise such subjects of vendors were called la voci di Napooli (street-cries of Naples). An exception to the general good humour of the series is a figure of a mutilated war veteran beggar, with only one of his limbs complete, and one eye. Only a single example of this is known, which sold for £30,000 in 2012. In the same auction a Mouse-catchers group sold for £73,250.

In Caselli's style for painted scenes "compositions were built by gradations of very fine stippling in which much use was made of soft grays and browns", as in the jar with Pulcinellas illustrated. The chinoiserie palette, used in the porcelain room and other pieces was much stronger. Apart from the Casellis, G. della Torre was a painter who specialized in landscapes and figures, including battle-scenes. His clouds are often distinctively coloured "in violet and pale orange-red" (see saucer in gallery). Given the scale of production, and the other modellers and painters recorded, curators and scholars are now less certain in attributing particular works to the individual hands of the main designers and painters, although it is clear they established the styles and supervised production closely. Gricci is only known to have signed two large religious figures, and as was normal for the period, painters did not sign their work.

Capodimonte porcelain, 1743 to 1759

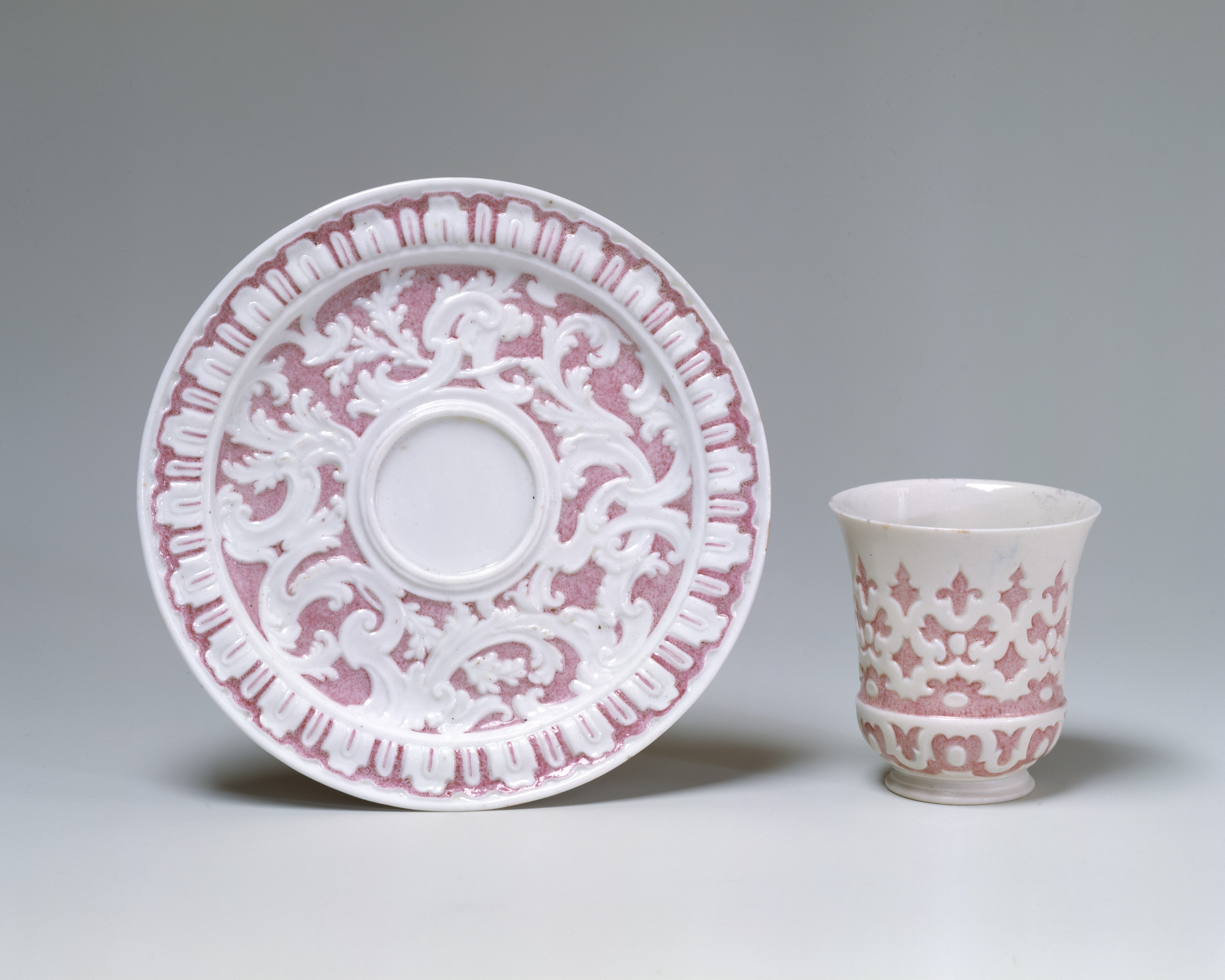
Beaker and saucer with carved design, c. 1743

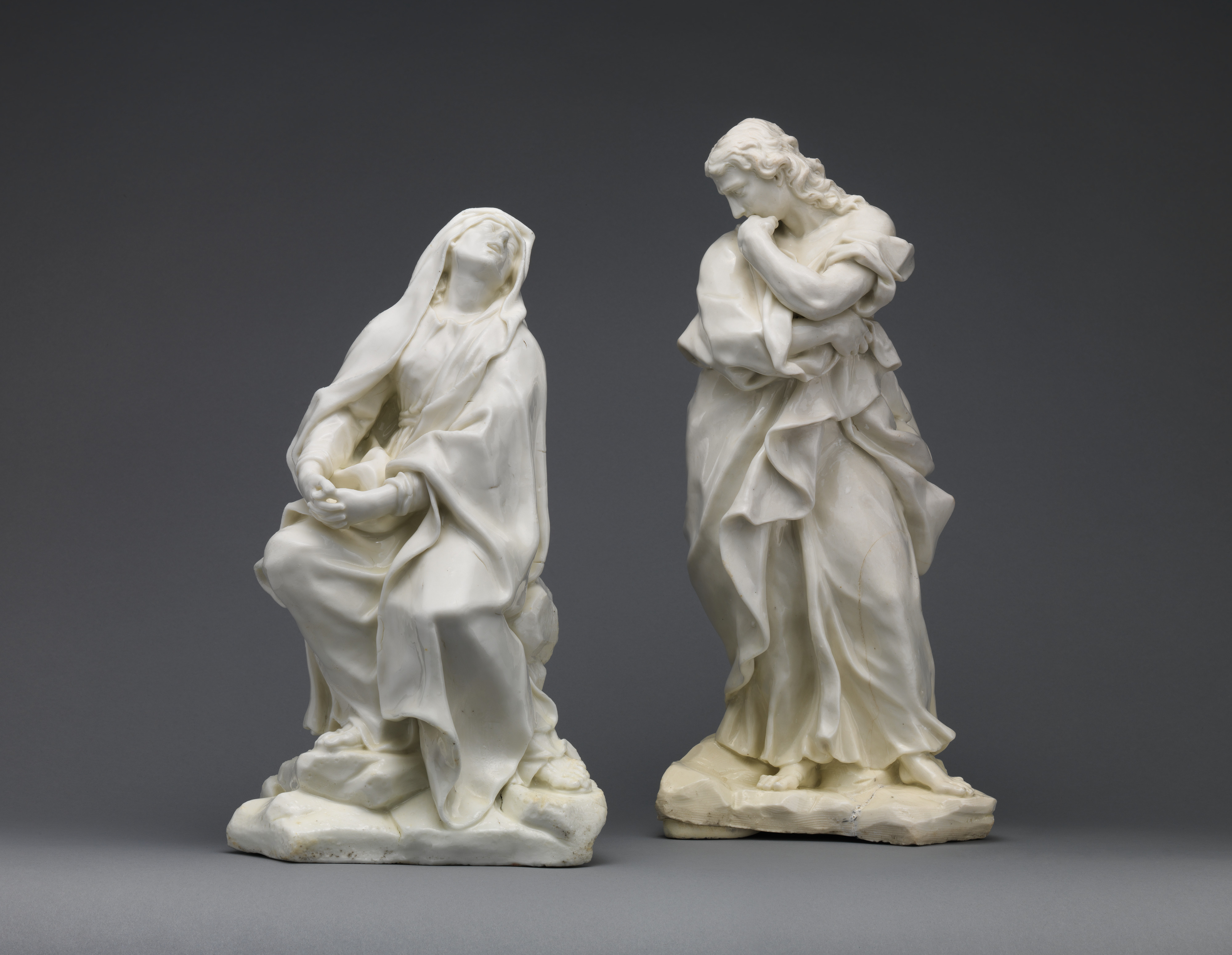
Mater Dolorosa and Saint John the Evangelist (18 inches or 46.4 cm high) from a Crucifixion group, Gricci, c. 1744

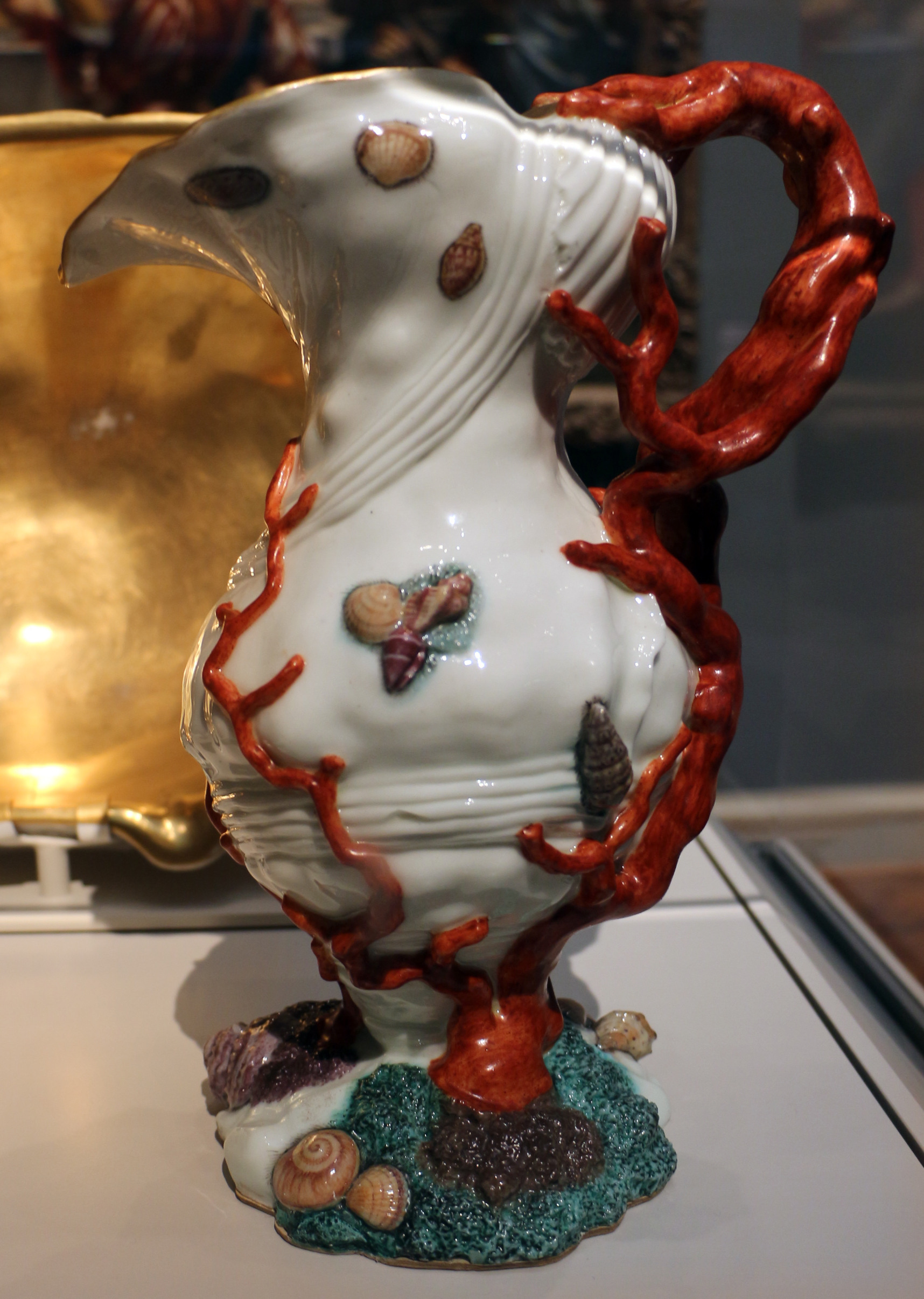
Ewer with coral and seashells, with the gilded interior of its basin behind, c. 1745

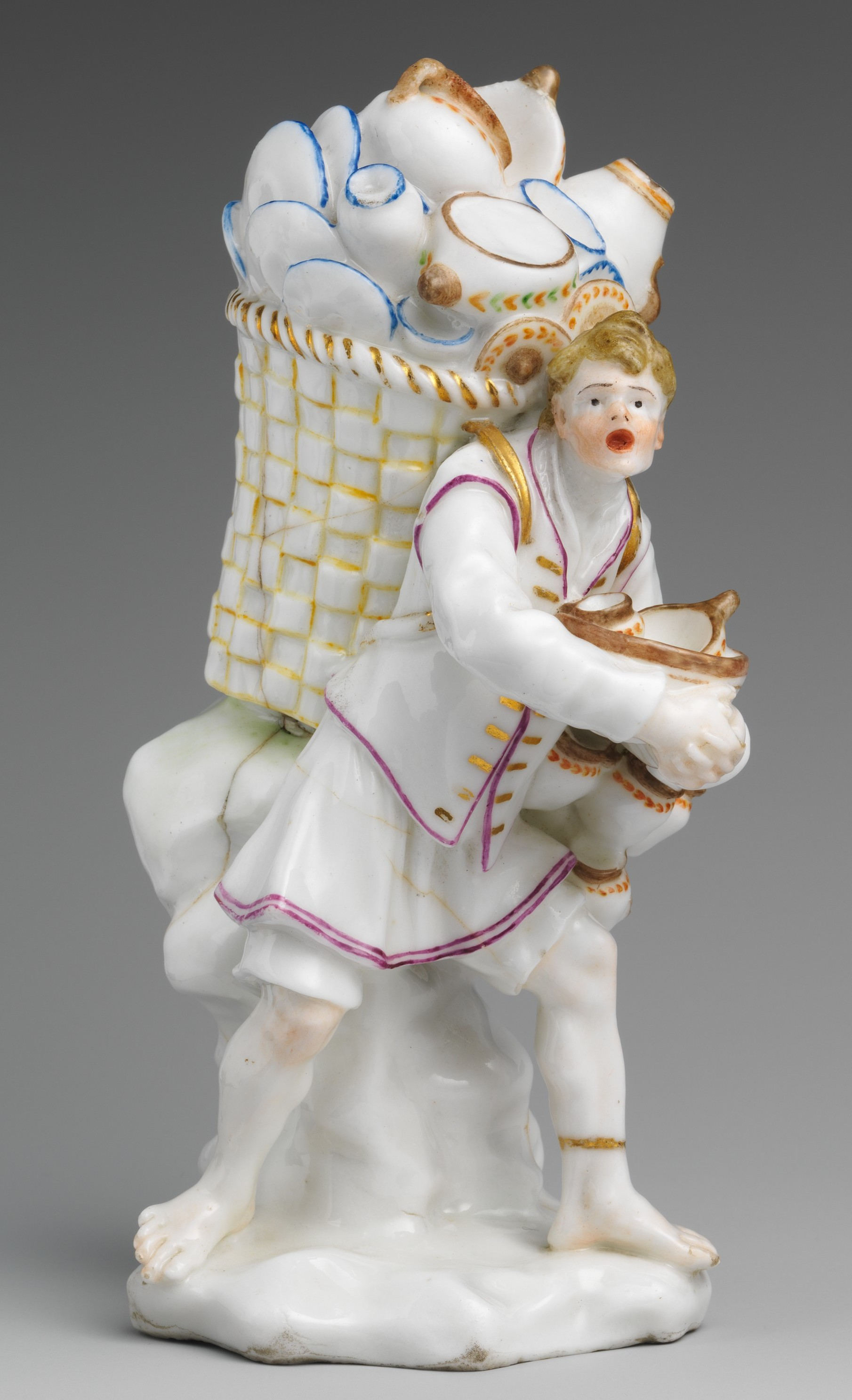
"Pottery seller" figure, c. 1745, based on a print after Annibale Carracci

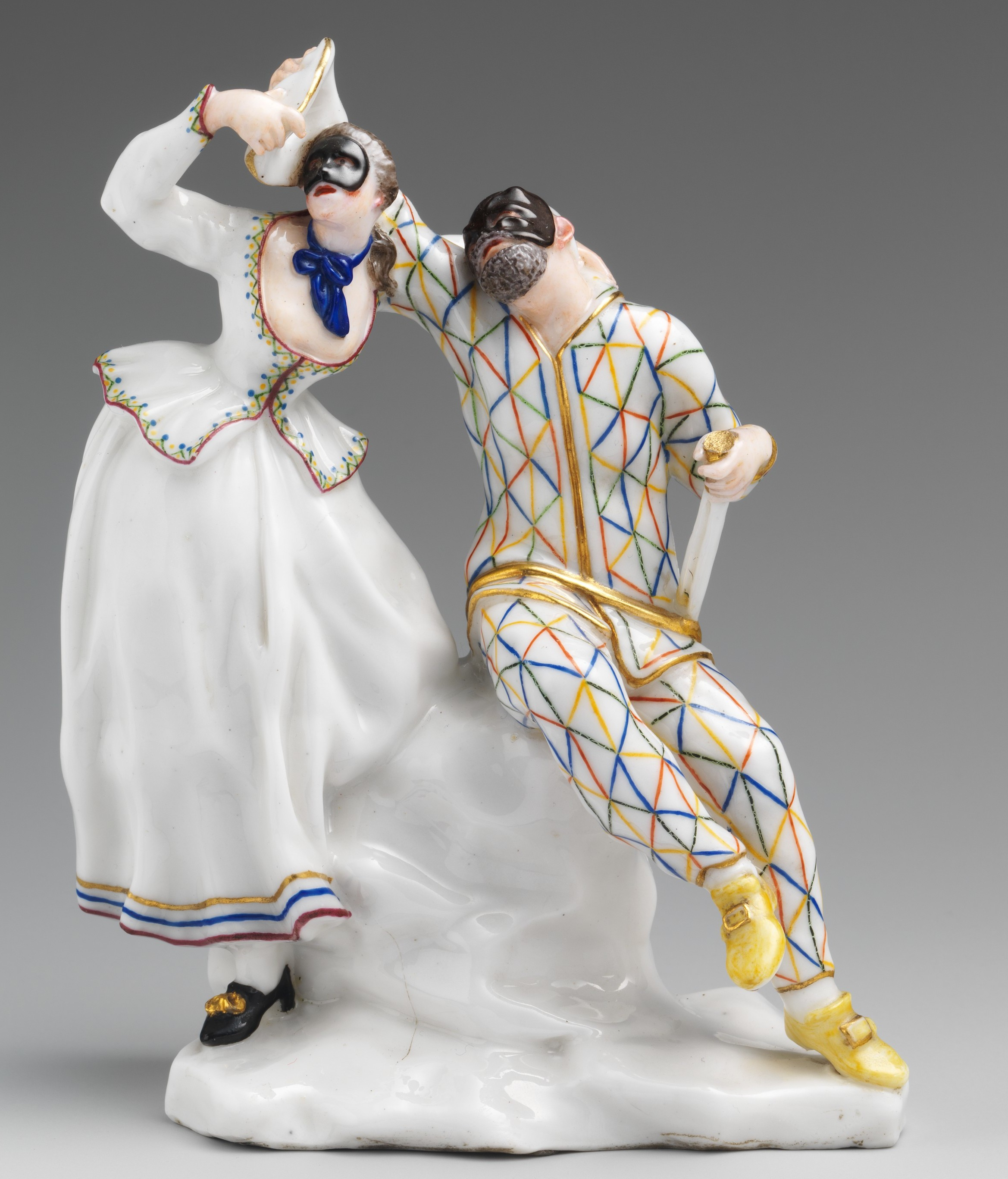
Harlequin and Columbine, c. 1745

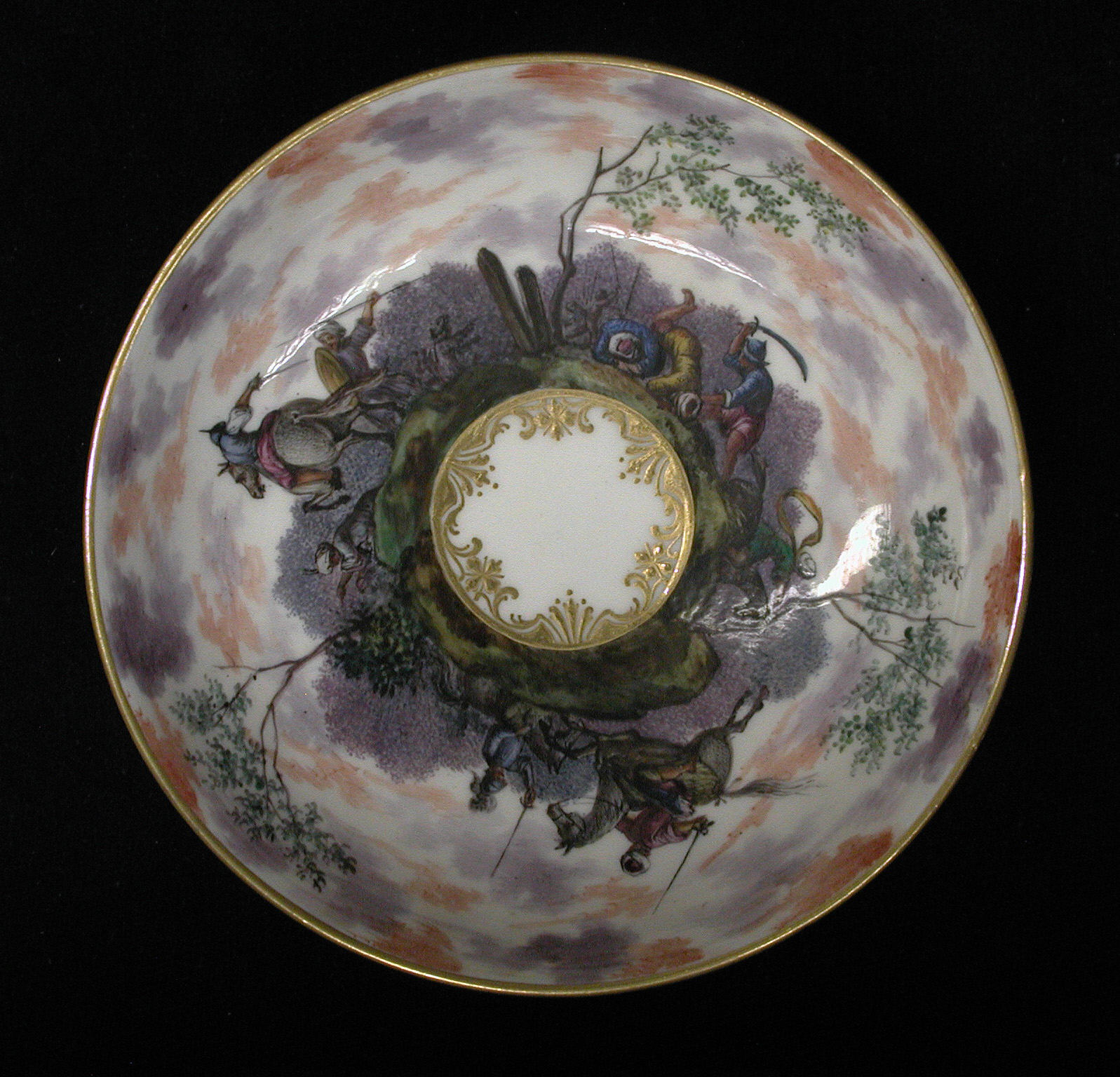
Saucer with fighting Orientals, from a tea and coffee service

Cup with relief prunus blossom, imitating Chinese styles.

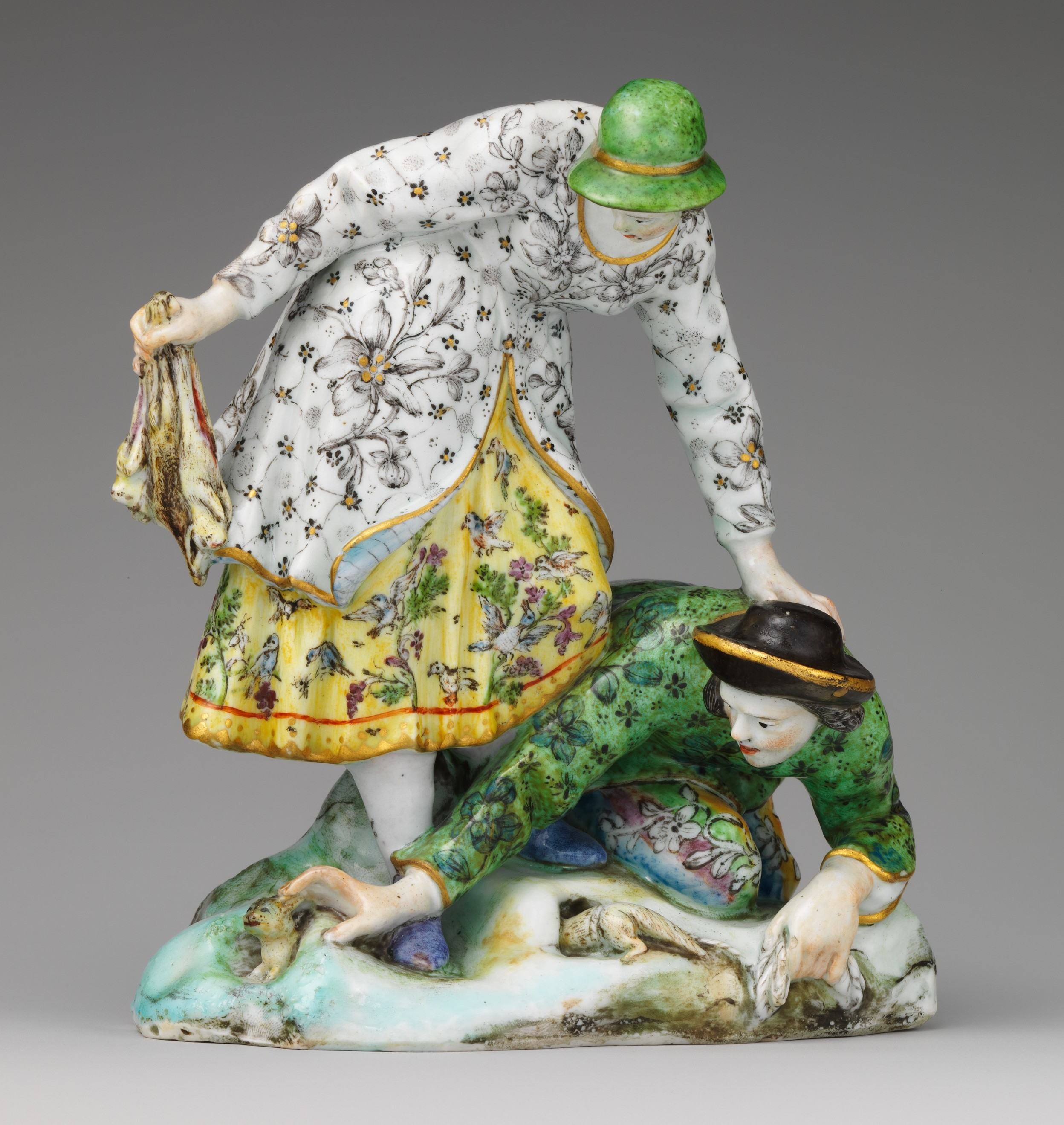
Rabbit Catchers, 1755–1759

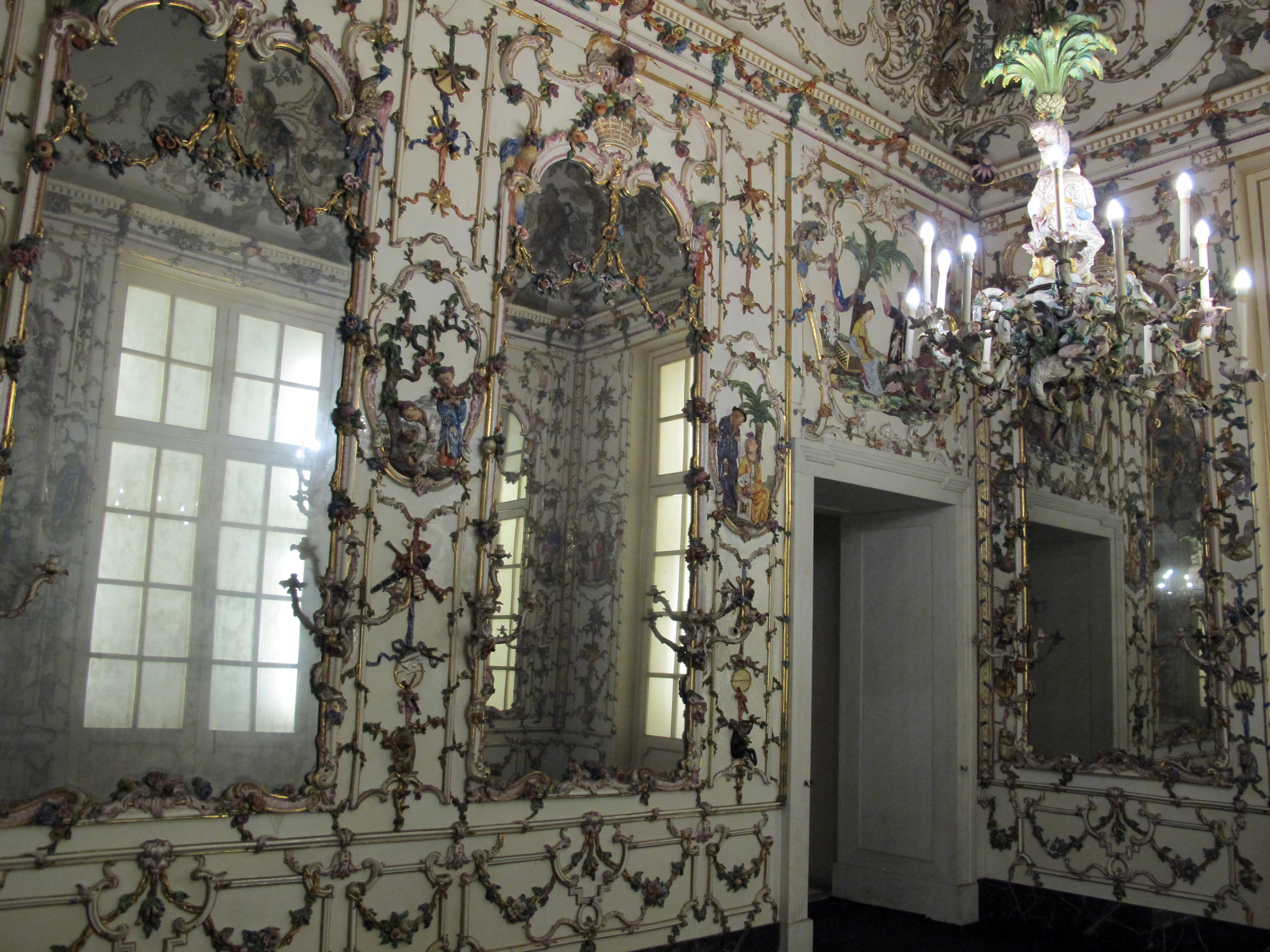
The porcelain room now at Capodimonte, c. 1757–1759

=== Naples, 1771–1806 ===
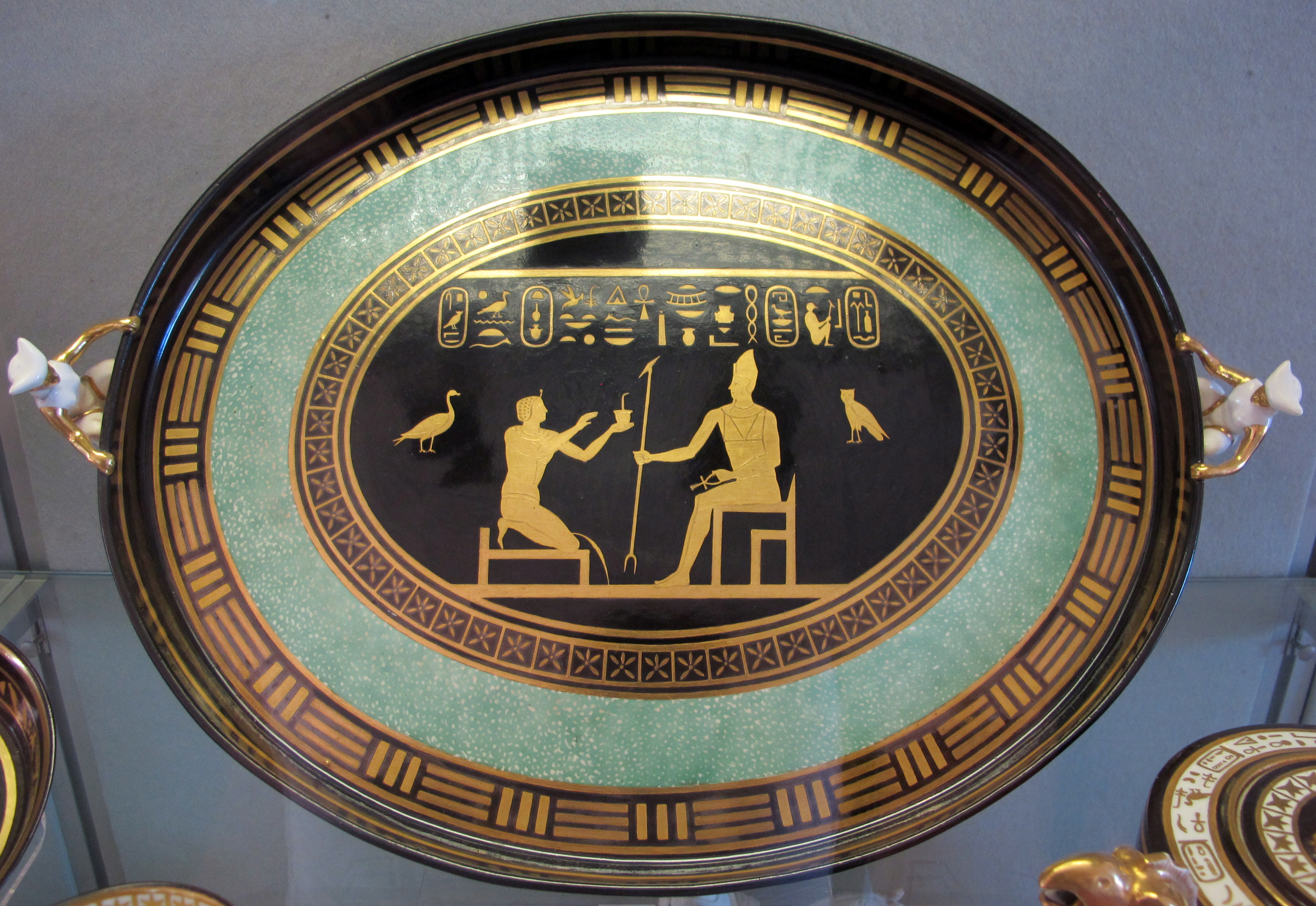
Part of an Egyptian service, 1790s

The revived Naples factory made a similar range of products to the old Capodimonte factory, with a similar soft-paste, which they had to largely rediscover. They made many genre figures, and table ware. Figures of the old subjects from street life now used more conventional proportions, and were more fully painted. Styles were affected by a general European change of taste towards Neoclassicism, intensified by the local interest as the continuing excavations at Pompeii, Herculaneum and other sites near Naples became well known. Table services were produced in a variety of revival styles, including Roman, Egyptian and "Etruscan", the last drawing from the imported ancient Greek vases being recovered from Etruscan tombs, and then thought to be Etruscan art. From 1782 the director of the factory was Domenico Venuti, whose father Marcello Venuti was in charge of the royal collection of antiquities, then at the Palace of Portici.

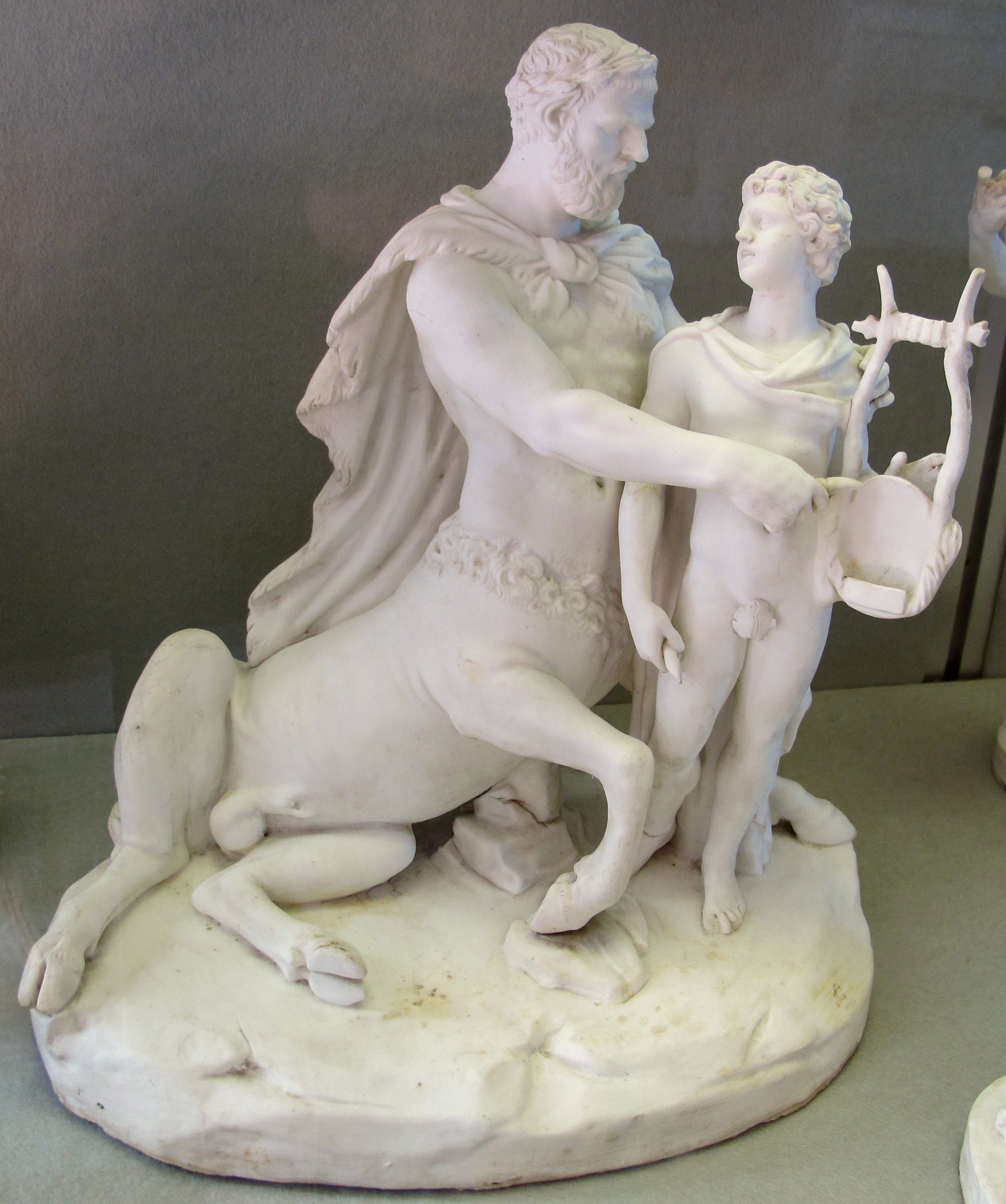
Achilles being taught to play the lyre by the centaur Chiron, biscuit, after 1785

From the 1790s there was also a large production of figures in unglazed biscuit porcelain, which resembled marble. Many of these were rather loose copies of famous ancient sculptures, especially those in the rich royal collections, including portrait busts; the factory was allowed to borrow these to copy. A wall-painting of Achilles being taught to play the lyre by the centaur Chiron, removed from a house in Herculaneum by the 1750s, was becoming famous, and was reproduced both on a painted cup and as a biscuit figure group by the factory (the 1st-century Roman painting was in fact a rendering of a sculpture in Rome).

The Chiron and Achilles cup was part of the Servizio ercolanese ("Herculaneum Service"), an 88-piece service Ferdinand made to present to his father Charles in Madrid, taking the subjects of the designs from the discoveries at Herculaneum. This was the first of a series of large services made to be diplomatic gifts, and is now widely dispersed. A 25 cm plate sold for £20,000 in 2012. The large Servizio dell'Oca with views of the Naples area is on display in the Capodimonte Palace museum. Other biscuit figures were fanciful furry animals such as dogs and bears, showing off the roughened worked biscuit. As at some other factories in these decades, gilding began to be used lavishly.

A 21-inch (530 mm) high figure of Saint Joseph holding the Infant Christ was previously attributed to the Buen Retiro factory around 1765, until it was realized that it was a porcelain version of a statue by Giuseppe Sanmartino in Taranto Cathedral from 1790–92, thirty years after the Buen Retiro team left Italy. The modelling is now attributed to Gennaro Laudato, a Neapolitan sculptor, and at least one other porcelain group is attributed to him. Though unmarked, it is thought likely that the Naples factory produced them. The body appears to be terraglia, the Italian version of creamware.

Naples porcelain, 1771 to 1806

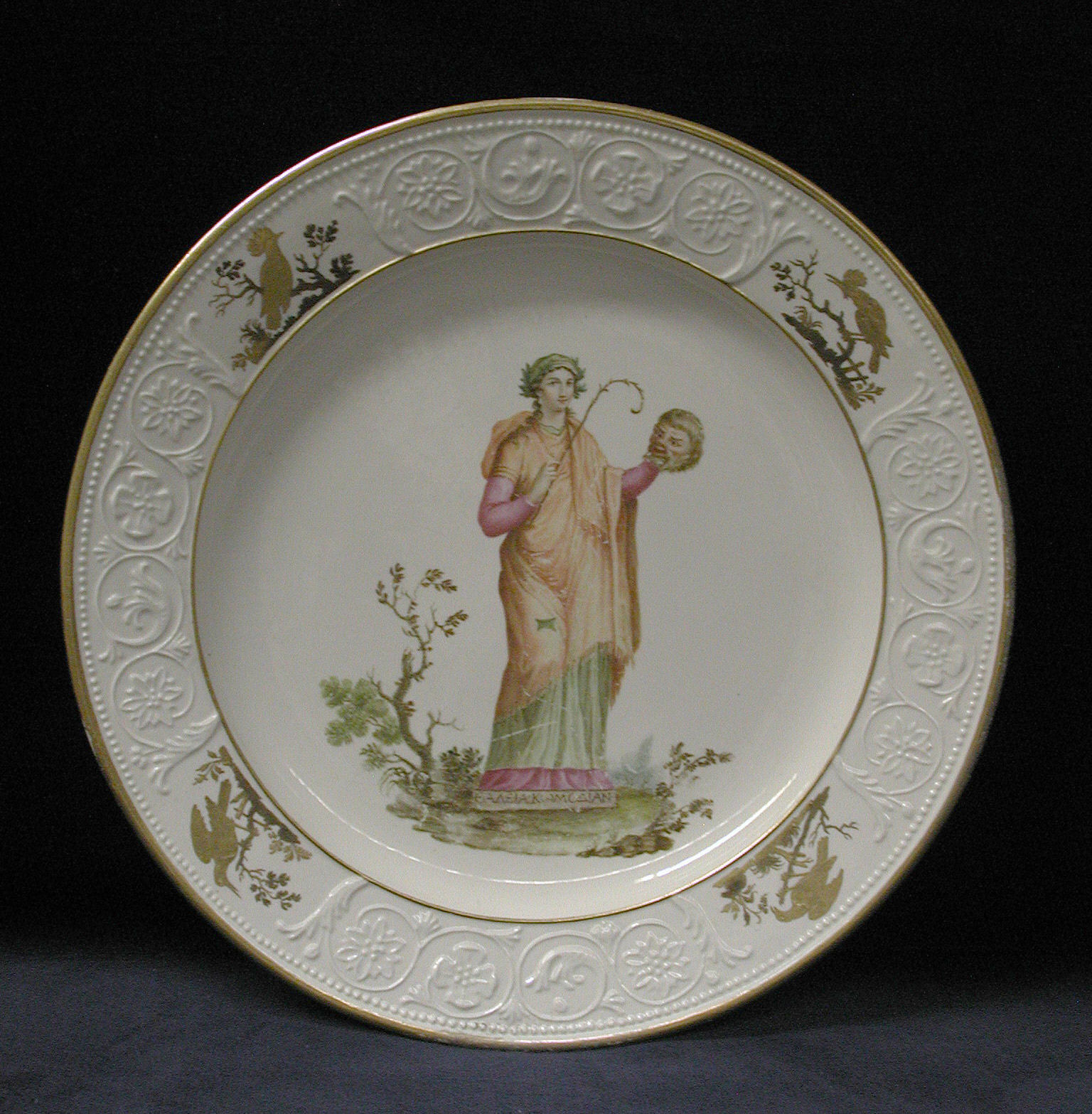
Neoclassical plate with Thalia, muse of comedy, from the Servizio ercolanese ("Herculaneum Service"), after a painting excavated there, 1780-82.

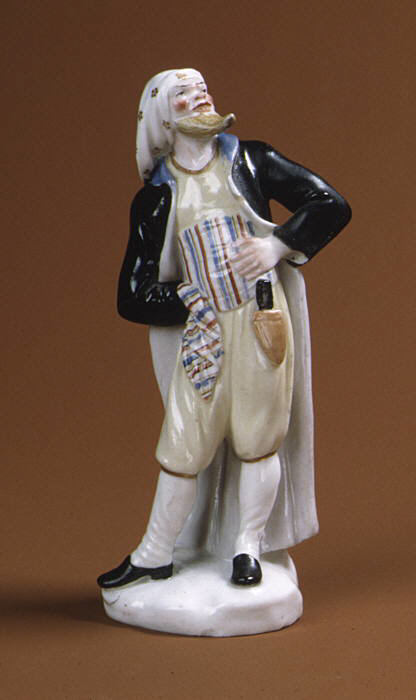
Figure of Pantalone, c. 1790

Neoclassical cup and saucer

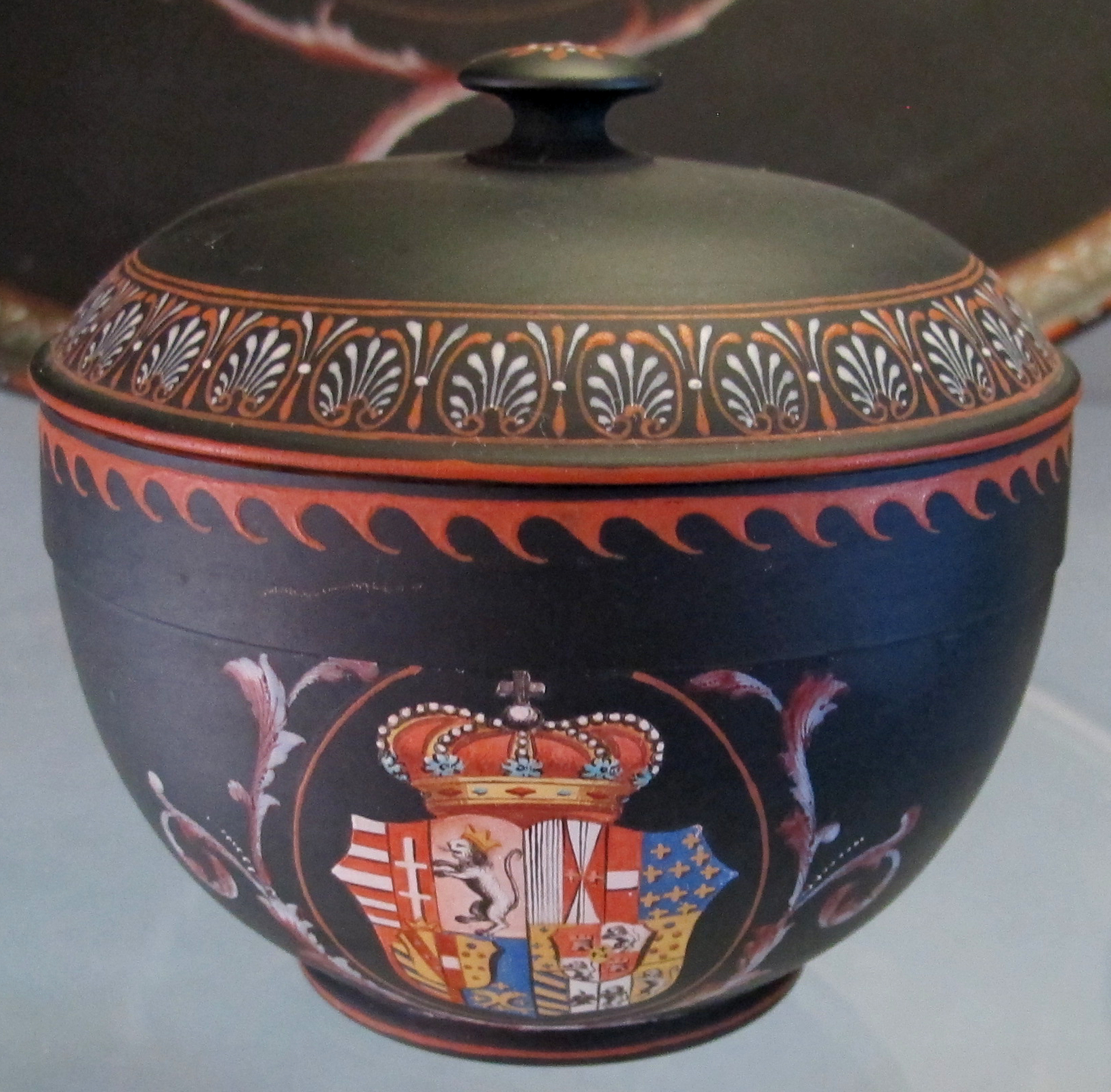
Bowl and cover from a service combining "Etruscan" style with the royal arms, c. 1790

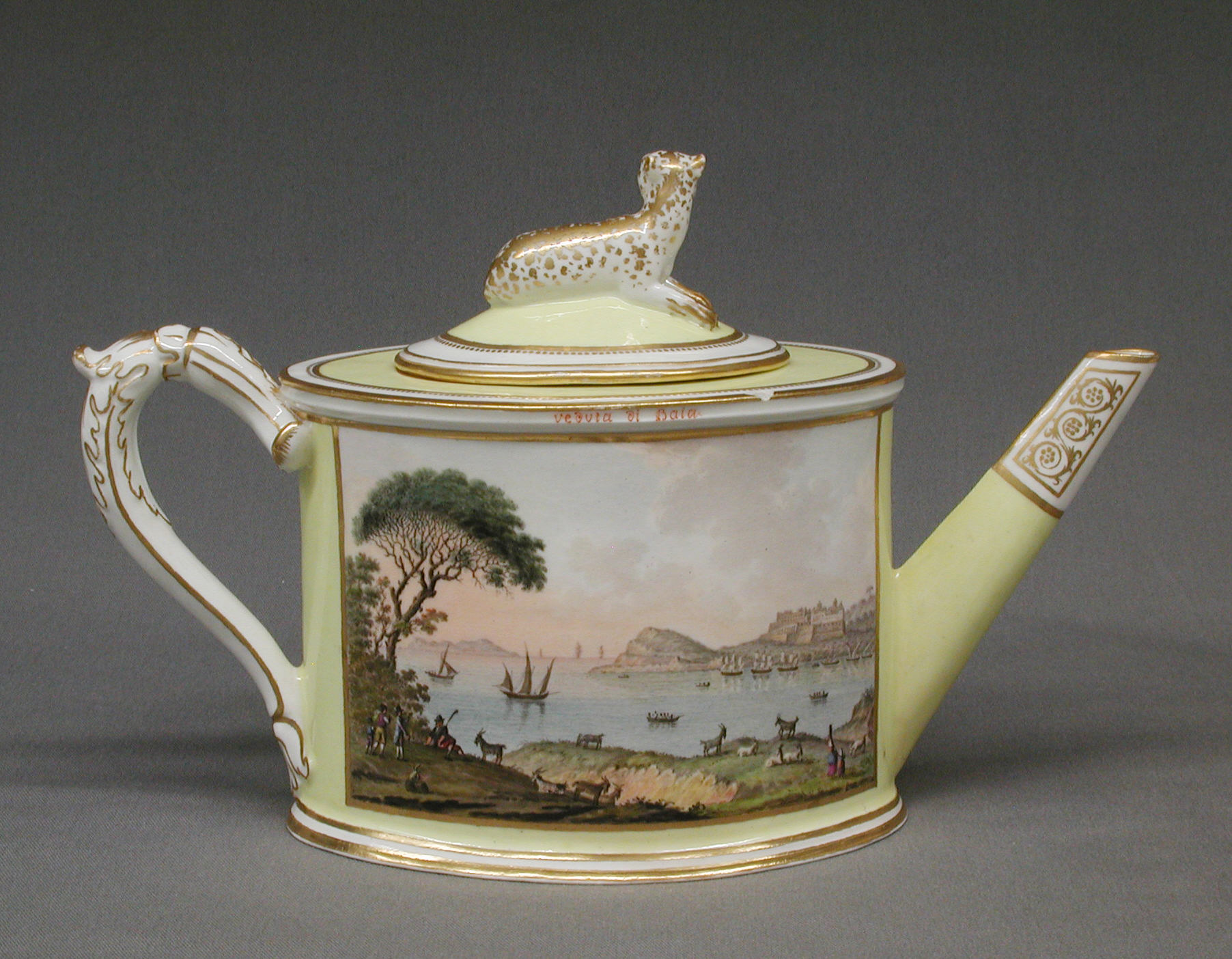
Teapot from a service with views around Naples - here Baiae, 1790s

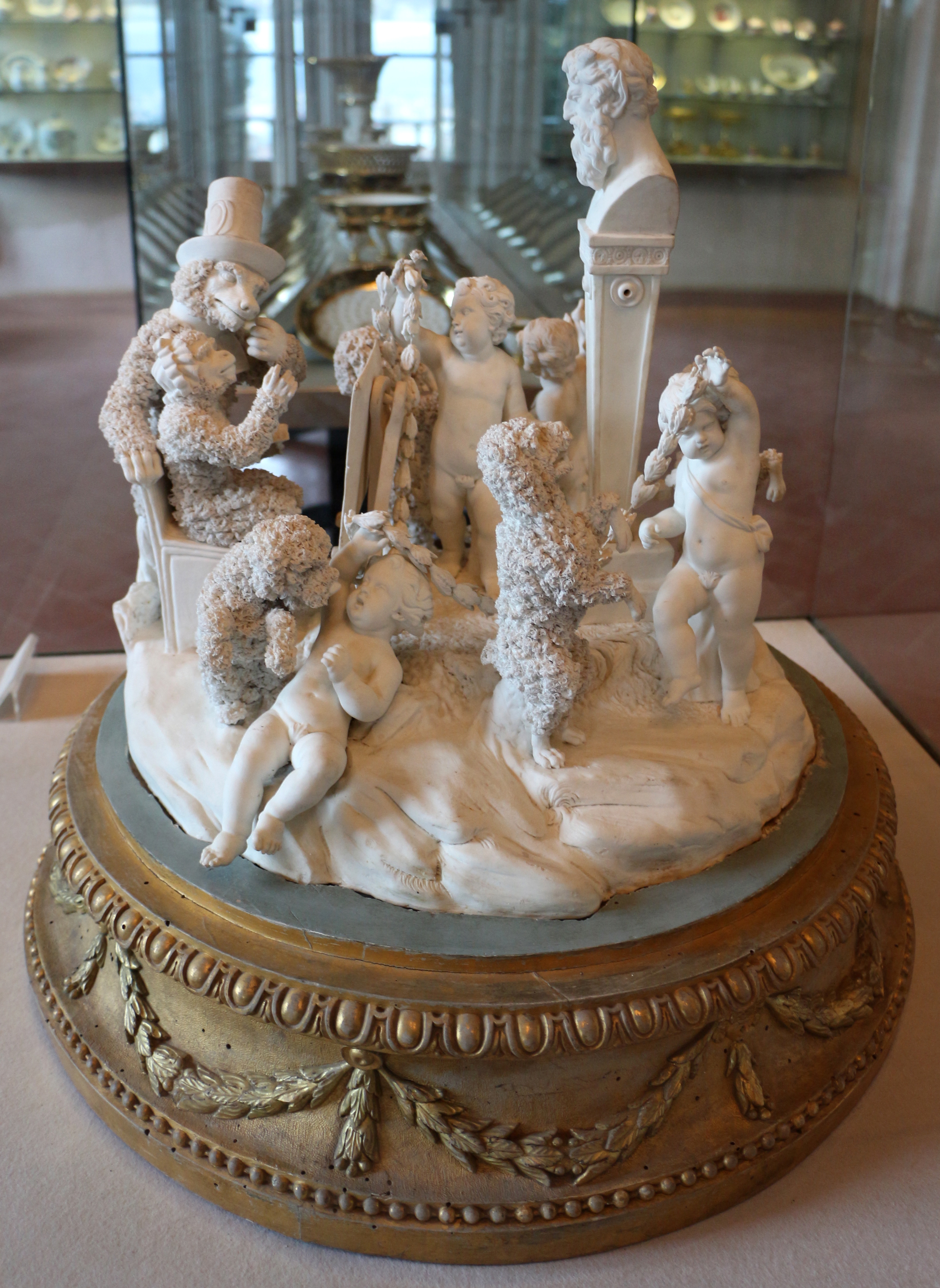
Group The School of Bears in raised biscuit porcelain, c. 1785

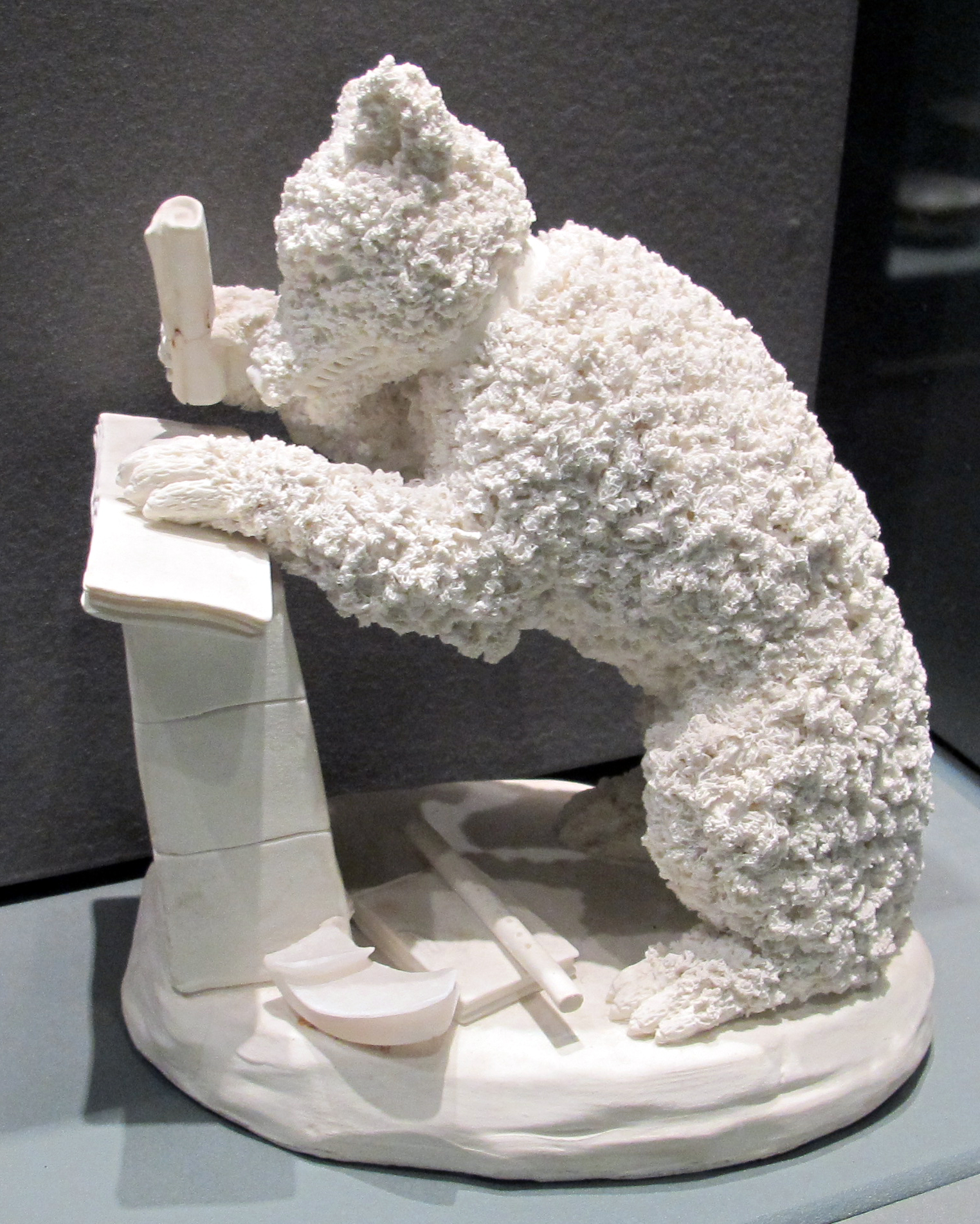
Bear in biscuit, from a group representing the Liberal Arts, 1790s

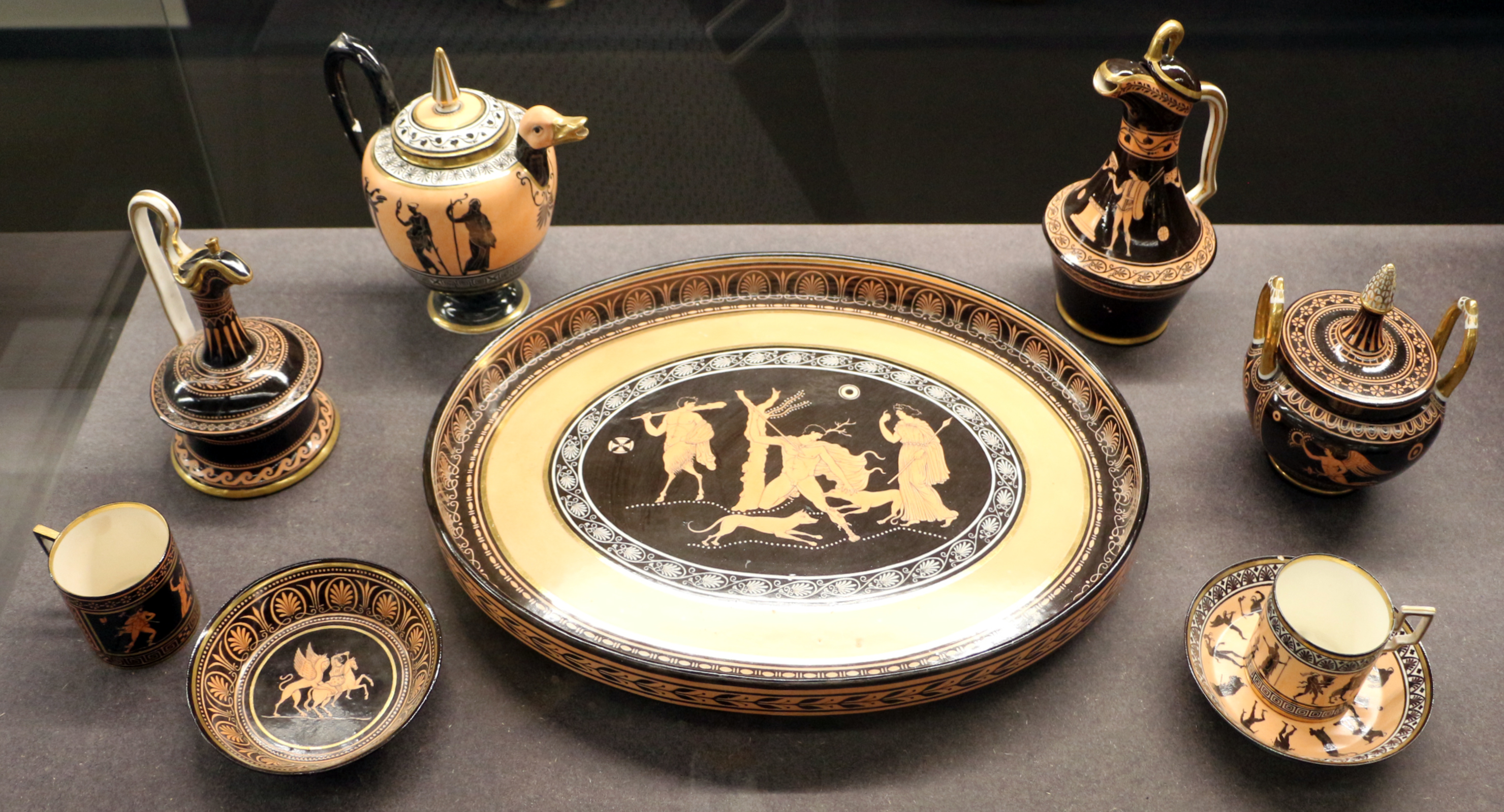
Group from a service in "Etruscan" style, 1790s

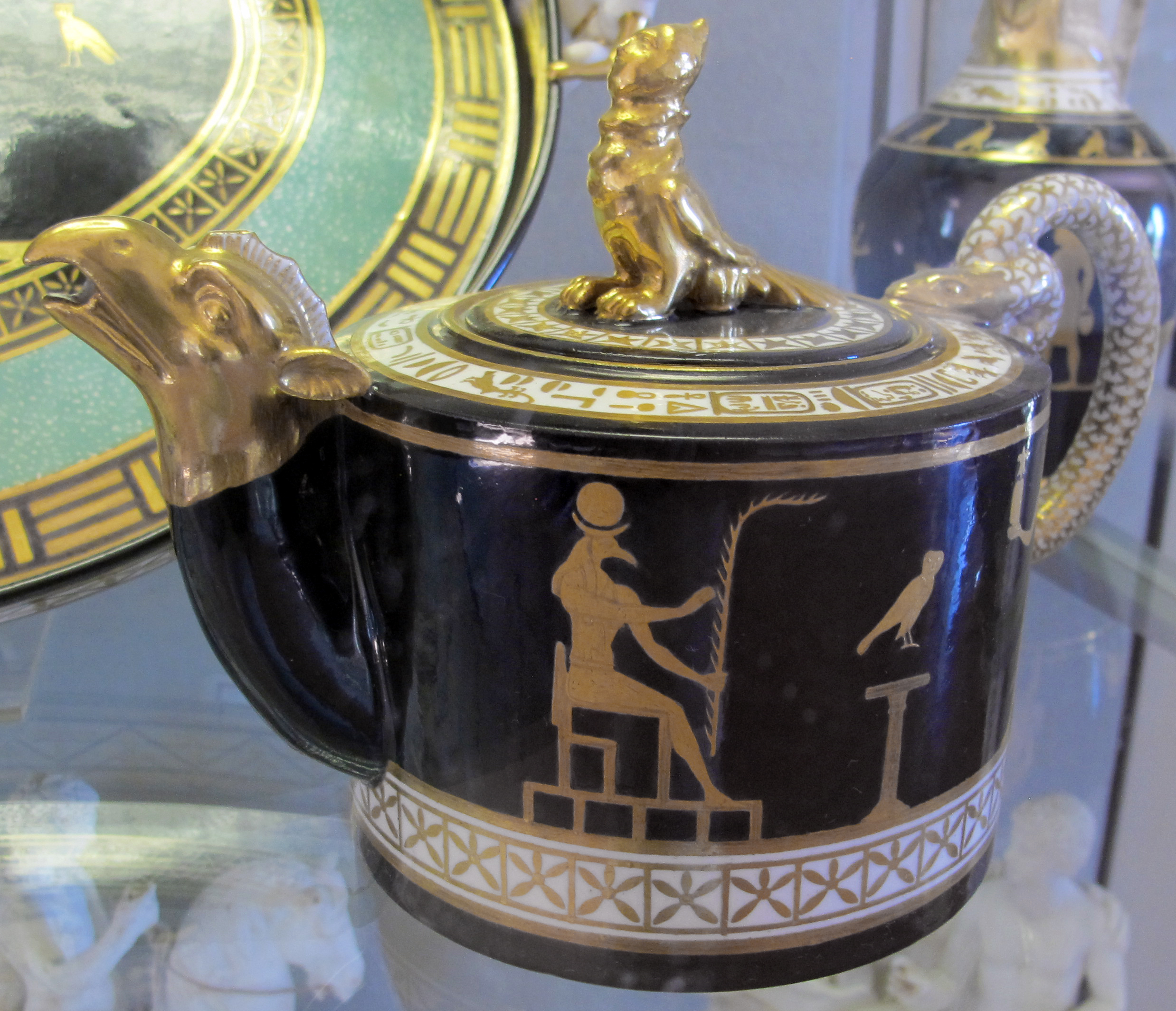
Teapot from a service in Egyptian style, 1790s

=== Later "Capodimonte" ===
The various factories whose wares were sold as "Capodimonte" from the early 19th century onwards mostly stuck to Victorianized versions of the 18th-century forms and styles. The Palace of Caserta displays some large and fussy vases, and figurine groups became large and complicated, still often wearing 18th-century costume. Baskets of flowers made in porcelain became popular, as did pieces in openwork "spagetto". In the 20th century a style of "raggedly dressed peasants of Walt Disney cartoon appearance" developed, along with "a sub-class of earthenware pieces, mostly boxes, of appalling quality with brassy gilding" but still with the crowned "N" mark.

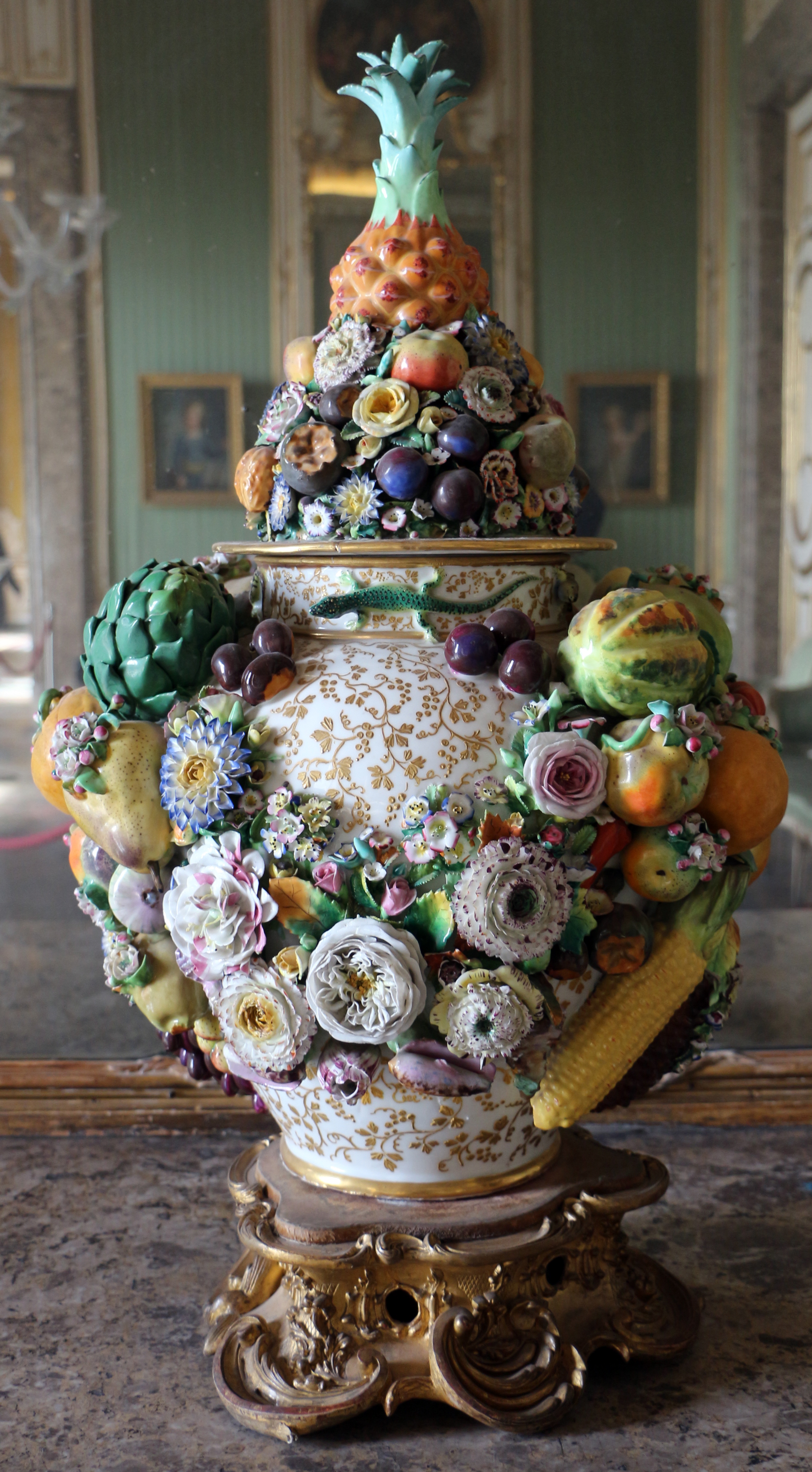
19th-century vase with modelled fruit and flowers, in the Royal Palace of Caserta

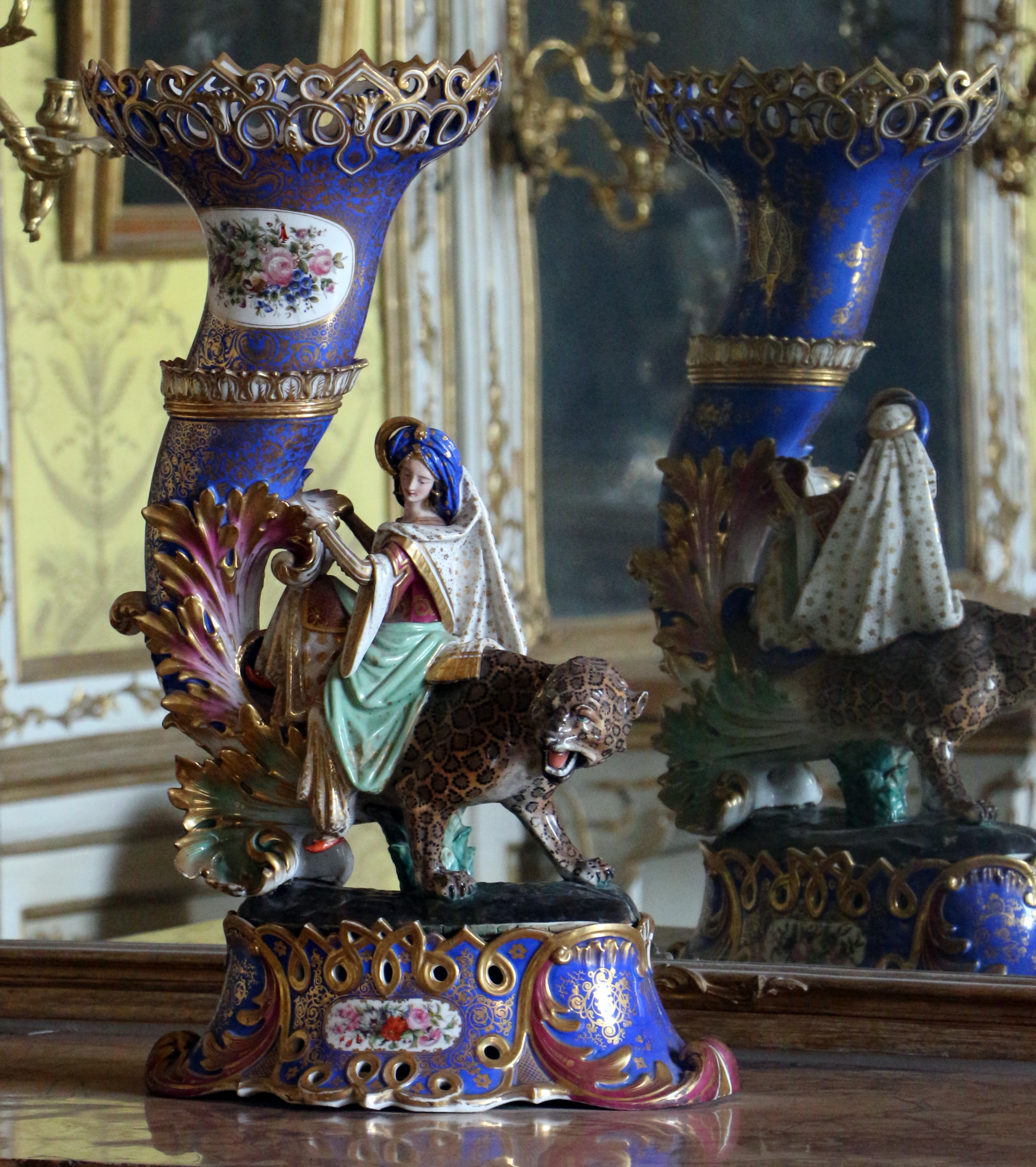
Vase with Oriental lady seated backwards on a leopard, at Caserta

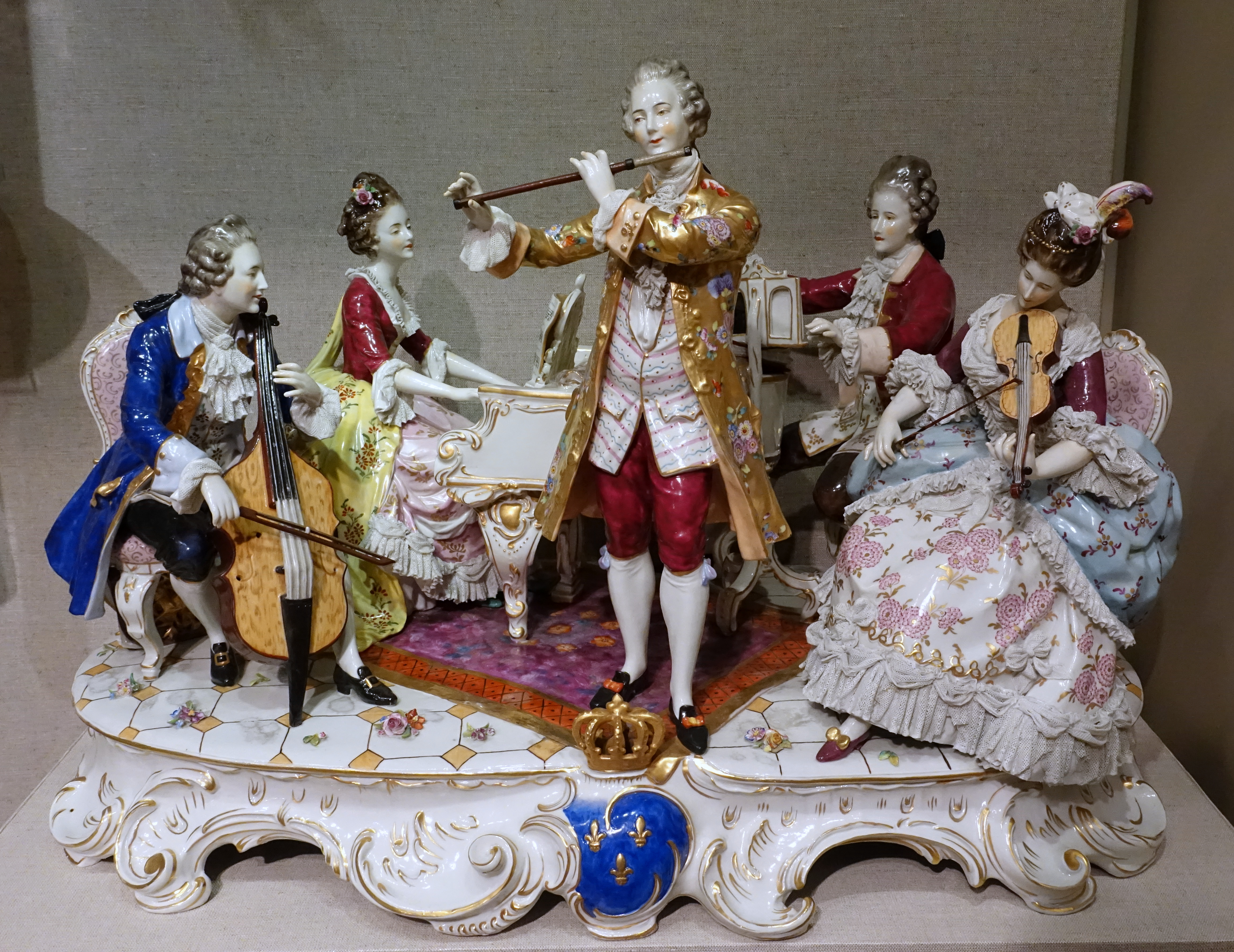
Group of musicians in 18th-century costume, late 19th to early 20th century

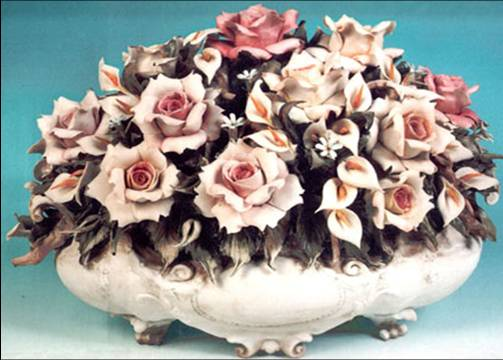
Majello basket of flowers

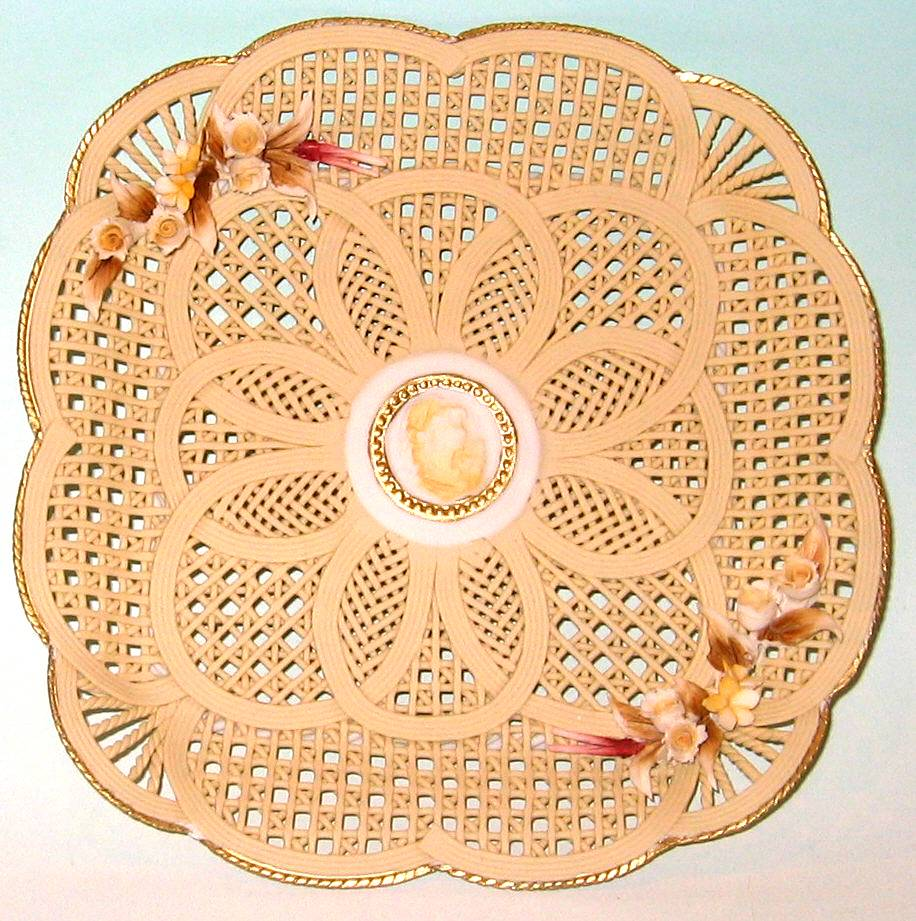
"Spagetto" tray, Majello
