= Sister Marie Majella Berg =

American educator and administrator

- Born: Mae Katherine Berg; July 7, 1916; Brooklyn, New York
- Died: April 5, 2004 (aged 87); Tarrytown, New York
- Occupations: nun, educator and administrator

Sister Marie Majella Berg (1916–2004) was an American Catholic nun in the order of the Religious of the Sacred Heart of Mary. She served as president of Marymount University from 1960 through 1993.

== Biography ==
Berg was born Mae Katherine Berg on July 7, 1916, in Brooklyn, New York. In 1934, when she was 18, she entered the Catholic order Religious of the Sacred Heart of Mary. She studied at Marymount College, Tarrytown, earning a bachelor's degree in Latin. She went on to earn her master's degree in classics from Fordham University.

Berg's educational career began in 1936 at the Marymount School of New York where she taught though 1948. She went on to teach at Marymount Manhattan College also serving as registrar. From 1958 through 1960 she was the registrar of Marymount College, Tarrytown. In 1960 Berg was appointed the third president of Marymount College of Virginia now Marymount University in Arlington, Virginia. At the time, Marymount was a two-year women's college During her tenure Marymount expanded its curriculum to offer bachelor's degrees and master's degrees. Marymount became coeducational in 1986. Berg retired in 1993, serving as president for 33 years. She then became president emerita of the university.

In 1990 Berg was named "Washingtonian of the Year" by Washingtonian magazine. In 1993 she received the Pro Ecclesia et Pontifice medal from Pope John Paul II.

Berg died on April 5, 2004, at the Marymount Convent in Tarrytown, New York. At the time of her death Marie Majella Berg was the longest serving woman college president in the United States.

In 2006 Berg was honored by the Virginia Women in History, sponsored by the Library of Virginia and Virginia Foundation for Women.
