= Porcelain boudoir of Maria Amalia of Saxony =

Rococo interior in the Palace of Capodimonte

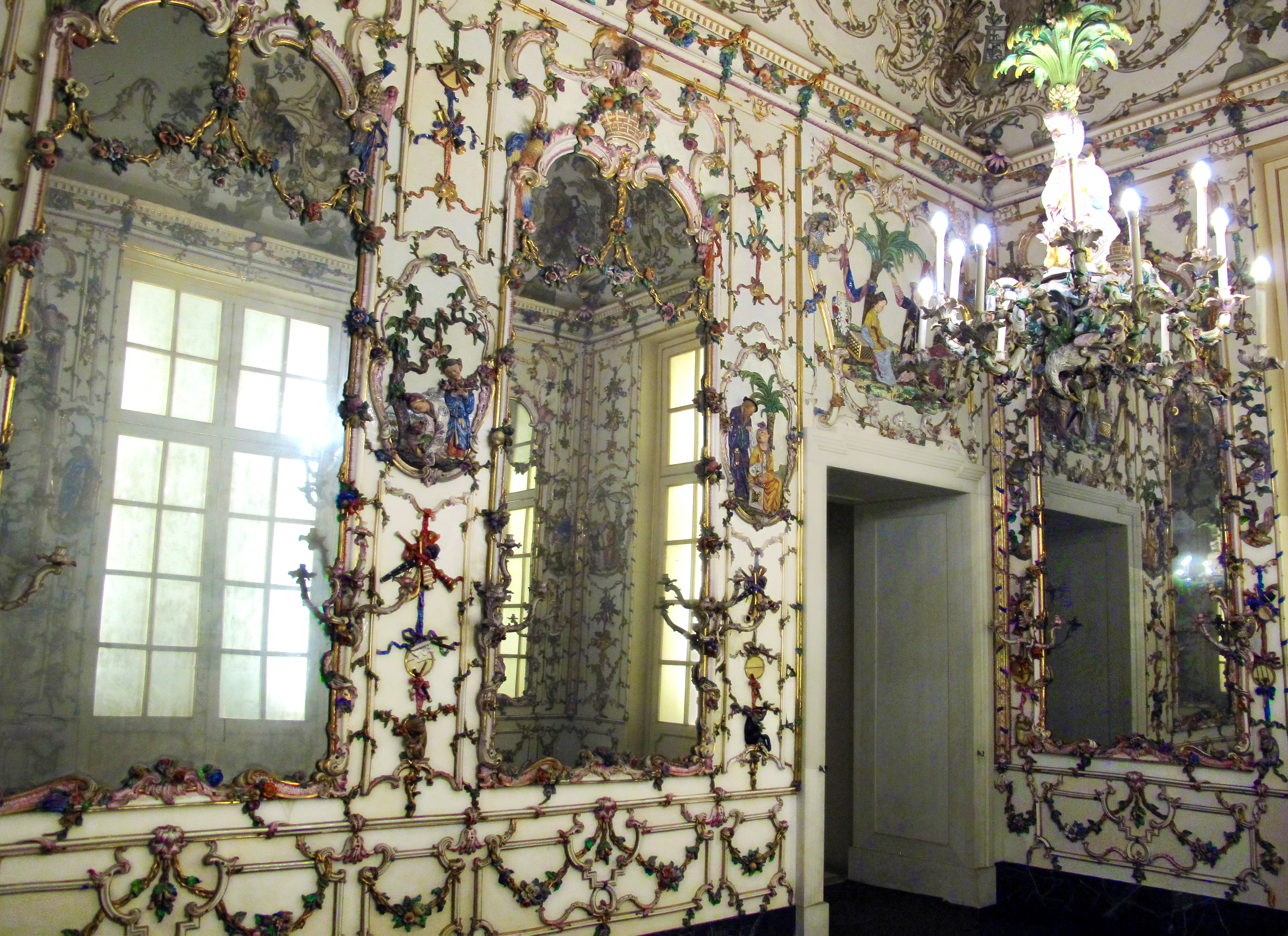
Part of the boudoir

The Porcelain boudoir of Maria Amalia of Saxony is a rococo interior now located in the Palace of Capodimonte in Naples. It was originally made for the Palace of Portici in 1757–59, but has now been moved to the Capodimonte Palace. It is named after Maria Amalia of Saxony, queen of Naples. It consists of white porcelain panels decorated in high relief with festoons and genre scenes, drawing on the Chinoiserie popular at the time. It was designed by Giuseppe Gricci (c. 1700–1770) and produced in the Royal Porcelain Factory of Capodimonte, founded by Maria Amalia and her husband Charles of Bourbon in 1743.

After Charles became Carlos III of Spain and moved the Capodimonte factory to Madrid as the Real Fábrica del Buen Retiro, similar rooms were made for the Palace of Aranjuez (also chinoiserie), and the Palacio Real, Madrid, this time in a Neoclassical style.

== Bibliography (in Italian) ==
- Hugh Honour, L'arte della cineseria. Immagine del Catai, traduzione di Maria Bosi Cirmeni, Firenze, Sansoni, 1963, SBN IT\ICCU\SBL\0135347.
- Silvana Musella Guida (a cura di), Porcellane di Capodimonte. La real fabbrica di Carlo di Borbone 1743-1759, Napoli, Electa, 1993, ISBN 88-435-4646-5.
- Alvar González-Palacios, Il tempio del gusto. Le arti decorative in Italia fra classicismi e barocco, Vicenza, Neri Pozza, 2000, ISBN 88-7305-767-5.
- Orietta Rossi Pinelli, Il secolo della ragione e delle rivoluzioni. La cultura visiva nel Settecento europeo, Torino, Utet, 2000, ISBN 88-02-05579-3.
- Silvana Musella Guida, Precisazioni sul salottino di Portici, in Antologia di Belle Arti, nº 5, 1978.
