= Palace of Capodimonte =

Museum in Naples, Italy

Coordinates: 40°52′01.22″N 14°15′01.92″E

Royal Palace of Capodimonte
- Reggia di Capodimonte
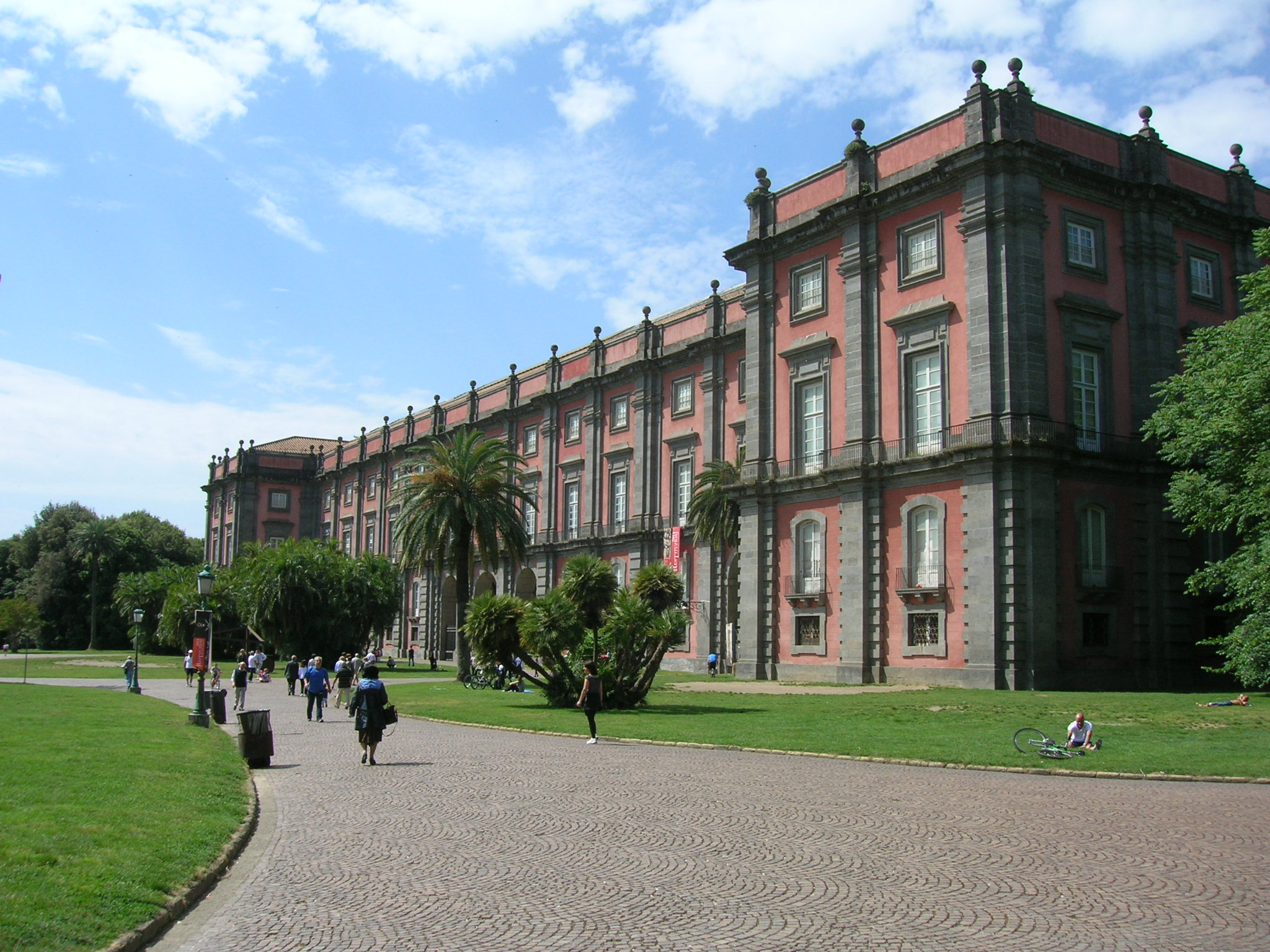
- Royal Palace of Capodimonte façade
- Interactive map of the Royal Palace of Capodimonte area

General information
- Status: Now used as a museum, National Gallery
- Type: Palace
- Architectural style: Italian Baroque, Neo-Classical
- Location: Via Miano 2, 80132 Naples, Italy
- Construction started: 1738
- Completed: 1742
- Client: Charles III of Spain

Technical details
- Floor count: 3

Design and construction
- Architects: Antonio Canevari; Giovanni Antonio Medrano; Ferdinando Fuga; Antonio Niccolini

Website
- Museo di Capodimonte official website (in Italian)

The Royal Palace of Capodimonte (Italian: Reggia di Capodimonte) is a large palazzo in Naples, Italy. It was formerly the summer residence and hunting lodge of the Bourbon kings of the Two Sicilies, one of the two royal palaces in Naples. Today, the main building holds the main Neapolitan museum for paintings, and much other post-ancient art, in the National Museum of Capodimonte. This has the best collection of paintings from the distinct tradition of Neapolitan art, and also many works from the Farnese Collection.

The palace was constructed on its somewhat cooler hilltop location (Capodimonte means "top of the hill") just outside the city, with urban Naples ultimately expanding around it. The large park (Real Bosco or "royal woods") is under the same administration, and hosts events such as concerts.

== History ==
In 1738, King Charles VII of Naples and Sicily (later King Charles III of Spain) decided to build a hunting lodge on the Capodimonte hill. He then decided that he would instead build a grand palace, partly because his existing residence, the Palace of Portici, was too small to accommodate his court, and partly because he needed somewhere to house the fabulous Farnese Collection which he had inherited from his mother, Elisabetta Farnese, last descendant of the sovereign ducal family of Parma.

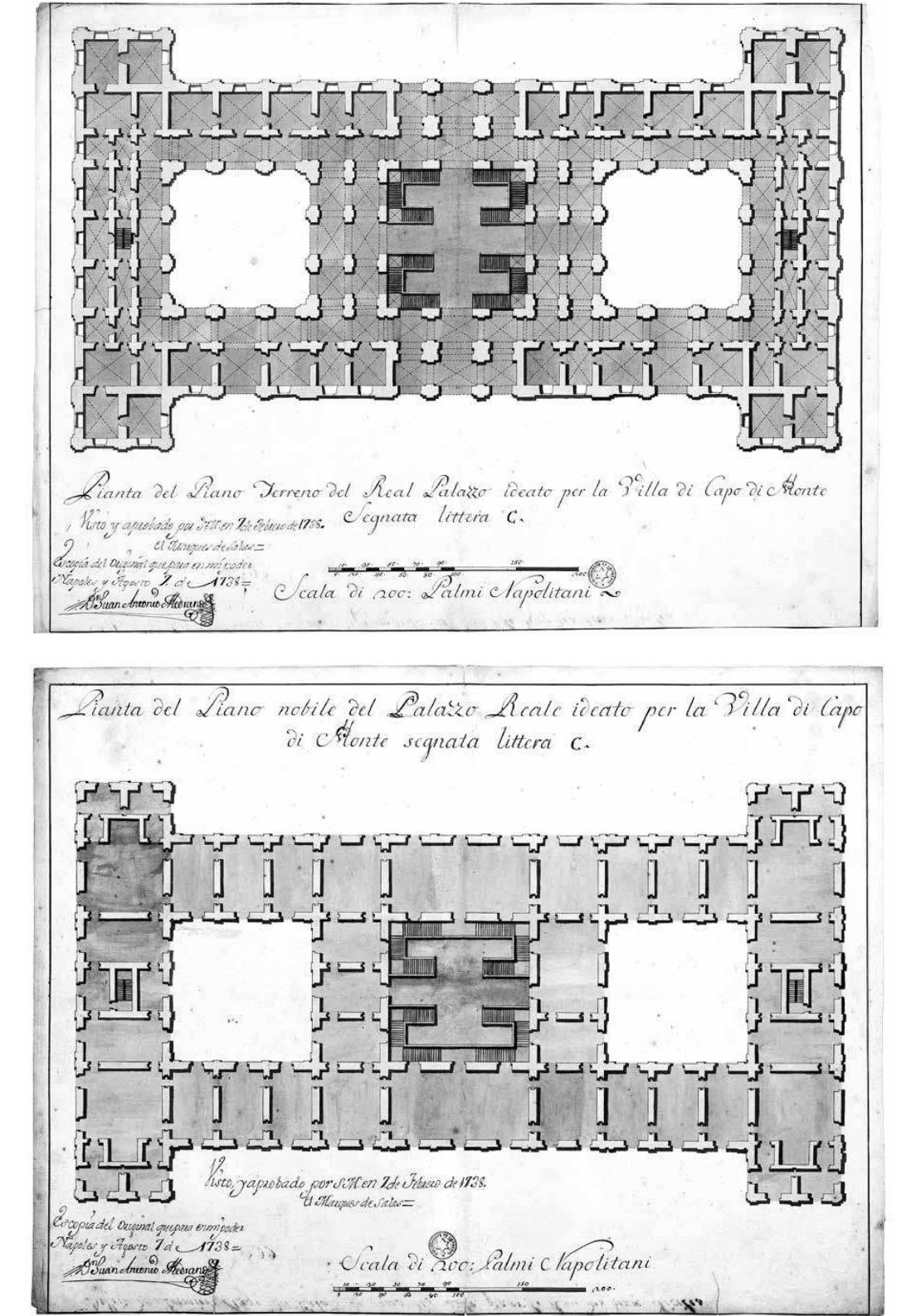
Façade or Elevation of the Royal Palace designed for the Villa of Capo di Monte, 1738, signed by Giovanni Antonio de Medrano (bottom left). Paris, Bibliothèque nationale de France, département Arsenal

He commissioned Angelo Carasale, Giovanni Antonio Medrano and Antonio Canevari to build it. However, after Canevari failed to come up with a design for ten months, Medrano began his work. Medrano's design began construction in August 1738, but it was to take more than a century to complete, partly because of the difficulty of transporting piperno, the volcanic rock used, from the quarries in Pianura. Since all surviving drawings bear Giovanni Antonio Medrano’s signature, most scholars give him complete credit. Moreover, the façade bears little in common with Canevari’s oeuvre. Its sober articulation adheres more closely to Herrerian monuments in Spain and the output of the royal military engineer and architect Giovanni Antonio Medrano. Architectural borrowing was never neutral, and at Capodimonte such features harmonized the palace with other royal buildings, thus casting it as a member of a close-knit family of crown structures. The features drawn from Spain would seem to indicate that Medrano oversaw the design. He knew Spanish monuments well, renovated the Palazzo Reale, and designed the Teatro di San Carlo. Medrano probably designed the stairs, for their distinctive C-shape resemble the one he designed for the Teatro di San Carlo.

In 1758, the first part of the palace was opened and the art collection was brought in. In 1759, Ferdinand IV succeeded his father Charles and the following year he appointed the architect Ferdinando Fuga to oversee work on the palace and the grounds. In 1787, on the advice of Jacob Philipp Hackert, a laboratory for the restoration of paintings was created.

When the Parthenopaean Republic was declared in 1799, Ferdinand fled to Palermo on board Nelson's Vanguard, taking the most valuable items from the palace with him. What remained was looted by the French troops of General Jean Étienne Championnet who were billeted there. During the 9 years of French occupation (1806-1815), the palace was the residence of Joseph Bonaparte and then of Joachim Murat. The art collection was transferred to the Naples National Archaeological Museum. When Ferdinand returned from Sicily in 1815, he employed many painters and sculptors to work on the decoration of the palace.

Francis I succeeded his father Ferdinand in 1825 and appointed the architect Antonio Niccolini to oversee work on the palace. Niccolini added monumental staircases, and new suites of rooms for the royal family, continuing work when Ferdinand II succeeded in 1830. The palace was finally completed in 1840, and a gallery housing contemporary art was added.

With Italian Unification, the royal palace passed in 1861 to the House of Savoy who used it as a residence and also added to the art collections, appointing Domenico Morelli as consultant for new acquisitions. They also added an extensive collection of historic firearms and other weapons. In 1866, the boudoir of Maria Amalia of Saxony was transferred to Capodimonte from the Palace of Portici, and in 1877 a Roman era marble floor was brought in from a Roman villa on Capri.

In the early 20th century, the palace became the residence of the Dukes of Aosta, a cadet branch of the House of Savoy. Then in 1920 it became the property of the Italian state. In 1950 it became a museum with many of the exhibits being returned from the National Museum.

== Interior ==
The first and second floors house the National Gallery (Galleria Nazionale).

Elsewhere in the palace the royal apartments are furnished with antique 18th century furniture and a collection of porcelain and maiolica from the various royal residences. The famous Capodimonte Porcelain Factory was just adjacent to the palace; it was started in 1743 by the Bourbon King Charles.

== Gardens ==
The palace is situated in the Bosco di Capodimonte ('Hilltop Wood'), now a park, which served as a royal hunting preserve.

== See also ==
- List of Baroque residences
