= Maria Christina of Austria =

Queen of Spain from 1879 to 1885

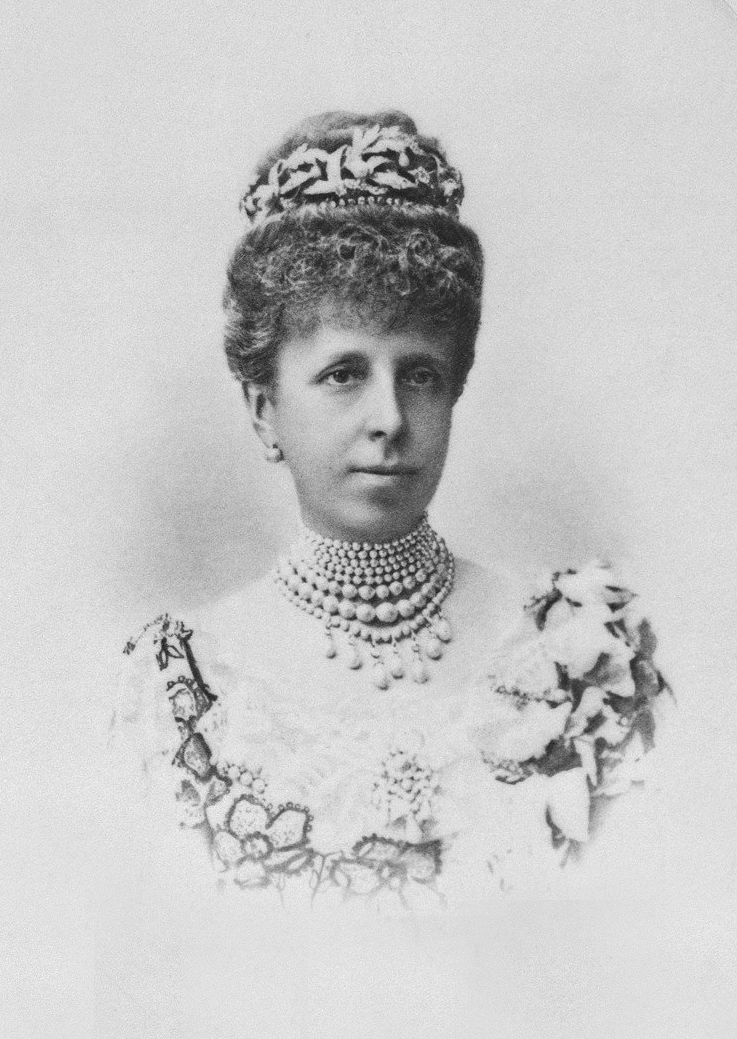
- Formal portrait by Franzen, 1906

Queen consort of Spain
- Tenure: 29 November 1879 – 25 November 1885

Queen regent of Spain
- Regency: 26 November 1885 – 17 May 1902
- Monarch: Alfonso XIII
- Born: 21 July 1858; Gross Seelowitz, Moravia, Austrian Empire
- Died: 6 February 1929 (aged 70); Royal Palace, Madrid, Kingdom of Spain
- Burial: El Escorial
- Spouse: Alfonso XII of Spain (m. 1879; died 1885)
- Issue: María de las Mercedes, Princess of Asturias; Infanta María Teresa; Alfonso XIII
Names
- Maria Christina Henriette Desideria Felicitas Raineria
- House: Habsburg-Lorraine
- Father: Archduke Karl Ferdinand of Austria
- Mother: Archduchess Elisabeth Franziska of Austria

Maria Christina of Austria (Maria Christina Henriette Desideria Felicitas Raineria; (Note: Also known as Maria Christina Henrietta Désirée Félicité Rénière) Spanish: María Cristina de Habsburgo-Lorena; 21 July 1858 – 6 February 1929) was Queen of Spain as the second wife of Alfonso XII. She was queen regent during the vacancy of the throne between her husband's death in November 1885 and the birth of their son Alfonso XIII in May 1886, and subsequently also until her son came of age in May 1902.

== Early life ==
Known to her family as Christa, she was born at Židlochovice Castle (Groß Seelowitz), near Brno, in Moravia, a daughter of Archduke Karl Ferdinand of Austria and his wife, Archduchess Elisabeth Franziska of Austria.

Her paternal grandparents were Archduke Charles of Austria and Princess Henriette Alexandrine of Nassau-Weilburg.

Various sources attributed good traits to Maria Christina before her marriage. One states she was "tall, fair, sensible, and well educated". She was Princess-Abbess of the Theresian Royal and Imperial Ladies Chapter of Prague Castle (1875–1879).

== Queen consort ==
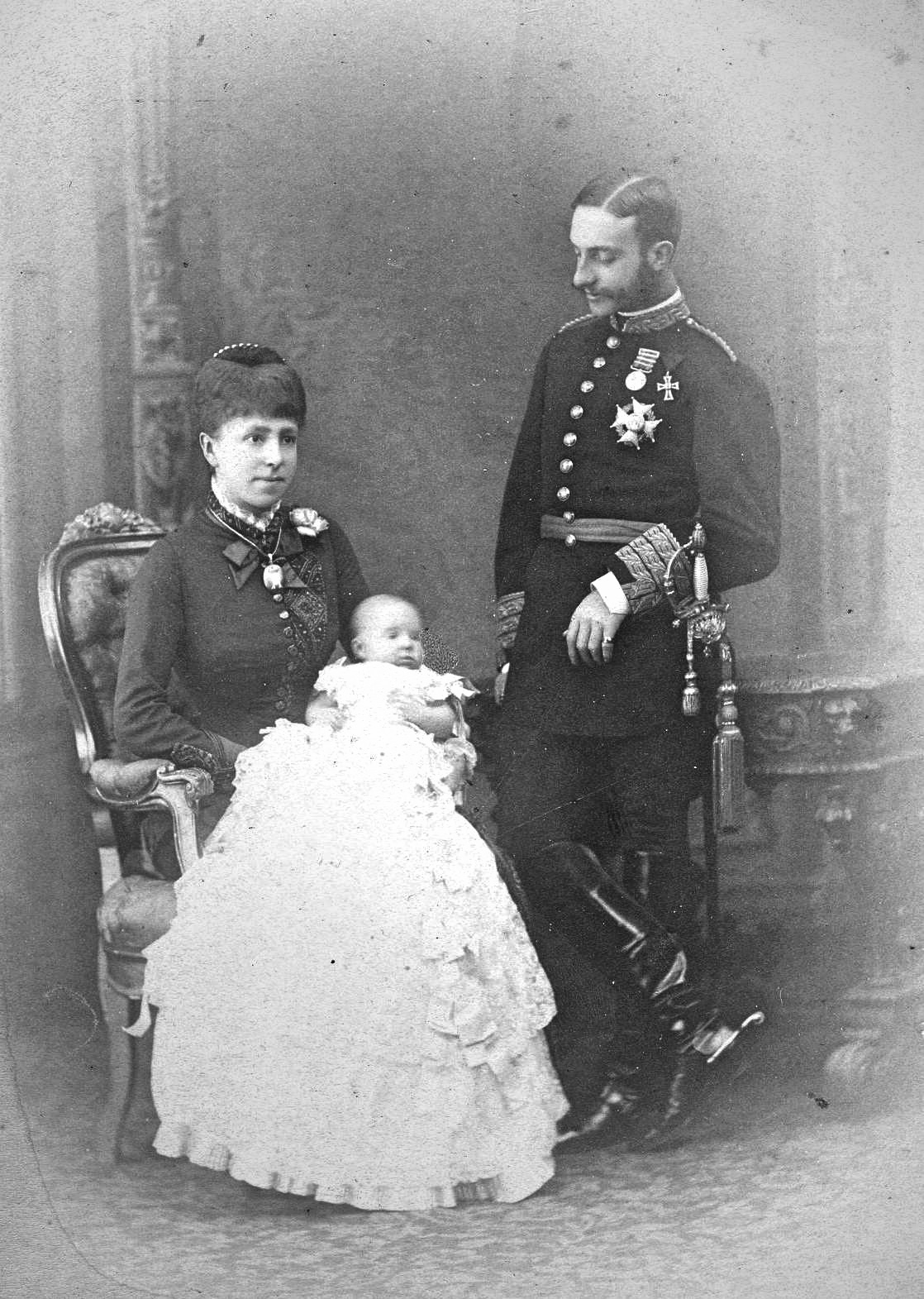
Maria Christina with Alfonso XII and the Princess of Asturias in 1880.

After the death of Queen María de las Mercedes in June 1878, King Alfonso XII was determined to remarry to produce an heir. The Queen had died childless just a few months after her marriage and negotiations started with the court of Vienna. In August, Alfonso XII traveled to Arcachon, Gironde, with the specific purpose of meeting Archduchess Maria Christina and her mother Archduchess Elisabeth. In this first meeting, the King proposed to her and she accepted.

In early September 1878, the Spanish Government approved the engagement and Emperor Franz Joseph asked his niece to officially relinquish her title of Abbess of the Theresian Convent of Prague as it was necessary for the future queen to abandon all her Austrian appointments. The proposal was gazetted in the Wiener Zeitung on 7 September: "His Majesty the King of Spain, during his visit to Arcachon, has requested the hand of the Most Serene Lady Archduchess Maria Christina... with previous consent of His Imperial and Royal Apostolic Majesty, as Chief of the Imperial Family, the Most Serene Lady Archduchess has accepted the said proposal".

In compliance with Article 56 of the Constitution of Spain, the Cortes passed a law granting a 500.000 pesetas annuity for the future queen consort on 2 November. The terms of the marriage were settled in an agreement executed between Austria and Spain in Vienna on 15 November by their respective plenipotentiaries. That same day Maria Christina renounced her succession rights to the Austrian throne before the Emperor and the court according to the tradition imposed to the archduchesses who were to marry a foreign prince. Another marriage agreement was signed in Madrid on 28 November by the King and Maria Christina themselves.

The wedding took place on 29 November 1879 at the Basilica of Atocha in Madrid. The arranged marriage (the second of Alfonso XII after the death of his first wife María de las Mercedes of Orléans), was concerted on the basis of the conservative profile espoused by the Austro-Hungarian Empire as well as by the prestige attained by the Habsburgs in their previous involvement in the history of Spain, and blocked the possibility of a prospective Austrian endorsement to the Carlist cause.

After giving birth to two daughters —María de las Mercedes (born 1880) and María Teresa (born 1882)— she ensured dynastic continuity, yet, with the threatening landmark for the ruling dynasty set by the previous Carlist Wars, she was still pressured to undergo a new pregnancy and give birth to a male child in order to consolidate the political system, as it was considered at the time.

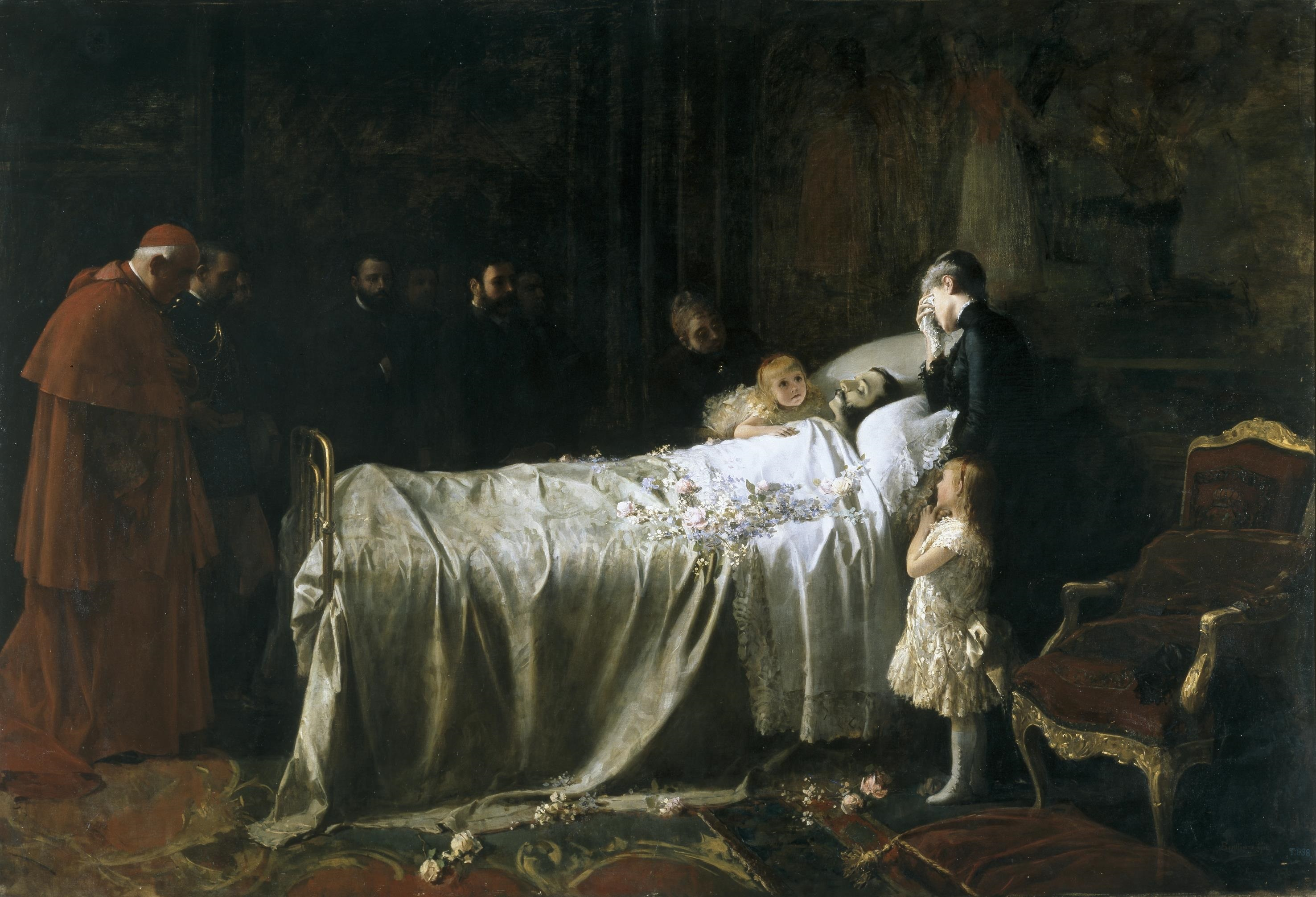
Death of Alfonso XII or The last kiss, by Juan Antonio Benlliure

She became pregnant again before the death of her husband in November 1885 (the king suffered from tuberculosis yet he led an active life). An attributed dying wish by Alfonso XII pleading to her is "Ya verás cómo todo se arregla providencialmente. Pero, si muero, guarda el coño y ándate siempre de Cánovas a Sagasta y de Sagasta a Cánovas" ("You will see how everything is going to be providentially fixed, yet if I die, keep your pussy at bay and always go from Cánovas to Sagasta and from Sagasta to Cánovas"). While possibly apocryphal, it is representative of the Restoration era. Months later, in May 1886, she would give birth to a male child, Alfonso, who reigned as Alfonso XIII upon his birth.

== Regency ==
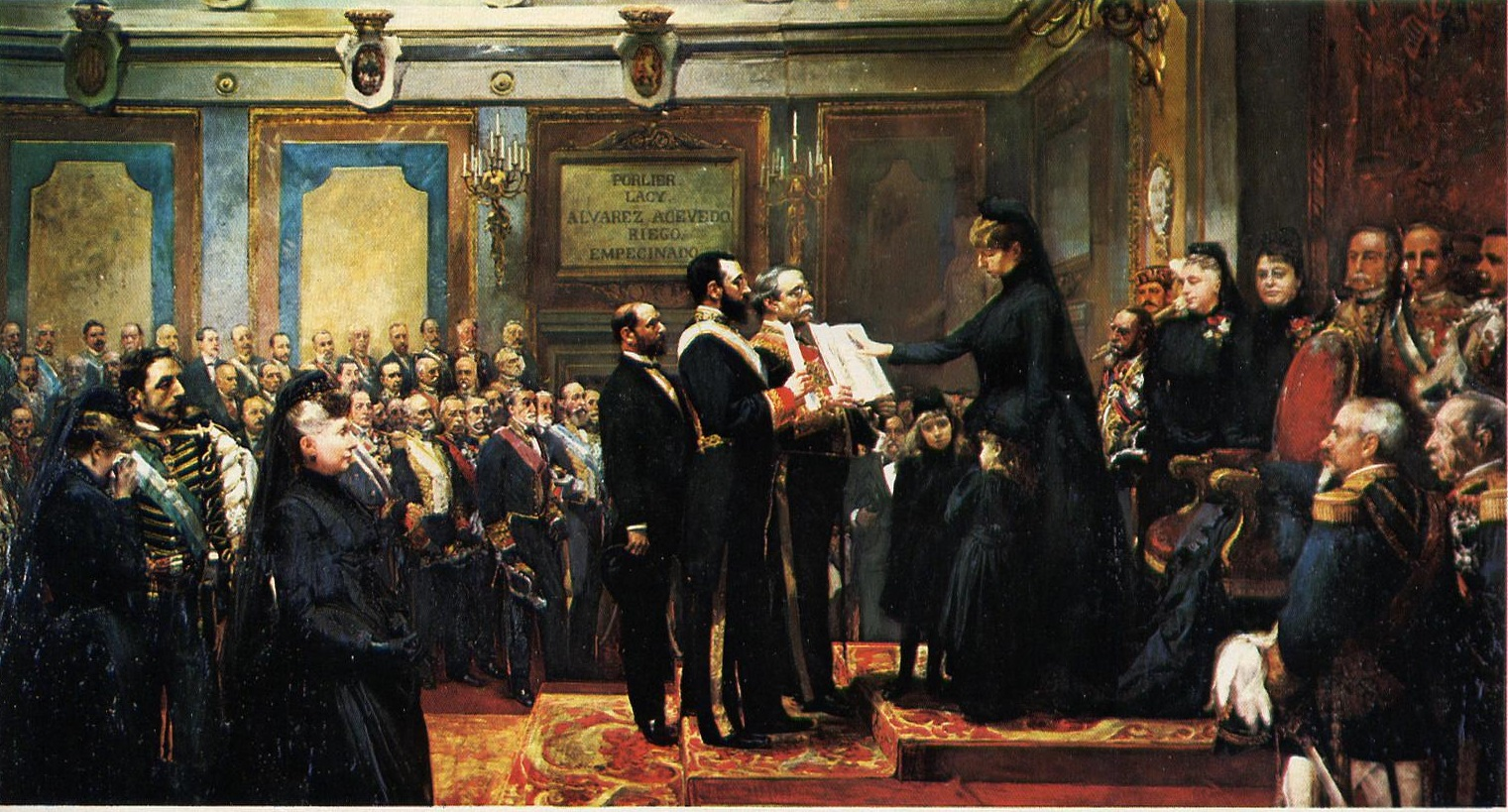
Maria Christina swears the 1876 Constitution

Designated as regent upon the death of her husband in 1885, Maria Christina swore on the 1876 Constitution on 30 December 1885 at the Palacio de las Cortes, before the two legislative bodies. She rejected the title of reina gobernadora ("Queen Governor"), distancing from the memory of the previous regent Maria Christina of Bourbon-Two Sicilies, who had used it in the 1830s.

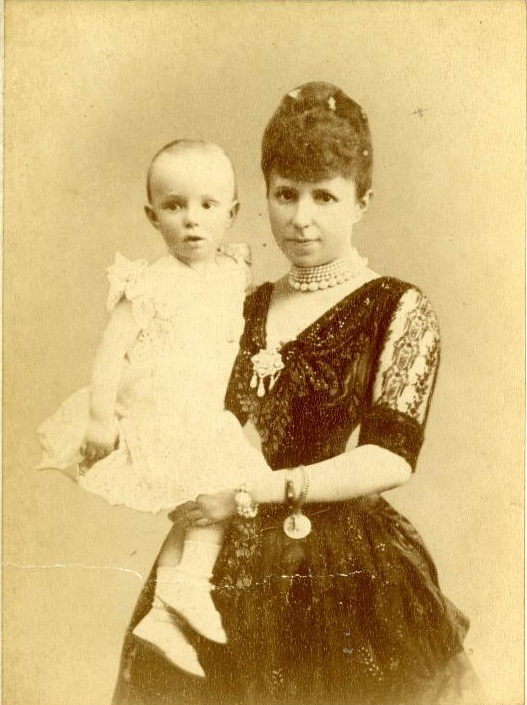
Queen Maria Christina together with her son

When the King died on 25 November 1885, Maria Christina was pregnant, so the throne was vacant, depending on whether Maria Christina's unborn child was a male or a female; a male would make that child king, while a female would place the elder daughter, the Princess of Asturias, María de las Mercedes, on the throne. During this period, Maria Christina ruled as regent until her child Alfonso, a son, was born on 17 May 1886; he was King (Alfonso XIII) from birth.

She nurtured a persona of austerity and staidness, and became known among the populace as Doña Virtudes, María la Seca ("Mary the Curt One") and la institutriz ("the governess"). She displayed strong religious beliefs which gained her the endorsement of Pope Leo XIII, weakening the adherence to Carlist stances within the clergy.

Her chief adviser and head of government was Práxedes Mateo Sagasta. Her rule is described as well-balanced and in accordance with respect for constitutional rights, and many political reforms were instated during her regency to prevent political conflicts and chaos. Her role was mostly ceremonial, and her purpose was to preserve the crown for her son until he became an adult.

Her time as regent saw the loss of Cuba, Puerto Rico, and the Philippines after the 1898 Spanish–American War.

== Later life ==
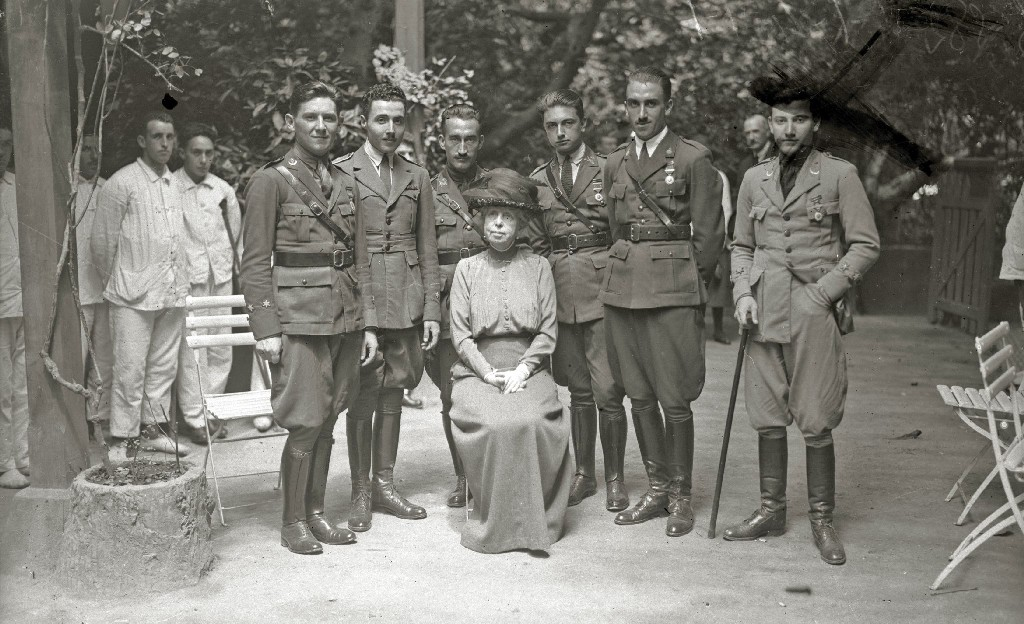
Maria Christina in 1922, during a visit to a group of soldiers wounded during the Rif War.

After the marriage of her son with Victoria Eugenie of Battenberg in 1906, she took a secondary role in public events. Nevertheless, Alfonso XIII continued to look to her on many occasions for advice.

She was the leading figure around which the Germanophile stronghold within the Royal Court coalesced during World War I, in contrast to the pro-Entente minority faction represented by her daughter-in-law, the British-born Victoria Eugenie. Spain remained a neutral country during the conflict.

She died on 6 February 1929, at the Royal Palace of Madrid, after some weeks of heart disease. She is buried at El Escorial.

Sir Charles Petrie, Alfonso XIII's biographer, maintained that the Queen dowager's death had a disastrous effect on her son, and that the latter never recovered politically from the blow. Within little more than two years the monarchy had collapsed.

Grand Duchess Maria Pavlovna of Russia described her in her 1932 memoirs as "Queen Christine, a trim vivacious little old lady with an intelligent, sharp face and white hair. Her manner was perfectly simple and cordial, but you felt, nevertheless, that she was a sovereign of the old school, who had never stepped outside the palace walls."

== Honours ==
She received the following awards:

- Austria-Hungary:
  - Grand Cross of the Order of Elizabeth, 1898
  - Dame of the Order of the Starry Cross, 1st Class
- Spain: 805th Dame of the Order of Queen Maria Luisa, 1 September 1879; Grand Mistress, 29 November 1879
- Siam: Dame of the Order of the Royal House of Chakri, 18 October 1897
- France: Grand Cross of the Legion of Honour, 17 November 1898
- Kingdom of Portugal:
  - Dame of the Order of Queen Saint Isabel, 14 November 1879
  - Dame Grand Cross of the Order of the Immaculate Conception of Vila Viçosa, 14 October 1886
  - Grand Cross of the Sash of the Three Orders, 8 November 1892
- Holy See: Golden Rose, 1886
- Empire of Japan: Dame Grand Cordon of the Order of the Precious Crown, 16 February 1889
- Kingdom of Bavaria:
  - Dame of the Order of Saint Elizabeth, 1st Class
  - Dame of Honour of the Order of Theresa
- Belgium: Grand Cordon of the Royal Order of Leopold, 1902
- Sovereign Military Order of Malta: Dame Grand Cross of Honour and Devotion, with Distinction for Jerusalem
- Ottoman Empire: Dame Grand Cordon of the Order of Charity
- Russian Empire: Dame Grand Cross of the Order of St. Catherine
- United Kingdom: Royal Order of Victoria and Albert, 1st Class

== Heraldry ==
Heraldry of Maria Christina of Austria

Coat of arms as Queen Consort of Spain (1879–1885)	Coat of arms as Queen Dowager of Spain (1885–1929)	Royal monogram of Queen Maria Christina of Spain

== Ancestry ==
Ancestors of Maria Christina of Austria

8. Leopold II, Holy Roman Emperor
4. Archduke Charles, Duke of Teschen
9. Infanta Maria Louisa of Spain
2. Archduke Karl Ferdinand of Austria
10. Frederick William, Prince of Nassau-Weilburg
5. Princess Henrietta of Nassau-Weilburg
11. Burgravine Louise Isabelle of Kirchberg
1. Maria Christina of Austria
12. Leopold II, Holy Roman Emperor (= 8)
6. Archduke Joseph, Palatine of Hungary
13. Infanta Maria Louisa of Spain (= 9)
3. Archduchess Elisabeth Franziska of Austria
14. Duke Louis of Württemberg
7. Duchess Maria Dorothea of Württemberg
15. Princess Henriette of Nassau-Weilburg

== Bibliography ==
=== References ===
Informational notes

Citations

=== Sources ===
- Campos y Fernández de Sevilla, Francisco-Javier (1994). María Cristina de Habsburgo y la Regencia, 1885–1902 (in Spanish). San Lorenzo de El Escorial: Estudios Superiores del Escorial, Real Colegio Universitario "María Cristina".
- Cancio R. Capote, Rita Mariea (1957). The Function of Maria Christina of Austria's Regency, 1885–1902, in Preserving the Spanish Monarchy. México: Ediciones Botas.
- Ferrer, Eusebio; Puga, Maria Teresa; Rojas, Enrique (1994). Cuando reinar es un deber: regencia de María Cristina de Austria de Habsburgo-Lorena: minoría de edad de Alfonso XIII, 1885-1902 (in Spanish). Barcelona: Ediciones Internacionales Universitarias.
- Figueroa y Torres, Conde de Romanones, Alvaro de (1934). Doña María Cristina de Habsburgo Lorena, la discreta regente de España (in Spanish). Madrid: Espasa-Calpe.
- Latimer, Elizabeth Wormeley (1907). Spain in the Nineteenth Century. Chicago: A. C. McClurg.
- Martín Alonso, Aurelio (1914). Diez y seis años de regencia, María Cristina de Hapsburgo-Lorena, 1885–1902 (in Spanish). Barcelona: L. Tasso.
- Queralt, María Pilar (2014). La pasión de la reina: María Cristina, la mujer que amo a Alfonso XII (in Spanish). Barcelona: Ciudad de Libros. ISBN 9781497645523.
- Thoma, Helga (2003). Habsburgs letzte Herrscherin: Maria Christine, Erzherzogin von Österreich, Königin-Regentin von Spanien (in German). Wien-Klosterneuburg: Edition Va Bene. ISBN 3851671406.

Maria Christina of Austria House of Habsburg-Lorraine Born: 21 July 1858 Died: 6 February 1929
Spanish royalty
Vacant Title last held by Mercedes of Orléans	Queen consort of Spain; 29 November 1879 – 25 November 1885	Vacant Title next held by Victoria Eugenie of Battenberg
