= Archduke Eugen of Austria =

Archduke of Austria and a Prince of Hungary and Bohemia

Archduke Eugen
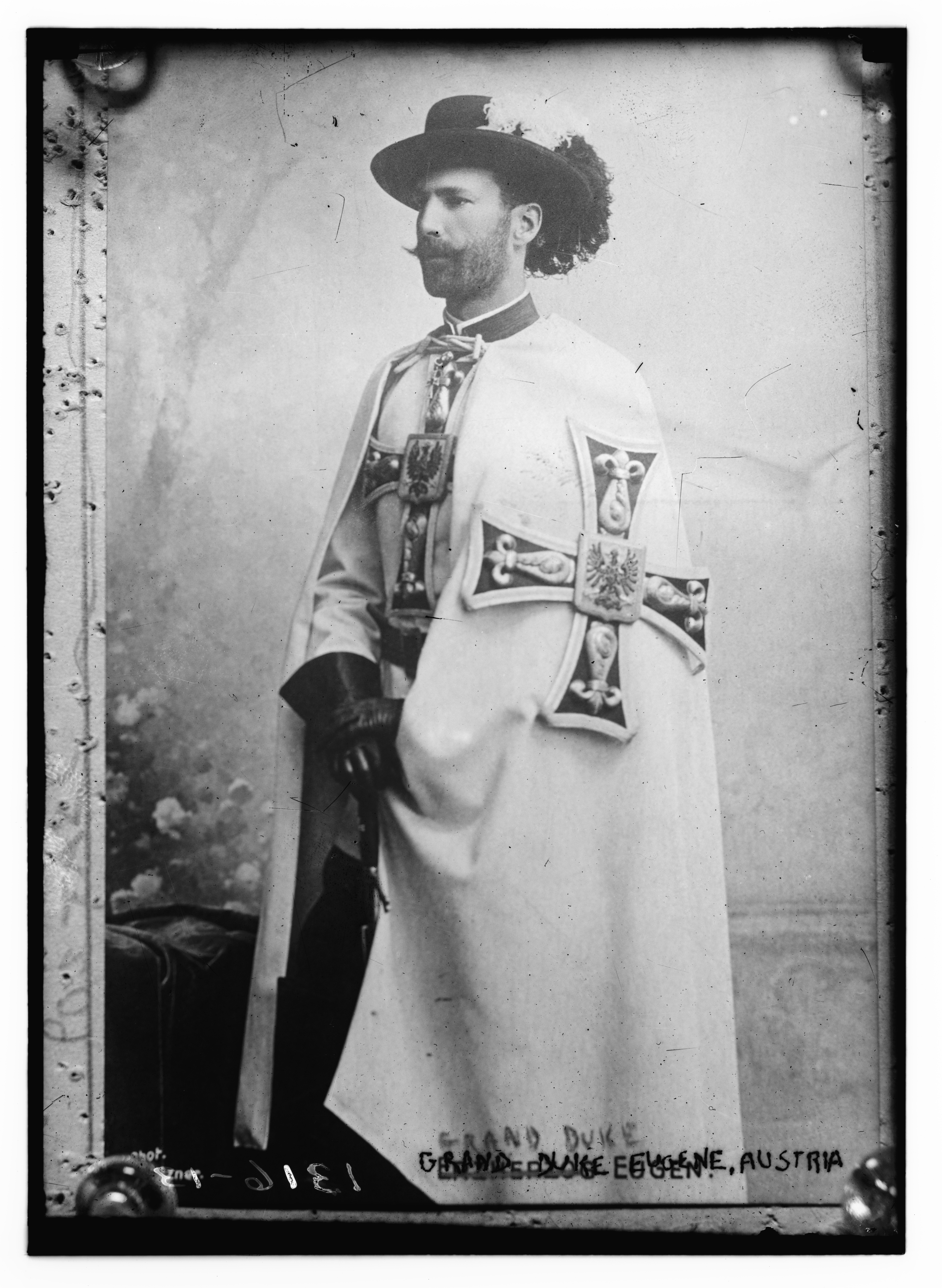
- Archduke Eugen, c. 1900s
- Born: 21 May 1863; Gross-Seelowitz, Moravia, Austrian Empire
- Died: 30 December 1954 (aged 91); Merano, Italy
- House: Habsburg-Lorraine
- Father: Archduke Karl Ferdinand of Austria
- Mother: Archduchess Elisabeth Franziska of Austria

Archduke Eugen Ferdinand Pius Bernhard Felix Maria of Austria-Teschen (21 May 1863 – 30 December 1954) was an Archduke of Austria and a Prince of Hungary and Bohemia. He was the last Grand Master of the Teutonic Order from the Habsburg dynasty.

== Early life ==
Eugen was the son of Archduke Karl Ferdinand of Austria (son of Archduke Charles, Duke of Teschen) and of his wife Archduchess Elisabeth Franziska of Austria. He was born at the castle of Gross Seelowitz in Moravia (today Židlochovice near Brno in the Czech Republic). At his baptism he was given the names Eugen Ferdinand Pius Bernhard Felix Maria. His education was Spartan in character. His country living at Gross Seelowitz and holidays at Gmund alternated with a sound education and strict instruction.

At the Palais Erzherzog Albrecht (Archduke Albrecht's Palace, also known as the Albrechtspalais) in Vienna, Eugen received instruction in all the military subjects in addition to languages, music and the history of art. At the age of 14 in keeping with the family tradition and like his elder brother Friedrich, he also began his military career with the Tyrolean Kaiserjäger Regiment and was commissioned as a Leutnant on 27 October 1877. Shortly thereafter he was transferred as an Oberleutnant to a hussar regiment and in the following years participated in many lengthy manoeuvres.

In 1882, Eugen took an examination before a commission assembled by Archduke Albrecht that verified his suitability to attend the military academy at Wiener Neustadt. Eugen became then the sole archduke to attend the several year long course at the academy (1883–1885) and subsequently successfully graduated as a fully trained general staff officer.

== Military career ==
In 1885, Eugen was assigned to the Austro-Hungarian General Staff and rapidly rose through the ranks. He commanded a battalion of Infantry Regiment 13 as a lieutenant colonel before assuming command of the entire regiment as a colonel. Following a further regimental assignment as commanding officer of Hussar regiment 13, he assumed command of an infantry brigade in Olomouc and then a division in Vienna. In 1900 he was appointed to the command of XIV Army Corps in Innsbruck and promoted to General der Kavallerie on 27 April 1901. This command simultaneously also made him the commanding general in Innsbruck and the defence commander for Tyrol. He was appointed eight years later as an army inspector and senior defence commander for Tyrol. When in 1909 the possibility of a war against Serbia was in the air he alongside Archduke Franz Ferdinand and General Albori was named as a presumptive army commander.

Eugen also had exercised his influence in the field of personnel. He had urgently recommended Feldmarschallleutnant Franz Conrad von Hötzendorf, his divisional commander at Innsbruck as the successor to the retiring chief of the general staff — General Friedrich von Beck-Rzikowsky. In 1911, the Archduke retired from active military service ostensibly for health reasons. Hötzendorf however suggested in his memoirs that Archduke Franz Ferdinand had become increasingly jealous of the importance of Eugen.

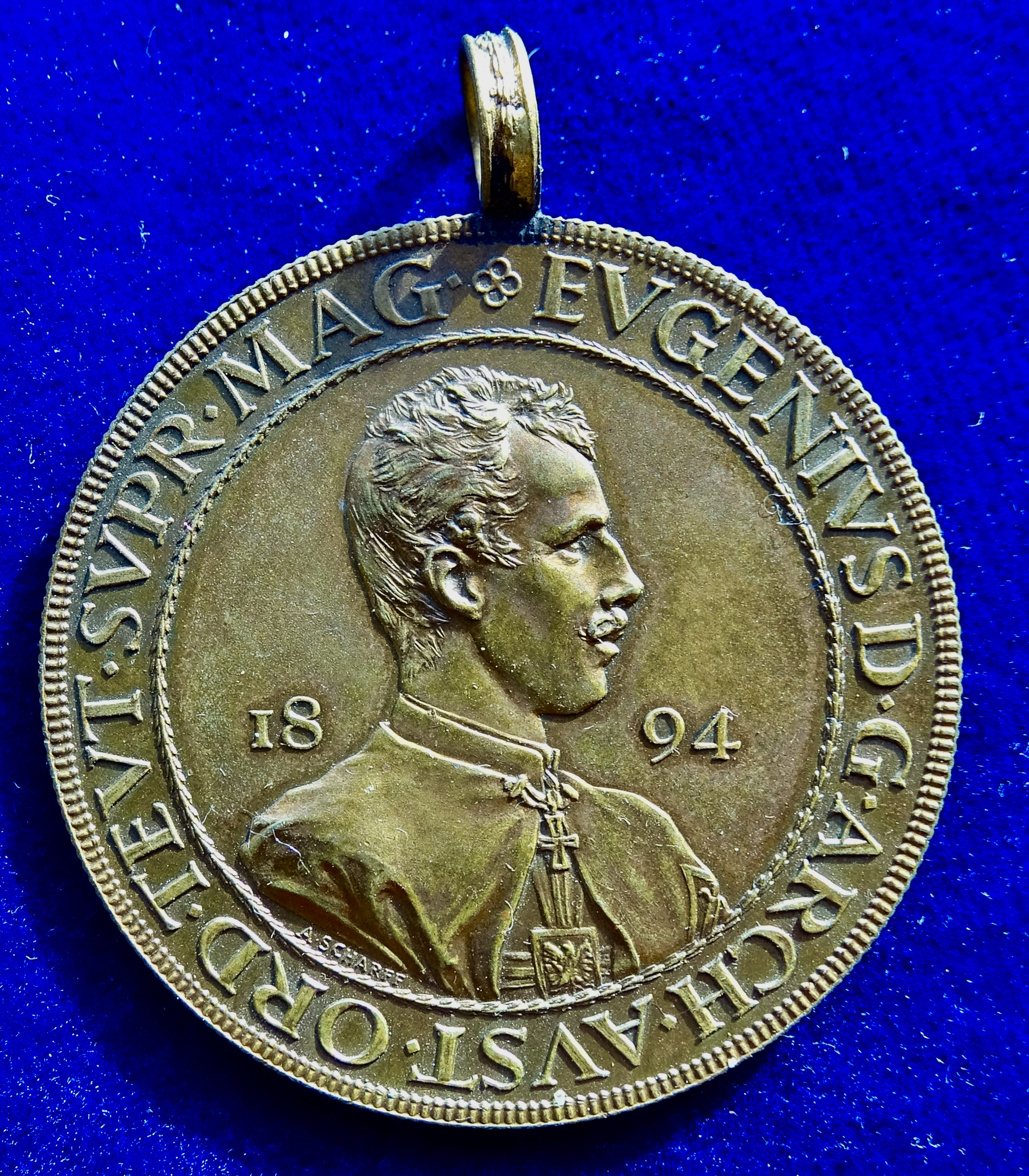
Archduke Eugen of Austria 1894 Grand Master of the Teutonic Order Inauguration Medal by Scharff, obverse

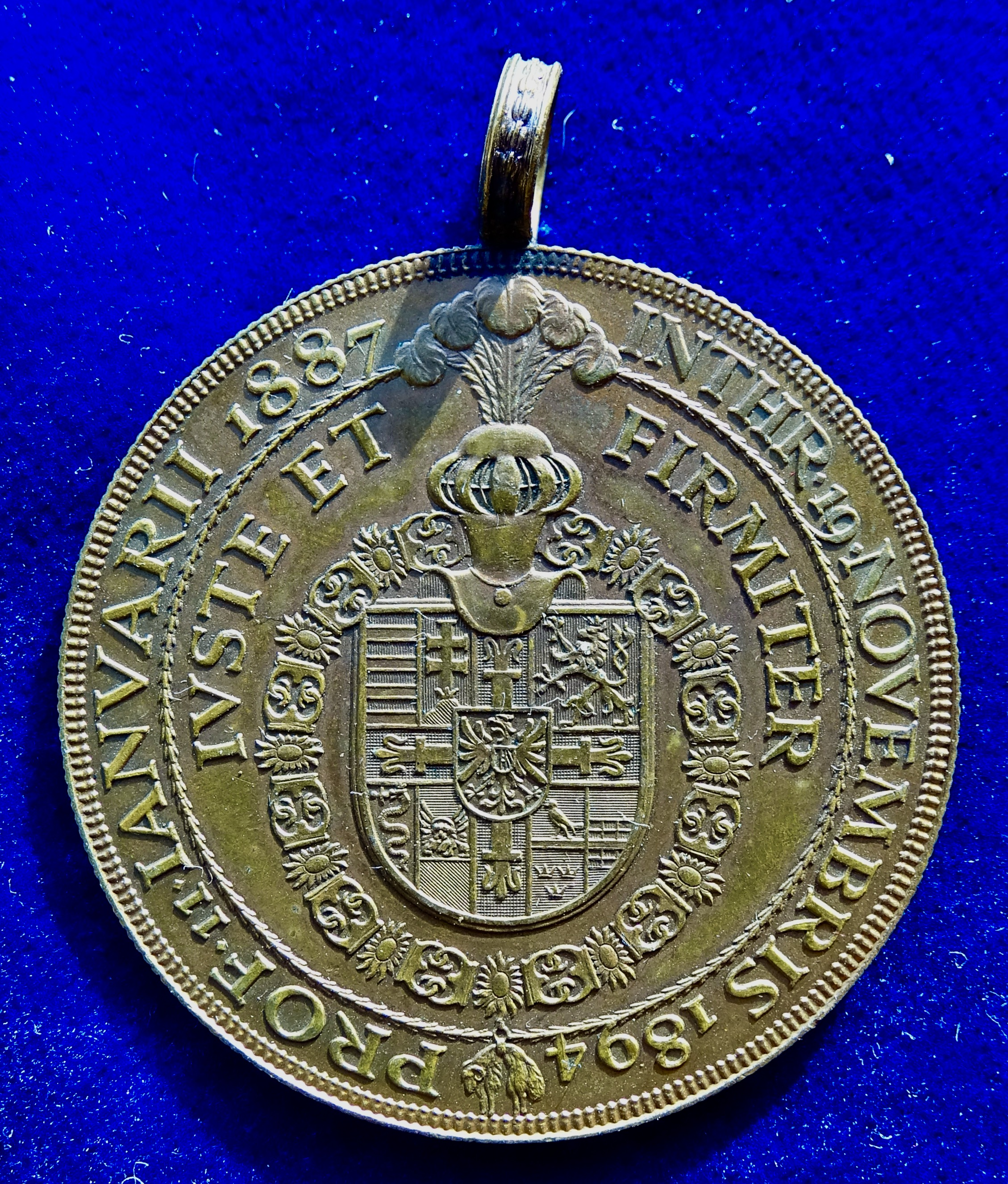
The coat of arms of Archduke Eugen on the reverse of this medal

In addition to his military career above all else, Eugen was called upon to perform his duty as the Grand Master of the Teutonic Order. On 11 January 1887, Eugen entered the Teutonic Order as a professed knight. At the same time he was chosen to be the coadjutor of his uncle, Archduke Wilhelm, then Hoch- und Deutschmeister.

When Archduke Wilhelm suddenly died, Eugen was enthroned as the new Hoch- und Deutschmeister on 19 November 1894 and in this office he also proved himself very effective. He further developed the institution of the volunteer nursing care (Marianer), founded new hospitals and improved the training of the sisters. Finally he had the central archives of the order in Vienna sorted out and extended.

== World War I ==
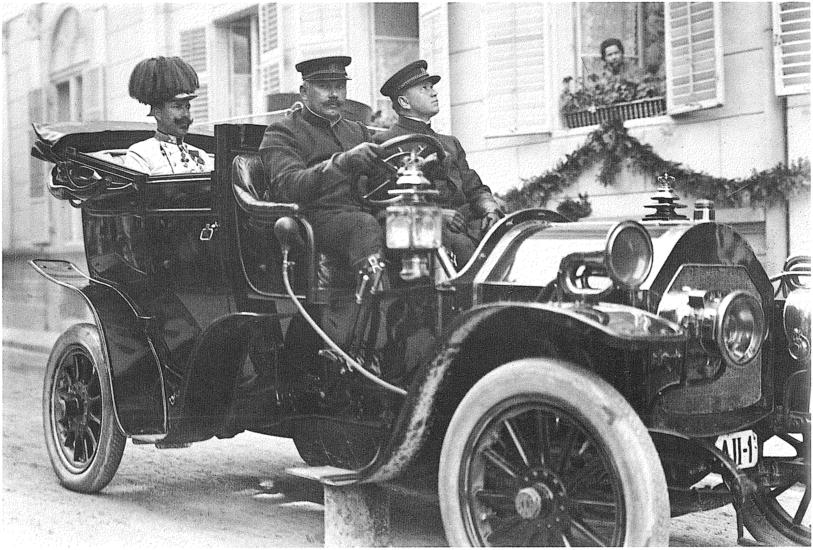
Archduke Eugen at Ischl

At the outbreak of World War I Eugen immediately reported for active duty. At first he was palmed off with a relatively unimportant post as the patron of the voluntary war welfare organization. Finally he was transferred in December 1914 to replace Oskar Potiorek and assume the post of commander of the forces in the Balkans (Balkanstreitkräfte) with his headquarters at Petrovaradin. Together with his chief of staff, Feldmarschall-Leutnant Alfred Krauss, a very talented military theoretician with a decisive and vigorous character, he reorganized the hard hit 5th Army.

On 22 May 1915, Eugen was promoted to Generaloberst. Two days later on 24 May he was entrusted with the command of the southwestern front against Italy. He moved his headquarters to Marburg (Maribor) and now commanded a theatre stretching from the Swiss border to the Adriatic. His main objective here was straightforward defence against the many times numerically superior Italian forces. Only at the beginning was the designation "Southwest Front Command" clear. From March 1916, it functioned as Heeresgruppen-Kommando Erzherzog Eugen in Tyrol to the exclusion of the remaining parts of the front and at the beginning of the execution of the 12th battle of the Isonzo as Heeresfront Erzherzog Eugen with the allied German 14th Army and Heeresgruppe von Boroević under command but Heeresgruppe von Conrad was not immediately subordinate.

Coat of arms of Archduke Eugen

During the First Battle of the Isonzo Eugen traveled back and forth behind the front. He attended many conferences, appeared on the front lines and encouraged the troops and in this way achieved great popularity. At the same time he managed the rear areas in order to guarantee the best possible supply to the forward troops.

Before the great attack from the South Tyrol which took place in the spring of 1916, Eugen assumed command as army group commander of the 11th and 3rd armies and took up headquarters at the estate of his cousin, the Graf von Bozen und Maurer, just outside Bozen (Bolzano). After initial success, the attack had to be broken off in consequence of the danger posed to the Russian front following the Brusilov offensive of June 1916 and the subsequent transfer of formations to that threatened front. However, after breaking off the offensive, Archduke Eugen successfully withdrew his troops in the second half of June 1916 into secure positions.

As the war progressed, Eugen had to transfer more and more of his troops to the hard fighting Isonzo Army so that he soon had to manage without reserves in his own theatre of operations. Although he had only a very limited forces holding the Tyrolean front, he never considered withdrawing further and shortening his line. He was too personally attached to the land to do that.

Eugen was promoted to Field Marshal on 23 November 1916 and in the middle of March 1917 again took up his work as the commander of the southwest front. During the Caporetto offensive, Eugen was the actual commander employing his complete energy in the process. He recognized that this was the last favorable opportunity for the Central Powers. The Archduke, not typically a harsh taskmaster to his soldiers, could on this occasion not push hard enough. There appeared temporarily to be great confusion in the issuing of orders. It is possible that many blamed Eugen and his staff for this.

Against the will of the chief of the general staff, Generaloberst Baron Arz von Straußenburg, the Emperor Karl released Eugen from active service on 18 December 1917. The southwestern front command was terminated. The relief of Eugen does not appear to have been made for personal but on objective reasons. After Russia's withdrawal from the war and the shortening of various other fronts (Isonzo, Carinthia, Dolomites), the senior generals pushed at the Piave. With his very senior rank, Eugen could only be a commander in chief. Eugen was forced to go as the Emperor Karl himself took up the supreme command.

Eugen still enjoyed high renown and at the end of the war at the beginning of November 1918, the idea of Eugen becoming a regent was introduced. The last foreign minister Graf Andrássy and the member of parliament Dr. Franz Dinghofer of the German nationalist party had discussed this. However, Eugen would never have accepted such an offer without the consent of the emperor.

=== Military awards ===
Amongst the Archduke's considerable number of Austro-Hungarian awards here are the most important:

- Knight of the Order of the Golden Fleece (13 April 1878)
- Throat and Breast Cross of a Professed Knight of the Teutonic Order (11 January 1886)
- Grand Master of the Teutonic Order (30 July 1894)
- Military Merit Cross (30 November 1898)
- Jubilee Commemoration Medal (2 December 1898)
- Military Service Award III Class (24 October 1902)
- Bronze Military Merit Medal (26 September 1905)
- Brilliants to the Military Merit Cross (12 August 1908)
- Second Expression of Appreciation (Silver Military Merit Medal 1911) (11 October 1908)
- Military Jubilee Cross (2 December 1908)
- Grand Cross of the Royal Hungarian Order of St. Stephen (30 March 1911)
- Red Cross Merit Star with War Decoration (8 March 1915)
- Bronze Military Merit Medal (War ribbon) (9 May 1915)
- Military Merit Cross 1st Class with War Decoration (29 July 1915)
- Large Military Merit Medal (24 May 1916)
- Grand Cross of the Military Order of Maria Theresa (15 January 1917)
- Silver Military Merit Medal with Swords (26 June 1917)
- Brilliants to the Military Merit Cross 1st Class with War Decoration and Swords (5 November 1917)

He also received the Swords to both his Large Military Merit Medal and Bronze Military Merit Medal at a later date to the original awards.

Additionally he was the possessor of a host of foreign awards and decorations:

- Grand Cross of the Romanian Order of the Star (3 October 1881)
- Grand Cross of the Royal Spanish Order of Charles III (25 June 1883)
- Grand Cross of the Royal Portuguese Order of the Tower and Sword (7 March 1890)
- Knight of the Royal Prussian Order of the Black Eagle (30 January 1891)
- Grand Cross of the Grand Ducal Hessian Order of Ludwig (5 May 1892)
- Grand Cross of the Grand Ducal Tuscan Order of St. Joseph (7 April 1896)
- Knight of the Imperial Russian Order of St. Andrew with Chain (26 June 1896)
- Knight of the Imperial Russian Order of St. Alexander Nevsky
- Knight of the Imperial Russian Order of the White Eagle
- Knight 1st Class of the Imperial Russian Order of St. Anna
- Knight of the Siamese Order of the Royal House of Chakri (23 June 1897)
- Knight of the Royal Swedish Order of the Seraphim (18 September 1897)
- Royal Swedish Jubilee Commemorative Medal
- Knight of the Papal Supreme Order of Christ (17 February 1904)
- Grand Cross of the Ducal Saxe-Ernestine House Order (5 June 1904)
- Collar of the Royal Spanish Order of Charles III (18 May 1907)
- Grand Cross of the Papal Order of the Holy Sepulchre (24 September 1907)
- Honorary Grand Cross of the Royal Victorian Order (21 August 1908)
- Commemoration Medal to the Regency of Queen Maria Christina of Spain (1909)
- Grand Cordon of the Royal Belgian Order of Leopold (6 October 1910)
- Royal Prussian Iron Cross 1st and 2nd Classes (30 March 1915)
- Grand Commander of the Royal Prussian House Order of Hohenzollern with Swords (4 August 1915)
- Grand Cross of the Royal Bavarian Military Order of Max Joseph (16 November 1915)
- Imperial Ottoman Gold and Silver Imtiyaz Medals (15 January 1916)
- Friedrich-August Cross, 1st and 2nd Classes of the Grand Duchy of Oldenburg (15 March 1916)
- Royal Prussian Order Pour le Mérite (23 May 1916)
- Grand Cross of the House Order of Vigilance or of the White Falcon with Swords of the Grand Duchy of Saxe-Weimer (2 December 1916)
- Honour Award of the Royal Bulgarian Red Cross (1916/1917)
- Oak leaves to the Royal Prussian Order Pour le Mérite (3 November 1917)
- Royal Bulgarian Order of Bravery 1st Class (20 November 1917)
- Grand Cross of the Royal Württemberg Military Merit Order (2 January 1918)
- Royal Bavarian Honour Award to commemorate the Golden Anniversary of King Ludwig III (20 January 1918)

== Later life ==
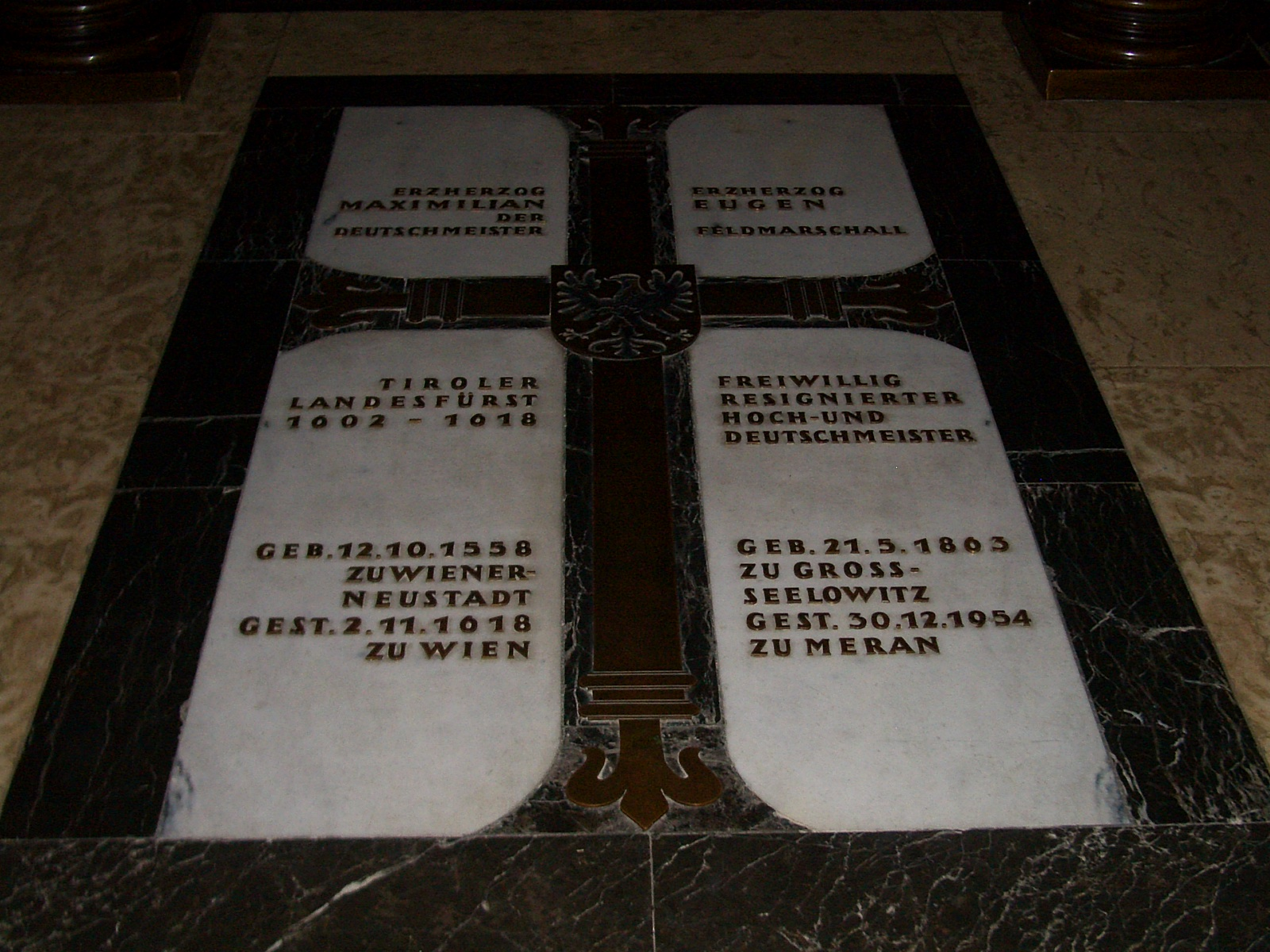
Tombs of Maximilian III, Archduke of Austria (1558–1618) and Archduke Eugen of Austria (1863–1954) in St Jacob's Cathedral, Innsbruck

Following the collapse of the monarchy Eugen first settled in Lucerne and then at Basel where he lived modestly in a hotel from 1918 to 1934. In order to safeguard the existence of the Teutonic Order, Eugen voluntarily resigned his position as the Hoch- und Deutschmeister in 1923. He had been the last hereditary grand master of the order. In this way the possessions of the order were saved.

In 1934, Eugen settled at the order's convent at Gumpoldskirchen near Vienna. He participated at monarchical rallies, attended veterans' meetings and placed himself again at the service of the dynasty even though he himself no longer believed that he would live to see the restoration. Following the Anschluss of Austria to Germany in 1938 the Teutonic Order was dissolved and its possessions confiscated.

Eugen was provided with a rented house in Hietzing, probably with the help of Hermann Göring and other senior military figures, where he lived during the Second World War. In 1945, he fled to Tyrol, where the French occupation authorities provided him with a small rented villa in Igls, a district of Innsbruck. On 21 May 1953, the city of Innsbruck celebrated the field marshal's 90th birthday.

Eugen died on 30 December 1954 at Meran, by then part of Italy, the oldest living member of the dynasty at the time and later the 2nd oldest ever Archduke of Austria, surrounded by the brothers of his order from Lana. On 6 January 1955, he was buried in the St. Jakobskirche at Innsbruck next to Archduke Maximilian III (1558–1618).

== Ancestry ==
Ancestors of Archduke Eugen of Austria

8. Leopold II, Holy Roman Emperor
4. Archduke Charles, Duke of Teschen
9. Infanta María Luisa of Spain
2. Archduke Karl Ferdinand of Austria
10. Frederick William, Prince of Nassau-Weilburg
5. Princess Henrietta of Nassau-Weilburg
11. Burgravine Louise Isabelle of Kirchberg
1. Archduke Eugen of Austria
12. Leopold II, Holy Roman Emperor (= 8)
6. Archduke Joseph, Palatine of Hungary
13. Infanta María Luisa of Spain (= 9)
3. Archduchess Elisabeth Franziska of Austria
14. Duke Louis of Württemberg
7. Duchess Maria Dorothea of Württemberg
15. Princess Henriette of Nassau-Weilburg

== Bibliography ==
- Rác, Robert. Arcivévoda Evzen Habsbursko-lotrinský 1863-1954: velmistr Rádu nemeckých rytíru. Sovinec/Eulenburg: Esmedia, 2005.
- Schildenfeld, Zoë von. Erzherzog Eugen, 1863-1963: ein Gedenkbuch. Innsbruck: F. Rauch, 1963.
- Chisholm, Hugh, ed. (1922). "Eugene, Archduke" . Encyclopædia Britannica (12th ed.). London & New York: The Encyclopædia Britannica Company.

Archduke Eugen of Austria Teutonic Order Born: 21 May 1863 Died: 30 December 1954
Religious titles
Preceded by Archduke Wilhelm; Franz of Austria	Hochmeister; 1894–1923	Succeeded by Norbert Klein
