= Archduchess Maria Karoline of Austria =

Austrian Archduchess (1825–1915)

Maria Carolina of Austria
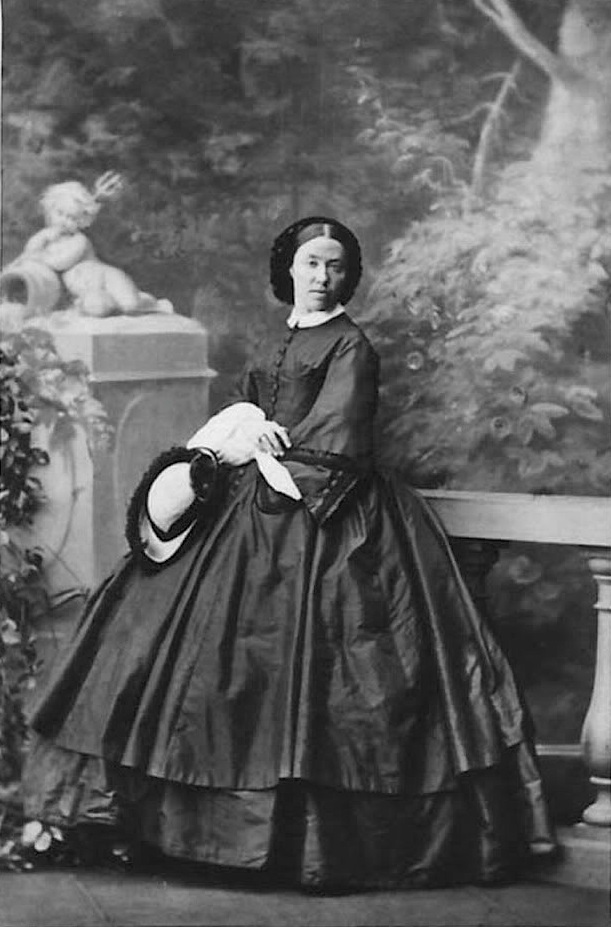
- Born: 10 September 1825; Vienna, Austrian Empire
- Died: 17 July 1915 (aged 89); Baden bei Wien, Austria-Hungary
- Burial: Imperial Crypt, Vienna
- Spouse: Archduke Rainer Ferdinand of Austria (m. 1852; died 1913)
Names
- Maria Karoline Luise Christine
- House: Habsburg-Lorraine
- Father: Archduke Charles, Duke of Teschen
- Mother: Princess Henrietta of Nassau-Weilburg

Archduchess Maria Karoline of Austria (Maria Karoline Luise Christine, Erzherzogin von Österreich; 10 September 1825 – 17 July 1915) was an Archduchess of Austria.

== Life ==
Archduchess Maria Karoline was born in Vienna as the second daughter and sixth child of Archduke Charles, Duke of Teschen and Princess Henrietta of Nassau-Weilburg. Her father, who was known for his victory at the 1809 Battle of Aspern-Essling, the first time Napoleon was personally defeated in a major battle, was a son of Leopold II, Holy Roman Emperor and Infanta Maria Luisa of Spain. Her mother was a daughter of Frederick William of Nassau-Weilburg and his wife Burgravine Louise Isabelle of Kirchberg. Between her siblings there were Maria Theresa, Queen consort of Two Sicilies and Archduke Albrecht, Duke of Teschen.

She was Princess-Abbess of the Theresian Royal and Imperial Ladies Chapter of the Castle of Prague.

On 21 February 1852, Maria Karoline married her cousin Archduke Rainer Ferdinand of Austria, third son of Archduke Rainer of Austria and Princess Elisabeth of Savoy-Carignano. The marriage was a very happy one, and the couple was probably the most popular amongst the Habsburg family. The marriage remained childless.

At the time of her death, she was the last surviving grandchild of Leopold II, Holy Roman Emperor, and the last surviving great-grandchild of Maria Theresa of Austria.

== Ancestry ==
Ancestors of Archduchess Maria Karoline of Austria

8. Francis I, Holy Roman Emperor
4. Leopold II, Holy Roman Emperor
9. Maria Theresa, Queen of Hungary
2. Archduke Charles, Duke of Teschen
10. Charles III of Spain
5. Infanta Maria Luisa of Spain
11. Princess Maria Amalia of Saxony
1. Archduchess Maria Karoline of Austria
12. Charles Christian, Prince of Nassau-Weilburg
6. Frederick William, Prince of Nassau-Weilburg
13. Princess Carolina of Orange-Nassau
3. Princess Henrietta of Nassau-Weilburg
14. Wilhelm Georg, Burgrave of Kirchberg
7. Burgravine Louise Isabella of Kirchberg
15. Princess Isabelle Auguste Reuss of Greiz
