= Archduke Karl Ferdinand of Austria =

Archduke of Austria (1818–1874)

Archduke Karl Ferdinand
- Born: 29 July 1818; Vienna, Austrian Empire
- Died: 20 November 1874 (aged 56); Židlochovice Palace, Židlochovice, Moravia, Austrian Empire
- Burial: Imperial Crypt
- Spouse: Archduchess Elisabeth Franziska of Austria (m. 1854)
- Issue: Archduke Franz Joseph; Archduke Friedrich, Duke of Teschen; Maria Christina, Queen of Spain; Archduke Charles Stephen; Archduke Eugen; Archduchess Maria Eleonora
- House: Habsburg-Lorraine
- Father: Archduke Charles, Duke of Teschen
- Mother: Princess Henrietta of Nassau-Weilburg
- Religion: Roman Catholicism

Archduke Karl Ferdinand of Austria (Vienna, 29 July 1818 – Gross Seelowitz (Židlochovice Castle), 20 November 1874) was the second son of Archduke Charles, Duke of Teschen (1771–1847) and Princess Henrietta of Nassau-Weilburg, and the maternal grandfather of King Alfonso XIII of Spain.

A son of the "hero of Aspern", he started his military career in Infantry Regiment 57 in Brno. Later, he received command of a brigade in Italy and fought against the insurgents in Prague in 1848.

In 1859, he was a general in Moravia and Silesia and returned to Brno in 1860. He became a lieutenant field marshal of the Austrian Army. He was also awarded as a Knight of the Order of the Golden Fleece.

== Marriage and children ==
Monarchical styles of Archduke Karl Ferdinand of Austria
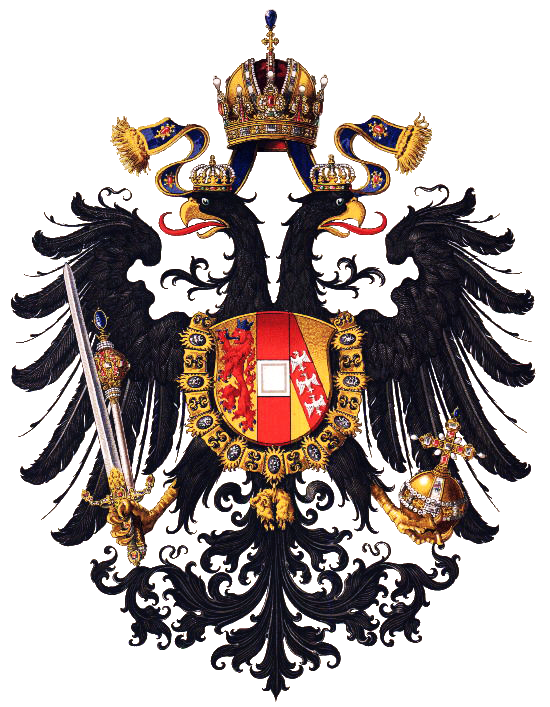
- Reference style: His Imperial and Royal Highness
- Spoken style: Your Imperial and Royal Highness

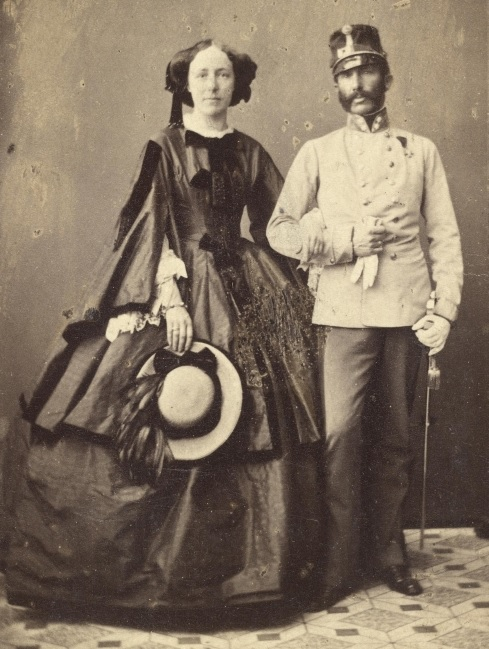
Karl Ferdinand and his wife Elisabeth Franziska, 1860s

In Vienna, on 18 April 1854, Karl Ferdinand married his first cousin, Archduchess Elisabeth of Austria, the widow of Archduke Ferdinand of Austria-Este, the daughter of Archduke Joseph of Austria, Palatine of Hungary and the mother of Queen Maria Theresia of Bavaria.

They had six children:

1. Archduke Franz Joseph of Austria (1855)
2. Archduke Friedrich of Austria, Duke of Teschen (1856–1936), Supreme Commander of the Austro-Hungarian Army during World War I.
3. Archduchess Maria Christina of Austria (1858–1929), married King Alfonso XII of Spain
4. Archduke Charles Stephen of Austria (1860–1933), Admiral
5. Archduke Eugen of Austria (1863–1954), Fieldmarshal and Grand Master of the Teutonic Order
6. Archduchess Maria Eleonora of Austria (1864)

== Ancestry ==
Ancestors of Archduke Karl Ferdinand of Austria

8. Francis I, Holy Roman Emperor
4. Leopold II, Holy Roman Emperor
9. Maria Theresa, Queen of Hungary
2. Archduke Charles, Duke of Teschen
10. Charles III of Spain
5. Infanta Maria Luisa of Spain
11. Princess Maria Amalia of Saxony
1. Archduke Karl Ferdinand of Austria
12. Charles Christian, Prince of Nassau-Weilburg
6. Frederick William, Prince of Nassau-Weilburg
13. Princess Carolina of Orange-Nassau
3. Princess Henrietta of Nassau-Weilburg
14. Wilhelm Georg, Burgrave of Kirchberg
7. Burgravine Louise Isabella of Kirchberg
15. Princess Isabelle Auguste Reuss of Greiz
