= Archduke Wilhelm Franz of Austria =

Archduke of Austria (1827–1894)

Archduke Wilhelm Franz
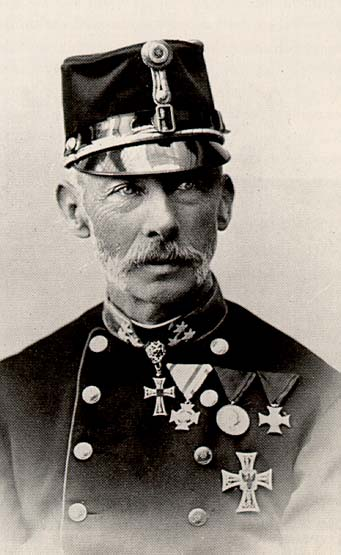
- Wilhelm Franz c. 1885–94
- Born: 21 April 1827; Vienna, Austrian Empire
- Died: 29 April 1894 (aged 67); Weikersdorf, Austria-Hungary
- House: Habsburg-Lorraine
- Father: Archduke Charles, Duke of Teschen
- Mother: Princess Henrietta of Nassau-Weilburg

Archduke Wilhelm Franz Karl of Austria-Teschen (German: Erzherzog Wilhelm Franz Karl von Habsburg-Lothringen, 21 April 1827 – 29 April 1894) was an Archduke of Austria from the House of Habsburg.

== Life ==
He was born in Vienna as the son of Archduke Charles, Duke of Teschen and Princess Henrietta of Nassau-Weilburg. He was a grandson of Leopold II and nephew of Franz II, the last two Holy Roman Emperors.

He studied political sciences at the University of Vienna and he was a student of Joseph von Kudler.

He held the office of Grand Master of the Teutonic Knights from 1863 until his death in 1894. He gained the rank of feldzeugmeister in the service of the Austrian Army in January 1867, after commanding the artillery and being wounded at the Battle of Königgrätz (1866). He was governor of the federal Fortress of Mainz.

Archduke Wilhelm of Austria, as a professed Catholic Religious Brother, died unmarried and without issue on 29 July 1894 in Weikersdorf after falling from a horse. His horse was startled by an electric tram while riding in Baden. He died without regaining consciousness. His death was attributed to a concussion on the brain. The archduke was 67 years old.

== Ancestry ==
Coat of Arms of Archduke Wilhelm Franz of Austria

Ancestors of Archduke Wilhelm Franz of Austria

8. Francis I, Holy Roman Emperor
4. Leopold II, Holy Roman Emperor
9. Maria Theresa, Queen of Hungary
2. Archduke Charles, Duke of Teschen
10. Charles III of Spain
5. Infanta Maria Luisa of Spain
11. Princess Maria Amalia of Saxony
1. Archduke Wilhelm Franz of Austria
12. Charles Christian, Prince of Nassau-Weilburg
6. Frederick William, Prince of Nassau-Weilburg
13. Princess Carolina of Orange-Nassau
3. Princess Henrietta of Nassau-Weilburg
14. Wilhelm Georg, Burgrave of Kirchberg
7. Burgravine Louise Isabella of Kirchberg
15. Princess Isabelle Auguste Reuss of Greiz

Grand Master of the Teutonic Order
Preceded by Archduke Maximilian of Austria-Este	Hochmeister; 1863–1894	Succeeded by Archduke Eugen of Austria
