= Archduke Friedrich of Austria (1821–1847) =

Austrian Archduke and admiral (1821–1847)

Archduke Friedrich
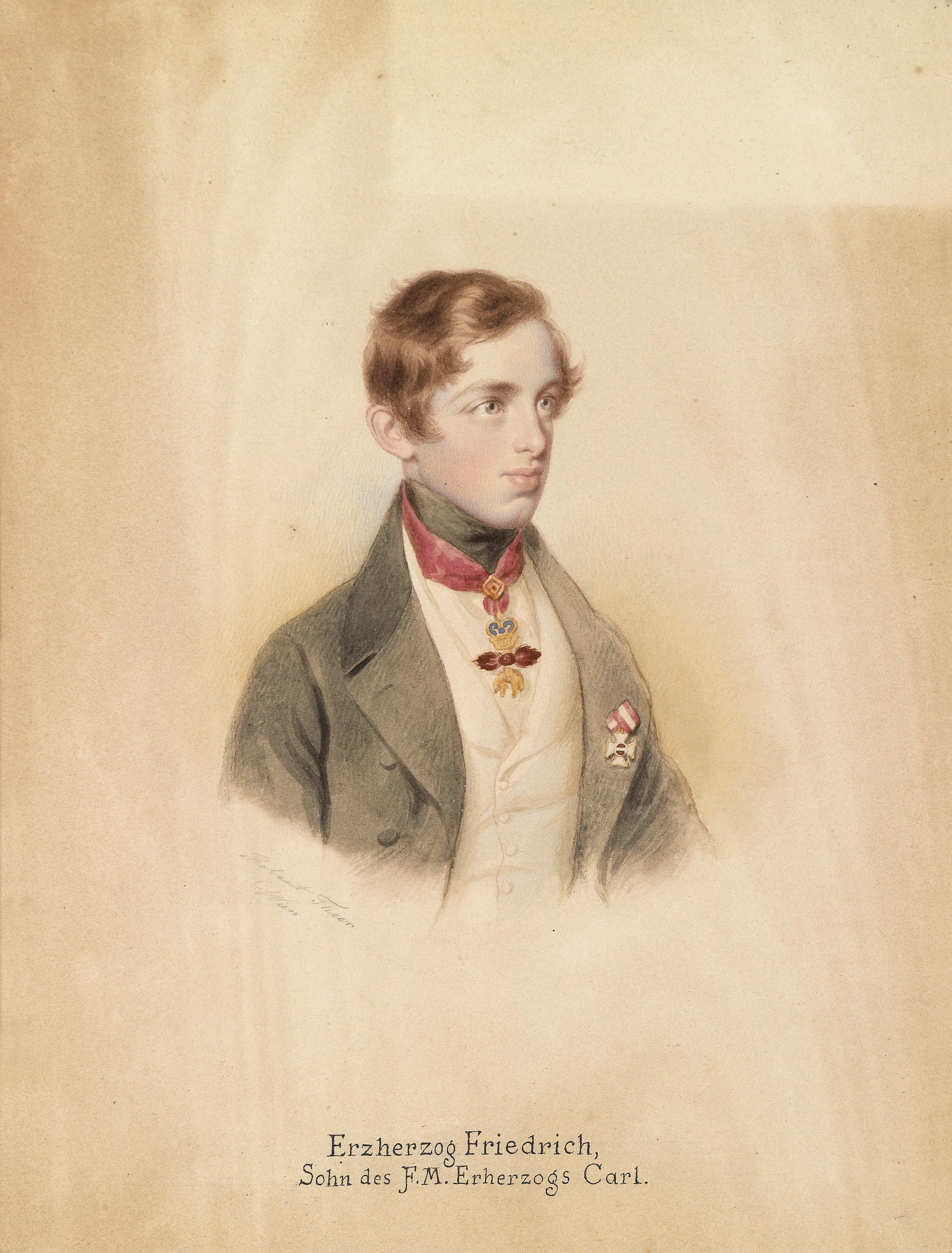
- Archduke Friedrich, by Robert Theer
- Born: 14 May 1821; Vienna, Austrian Empire
- Died: 5 October 1847 (aged 26); Venice, Kingdom of Lombardy–Venetia, Austrian Empire
Names
- Friedrich Ferdinand Leopold
- House: Habsburg-Lorraine
- Father: Archduke Charles, Duke of Teschen
- Mother: Princess Henrietta of Nassau-Weilburg

Archduke Friedrich Ferdinand Leopold of Austria (German: Erzherzog Friedrich Ferdinand Leopold von Österreich) (14 May 1821 – 5 October 1847) was a member of the House of Habsburg and Commander-in-Chief of the Austrian Navy.

== Family ==
Friedrich was the third son of Field Marshal Archduke Charles of Austria (1771–1847) and Princess Henrietta of Nassau-Weilburg (1797–1829). He never married and did not leave issue.

== Military career in the Navy ==
Born in Vienna, Friedrich joined the Imperial Austrian Navy in 1837 at the age of sixteen. He threw himself into this career with much zeal and quickly rose to command a ship, sailing to the Orient for the first time in 1839.

=== Oriental Crisis of 1840 ===
During the Oriental Crisis of 1840 between Egypt and the Ottoman Empire, Friedrich fought in the campaign against Muhammad Ali after the Convention of London. He served with the Austrian fleet off the Levantine coast as commander of the ship Guerriera.

In that convention, the United Kingdom, Austria, Prussia, and Russia had offered Muhammad Ali hereditary rule of Egypt as part of the Ottoman Empire if he withdrew from the Syrian hinterland and the coast of Mount Lebanon. Muhammad Ali hesitated until British naval forces moved against Syria and Alexandria. After the British and Austrian navies blockaded the Nile Delta coastline, shelled Beirut (on 11 September 1840), and after Acre had surrendered (on 3 November 1840), Muhammad Ali agreed to the terms of the convention on 27 November 1840.

From his ship Friedrich directed the assault on the citadels of Sidon and Beirut which soon fell. On 24 September Admiral Stopford decided to occupy Saida and the Austrian ship "Guerriera", on which the Archduke Friedrich was, was added to this expedition. At 11 a.m. on 26 September the firing on Saïda began. Immediately the attack was continued on land, the troops were disembarked and led to the storm. It was then that the Archduke led the troops ahead of all others against the Bergcastell and by 6 o'clock in the afternoon was master of the square. 1,500 men of the crew were taken prisoner.

With taking Saida, the most important citadel, Acre, had to be taken yet. On 3 November 1840 shelling began without interruption. At half past four, a powder depot in the fortress blew up and caused much damage. Following the bombardment of Acre on 3–4 November 1840, he decided to attack the citadel that night and personally led a small landing party of Austrian, British and Ottoman Turkish troops and took the citadel of Acre after the Egyptian garrison had fled. They hoisted the Turkish, British and Austrian flags over the citadel. For his exceptional leadership during the campaign he was appointed Knight of the Military Order of Maria Theresa. He also received military awards from numerous other countries.

=== Commander-in-Chief ===
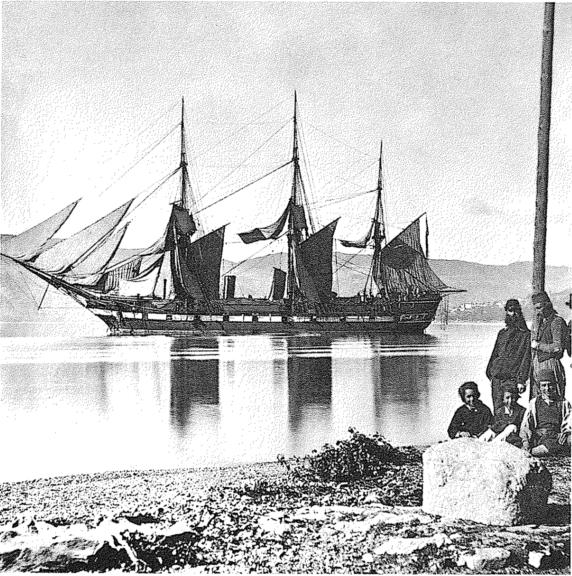
SMS Erzherzog Friedrich (1868)

In 1842 Friedrich sailed to Algeria and England. In 1844 he was promoted to the rank of vice admiral and took office as Commander-in-Chief of the Imperial Austrian Navy at the age of twenty-three. His appointment came after a mutiny by Venetian junior officers led by the sons of Admiral Baron Francesco Bandiera.

As Commander-in-Chief, Friedrich introduced many modernising reforms, aiming to make his country's naval force less "Venetian" and more "Austrian". In Austria there had until the end of the eighteenth century only been limited attempts at establishing a navy of its own. When the Habsburgs received the city of Venice along with Istria and Dalmatia following the Treaty of Campo Formio in 1797, this situation was changed considerably. The Venetian naval forces and facilities were handed over to Austria and became the basis of the formation of the future Austrian Navy. Until Friedrich's term as Commander-in-Chief it was however often felt that the force officially styled the "Austrian Navy" was in practice little more than Venetian crews and ships sailing under the Austrian flag.

Friedrich had a keen private interest in the fleet, and with him the Austrian naval force gained its first influential supporter from the ranks of the Imperial Family. This was crucial as sea power was never a priority of the Austrian foreign policy and the navy itself was relatively little known or supported by the public. It was only able to draw significant public attention and funds during the three short periods of its history when it was actively supported by an imperial prince. Following Friedrich's example, the archdukes Ferdinand Maximilian (1832–1867) and Franz Ferdinand (1863–1914) would later become active campaigners for naval matters.

The Austrian Chancellor Prince Klemens von Metternich proposed that Friedrich be named Grand Master of the Sovereign Military Order of Malta, but this was rejected by Pope Gregory XVI.

Friedrich's term as Commander-in-Chief of the Imperial Austrian Navy was cut short. He died of jaundice in Venice at the age of twenty-six, only three years after taking office.

The large sailboat SMS Erzherzog Friedrich and the battleship SMS Erzherzog Friedrich (1902) were named after him.

== Honours ==
He received the following awards:

- Austrian Empire:
  - Knight of the Golden Fleece, 1838
  - Knight of the Military Order of Maria Theresa, 1840
- Kingdom of Bavaria: Knight of St. Hubert, 1844
- Grand Duchy of Hesse: Grand Cross of the Ludwig Order
- Holy See: Grand Cross of St. Gregory the Great, in Diamonds
- Sovereign Military Order of Malta: Professed Knight and Grand Cross of Honour and Devotion, 1845
- Netherlands: Grand Cross of the Netherlands Lion
- Kingdom of Portugal: Grand Cross of the Tower and Sword
- Kingdom of Prussia:
  - Pour le Mérite (military), 30 November 1840
  - Knight of the Black Eagle, 4 September 1844
- Two Sicilies: Grand Cross of St. Ferdinand and Merit
- United Kingdom: Honorary Grand Cross of the Bath (military), 5 November 1842
- Russian Empire:
  - Knight of St. Andrew
  - Knight of St. Alexander Nevsky
  - Knight of the White Eagle
  - Knight of St. Anna, 1st Class
  - Knight of St. George, 4th Class

== Ancestry ==
Ancestors of Archduke Friedrich of Austria (1821–1847)

8. Francis I, Holy Roman Emperor
4. Leopold II, Holy Roman Emperor
9. Maria Theresa, Queen of Hungary
2. Archduke Charles, Duke of Teschen
10. Charles III of Spain
5. Infanta Maria Luisa of Spain
11. Princess Maria Amalia of Saxony
1. Archduke Friedrich of Austria
12. Charles Christian, Prince of Nassau-Weilburg
6. Frederick William, Prince of Nassau-Weilburg
13. Princess Carolina of Orange-Nassau
3. Princess Henrietta of Nassau-Weilburg
14. Wilhelm Georg, Burgrave of Kirchberg
7. Burgravine Louise Isabella of Kirchberg
15. Princess Isabelle Auguste Reuss of Greiz
