= Archduke Friedrich of Austria =

Archduke Friedrich of Austria may refer to several members of the House of Habsburg:

- Friedrich Ferdinand Leopold of Austria (1821–1847), Vice Admiral and Commander-in-Chief of the Imperial Austrian Navy
- Archduke Friedrich, Duke of Teschen (1856–1936), Supreme Commander of the Austro-Hungarian Army during World War I
