= Schildenfeld =

Schildenfeld is a surname. Notable people with the surname include:

- Gordon Schildenfeld (born 1985), Croatian footballer
- Leon Schiller de Schildenfeld (1887–1954), Polish theater and film director, critic and theoretician
- Zoë von Schildenfeld (1890–1981), Austrian writer
