= Princess Henrietta of Nassau-Weilburg =

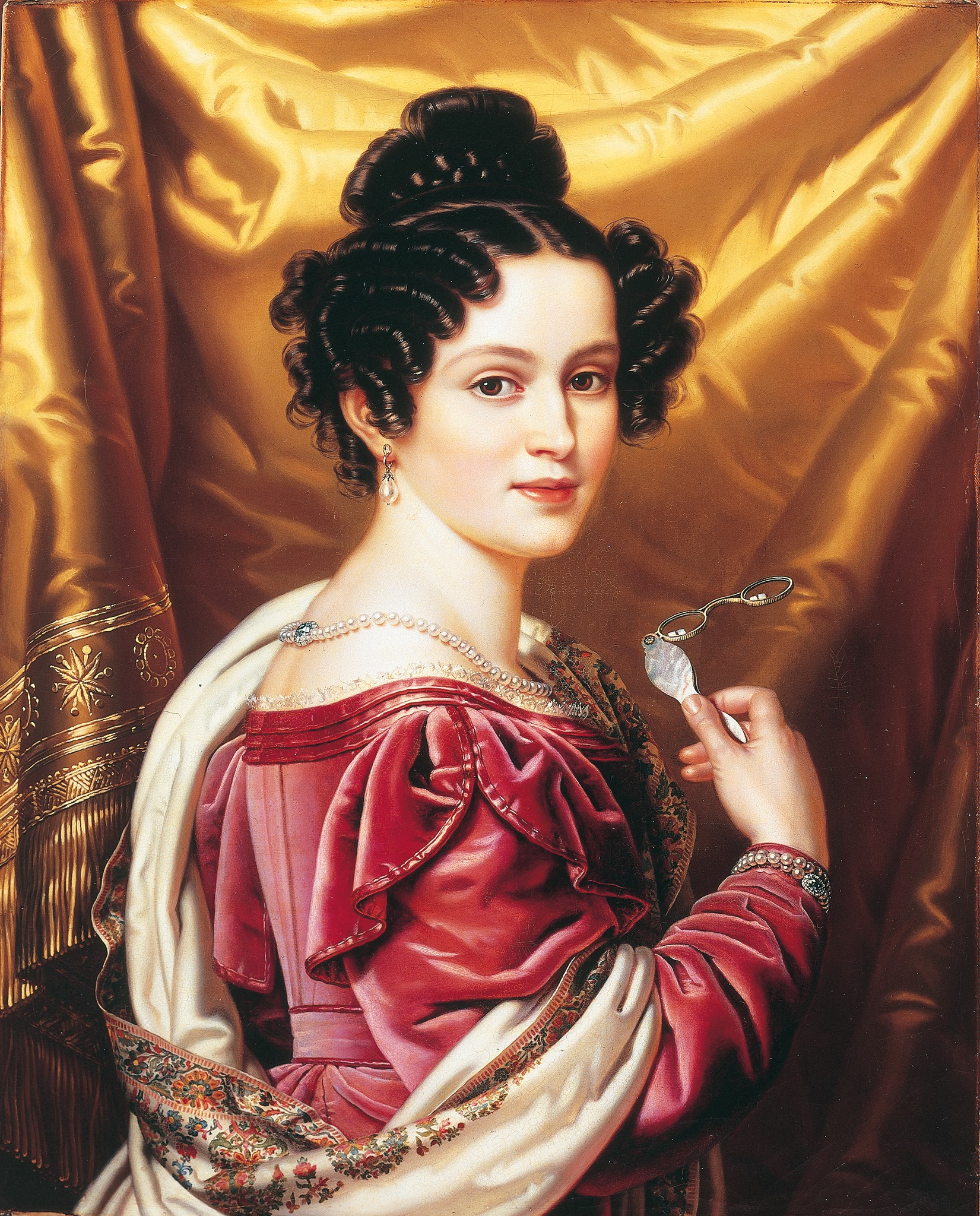
- Portrait, 1828

Duchess of Teschen
- Tenure: 10 February 1822 – 29 December 1829
- Born: 30 October 1797; Palace Eremitage, Bayreuth, Kingdom of Prussia
- Died: 29 December 1829 (aged 32); Vienna, Austrian Empire
- Burial: Imperial Crypt
- Spouse: Archduke Charles, Duke of Teschen (m. 1815)
- Issue Details...: Maria Theresa, Queen of the Two Sicilies; Archduke Albrecht, Duke of Teschen; Archduke Karl Ferdinand; Archduke Friedrich Ferdinand; Archduke Rudolph; Archduchess Maria Karoline; Archduke Wilhelm Franz
Names
- Henrietta Alexandrine Friederike Wilhelmine
- House: Nassau-Weilburg
- Father: Frederick William, Prince of Nassau-Weilburg
- Mother: Burgravine Louise Isabelle of Kirchberg

Henrietta Alexandrine Friederike Wilhelmine of Nassau-Weilburg, then of Nassau (30 October 1797 – 29 December 1829) was the wife of Archduke Charles, Duke of Teschen. Her husband was a notable general of the Napoleonic Wars and victor of the Battle of Aspern-Essling against Napoleon I of France.

== Family ==
Henrietta was the youngest daughter of Frederick William of Nassau-Weilburg and his wife Burgravine Louise Isabelle of Kirchberg. Her maternal grandparents were Buggraf Georg Wilhelm von Kirchberg, Count of Sayn-Wittgenstein-Hachenburg, and his wife, Princess Isabelle Auguste Reuss of Greiz. Her paternal grandparents were Karl Christian of Nassau-Weilburg and Princess Wilhelmine Carolina of Orange-Nassau, both members of the different branches of the ancient House of Nassau.

Wilhelmine Carolina was a daughter of William IV, Prince of Orange and his wife, Anne, Princess Royal. Anne was in turn the second child and eldest daughter of King George II of Great Britain and his wife, Margravine Caroline of Brandenburg-Ansbach.

== Marriage ==
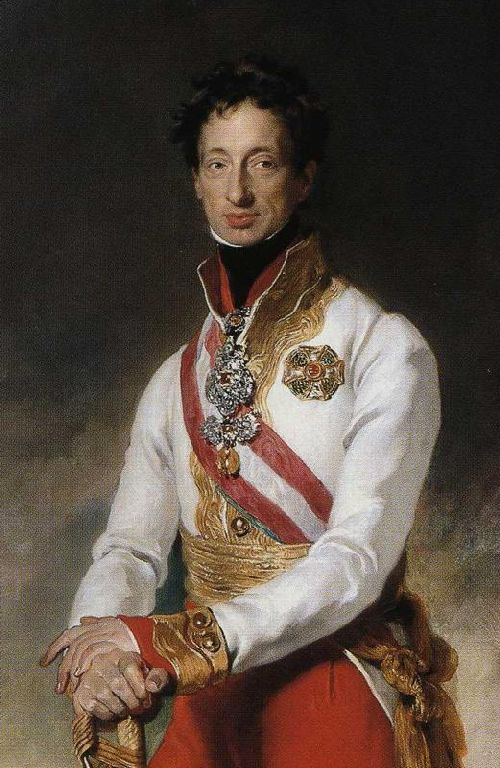
Henriette's husband: Archduke Charles, Duke of Teschen

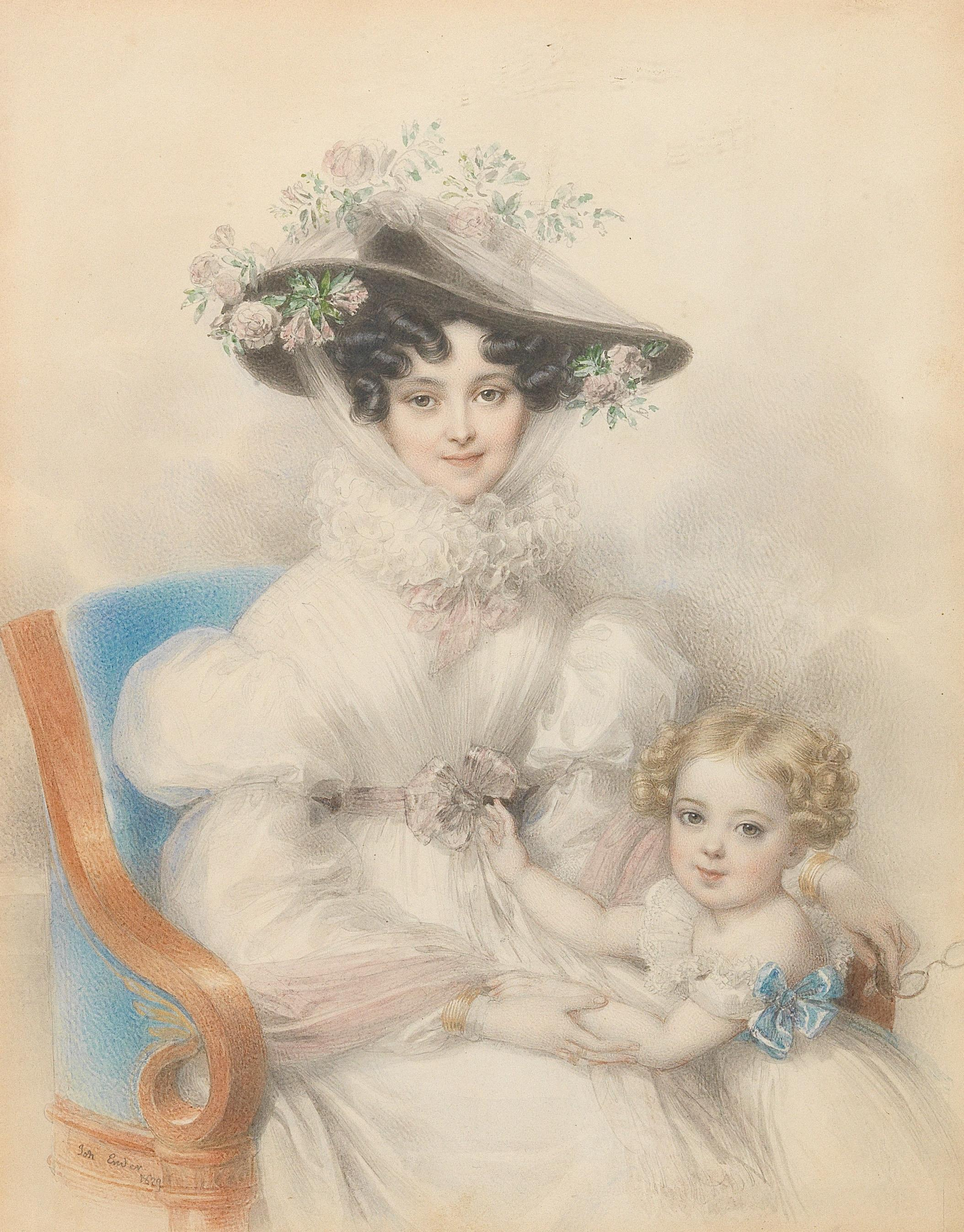
Colored lithograph with her daughter Karoline by Johann Ender, 1829

On 15 or 17 September 1815 in Weilburg, Henrietta was married to a much older Archduke Charles Louis of Austria. The bride was almost eighteen years old and the groom forty-four. Her husband was a son of Leopold II, Holy Roman Emperor and his wife, Infanta Maria Louisa of Spain. However he had been adopted and raised by his childless, but rich aunt, Archduchess Marie Christine of Austria and her husband Prince Albert of Saxony, Duke of Teschen. He was the heir to the vast Duchy of Teschen and would succeed in 1822. The marriage was allowed even though she was a Protestant and remained as such throughout her life, despite the fact that almost all members of House of Habsburg were staunch Catholics. This marriage was a very happy one with an agreement that all their children were to be raised as Catholics.

She has been known as the person who popularized the Christmas tree in Vienna after it was already introduced by Fanny von Arnstein in 1814 during the Vienna Congress.

Henrietta died young of scarlet fever, which she had caught while nursing her children through the same illness. She is the only Protestant buried in the Imperial Crypt in the Capuchin Church. This was allowed by order of her brother-in-law Emperor Francis I, who said, "She dwelt among us when she was alive, and so she shall in death".

Together, Henrietta and Charles had seven children, two girls and five boys, one of whom did not reach adulthood.

== Issue ==
Issue
Name	Portrait	Lifespan	Notes
Archduchess Maria Theresa; Queen of the Two Sicilies.		1816– 1867	Married Ferdinand II of the Two Sicilies, had issue
Archduke Albrecht; Duke of Teschen		1817– 1895	Married Princess Hildegard of Bavaria, had issue
Archduke Karl Ferdinand		1818– 1874	Married Archduchess Elisabeth Franziska of Austria, had issue
Archduke Friedrich Ferdinand; Commander-in-Chief of the Austrian Navy		1821– 1847	Died unmarried
Archduke Rudolph		1822– 1822	Died in childhood
Archduchess Maria Karoline		1825– 1915	Married her first cousin Archduke Rainer of Austria, no issue
Archduke Wilhelm Franz; Grand Master of the Teutonic Knights		1827– 1894	Died unmarried
