= Zoë von Schildenfeld =

Zoe von Schildenfeld, née Nicolits (1890 – 17 March 1981 in Salzburg) was an Austro-Hungarian, later Austrian author.

== Youth and Education ==
Born into a wealthy family of Greek origin, Schildenfeld was sent to the best schools available for girls at that time, including the Stella Matutina Institute as well as schools in England and Switzerland. As a young girl already, she developed an interest in literature and started writing in prose and verse. With several of her works published, she applied to Vienna University, but, being female, was denied admittance, a common practice back then. She therefore studied literature and poetry with private instructors. Finally admitted to university during the Great war, she earned a master's degree and a doctorate in German and English literature.

== Archduke Eugen ==
In 1912, Schildenfels was introduced to Archduke Eugen of Austria-Teschen, hereditary Grand Master of the Teutonic Knights at a literary circle in Innsbruck. She was later made a "Familiare", i.e. an associated member of the lay charity organisation of the order. When Eugen had to leave Austria due to Anti-Habsburg legislation after the collapse of the monarchy, Schildenberg became custodian of his private possessions and arranged for him to receive his rightfully earned income in spite of the restrictive Austrian currency regulations at that time.

When Archduke Eugen was permitted to return to Austria in 1934, it was Schildenfeld who oversaw his household. Following the Anschluß of Austria to Germany in 1938, Eugen, as an outspoken critic of the Nazi-movement was harassed by the GESTAPO and was put under de facto house arrest in a rented house at Hietzing. Only his status as a former Field-Marshal protected him from worse. With Schildenfeld at his side as confidante and lady companion, Eugen survived the Second World War and the flight to the Tyrol in 1945. The Archduke was held in high esteem by the commanders of the French occupation Force and when Schildenfeld arranged public celebrations in Innsbruck on occasion of his 90th birthday in 1953, she did so with official French support. Eugen died in 1954, in his will, he left her his private property. From 1955 on, she travelled extensively and had homes in Vienna, Salzburg, Strobl and St. Gilgen.

== Personal life and Family ==
In 1914, on the eve of war, she married 1st Lieutenant Rudolph von Schildenfeld, a cavalry officer and later aide-de-camp to Field-Marshal Conrad von Hotzendorf, who was to survive the war, but died young in 1938 due to war wounds. They had no children.

== Works ==
- Bruder Baum,
- Zoë Schildenfeld (1949). Christine. Roman. - Innsbruck, Wien: Tyrolia-Verl. (1949). 236 S. 8° (Tyrolia-Volksromane.). Tyrolia-Verlag.
- Zoe von Schildenfeld (1950). Von Ewigem. Gedichte u. Sprüche. - Innsbruck: Univ. Verl. Wagner 1950. 68 S. 8°. Innsbruck: Univ. Verlag Wagner.
- Gedichte (private edition 1953), Basel
- Zoë von Schildenfeld (co-authored with Hugo Rahner and Oskar Regele) (1963). Erzherzog Eugen, 1863-1963: ein Gedenkbuch. Innsbruck: F. Rauch.
- Zoë von Schildenfeld (1967). Der grosse Sämann. Europäischer Verlag.
- Totenlieder
- Briefe an das Jenseits / Zoe von Schildenfeld. - Innsbruck : Rauch, ©1977. - 47 p.; 21 cm. 1977
- Innumerable articles in newspapers, journals etc.
