= Archduke Charles, Duke of Teschen =

Austrian archduke and general (1771–1847)

Archduke Charles
- Duke of Teschen, Royal Prince of Hungary, Bohemia and Croatia
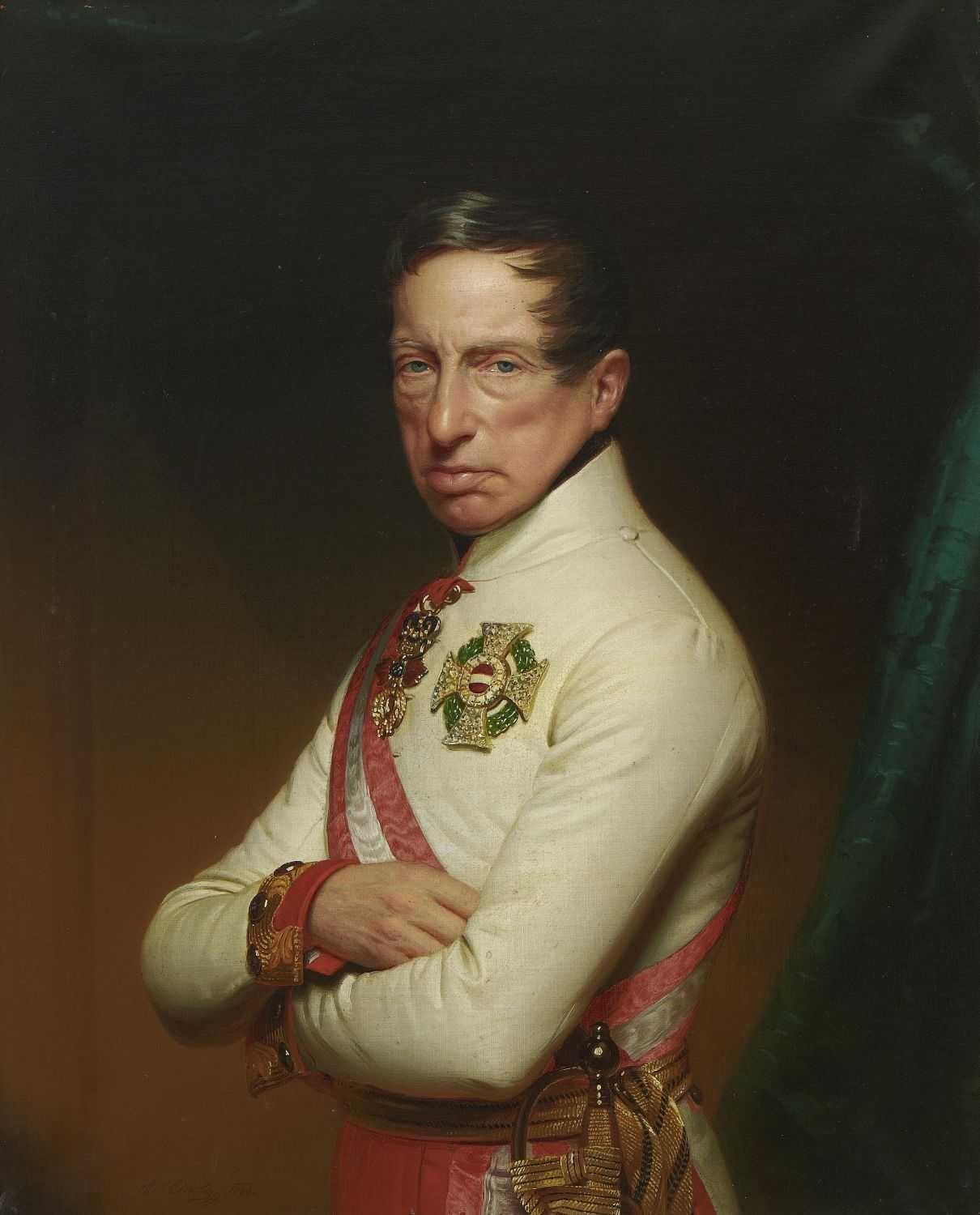
- Portrait by Anton Einsle

Duke of Teschen
- Reign: 10 February 1822 – 30 April 1847
- Predecessor: Albert Casimir
- Successor: Albrecht
- Born: Charles Louis John Joseph Lawrence; 5 September 1771; Florence, Grand Duchy of Tuscany
- Died: 30 April 1847 (aged 75); Vienna, Austrian Empire
- Burial: Imperial Crypt, Vienna
- Spouse: Henrietta of Nassau-Weilburg (m. 1815; died 1829)
- Issue Detail: Maria Theresa, Queen of the Two Sicilies; Archduke Albrecht, Duke of Teschen; Archduke Karl Ferdinand; Archduke Frederick Ferdinand; Archduchess Maria Karoline; Archduke Wilhelm Franz
Names
- Karl Ludwig Johann Josef Lorenz
- House: Habsburg-Lorraine
- Father: Leopold II, Holy Roman Emperor
- Mother: Maria Luisa of Spain
- Religion: Roman Catholicism
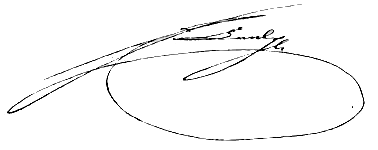
- Signature

Military service
- Allegiance: Holy Roman Empire; Austrian Empire
- Branch/service: Imperial Army; Imperial and Royal Army
- Years of service: 1792–1809
- Rank: Lieutenant field marshal
- Commands: Imperial and Royal Army
- Battles/wars: See list: French Revolutionary Wars; War of the First Coalition; Battle of Jemappes; Battle of Aldenhoven; Battle of Neerwinden; Battle of Tournay; Battle of Fleurus; Rhine campaign of 1796; Battle of Wetzlar; Battle of Kehl (1796); Battle of Ettlingen; Battle of Neresheim; Battle of Theiningen; Battle of Amberg; Battle of Würzburg; Battle of Limburg (1796); Battle of Emmendingen; Battle of Schliengen; Battle of Valvasone; Battle of Tarvis (1797); War of the Second Coalition; Battle of Ostrach; Battle of Stockach; First Battle of Zurich; Battle of Mannheim; Napoleonic Wars; War of the Third Coalition; Battle of Verona; Battle of Caldiero; War of the Fifth Coalition; Battle of Teugen-Hausen; Battle of Abensberg; Battle of Eckmühl; Battle of Ratisbon; Battle of Aspern-Essling; Battle of Wagram; Battle of Znaim

Coat of Arms of Archduke Charles, Duke of Teschen
- Coat of Arms of Archduke Charles, Duke of Teschen, showing the batons of a field marshal of the Austrian Army and the black cross of the Grand Master of the Teutonic Order (1801–1804)

Archduke Charles Louis John Joseph Lawrence of Austria, Duke of Teschen (German: Erzherzog Karl Ludwig Johann Josef Lorenz von Österreich, Herzog von Teschen; 5 September 1771 – 30 April 1847) was an Austrian field marshal, the third son of Emperor Leopold II and Maria Luisa of Spain. He was also the younger brother of Francis II, Holy Roman Emperor. He had epilepsy, but achieved respect both as a commander and as a reformer of the Austrian Army. He was considered one of Napoleon's most formidable opponents and one of the greatest generals of the French Revolutionary and Napoleonic Wars. Charles wrote several military works as well.

He began his career fighting the revolutionary armies of France. Early in the wars of the First Coalition, he saw victory at Neerwinden in 1793, before being defeated at Wattignies in 1793 and Fleurus in 1794. In 1796, as chief of all Austrian forces on the Rhine, Charles defeated Jean-Baptiste Jourdan at Amberg, Würzburg and Limburg, and then won victories at Wetzlar, Emmendingen and Schliengen that forced Jean Victor Marie Moreau to withdraw across the Rhine. He also defeated opponents at Ostrach, Stockach, Zürich and Mannheim in 1799. He reformed Austria's armies to adopt the nation-at-arms principle. In 1809, he entered the War of the Fifth Coalition and inflicted Napoleon's first major setback at Aspern-Essling, before suffering a defeat at the bloody Battle of Wagram. After Wagram, Charles saw no more significant action in the Napoleonic Wars.

As a military strategist, Charles was able to successfully execute complex and risky manoeuvres of troops. However, his contemporary Carl von Clausewitz criticised his rigidity and adherence to "geographic" strategy. Many Austrians nevertheless remember Charles as a hero of the French Revolutionary and Napoleonic Wars.

== Youth and early career ==
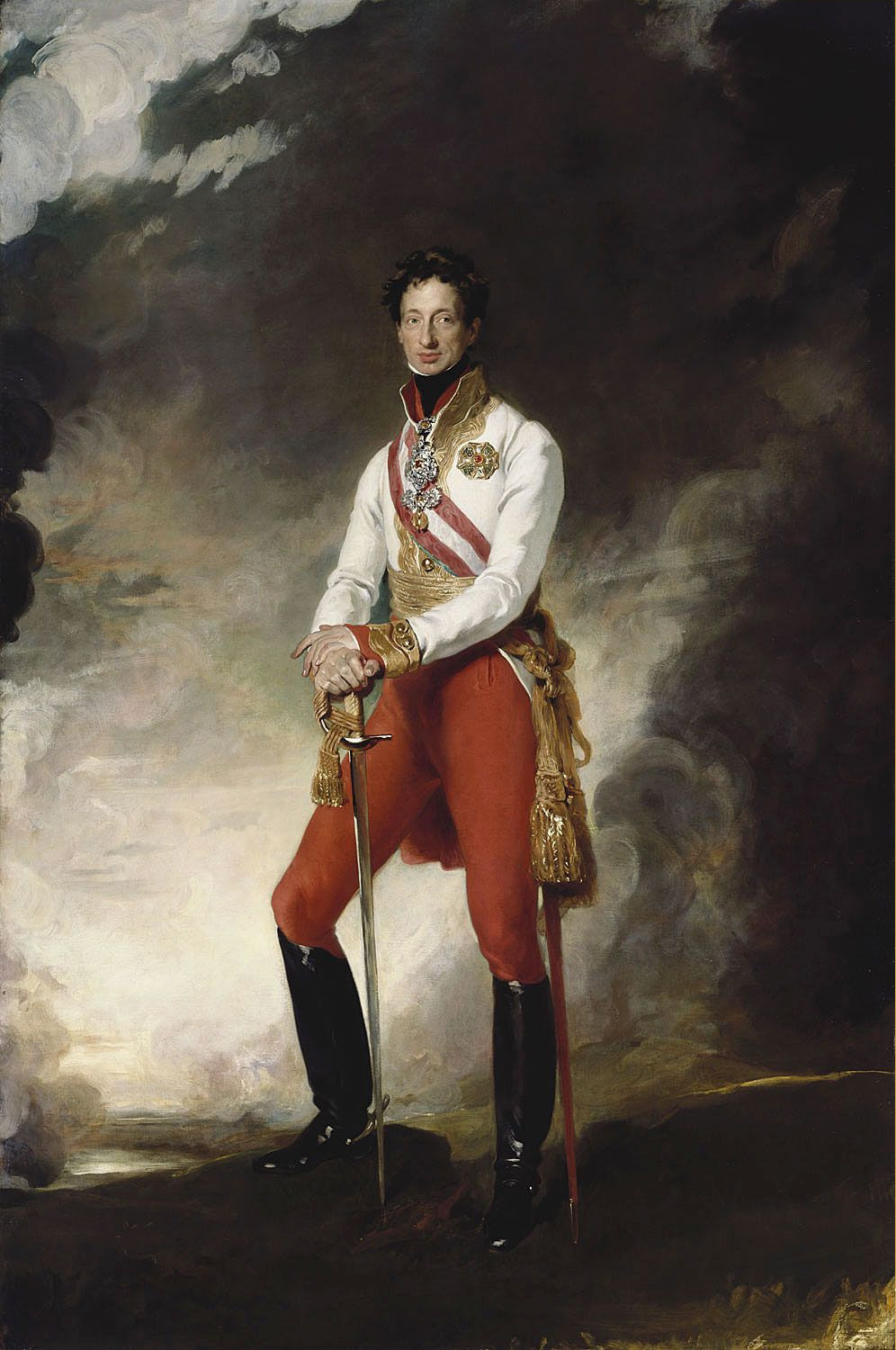
Portrait of Archduke Charles by Thomas Lawrence, 1819

Charles was born in Florence, Tuscany. His father, then Grand Duke of Tuscany, generously permitted Charles's childless aunt Archduchess Maria Christina of Austria and her husband Albert of Saxe-Teschen to adopt and raise the boy in Vienna. Charles spent his youth in Tuscany, at Vienna and in the Austrian Netherlands, where he began his career of military service in the wars of the French Revolution. He commanded a brigade at the Battle of Jemappes (1792), and in the campaign of 1793 distinguished himself at the Action of Aldenhoven and the Battle of Neerwinden. In this year he became Governor of the Habsburg Netherlands, an office he lost with the occupation of the Low Countries by the French revolutionaries in 1794. The year he became Governor he also received the army rank of lieutenant field marshal. Shortly thereafter another promotion saw him made Feldzeugmeister (equivalent of Lieutenant General). In the remainder of the war in the Low Countries he held high commands, and was present at the Battle of Fleurus.

In 1795 he served on the Rhine, and in the following year, he was entrusted with chief control of all the Austrian forces on that river. His conduct of the operations against Jourdan and Moreau in 1796 marked him out at once as one of the greatest generals in Europe. At first, falling back carefully and avoiding a decision, he finally marched away, leaving a mere screen in front of Moreau. Falling upon Jourdan, he beat him in the battles of Amberg (August), Würzburg and Limburg (September), and drove him over the Rhine with great loss. He then turned upon Moreau's army, which he defeated and forced out of Germany after the battles of Wetzlar, Emmendingen and Schliengen.

== Napoleonic Wars ==
In 1797 he was sent to arrest the victorious march of General Bonaparte in Italy, and he conducted the retreat of the over-matched Austrians with the highest skill. In the campaign of 1799 he once more opposed Jourdan, whom he defeated in the battles of Ostrach and Stockach, following up his success by invading Switzerland and defeating Masséna in the First Battle of Zurich, after which he re-entered Germany and drove the French once more over the Rhine after winning at Mannheim in 1799.

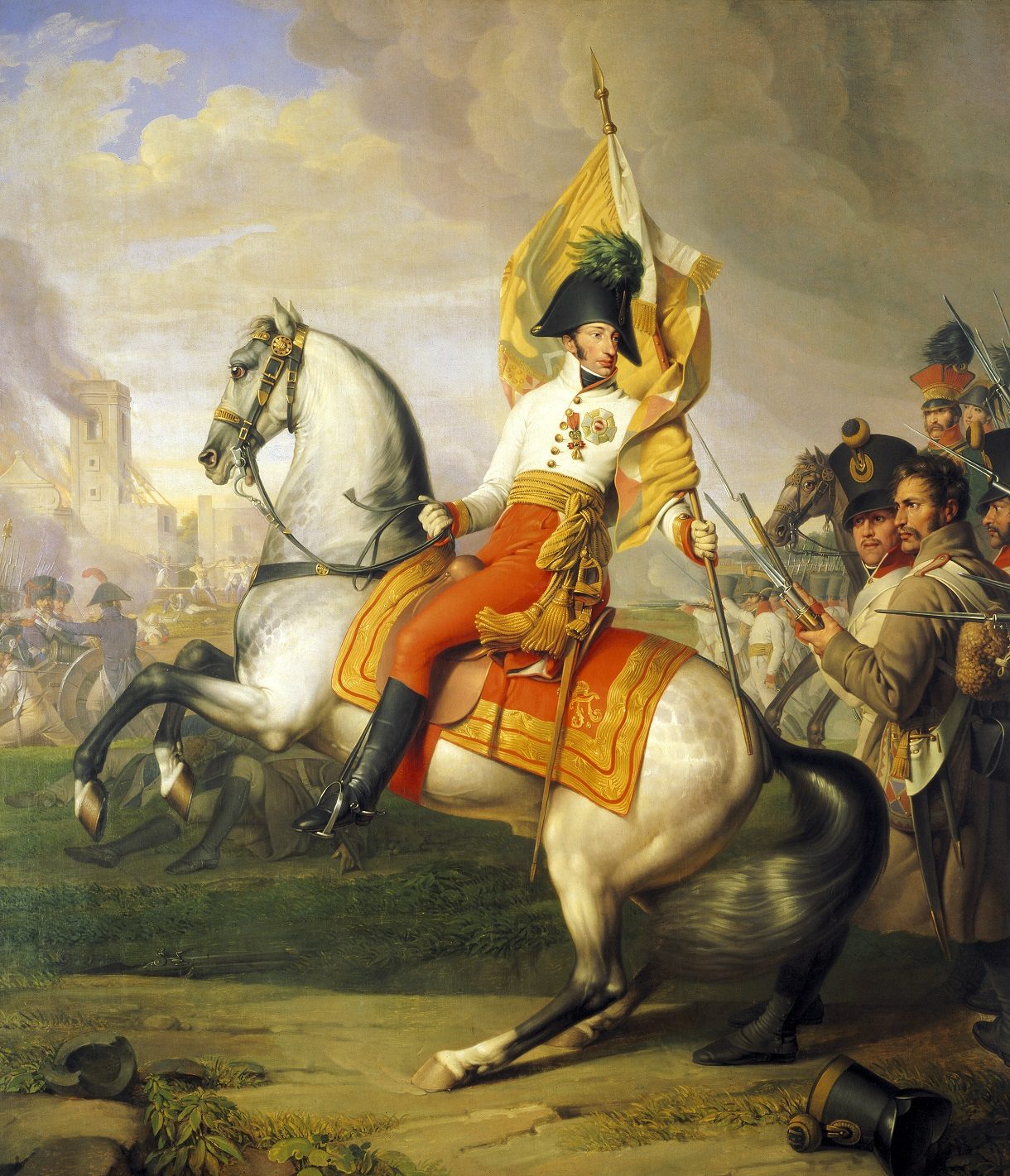
Victorious Archduke Charles of Austria during the Battle of Aspern-Essling (21–22 May 1809)

Ill-health, however, forced him to retire to Bohemia, but he was soon recalled to undertake the task of checking Moreau's advance on Vienna. The result of the Battle of Hohenlinden had, however, doomed the attempt, and the archduke had to make the armistice of Steyr. His popularity was now such that the Perpetual Diet of Regensburg, which met in 1802, resolved to erect a statue in his honour and to give him the title of saviour of his country, but Charles refused both distinctions.

In the short and disastrous war of 1805 Archduke Charles commanded what was intended to be the main army in Italy, but events made Germany the decisive theatre of operations; Austria sustained defeat on the Danube, and the archduke was defeated by Massena in the Battle of Caldiero. With the conclusion of peace he began his active work of army reorganisation, which was first tested on the field in 1809.

In 1806 Francis II (now Francis I of Austria) named the Archduke Charles, already a field marshal, as Commander in Chief of the Austrian army and Head of the Council of War. Supported by the prestige of being the only general who had proved capable of defeating the French, he promptly initiated a far-reaching scheme of reform, which replaced the obsolete methods of the 18th century. The chief characteristics of the new order were the adoption of the nation in arms principle and the adoption of French war organization and tactics. The army reforms were not yet completed by the war of 1809, in which Charles acted as commander in chief, yet even so it proved a far more formidable opponent than the old and was only defeated after a desperate struggle involving Austrian victories and large loss of life on both sides.

Its initial successes were neutralised by the reverses of Abensberg, Landshut and Eckmühl but, after the evacuation of Vienna, the archduke won a strong victory at the Battle of Aspern-Essling but soon afterwards lost at the Battle of Wagram after heavy casualties on both sides. At the end of the campaign the archduke gave up all his military offices.

In 1808, when Napoleon had crowned his brother Joseph king of Spain, Archduke Charles had said to his brother, Emperor Francis II, "Now we know what Napoleon wants – he wants everything".

== Later life ==
Archduke Charles with family

When Austria joined the ranks of the allies during the War of the Sixth Coalition, Charles was not given a command and the post of commander-in-chief of the allied Army of Bohemia went to the Prince of Schwarzenberg. Charles spent the rest of his life in retirement, except for a short time in 1815 when he was military governor of the Fortress Mainz. In 1822 he succeeded to the duchy of Saxe-Teschen. In 1830 Charles was a candidate for the throne of Belgium.

On 15 September/17 September 1815 in Weilburg, Charles married Princess Henrietta of Nassau-Weilburg (1797–1829). She was a daughter of Frederick William of Nassau-Weilburg (1768–1816) and his wife Burgravine Louise Isabelle of Kirchberg.

Charles died at Vienna on 30 April 1847. He is buried in tomb 122 in the New Vault of the Imperial Crypt in Vienna. An equestrian statue was erected to his memory on the Heldenplatz in Vienna in 1860.

== Assessment of his achievements ==
The caution which the archduke preached so earnestly in his strategic works, he displayed in practice only when the situation seemed to demand it, although his education certainly prejudiced him in favor of the defensive at all costs. He was at the same time capable of forming and executing the most daring offensive strategy, and his tactical skill in the handling of troops, whether in wide turning movements, as at Würzburg and Zürich, or in masses, as at Aspern and Wagram, was certainly equal to that of most leaders of his time, with only a few exceptions. Arthur Wellesley named Charles as the greatest general of his time. Charles was arguably the best commander ever produced by the House of Habsburg, and undoubtedly the most able Habsburg general of the French Revolutionary and Napoleonic era. Archduke Charles is credited with handing Napoleon his first major defeat. He has been described as the best general Republican France ever fought, with the exception of Alexander Suvorov.

Archduke Charles at the Battle of Ostrach

According to the Encyclopædia Britannica Eleventh Edition, his campaign of 1796 is considered almost faultless. That he sustained defeat in 1809 was due in part to the great numerical superiority of the French and their allies, and in part to the condition of his newly reorganized troops. His six weeks' inaction after the victory of Aspern is, however, open to unfavorable criticism. As a military writer, his position in the evolution of the art of war is very important, and his doctrines had naturally the greatest weight. Nevertheless, they cannot but be considered antiquated even in 1806. Caution and the importance of strategic points are the chief features of his system. The rigidity of his geographical strategy may be gathered from the prescription that "this principle is never to be departed from."

Again and again he repeated the advice that nothing should be hazarded unless one's army is completely secure, a rule which he himself neglected with such brilliant results in 1796. Strategic points, he says, not the defeat of the enemy's army, decide the fate of one's own country, and must constantly remain the general's main concern, a maxim which was never more remarkably disproved than in the war of 1809. The editor of the archduke's work is able to make but a feeble defense against Clausewitz's reproach that Charles attached more value to ground than to the annihilation of the foe. In his tactical writings the same spirit is conspicuous. His reserve in battle is designed to "cover a retreat."

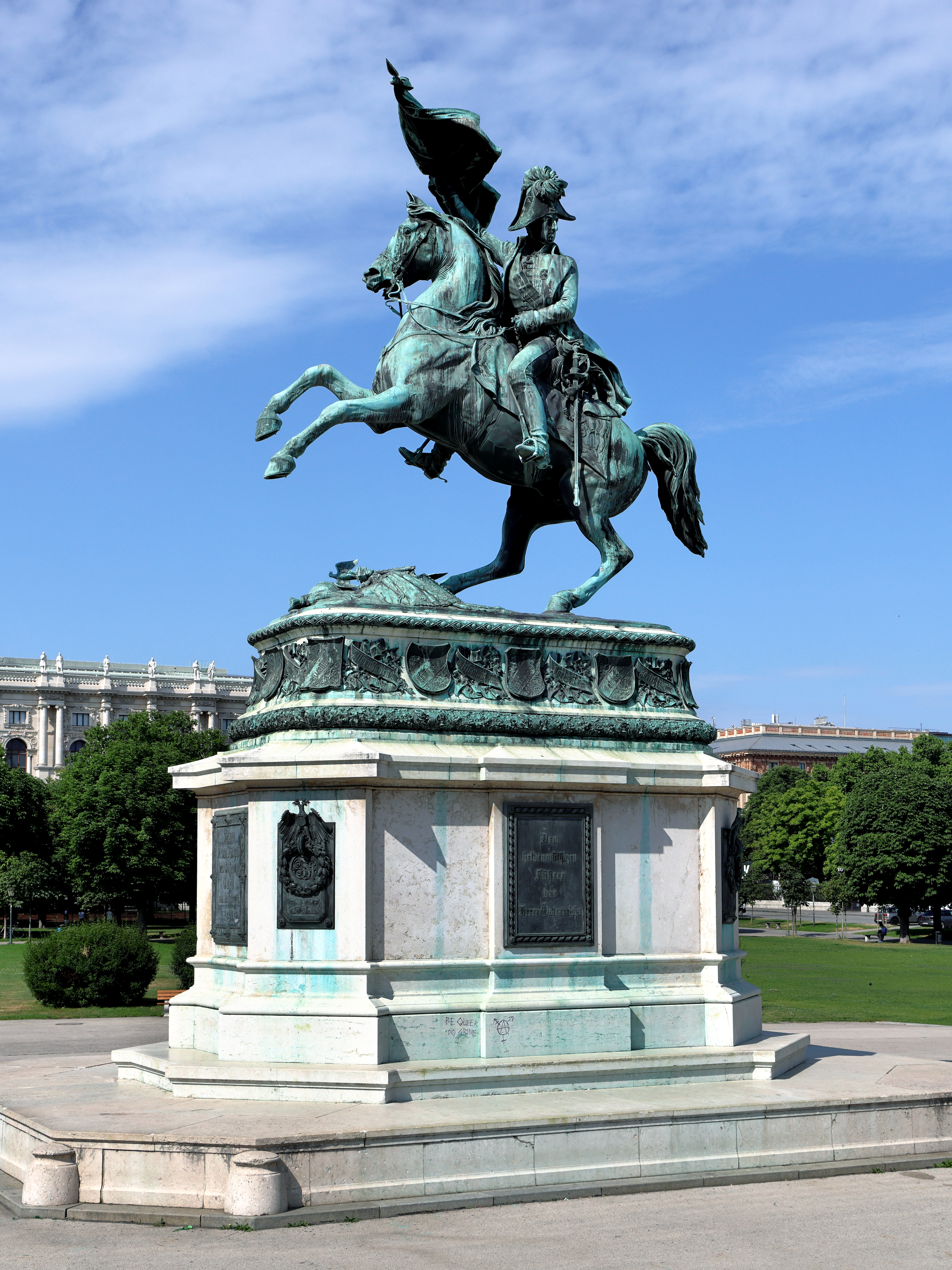
Statue of Archduke Charles on the Heldenplatz in Vienna

The influence of these principles was clearly shown in the maintenance of Königgrätz-Josefstadt in 1866 as a strategic point, which was preferred to the defeat of the separated Prussian armies, and in the strange plans produced in Vienna for the campaign of 1859, and in the almost unintelligible Battle of Montebello in the same year. The theory and the practice of Archduke Charles form one of the most curious contrasts in military history. In the one he is unreal, in the other he displayed, along with the greatest skill, a vivid activity which made him for long the most formidable opponent of Napoleon.

He also was the 831st Knight of the Order of the Golden Fleece in Austria.

=== Creation of the Austrian staff ===
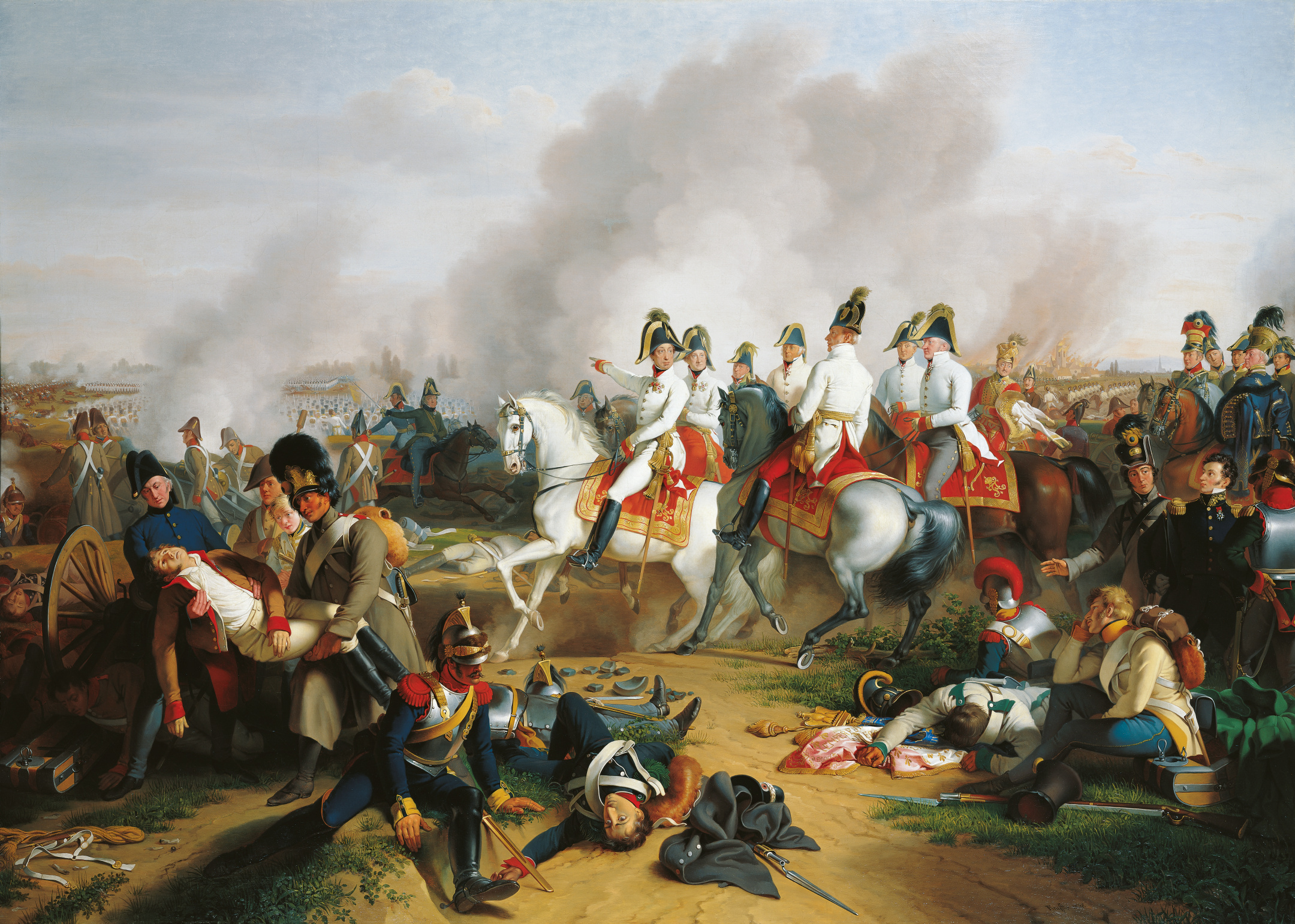
The Archduke Charles with his staff at the Battle of Aspern-Essling by Johann Peter Krafft, 1820

When Karl Mack von Leiberich became chief of staff of the army under Prince Josias of Saxe-Coburg-Saalfeld in the Netherlands, he issued the Instruktionspunkte fur die gesamte Herren Generals, the last of 19 points setting out the roles of staff officers, dealing with offensive and defensive operations, while helping the Commander-in-chief. In 1796, Archduke Charles augmented these with his own Observationspunkte, writing of the Chief of Staff: "he is duty bound to consider all possibilities related to operations and not view himself as merely carrying out those instructions". On 20 March 1801, Feldmarschalleutnant Duka became the world's first peacetime Generalquartiermeister at the head of the staff and the wartime role of the Chief of Staff was now focused on planning and operations to assist the Commander. Archduke Charles produced a new Dienstvorschrift on 1 September 1805, which divided the staff into three: 1) Political Correspondence; 2) the Operations Directorate, dealing with planning and intelligence; 3) the Service Directorate, dealing with administration, supply and military justice. The Archduke set out the position of a modern Chief of Staff: "The Chief of Staff stands at the side of the Commander-in-Chief and is completely at his disposal. His sphere of work connects him with no specific unit". "The Commander-in-Chief decides what should happen and how; his chief assistant works out these decisions, so that each subordinate understands his allotted task". With the creation of the Korps in 1809, each had a staff, whose chief was responsible for directing operations and executing the overall headquarters plan.

== Issue ==
Name	Birth	Death	Notes
Archduchess Maria Theresa of Austria	31 July 1816	8 August 1867	Married Ferdinand II of the Two Sicilies, had issue
Archduke Albert, Duke of Teschen	3 August 1817	2 February 1895	Married Princess Hildegard of Bavaria, had issue
Archduke Karl Ferdinand of Austria	29 July 1818	20 November 1874	Married Archduchess Elisabeth Franziska of Austria, had issue
Archduke Friedrich of Austria	14 May 1821	5 October 1847	Died unmarried
Archduke Rudolph of Austria	25 September 1822	11 October 1822	Died in childhood
Archduchess Maria Karoline of Austria	10 September 1825	17 July 1915	Married her first cousin Archduke Rainer Ferdinand of Austria, third son of Archduke Rainer Joseph of Austria and Princess Elisabeth of Savoy-Carignano
Archduke Wilhelm Franz of Austria	21 April 1827	29 July 1894	Died unmarried

== Honours ==
- Austrian Empire:
  - Knight of the Golden Fleece, 1790
  - Grand Cross of the Military Order of Maria Theresa, in Diamonds, 1793
- Kingdom of Bavaria: Knight of St. Hubert, 1844
- Empire of Brazil: Grand Cross of the Southern Cross
- Kingdom of France: Grand Cross of the Legion of Honour
- Kingdom of Prussia:
  - Knight of the Black Eagle, 4 October 1835
  - Knight of the Red Eagle, 1st Class
- Russian Empire:
  - Knight of St. Andrew
  - Knight of St. Alexander Nevsky
  - Knight of the White Eagle
  - Knight of St. Anna, 1st Class
- Grand Duchy of Tuscany: Grand Cross of St. Joseph
- Two Sicilies:
  - Knight of St. Januarius
  - Grand Cross of St. Ferdinand and Merit
- United Kingdom: Honorary Grand Cross of the Bath (military), 23 May 1834

== Ancestry ==
Ancestors of Archduke Charles, Duke of Teschen

8. Leopold, Duke of Lorraine
4. Francis I, Holy Roman Emperor
9. Élisabeth Charlotte of Orléans
2. Leopold II, Holy Roman Emperor
10. Charles VI, Holy Roman Emperor
5. Maria Theresa of Austria
11. Elisabeth Christine of Brunswick
1. Archduke Charles, Duke of Teschen
12. Philip V of Spain
6. Charles III of Spain
13. Elisabeth Farnese
3. Maria Luisa of Spain
14. Augustus III of Poland
7. Maria Amalia of Saxony
15. Maria Josepha of Austria

== Works ==
- Grundsätze der Kriegskunst für die Generale (1806)
- Grundsätze der Strategie erläutert durch die Darstellung des Feldzugs 1796 (1814)
- Geschichte des Feldzugs von 1799 in Deutschland und in der Schweiz (1819)

Archduke Charles, Duke of Teschen House of Habsburg-Lorraine Cadet branch of the House of Lorraine Born: 5 September 1771 Died: 30 April 1847
Regnal titles
Preceded by Albert Casimir	Duke of Teschen; 1822–1847	Succeeded by Albert
Government offices
Preceded by Maria Christina of Austria; Albert Casimir of Saxony	Governor of the Austrian Netherlands; 1793–1794	Office abolished
Honorary titles
Preceded by Archduke Maximilian Franz of Austria	Grand Master of the Teutonic Order; 1801–1804	Succeeded by Archduke Anton Victor of Austria
