= Archduchess Elisabeth Franziska of Austria =

Austrian archduchess (1831–1903)

Archduchess Elisabeth Franziska
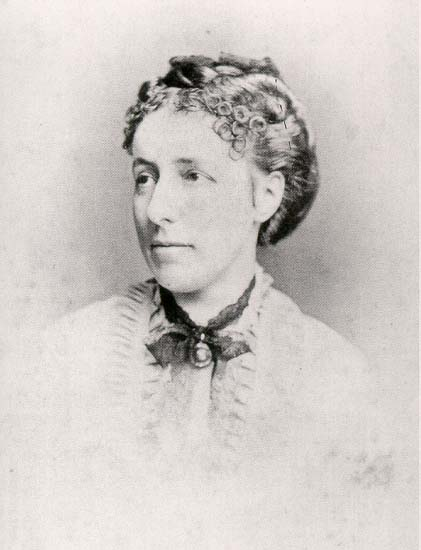
- Elisabeth Franziska c. 1850s
- Born: 17 January 1831; Buda, Kingdom of Hungary
- Died: 14 February 1903 (aged 72); Palais Erzherzog Albrecht, Vienna, Austria-Hungary
- Burial: Baden bei Wien
- Spouse: Archduke Ferdinand Karl Viktor of Austria-Este (m. 1846; died 1849) Archduke Karl Ferdinand of Austria (m. 1854; died 1874)
- Issue: Maria Theresia, Queen of Bavaria; Archduke Franz Joseph; Archduke Friedrich, Duke of Teschen; Maria Christina, Queen of Spain; Archduke Charles Stephen; Archduke Eugen; Archduchess Maria Eleonora
Names
- Elisabeth Franziska Maria
- House: Habsburg-Lorraine
- Father: Archduke Joseph, Palatine of Hungary
- Mother: Duchess Maria Dorothea of Württemberg

Archduchess Elisabeth Franziska Maria of Austria (17 January 1831 – 14 February 1903) was born in Ofen (Buda), Hungary. She was the daughter of Palatine Joseph of Hungary and his third wife Maria Dorothea of Württemberg.

== First marriage ==
Her first marriage, on 4 October 1847 in Vienna, was to her first cousin once removed Archduke Ferdinand Karl Viktor of Austria-Este, with whom she had one daughter:

- Archduchess Maria Theresia of Austria-Este (1849–1919), wife of King Ludwig III of Bavaria and Jacobite heir to the thrones of England, Ireland, and Scotland.

Ferdinand Karl died just a few years later after a short period of illness.

== Second marriage ==
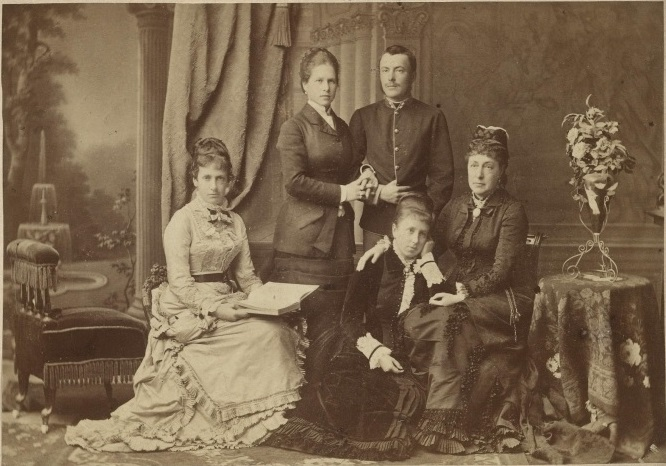
Archduchess Elisabeth Franziska and her children: Friedrich (with his wife Isabella), Maria Christina and Maria Theresia, 1878

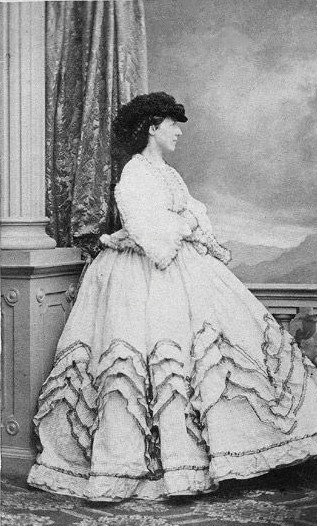
Archduchess Elisabeth Franziska of Austria, 1860s

Her second marriage, on 18 April 1854, in Vienna, was to her first cousin Archduke Karl Ferdinand of Austria, by whom she had six children:

- Archduke Franz Joseph of Austria (1855–1855)
- Archduke Friedrich of Austria, Duke of Teschen (1856–1936)
- Archduchess Maria Christina of Austria (1858–1929), Queen of Spain, wife of King Alfonso XII of Spain
- Archduke Charles Stephen of Austria (1860–1933)
- Archduke Eugen of Austria (1863–1954)
- Archduchess Maria Eleonora of Austria (1864–1864)

Elisabeth remained in vigorous health during her later years. In 1903, at the age of 72, Elisabeth began to suffer from sinusitis and on 14 February, at 4pm, she died. Other sources state that she died of pneumonia after six days of illness. She is buried in Baden bei Wien, where there is a street named after her.

== Ancestry ==
Ancestors of Archduchess Elisabeth Franziska of Austria

8. Francis I, Holy Roman Emperor
4. Leopold II, Holy Roman Emperor
9. Maria Theresa of Austria
2. Archduke Joseph, Palatine of Hungary
10. Charles III of Spain
5. Infanta Maria Luisa of Spain
11. Princess Maria Amalia of Saxony
1. Archduchess Elisabeth Franziska of Austria
12. Frederick II Eugene, Duke of Württemberg
6. Duke Louis of Württemberg
13. Princess Friederike of Brandenburg-Schwedt
3. Duchess Maria Dorothea of Württemberg
14. Charles Christian, Prince of Nassau-Weilburg
7. Princess Henriette of Nassau-Weilburg
15. Princess Carolina of Orange-Nassau
