= Kirchberg an der Iller =

- Municipality
- Coat of arms

- Location of Kirchberg an der Iller within Biberach district
- Interactive map of Kirchberg an der Iller
- Location within Germany Location within Baden-Württemberg
- Coordinates: 48°7′56″N 10°4′50″E
- Country: Germany
- State: Baden-Württemberg
- Admin. region: Tübingen
- District: Biberach

Government
  - Mayor (2018–26): Jochen Stuber

Area
  - Total: 18.64 km^{2} (7.20 sq mi)
- Elevation: 535 m (1,755 ft)

Population (2025-12-31)
  - Total: 2,218
  - Density: 119.0/km^{2} (308.2/sq mi)
- Time zone: UTC+01:00 (CET)
  - Summer (DST): UTC+02:00 (CEST)
- Postal codes: 88486
- Dialling codes: 07354
- Vehicle registration: BC
- Website: www.kirchberg-iller.de

Kirchberg an der Iller (German pronunciation: [ˈkɪʁçbɛʁk ʔan deːɐ̯ ˈʔɪlɐ], lit. 'Kirchberg on the Iller') is a municipality in Baden-Württemberg in the south-west of Germany and in the very east of the "Landkreis Biberach". Biberach is the capital of the district. Kirchberg is located in Swabia near the small river Iller, which forms part the border between Baden-Württemberg and Bavaria.

Kirchberg was first mentioned in 806 in the Codex of the St. Gallen Closters.

There are two even smaller villages called Sinningen and Nordhofen which belong to Kirchberg. All together there live about 1,900 people. In Sinningen there is a camping ground near a small lake which is called Baggersee. The biggest employer in Kirchberg is Karl Miller GmbH. Here work about 200 people producing metal housing. There are also several associations like the sportsclub TSV Kirchberg, choirs, an auxiliary fire brigade, other sports clubs like tennis etc. Kirchberg first appears in an account of the monastery St. Gallen in 806 AD.

== Demographics ==
Population development:

Year	Inhabitants
1990	1,737
2001	1,824
2011	1,927
2021	2,149
