= Burgravine Louise Isabella of Kirchberg =

Burgravine Louise Isabelle of Kirchberg
- Princess consort of Nassau-Weilburg
- Born: 19 April 1772; Hachenburg
- Died: 6 January 1827 (aged 54); Vienna, Austrian Empire
- Spouse: Frederick William, Prince of Nassau-Weilburg (m. 1788; died 1816)
- Issue: William, Duke of Nassau; Princess Auguste Luise Wilhelmine; Archduchess Henrietta, Duchess of Teschen; Prince Friedrich Wilhelm
Names
- German: Luise Isabelle Alexandrine Auguste
- House: Burggrafen von Kirchberg
- Father: Wilhelm Georg, Count of Sayn-Hachenburg, Burgrave of Kirchberg
- Mother: Isabella Auguste Reuss of Greiz

Louise Isabelle Alexandrine Augusta, Countess of Sayn-Hachenburg, Burgravine of Kirchberg, full German name: Luise Isabelle Alexandrine Auguste, Gräfin zu Sayn-Hachenburg, Burggräfin von Kirchberg (19 April 1772 – 6 January 1827) was the Princess consort of Nassau-Weilburg (28 November 1788 – 9 January 1816) through her marriage to Frederick William, Prince of Nassau-Weilburg.

== Early life ==
Louise Isabelle was born as the only child of Burgrave Georg Wilhelm von Kirchberg, Count of Sayn-Hachenburg and Princess Isabelle Auguste Reuss of Greiz, both members of an ancient German nobility.

== Marriage and family ==
As she was the only heir to her father Louise married Frederick William, Hereditary Prince of Nassau-Weilburg, fifth child and eldest surviving son of Charles Christian, Prince of Nassau-Weilburg and his wife, Princess Carolina of Orange-Nassau, on 31 July 1788 in Hachenburg. Frederick William succeeded to his father Charles Christian upon his death on 28 November 1788.

They had:

- William, Duke of Nassau (14 June 1792 - 20 August/30 August 1839)
- Auguste Luise Wilhelmine of Nassau-Weilburg (Weilburg, 5 January 1794 - Weilburg, 11 April 1796)
- Henriette Alexandrine Friederike Wilhelmine (30 October 1797 – 29 December 1829). Married Archduke Charles, Duke of Teschen
- Friedrich Wilhelm of Nassau-Weilburg, then of Nassau (Bayreuth, 15 December 1799 - Vienna, 6 January 1845). He married on 7 June 1840 Anna Ritter, Edle von Vallyemare (Vienna, 21 June 1802 - Paris, 17 June 1864), daughter of Joseph Ritter, Edler von Vallyemare (1772-1832), widow of Johann Baptist Brunold, created Gräfin von Tiefenbach in 1840. This was a morganatic marriage.

Burgravine Louise Isabella of Kirchberg House of Burgraves of Kirchberg Born: 19 April 1772 Died: 6 January 1827
Regnal titles
Preceded by Princess Carolina of Orange-Nassau	Princess consort of Nassau-Weilburg; 28 November 1788 – 9 January 1816	Succeeded by Princess Louise of Saxe-Hildburghausen
