= Frederick William, Prince of Nassau-Weilburg =

Prince of Nassau-Weilburg from 1788 to 1816

Frederick William
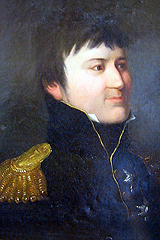

Prince of Nassau-Weilburg
- Reign: 28 November 1788 – 9 January 1816
- Predecessor: Charles Christian
- Successor: William
- Born: 25 October 1768; The Hague
- Died: 9 January 1816 (aged 47); Weilburg
- Spouse: Burgravine Louise Isabelle of Kirchberg (m. 1788)
- Issue: William, Duke of Nassau; Princess Auguste; Archduchess Henrietta, Duchess of Teschen; Prince Friedrich Wilhelm
- House: Nassau-Weilburg
- Father: Charles Christian, Prince of Nassau-Weilburg
- Mother: Princess Carolina of Orange-Nassau

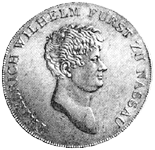
Prince Frederick William in an old coin.

Frederick William, Prince of Nassau-Weilburg (Friedrich Wilhelm, 25 October 1768, The Hague – 9 January 1816, Weilburg) was a ruler of Nassau-Weilburg. He was created Prince of Nassau and reigned jointly with his cousin, Prince Frederick Augustus of Nassau-Usingen, who became Duke of Nassau. Frederick William died in January 1816, only two months before his cousin. Both men were succeeded by Frederick William's son, William.

== Family ==
Frederick William was the eldest surviving son of Karl Christian of Nassau-Weilburg and Princess Wilhelmine Carolina of Orange-Nassau.

Wilhelmine Carolina was a daughter of William IV, Prince of Orange and Anne, Princess Royal and Princess of Orange. Anne was in turn the eldest daughter of George II of Great Britain and Caroline of Ansbach.

== Marriage and children ==
On 31 July 1788 in Hachenburg, Frederick William married Burgravine Louise Isabelle of Kirchberg (Hachenburg, 19 April 1772 – Vienna, 6 January 1827). The groom was almost 20 years old and the bride only 16. At the time, he was still the heir to the principality. His father died on 28 November of the same year and Frederick William succeeded him.

They had four children:

- William, Duke of Nassau (14 June 1792 – 20 August/30 August 1839). Married firstly Princess Louise of Saxe-Hildburghausen; married secondly Princess Pauline of Württemberg.
- Auguste Luise Wilhelmine of Nassau-Weilburg (Weilburg, 5 January 1794 – Weilburg, 11 April 1796).
- Henrietta of Nassau (30 October 1797 – 29 December 1829). Married Archduke Charles, Duke of Teschen
- Friedrich Wilhelm of Nassau-Weilburg, then of Nassau (Bayreuth, 15 December 1799 – Vienna, 6 January 1845). He married on 7 June 1840 Anna Ritter, Edle von Vallyemare (Vienna, 21 June 1802 – Paris, 19 July 1864), created Gräfin von Tiefenbach in 1840, widow of Johann Baptist Brunold. Their only daughter was:
  - Wilhelmine Brunold (Altzgersdorf, 5 July 1834 – Geneva, 12 December 1892), created in 1844 Gräfin von Tiefenbach, married in Paris on 30 October 1856 and divorced in 1872 Émile de Girardin (né Émile Delamothe) (Paris, 22 June 1802 – Paris, 27 April 1881).

== Ancestry ==
Ancestors of Frederick William, Prince of Nassau-Weilburg

8. John Ernst, Count of Nassau-Weilburg
4. Charles August, Prince of Nassau-Weilburg
9. Maria Polyxena of Leiningen-Dagsburg-Hartenburg
2. Charles Christian, Prince of Nassau-Weilburg
10. George August, Count of Nassau-Idstein
5. Auguste Friederike of Nassau-Idstein
11. Henriette Dorothea of Oettingen-Oettingen
1. Frederick William, Prince of Nassau-Weilburg
12. John William Friso, Prince of Orange
6. William IV, Prince of Orange
13. Marie Louise of Hesse-Kassel
3. Princess Carolina of Orange-Nassau
14. George II of Great Britain
7. Anne, Princess Royal
15. Caroline of Ansbach

Frederick William, Prince of Nassau-Weilburg House of Nassau-Weilburg Cadet branch of the House of Nassau Born: 25 October 1768 Died: 9 January 1816
Regnal titles
Preceded by Karl Christian	Prince of Nassau-Weilburg; 1788–1816	Succeeded by Wilhelm
