= Archduke Leo Karl of Austria =

Archduke of Austria

Archduke Leo Karl
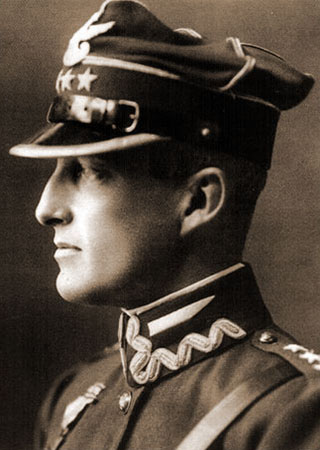
- Leo Karl in Polish Army uniform
- Born: 5 July 1893; Pula, Austria-Hungary
- Died: 28 April 1939 (aged 45); Bestwina, Poland
- Burial: Bestwina, Poland
- Spouse: Maria-Klothilde von Thuillières (m. 1922)
- Issue: Countess Maria Desiderata of Habsburg; Countess Mechtildis of Habsburg; Countess Elizabeth of Habsburg; Count Leo Stefan of Habsburg; Count Hugo of Habsburg
Names
- Leo Karl Maria Cyril-Methodius Habsburg-Lorraine
- House: Habsburg-Lorraine
- Father: Archduke Charles Stephen of Austria
- Mother: Archduchess Maria Theresa of Austria-Tuscany

Leo Karl Maria Cyril-Methodius Habsburg-Lorraine, Archduke of Austria (5 July 1893 – 28 April 1939) was an Austro-Hungarian and later a Polish military officer, and a member of the House of Habsburg-Lorraine. He was the fifth child and the second son of Archduke Charles Stephen of Austria and Archduchess Maria Theresia, Princess of Tuscany.

== Early life ==
In 1913, Leo and his younger brother, Wilhelm, enrolled at the Theresian Military Academy in Wiener-Neustadt. Upon reaching 20 years of age, which was the age of majority in the Habsburg family, he was inducted into the Order of the Golden Fleece, a chivalric order. At this age, he was also inducted into the Upper House of Parliament. Archduke Leo Karl was his father’s answer to the Eastern European question, and became the would-be Regent of the Habsburgs' zone of influence in the Balkan region. He served in the Austro-Hungarian Army until the dissolution of Austria-Hungary, after which he served with great distinction in the Polish Army.

== Marriage and family ==
In October 1922, he married Austrian noblewoman Maria-Klothilde von Thuillières Gfn von Montjoye-Vaufrey et de la Roche (1893–1978), known among family as "Maja", at St. Stephen Cathedral in Vienna. The marriage was acceptable, although morganatic. Their children were granted the title of Count of Habsburg.

- Countess Maria Desiderata (3 August 1923 - 6 October 1988) - married Count Wolfgang von Hartig (13 August 1922 - 20 January 1995) in 1947, divorcing in 1965; they have children.
- Countess Mechtildis of Habsburg (14 August 1924 - 2000) - married Count Manfred Piatti (22 July 1924 - 1995) in 1948; they have children.
- Countess Elizabeth of Habsburg (1927-2014) - unmarried; no children.
- Count Leo Stefan of Habsburg (12 June 1928 – 3 February 2020) - married 1st Gabriele Kunert (15 June 1935 - 20 October 1975) in 1962 and divorcing in 1969; they have children; married 2nd Heide Aigner (born 16 October 1942) in 1973; they have children.

== Later life ==
Monarchical styles of Archduke Leo Karl of Austria
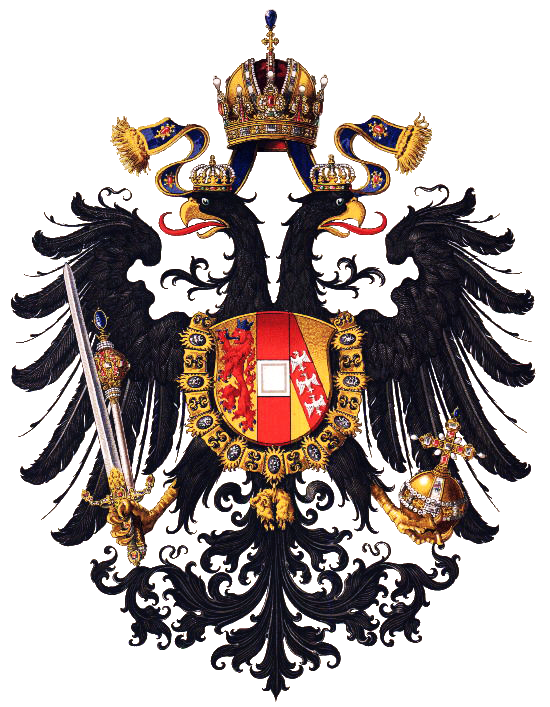
- Reference style: His Imperial and Royal Highness
- Spoken style: Your Imperial and Royal Highness

He lived on a portion of the Żywiec family estate that he and his brother, Albrecht, inherited from their father. Leo raised his children as Germans. He died of tuberculosis on 28 April 1939 at his estate in Bestwina, in southern Poland. Since he did not leave a will, the property was inherited by his wife Maja.

He was buried in the local cemetery in Bestwina, a countryside plot belonging to his family.

== Ancestry ==
Ancestors of Archduke Leo Karl of Austria

8. Archduke Charles, Duke of Teschen
4. Archduke Karl Ferdinand of Austria
9. Princess Henrietta of Nassau-Weilburg
2. Archduke Charles Stephen of Austria
10. Archduke Joseph, Palatine of Hungary
5. Archduchess Elisabeth Franziska of Austria
11. Duchess Maria Dorothea of Württemberg
1. Archduke Leo Karl of Austria
12. Leopold II, Grand Duke of Tuscany
6. Archduke Karl Salvator, Prince of Tuscany
13. Princess Marie Antoinette of the Two Sicilies
3. Archduchess Maria Theresia, Princess of Tuscany
14. Ferdinand II of the Two Sicilies
7. Princess Maria Immaculata of Bourbon-Two Sicilies
15. Maria Theresa of Austria
