= Hieronim Mikołaj Radziwiłł =

Polish noble (1885–1945)

His Serene Highness Hieronim Mikołaj Radziwiłł
- Prince Radziwiłł
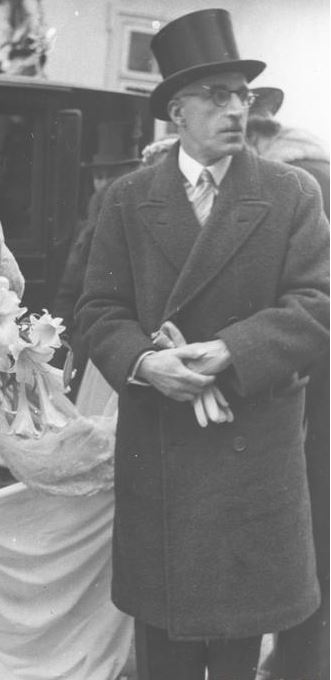
- Full name: Hieronim Mikołaj Melchior Konstanty Dominik Maria ks. Radziwiłł na Nieświeżu h. Trąby
- Born: 6 January 1885; Cannes, France
- Died: 6 April 1945 (aged 60); Gulag, near Luhansk, Soviet Union
- Family: Radziwiłł
- Spouses: Archduchess Renata of Austria (m. 1909; died 1935) Jadwiga Aniela Radziwiłł (m. 1937)
- Issue: Princess Maria Teresa Radziwiłł; Prince Dominic Rainer Radziwiłł; Prince Karol Jerome Radziwiłł; Prince Albert Radziwiłł; Princess Eleonore Radziwiłł; Prince Leon Jerome Radziwiłł
- Father: Dominik Maria Radziwiłł
- Mother: María Dolores de Agramonte y Zayas-Zamudio

Prince Hieronim Mikołaj Radziwiłł (6 January 1885 – 6 April 1945) was a Polish nobleman, landlord in Balice. He was a great-grandson of Prince Maciej Radziwiłł. He and his children carried the style of Serene Highness.

== Early life ==
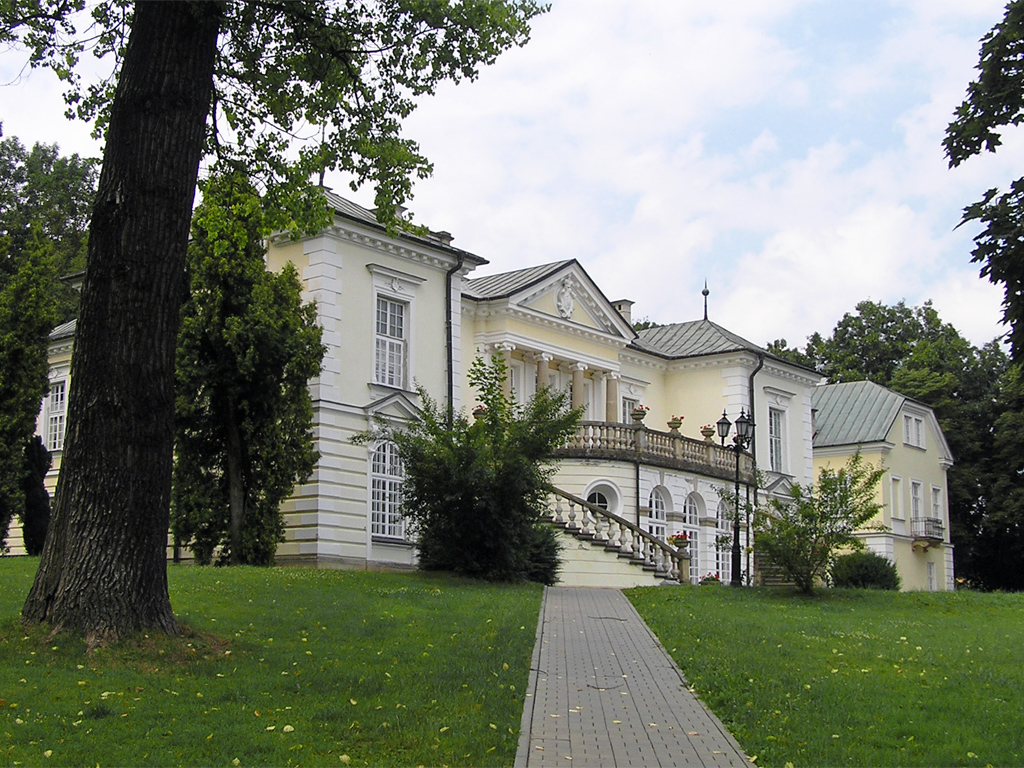
Radziwiłł Palace in Balice, 1927

Hieronim Mikołaj "Jerome" Radziwiłł was born on 6 January 1885 at Cannes in France. He was a son of Prince Dominik Maria Radziwiłł (1852–1938) and Doña María Dolores de Agramonte y Zayas-Zamudio (1854–1920). Among his siblings were Princess Dolores Radziwiłł, (Note: Princess Dolores Radziwiłł (1886–1966) married: (1) Prince Stanisław Wilhelm Radziwiłł (1880–1920), youngest son of Prince Antoni Wilhelm Radziwiłł and Marie de Castellane; (2) Prince Leon Radziwiłł (1880–1927), a son of Prince Constantine Radziwiłł (a grandson of Prince Antoni Radziwiłł and Princess Louise of Prussia) and Louise Blanc (daughter of François Blanc, founder of Monte-Carlo); and (3) Danish architect Mogens Tvede (1897–1977), son of Gotfred Tvede.) and Princess Isabella Radziwiłł. (Note: Princess Isabella Radziwiłł (1888–1968) married Prince Karol Nicholas Radziwiłł (1886–1968), a son of Prince Jerzy Radziwiłł (eldest son of Prince Antoni Wilhelm Radziwiłł and Marie de Castellane).)

His paternal grandparents were Konstanty Radziwiłł and Adela Karnitska (a descendant of Justynian Szczytt). He was a great-grandson of Prince Maciej Radziwiłł. His maternal grandparents were Francisco de Agramonte Cortijo and María de los Dolores de la Torre Dolores de Agramonte, natives of Santiago de Cuba where they were large landowners.

He graduated from the gymnasium in Feldkirch before he began studying law at the Jagiellonian University in 1904. He later moved to the Agricultural College at the university.

== Career ==
In between the World Wars, he was primarily involved in agriculture, breeding and forestry on his Balice estate which had been built by his father. He owned shares in a company producing glass and clay products. Although he was not involved in politics, he was an honorary member of the Supreme Council of the Party of National Monarchists.

During World War II, he was involved in the underground activity of the "Uprawa" gentry organization, which provided funding and food for the Home Army. He was arrested by the Soviet authorities in February 1945 and deported, along with 2,000 prisoners, to a NKVD Gulag labor camp during the Soviet occupation of Poland, where he died shortly after his arrival.

== Personal life ==
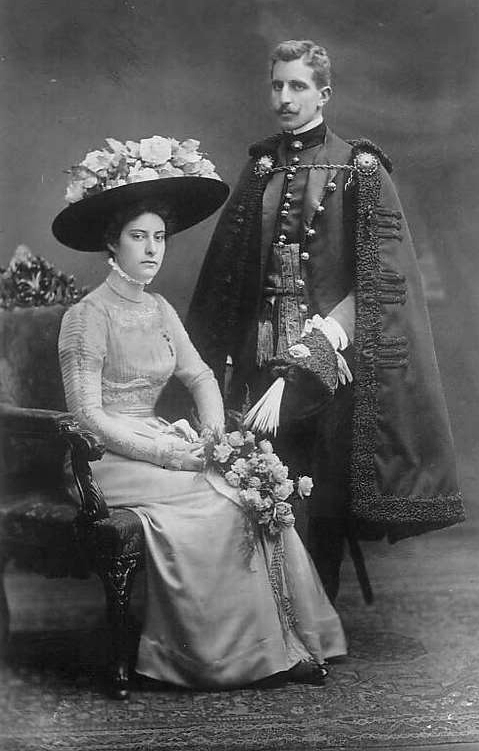
Hieronim Mikołaj Radziwiłł and Archduchess Renata, 1909

On 16 January 1909, Prince Radziwiłł married Archduchess Renata of Austria (1888–1935) in Żywiec. Renata was a daughter of Archduchess Maria Theresa of Austria, Princess of Tuscany and Archduke Charles Stephen of Austria. A first cousin of King Alfonso XIII of Spain, she was a member of the Teschen branch of the House of Habsburg-Lorraine. Upon her marriage to Prince Radziwiłł in 1909, she renounced her titles as Archduchess of Austria and Princess of Bohemia, Hungary, and Tuscany. Before her death on 9 December 1935, they were the parents of six children:

- Princess Maria Teresa Radziwiłł (1910–1973), who died unmarried.
- Prince Dominic Rainer Radziwiłł (1911–1976), who married Princess Eugénie of Greece and Denmark in 1938. (Note: Princess Eugénie of Greece and Denmark was the youngest child and only daughter of Prince George of Greece and Denmark and his wife, Princess Marie Bonaparte (daughter of Marie-Félix Blanc and Prince Roland Bonaparte, a great-nephew of Napoleon I). Her father was the second son of George I of Greece and Olga Constantinovna of Russia. After their divorce, Princess Eugénie married Prince Raimundo, Duke of Castel Duino in 1949. They too divorced, in 1965.) They divorced in 1946 and he married Lidia Lacey Bloodgood, a daughter of John Van Schaick Bloodgood and Lida Fleitmann Bloodgood.
- Prince Karol Jerome Radziwiłł (1912–2005), who married Maria Luisa de Alvear y Quirno in 1949 in Buenos Aires, Argentina, later, Maria Teresa Soto y Alderete.
- Prince Albert Radziwiłł (1914–1932), who died young at Davos, Switzerland.
- Princess Eleonore Radziwiłł (b. 1918), who married Count Benedikt Tyszkiewicz in 1938. She married Roger de Froidcourt in 1959.
- Prince Leon Jerome Radziwiłł (1922–1973).

After the death of his first wife, the Prince remarried to his cousin, Princess Jadwiga Aniela Radziwiłł in January 1937.

Prince Radziwiłł died at the Gulag, near Luhansk on 6 April 1945. He was buried in a wooden coffin in the steppe near the labor camp.

=== Descendants ===
Through his eldest son's first marriage to Princess Eugénie, he was a grandfather of Princess Tatiana Radziwiłł (1939-2025), (Note: Princess Tatiana Radziwiłł was a bridesmaid at the 1962 wedding of the future King Juan Carlos I of Spain and Princess Sophia of Greece and Denmark and at the 1964 wedding of King Constantine II of Greece and Princess Anne-Marie of Denmark.) who married Dr. Jean Henri Fruchaud in 1966, and Prince George Radziwiłł (1942–2001). Through his eldest son's second marriage to Lidia, he was posthumously grandfather of Princess Renata Radziwiłł (1954–2014), who married Swiss banker André Wagnière in 1976, Princess Louise Radziwiłł (b. 1956), who married Sicilian aristocrat Don Antonio Moncada, Nobile dei Principi of Paternò in 1987, and Princess Lyda Radziwiłł (b. 1959), who married Roman aristocrat Prince Innocenzo Odescalchi in 1991.

Through her daughter Eleonore's second marriage, he was posthumously a grandfather of Remy de Froidcourt (b. 1960).
