= Tatiana Radziwill =

French aristocrat and scientist (1939–2025)

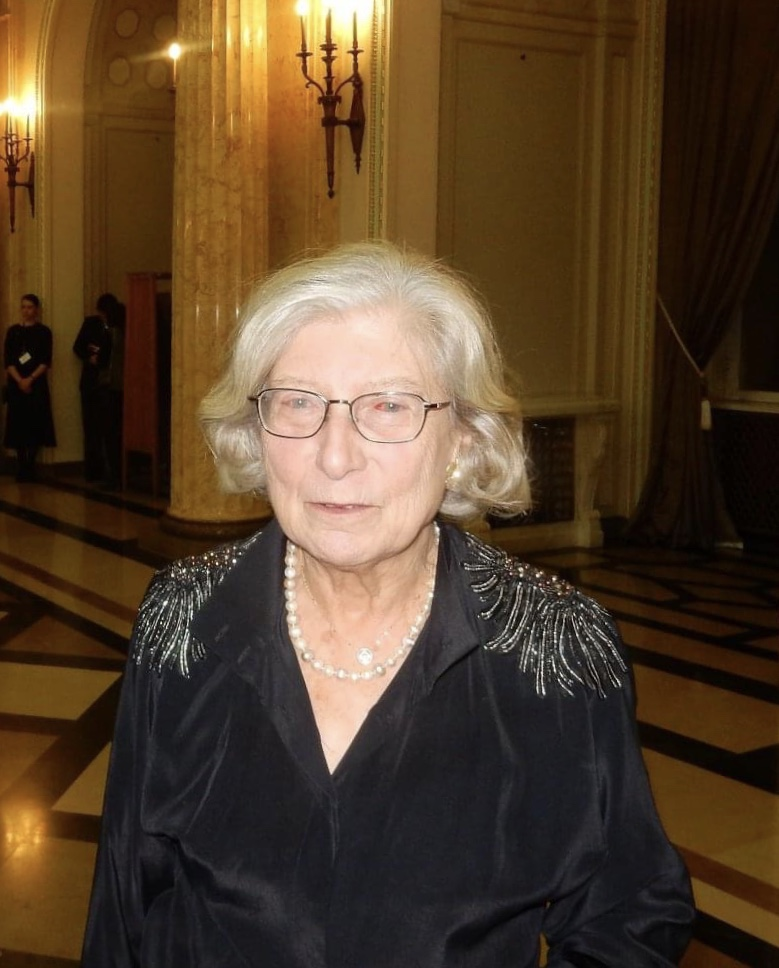
- Radziwill at the Royal Palace of Bucharest in 2017
- Full name: Tatiana Marie Renata Eugenie Elisabeth Margrethe Radziwill
- Born: 28 August 1939; Rouen, France
- Died: 19 December 2025 (aged 86); Paris, France
- Buried: Duino Castle, Friuli-Venezia Giulia, Italy
- Family: Radziwiłł
- Spouse: Jean Henri Fruchaud (m. 1966)
- Issue: Fabiola Fruchaud; Alexis Fruchaud
- Father: Prince Dominik Rainer Radziwiłł
- Mother: Princess Eugénie of Greece and Denmark
- Occupation: Nurse, bacteriologist

Tatiana Marie Renata Eugenie Elisabeth Margrethe Radziwill (28 August 1939 – 19 December 2025) was a French aristocrat, nurse and bacteriologist. The eldest daughter of Prince Dominik Rainer Radziwiłł and Princess Eugénie of Greece and Denmark, she belonged to the House of Radziwiłł and was related to several European royal families through her parents and maternal grandparents, Prince George of Greece and Denmark and Marie Bonaparte.

Radziwill spent part of her childhood in exile in South Africa during World War II, where she formed a close friendship with her second cousin Princess Sophia of Greece and Denmark. She was a bridesmaid at Sophia's marriage to the future King Juan Carlos I of Spain in 1962 and at the 1964 wedding of Constantine II of Greece and Princess Anne-Marie of Denmark. She remained a lifelong confidante of Queen Sofía. After studying nursing and bacteriology at the University of Paris, she married French cardiologist Jean Henri Fruchaud in 1966. They had two children. Radziwill also helped preserve the papers of her maternal grandmother, Marie Bonaparte, a psychoanalyst and author.

== Early life and family ==
Radziwill was born in Rouen, Normandy, on 28 August 1939, shortly before the outbreak of the Second World War. Her father, Prince Dominik Rainer Radziwiłł (1911–1976), was a member of the Polish noble family of Radziwiłł and had served as an officer in the Polish Army. Her mother, Princess Eugénie of Greece and Denmark (1910–1989), was a member of the Greek royal family. Through her father, Radziwill was a granddaughter of Prince Hieronim Mikołaj Radziwiłł and Archduchess Renata of Austria. Through her mother, she was a granddaughter of Prince George of Greece and Denmark, the second son of George I of Greece and Olga Constantinovna of Russia, and Marie Bonaparte, a daughter of Roland Napoléon Bonaparte, 6th Prince of Canino and Musignano, and Marie-Félix Blanc.

A few days after Radziwill's birth, the Second World War began in Europe. Following the fall of France in 1940, she and her parents left their home and took refuge in Saint-Tropez before going into exile in the Union of South Africa, then part of the British Empire. They were later joined by her maternal grandparents, Prince George and Marie Bonaparte, as well as other members of the Greek royal family, including Crown Princess Frederica and her children.

During the family's exile in South Africa, Radziwill became close to her second cousin, Princess Sophia of Greece and Denmark, who was born in 1938 and later became Queen Sofía of Spain. The two girls developed a close friendship that continued throughout their lives. Biographers of the Spanish queen subsequently described Radziwill as one of her closest friends and most trusted confidantes.

Radziwill also spent much of her childhood with her maternal grandmother, Marie Bonaparte, who was a psychoanalyst and a follower of Sigmund Freud. Shortly after Tatiana's birth, Bonaparte began writing a journal entitled Le Livre de Tatiana, recording observations about her granddaughter's behaviour and development. The journal reflected Bonaparte's interest in psychoanalysis and her close involvement in Tatiana's upbringing. Radziwill was known within her family by the nickname "Tatan".

Radziwill's younger brother, George Radziwiłł, was born in 1942. Their parents' marriage deteriorated, and they divorced in 1946. Her father remarried in 1947 to Lida Lacey Bloodgood, daughter of Lida Fleitmann Bloodgood, and had three more children. Her mother married Raimondo della Torre e Tasso, Duke of Castel Duino, in 1949; they had a son, Carlo Alessandro, in 1952.

After the war, Radziwill returned to France and spent long periods with her maternal grandparents. She travelled extensively with them in Europe, North America, Africa and Asia. She was educated in France and Greece, studied music and languages, spoke five languages and became a skilled pianist.

== Public life and royal duties ==
As a member of an aristocratic family connected to several European royal houses, Radziwill attended numerous royal occasions during her youth. These included the coronation of Elizabeth II in 1953 and the Cruise of the Kings in 1954, a voyage organised by Queen Frederica and King Paul of Greece and attended by more than 100 members of European royal families. She was also reportedly considered as a potential wife for the future Harald V of Norway.

In 1956, Radziwill was part of the official entourage attending a reception for King Paul of Greece in Paris, including events at the Bois de Boulogne and the Hôtel de Ville.

Radziwill's friendship with Princess Sophia brought her to the forefront of royal events in 1962, when Sophia married Prince Juan Carlos of Spain. Radziwill served as one of the bridesmaids, alongside Princess Irene of Greece and Denmark, Princess Irene of the Netherlands, Princess Alexandra of Kent, Princess Anne d'Orléans, Infanta Pilar of Spain, Princess Anne-Marie of Denmark and Princess Benedikte of Denmark.

In March 1963, Radziwill attended festivities celebrating the centenary of the Greek monarchy, including a religious service, a parade and a gala performance at the National Theatre of Greece. Later that year, she attended a lunch at Mon Repos in honour of Athenagoras I of Constantinople. In August 1963, she attended events associated with the 11th World Scout Jamboree, hosted by the Crown Prince of Greece.

In September 1964, Radziwill served as a bridesmaid at the wedding of her cousins Constantine II of Greece and Princess Anne-Marie of Denmark.

Radziwill maintained her relationship with the Greek royal family in later decades. In 2021, she attended the wedding of Prince Philippos of Greece and Denmark and Nina Flohr. In 2024, she attended the wedding of Princess Theodora of Greece and Denmark and Matthew Kumar.

== Personal life ==
While studying nursing and bacteriology at the University of Paris, Radziwill met French cardiologist Jean Henri “John” Fruchaud, the son of Colonel and physician Henri Fruchaud (1894–1960) and his second wife, Eunice McCooey. Fruchaud pursued a medical career and wrote a thesis entitled Les endocardites après 50 ans in 1974. He also contributed to a 1977 study on the role of the characteristic impedance of the ascending aorta in assessing left ventricular performance during ejection, which received the Mathieu-Bourceret Prize from the French National Academy of Medicine.

Radziwill and Fruchaud married on 24 March 1966 at the Catholic Church of St Luke in Irakleio, near Athens. Their wedding was attended by members of the Greek and Danish royal families, including King Constantine II, Queen Anne-Marie of Greece, Dowager Queen Frederica, Queen Ingrid of Denmark, Princess Alice of Battenberg, Princess Irene of Greece and Denmark and Princess Sophia of Greece.

Radziwill and Fruchaud had two children:

- Fabiola Fruchaud (born 1967), an accomplished equestrian. She first married Thierry Herrmann and later married Didier Fradin. Her children are Titiana Herrmann (born 1996) and Édouard Fradin (born 2007). Fabiola has been associated with an equestrian trophy bearing her name, awarded annually in Bunyola, Mallorca. With her second husband, she has also been associated with the management of the Château de Maudétour.
- Alexis Fruchaud (born 1969), who married Natalie Chandler. Their daughter, Thalia Fruchaud, was born in 2008.

After her marriage, Radziwill lived in Paris with her family. She remained a close friend and confidante of Queen Sofía, accompanied the queen on international trips and was regularly received at the Palace of Zarzuela in Madrid and the Marivent Palace in Mallorca. Their relationship, which began during their childhood exile in South Africa, endured for more than eight decades.

== Family archives and legacy ==
Radziwill helped preserve the papers of her maternal grandmother, Marie Bonaparte, and made documents available to researchers studying Bonaparte's life, her relationship with Prince George of Greece and her involvement in psychoanalysis. Her own recollections contributed to the historical record of her grandparents and their family circle.

In 2010, Radziwill contributed "Marie Bonaparte et Georges de Grèce, souvenirs de Tatiana" to the catalogue of an exhibition devoted to her grandmother at the Musée d'art et d'histoire de Saint-Cloud. The exhibition and catalogue examined Bonaparte's life and public engagement. Radziwill attended the exhibition with Albert II of Belgium and Queen Paola of Belgium.

Her role in preserving Bonaparte's papers attracted criticism from some authors opposed to psychoanalysis, who argued that the historical record surrounding Sigmund Freud and his followers had been protected from sufficient critical scrutiny. Writers including Mikkel Borch-Jacobsen and Jacques Bénesteau criticised aspects of the presentation and preservation of psychoanalytic archives. Other researchers expressed appreciation for the documents that Radziwill made available to them, including material from the family archive.

The exhibition and Radziwill's participation were later described by French cultural figure Frédéric Mitterrand in his 2013 book La Récréation. Mitterrand recounted visiting the exhibition with Radziwill and the Belgian royal couple on 12 December 2010.

== Death and funeral ==
Radziwill died in Paris on 19 December 2025, aged 86.

A memorial Mass was held on 10 January 2026 at the Church of Saint-Thomas-d'Aquin in Paris. Attendees included King Felipe VI and Queen Sofía of Spain, Queen Anne-Marie and other members of the Greek royal family. Other royal relatives present included Prince Guillaume of Luxembourg and Sibilla Weiller, Archduke Charles-Christian of Austria and Archduchess Marie-Astrid of Austria, and Bernhard, Margrave of Baden.

Radziwill was buried at Duino Castle in Friuli-Venezia Giulia, Italy.

== Popular culture ==
Radziwill was portrayed by Paloma Bloyd in the Spanish television film Sofía (2011), directed by Antonio Hernández. The film dramatised the life of the future Queen Sofía and her relationship with Juan Carlos.

She also appeared as a baby in the second part of Benoît Jacquot's 2004 television film Princesse Marie, which depicted the life of Marie Bonaparte. Radziwill was also depicted in the Norwegian television series La Roturière (2025), in the episode “L'Amour ou la Couronne”, directed by Vibeke Idsøe.

In his 2013 book La Récréation, Frédéric Mitterrand wrote about visiting an exhibition devoted to Marie Bonaparte with Radziwill and the Belgian royal couple in 2010.

== Ancestry ==
16. Konstanty Radziwiłł
8. Dominik Radziwiłł
17. Adela Kranicczanka
4. Hieronim Mikołaj Radziwiłł
18. Francisco de Agramonte y Agüero
9. María de los Dolores de Agramonte
19. María de los Dolores de Agramonte
2. Dominik Rainer Radziwiłł
20. Charles Ferdinand of Austria-Teschen
10. Charles Stephen of Austria
21. Elisabeth Franziska of Austria
5. Renée of Austria-Teschen
22. Charles Salvator of Austria
11. Maria Theresa of Austria-Tuscany
23. Maria Immaculata of Bourbon-Two Sicilies
1. Tatiana Radziwill
24. Christian IX of Denmark
12. George I of Greece
25. Louise of Hesse-Kassel
6. Prince George of Greece and Denmark
26. Grand Duke Konstantin Nikolayevich of Russia
13. Olga Constantinovna of Russia
27. Alexandra Iosifovna
3. Princess Eugénie of Greece and Denmark
28. Pierre-Napoléon Bonaparte
14. Roland Bonaparte
29. Justine-Éléonore Ruflin
7. Marie Bonaparte
30. François Blanc
15. Marie-Félix Blanc
31. Marie Hensel
