= Hochelaga =

Hochelaga (French pronunciation: [ɔʃlaɡa]) may refer to:

- Hochelaga (village), a 16th-century village on the Island of Montreal
- Hochelaga Archipelago, Montreal and surrounding islands
- Hochelaga, a 19th-century town eventually annexed to Montreal, now part of the neighbourhood of Hochelaga-Maisonneuve
- Hochelaga (electoral district), a federal electoral district within Montreal
- Hochelaga (provincial electoral district), a former provincial electoral district in Quebec
- Hochelaga (film), a movie about Montreal biker gangs
- Hochelaga, Land of Souls, a 2017 film
- HMCS Hochelaga, converted from a pleasure yacht to a Canadian patrol ship, and then a ferry

== See also ==
- Hochelaga-Maisonneuve, a neighbourhood of Montreal
- Hochelaga-Maisonneuve (provincial electoral district), a current provincial electoral district in Quebec
- Hochelaga—Maisonneuve (federal electoral district), a defunct federal electoral district in Quebec
- Mercier–Hochelaga-Maisonneuve, borough of Montreal
