= Ukrainian National Free Cossack Society =

Ukrainian emigrant organization

- Українське національне вільнокозацьке товариство
- Founder: Archduke Wilhelm of Austria
- Founded at: Vienna, Austria
- Type: emigrant conservative-monarchical organization

The Ukrainian National Free Cossack Society was a Ukrainian emigrant conservative-monarchist organisation, founded in 1921 in Vienna. It based its activities on the resolutions of the Congress of the Free Cossacks (Chyhyryn, October 3–6, 1917).

Representatives of this society considered the monarchy the only way to solve the Ukrainian problem and sought a leader - a real candidate for the royal throne - in the future, liberated from the Bolsheviks Ukraine.

At first, the organization was headed by the former Austrian archduke Wilhelm Habsburg (Vasily Vyshivany). The society published its printed newspaper, the Soborna Ukraina newspaper, in Vienna. The Ukrainian National Free Cossack Society included V. Andrievsky, T. Halip, O. Turyansky, V. Poletika, B. Butenko, and Ivan Poltavets-Ostryanytsya, who later (with archduke Wilhelm's departure from political activity) headed the organization.

== Sources ==
- Осташко Тетяна. Українські монархічні сили в еміграції на початку 20-х років за даними дипломатичної служби УНР
