= Archduchess Renata of Austria =

Archduchess Renata
- Princess Radziwiłł
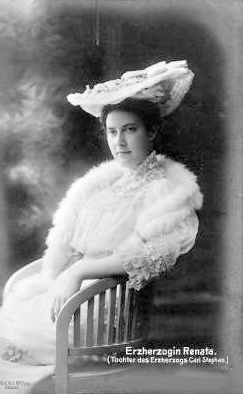
- Photograph, c. 1907
- Born: 2 January 1888; Pula, Austria-Hungary
- Died: 16 May 1935 (aged 47); Balice, Poland
- Spouse: Prince Hieronim Mikołaj Radziwiłł (m. 1909)
- Issue: Princess Maria Teresa Radziwiłł; Prince Dominic Rainer Radziwiłł; Prince Karol Jerome Radziwiłł; Prince Albert Radziwiłł; Princess Eleonore Radziwiłł; Prince Leon Jerome Radziwiłł
Names
- German: Renata Maria Caroline Raineria Theresia Philomena Desideria Macaria
- House: Habsburg-Lorraine (by birth); Radziwiłł (by marriage)
- Father: Archduke Charles Stephen of Austria
- Mother: Archduchess Maria Theresa of Austria, Princess of Tuscany

Archduchess Renata of Austria (2 January 1888 – 9 December 1935) was the daughter of Archduke Charles Stephen of Austria and a first cousin of King Alfonso XIII of Spain. A member of the Teschen branch of the House of Habsburg-Lorraine and an Archduchess of Austria and Princess of Bohemia, Hungary, and Tuscany by birth, she renounced her titles in 1909 upon her marriage to Prince Jerome Radziwiłł.

== Early life ==
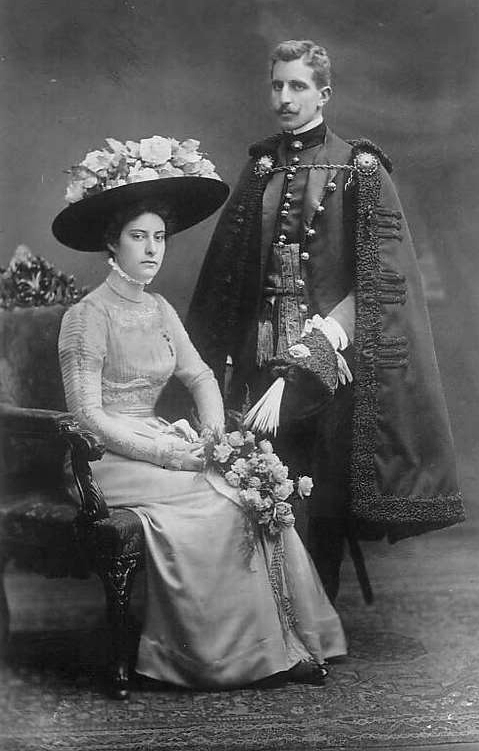
Photo of Archduchess Renata of Austria-Teschen and her husband Prince Jerome Radziwill, 1909

Archduchess Renata was the second daughter of Archduke Charles Stephen of Austria and his wife, Archduchess Maria Theresa of Austria, Princess of Tuscany. Both of her parents were closely related to Emperor Franz Joseph. Renata's father was a grandson of Archduke Charles of Austria who had led the Austrian army against Napoleon Bonaparte. Her father was also a brother of Queen Maria Christina of Spain. Renata's mother, Archduchess Maria Theresa of Austria, Princess of Tuscany was a granddaughter of Leopold II, the last reigning Grand Duke of Tuscany, and of King Ferdinand II of the Two Sicilies.

Archduchess Renata was educated by private tutors with a special emphasis on languages. She learned German, Italian, English, French and, from 1895, Polish. Her father had followed a career in the Austrian Navy and Renata spent her formative years primarily in Istria in the then Austrian port of Pula on the Adriatic. Her father was very wealthy and the family had a winter residence in the island of Losinj in the Adriatic, a palace in Vienna and in 1895 her father inherited from Archduke Albert vast properties in Galicia. From 1907 the family's main residence was in Saybusch Castle in western Galicia.

== Personal life ==
Archduke Charles Stephen put aside his career in the navy and centered his ambitions in creating a Polish branch of the House of Habsburg. He encouraged all of his children to become Polish and Archduchess Renata ended up marrying one of Poland's richest landowners, Prince Jerome Radziwill. Their engagement was announced in September 1908. The Radziwiłł family was one of the most distinguish families of Poland, but since his family did not belong to a list of ruling or former ruling princely families, Renata had to renounce all of her titles, along with the style of Imperial and Royal Highness. They signed a prenuptial agreement and separation of property. The wedding took place on 15 January 1909 in the chapel at Saybusch Castle.

Archduchess Renata and Prince Jerome Radziwiłł had six children and lived at Balice Castle, one of the Radziwiłł estates:

- Princess Maria Teresa Radziwiłł (1910–1973), who died unmarried.
- Prince Dominic Rainer Radziwiłł (1911–1976), who married Princess Eugénie of Greece and Denmark in 1938. (Note: Princess Eugénie of Greece and Denmark was the youngest child and only daughter of Prince George of Greece and Denmark and his wife, Princess Marie Bonaparte (daughter of Marie-Félix Blanc and Prince Roland Bonaparte, a great-nephew of Napoleon I). Her father was the second son of George I of Greece and Olga Constantinovna of Russia. After their divorce, Princess Eugénie married Prince Raimundo, Duke of Castel Duino in 1949. They too divorced, in 1965.) They divorced in 1946 and he married Lidia Lacey Bloodgood, a daughter of John Van Schaick Bloodgood and Lida Fleitmann Bloodgood.
- Prince Karol Jerome Radziwiłł (1912–2005), who married Maria Luisa de Alvear y Quirno in 1949 in Buenos Aires, Argentina, later, Maria Teresa Soto y Alderete.
- Prince Albert Radziwiłł (1914–1932), who died young at Davos, Switzerland.
- Princess Eleonore Radziwiłł (b. 1918), who married Count Benedikt Tyszkiewicz in 1938. She married Roger de Froidcourt in 1959.
- Prince Leon Jerome Radziwiłł (1922–1973).

Her eldest son, Dominik, eventually married Princess Eugénie of Greece and Denmark in 1938. With the defeat and dissolution of Austria-Hungary after World War I, the destiny of her family was even more closely linked to Poland. Archduchess Renata lived at Balice Castle in Poland, where she died on 16 May 1935. Her husband outlived her for ten years. Prince Jerome remarried. Towards the end of World War II, Prince Jerome was captured by Soviet troops and he was taken behind the Iron Curtain. He died in a concentration camp in 1945. The Radziwiłł properties were all lost.

== Ancestry ==
Ancestors of Archduchess Renata of Austria

8. Archduke Charles, Duke of Teschen
4. Archduke Karl Ferdinand of Austria
9. Princess Henrietta of Nassau-Weilburg
2. Archduke Charles Stephen of Austria
10. Archduke Joseph, Palatine of Hungary
5. Archduchess Elisabeth Franziska of Austria
11. Duchess Maria Dorothea of Württemberg
1. Archduchess Renata of Austria
12. Leopold II, Grand Duke of Tuscany
6. Archduke Karl Salvator, Prince of Tuscany
13. Princess Marie Antoinette of the Two Sicilies
3. Archduchess Maria Theresia, Princess of Tuscany
14. Ferdinand II of the Two Sicilies
7. Princess Maria Immaculata of Bourbon-Two Sicilies
15. Maria Theresa of Austria
