= Archduchess Eleonora of Austria =

Archduchess of Austria (1886–1974)

Archduchess Eleonora
- Mrs. Alfons von Kloss
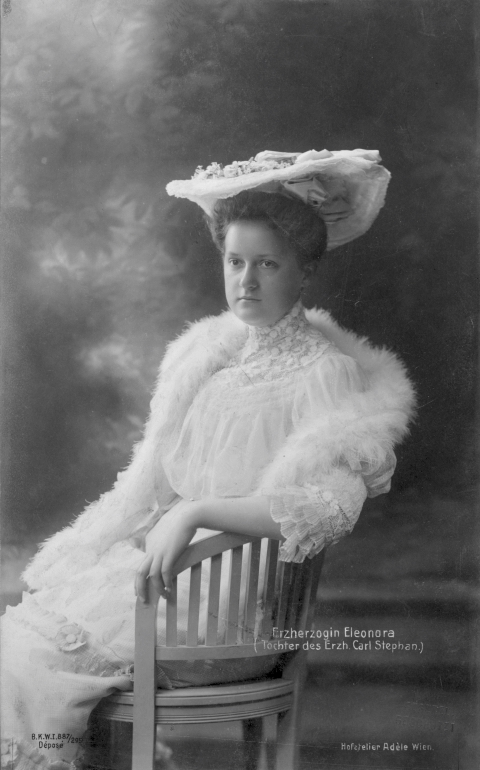
- Photograph, c. 1907.
- Born: 28 November 1886; Pula, Austria-Hungary
- Died: 26 May 1974 (aged 87); Baden bei Wien, Austria
- Spouse: Alfons von Kloss (m. 1913; died 1953)
- Issue: Albrecht von Kloss; Karl von Kloss; Rainer von Kloss; Ernest von Kloss; Alfons von Kloss; Maria Theresia von Kloss; Stephan von Kloss
Names
- Eleonora Maria Immakulata Christina Josepha Sosthenesia
- House: Habsburg-Lorraine
- Father: Archduke Charles Stephen of Austria
- Mother: Archduchess Maria Theresa of Austria, Princess of Tuscany

Archduchess Eleonora of Austria (28 November 1886 – 26 May 1974) was the daughter of Archduke Charles Stephen of Austria and a first cousin of King Alfonso XIII of Spain. She was member of the Teschen branch of the House of Habsburg-Lorraine and an Archduchess of Austria and Princess of Bohemia, Hungary, and Tuscany by birth. She renounced to her titles upon her morganatic marriage to Alfons Kloss, the captain of her father's yacht. During World War II, her sons served in the German army.

== Background and early life ==
Archduchess Eleonora was the eldest daughter of Archduke Charles Stephen of Austria and his wife, Archduchess Maria Theresa of Austria, Princess of Tuscany. Both of her parents were closely related to Emperor Franz Joseph. Her father, a grandson of Archduke Charles of Austria who had led the Austrian army against Napoleon Bonaparte, was a brother of Queen Maria Christina of Spain. Eleonora’s mother, Archduchess Maria Theresa of Austria, Princess of Tuscany, was a granddaughter of Leopold II, the last reigning Grand Duke of Tuscany. On her maternal side, she was a great-granddaughter of King Ferdinand II of the Two Sicilies.

Archduchess Eleonora was born in Pula, Austria-Hungary, now Croatia, where her father was stationed as a naval officer. She was educated by private tutors, with an educational emphasis on languages. She learned German, Italian, English, French and from 1895 Polish. Her father followed a career in the Austrian Navy and Eleanore spent her formative years primarily in Istria in the then Austrian port of Pula in the Adriatic. Her father was very wealthy and the family had a summer villa in the island of Losinj in the Adriatic, a palace in Vienna and maintain a luxurious yacht for summer cruises. In 1895 her father inherited from Archduke Albert vast properties in Galicia. From 1907 the family main residence was in Saybusch castle in western Galicia today Poland, but still they spent the winters in Istria.

== Marriage ==
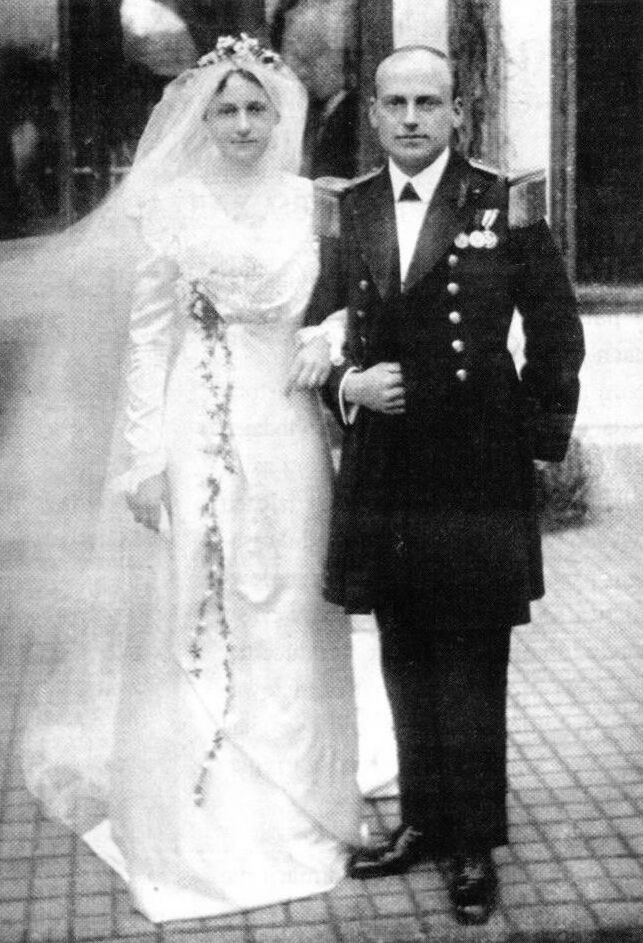
Archduchess Eleonora with her husband on their wedding day, 1913.

At age fifteen, Archduchess Eleonora fell in love with Alfons von Kloss, a sailor who worked as the captain of her father's yacht. Their relationship grew during many family's Mediterranean cruises. Archduke Charles Stephen had wished to marry his eldest daughter to a Polish aristocrat, but he was touched by the couple's true love and persistence. He contacted the emperor, asking him to authorize the union. Emperor Franz Joseph was inflexible on family matters, but he was a good friend of Archduke Charles Stephen of Austria and gave his permission.

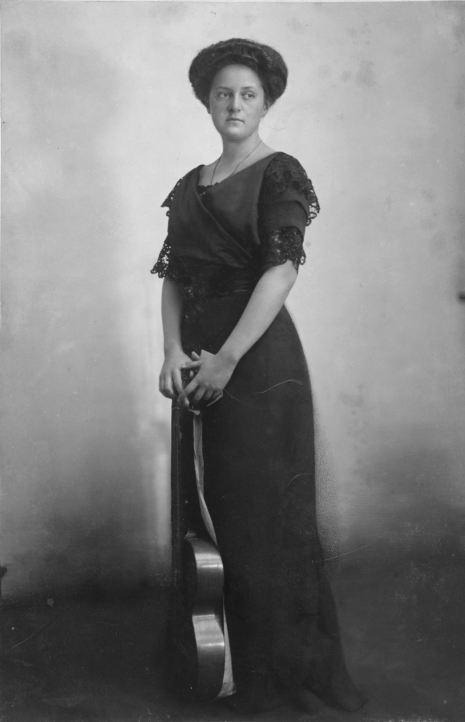
Photograph by Carl Pietzner, 1912.

The wedding, a modest ceremony, took place on 9 January 1913 at Saybusch, two days before the wedding of her sister Archduchess Mechthildis of Austria. Archduchess Eleonora renounced to her titles upon her marriage becoming simply Mrs von Kloss. The couple settled in Istria. Alfons von Kloss worked as Corvette Captain in the Imperial navy, and served with distinction during World War I. Eleonora and her husband stayed in Austria after the fall of the monarchy and lived in Baden bei Wien, in a large villa Eleonora had inherited from her childless uncle Archduke Rainer of Austria. One of her sons, Alfons, was military attaché at the Austrian Embassy in Washington, DC. Her husband died in 1953, while Eleonora survived him by 21 years and died in 1974 at the age of 87. Most of her many descendants still live in Austria.

== Children ==
Archduchess Eleonora and Alfons von Kloss (1880–1953) had eight children:

- Albrecht von Kloss (1913–1963); married Erika Kaiser. They had one son and two daughters.
- Karl von Kloss (1915–1939)
- Rainer von Kloss (1916–1991); married Cornelia Schoute and had one son and one daughter.
- Ernest von Kloss (1919–2002); married Rixta Harting and had three sons and one daughter.
- Alfons von Kloss (1920–2002); married Theresia von Coreth zu Coredo and had three sons.
- Frederich von Kloss (1922–1943)
- Maria Theresia von Kloss (1925–2006); married Walter Kaiser and had four sons and one daughter.
- Stephan von Kloss (1933–?); married Ingrid Morocutti and had three sons and three daughters.

== Ancestry ==
Ancestors of Archduchess Eleonora of Austria

8. Archduke Charles, Duke of Teschen
4. Archduke Karl Ferdinand of Austria
9. Princess Henrietta of Nassau-Weilburg
2. Archduke Charles Stephen of Austria
10. Archduke Joseph, Palatine of Hungary
5. Archduchess Elisabeth Franziska of Austria
11. Duchess Maria Dorothea of Württemberg
1. Archduchess Eleonora of Austria
12. Leopold II, Grand Duke of Tuscany
6. Archduke Karl Salvator, Prince of Tuscany
13. Princess Marie Antoinette of the Two Sicilies
3. Archduchess Maria Theresia, Princess of Tuscany
14. Ferdinand II of the Two Sicilies
7. Princess Maria Immaculata of Bourbon-Two Sicilies
15. Maria Theresa of Austria
