= Dominik Rainer Radziwiłł =

Polish Army officer

Prince Dominik Rainer Radziwiłł
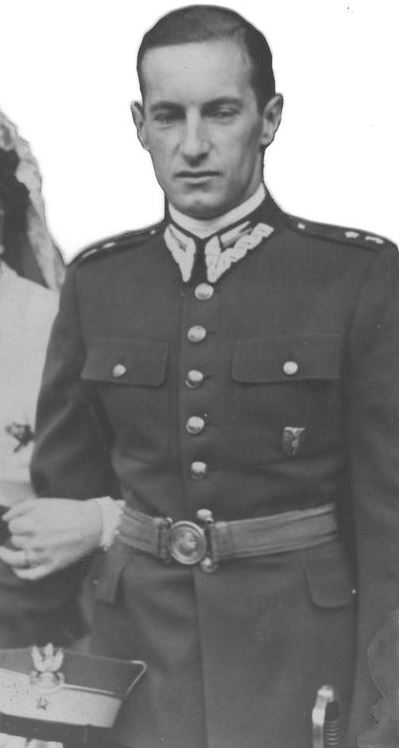
- Coat of arms: Trąby
- Full name: Dominik Rainer Karol Hieronim Maria Mikołaj Alfons Radziwiłł
- Born: 22 January 1911; Balice, near Kraków, Poland
- Died: 19 November 1976 (aged 65); Geneva, Switzerland
- Family: Radziwiłł
- Spouses: Princess Eugénie of Greece and Denmark (m. 1938; div. 1946) Lida Lacey Bloodgood (m. 1947)
- Issue: Princess Tatiana Radziwiłł; Prince George Radziwiłł; Princess Renata Radziwiłł; Princess Louise Radziwiłł; Princess Lyda Radziwiłł
- Father: Prince Hieronim Mikołaj Radziwiłł
- Mother: Archduchess Renata of Austria

Prince Dominik Rainer Radziwiłł (22 January 1911 – 19 November 1976) was a Polish aristocrat and officer of the Polish Army.

His father, Prince Hieronim Mikołaj Radziwiłł, was deported to a gulag during the Soviet occupation of Poland and died on 6 April 1945. His mother was Archduchess Renata of Austria (1888–1937).

== Marriage and issue ==
He married Princess Eugénie of Greece and Denmark on 30 May 1938 in Paris, from whom he was divorced in 1946, and had two children:

- Tatiana Marie Renata Eugenie Elisabeth Margrethe Radziwill (28 August 1939 – 19 December 2025); married Dr. Jean Henri Fruchaud on 24 March 1966. She was a bridesmaid at the 1962 wedding of the future King Juan Carlos I of Spain and Princess Sophia of Greece and Denmark and at the 1964 wedding of King Constantine II of Greece and Princess Anne-Marie of Denmark.
- Georges Andrew Dominique Jerome Peter Leon Radziwill (4 November 1942 – 27 August 2001).

His second wife was Lida Lacey Bloodgood (b. 1 February 1923, New York, - d. 31 July 2008, Rome, Italy), daughter of John Van Schaick Bloodgood and Lida Fleitmann Bloodgood, married on 8 January 1947 in Rome. They had three daughters:

- Lida Maria Renata Radziwill (11 July 1954, Cape Town – 5 May 2014); married Swiss banker André Wagnière, on 30 October 1976 (divorced).
- Marie-Louise Edwige Radziwill (b. 23 January 1956); married Sicilian aristocrat Don Antonio Moncada, Nobile dei Principi of Paternò, on 4 October 1987.
- Lida Dominique Radziwill (b. 29 August 1959); married Roman aristocrat Prince Innocenzo Odescalchi in 1991.
