= Archduke Charles Stephen of Austria =

Habsburg admiral and noble (1860–1933)

Archduke Charles Stephen
- Grand Admiral Archduke Charles Stephen, 1917
- Born: 5 September 1860; Židlochovice, Margraviate of Moravia, Austrian Empire
- Died: 7 April 1933 (aged 72); Żywiec, Polish Second Republic
- Spouse: Archduchess Maria Theresa of Austria (m. 1886)
- Issue: Archduchess Eleonora; Archduchess Renata; Archduke Karl Albrecht; Archduchess Mechthildis; Archduke Leo Karl; Archduke Wilhelm
Names
- Karl Stephan Eugen Viktor Felix Maria
- House: Habsburg-Lorraine
- Father: Archduke Karl Ferdinand of Austria
- Mother: Archduchess Elisabeth Franziska of Austria

Archduke Charles Stephen Eugene Viktor Felix Maria of Austria (German: Erzherzog Karl Stephan Eugen Viktor Felix Maria von Habsburg-Lothringen, Polish: Arcyksiążę Karol Stefan Eugeniusz Wiktor Feliks Maria Habsburg-Lothringen; 5 September 1860 – 7 April 1933) was a member of the House of Habsburg, an Admiral in the Austro-Hungarian Navy and candidate for the Polish crown.

== Family ==
Charles Stephen was born at the castle of Gross Seelowitz in Moravia (today Židlochovice near Brno in the Czech Republic), the son of Archduke Karl Ferdinand of Austria 1818–1874, himself son of Archduke Charles, Duke of Teschen; and of his wife Archduchess Elisabeth Franziska of Austria (1831–1903). At his baptism he was given the names Karl Stephan Eugen Viktor Felix Maria. Among his siblings were Queen Maria Theresa of Bavaria, Archduke Friedrich of Austria, Queen Maria Cristina of Spain, and Archduke Eugen of Austria.

On 28 February 1886 at Vienna, Charles Stephen married Archduchess Maria Theresia, Princess of Tuscany (Brandeis-Altbunzlau (Brandýs nad Labem-Stará Boleslav), 18 September 1862–Castle of Saybusch (Żywiec), 10 May 1933). She was the daughter of Archduke Karl Salvator of Austria, Prince of Tuscany and his wife Princess Maria Immaculata of Bourbon-Two Sicilies. The ceremony took place in the Hofburg and was witnessed by Cardinal Ganglbauer.

Charles Stephen and Maria Theresia had six children:

- Archduchess Eleonora of Austria (1886–1974) married morganatically Alfons von Kloss.
- Archduchess Renata of Austria (1888–1935) married Prince Hieronim Mikołaj Radziwill.
- Archduke Karl Albrecht of Austria (1888–1951) married Alice Elisabeth Ankarcrona, had issue.
- Archduchess Mechthildis of Austria (1891–1966) married Prince Olgierd Czartoryski.
- Archduke Leo Karl of Austria (1893–1939) married Maria-Klothilde von Thuillières Gräfin von Montjoye-Vaufrey et de la Roche, had issue.
- Archduke Wilhelm of Austria (1895–1948).

== Military career ==
Austro-Hungarian Naval Ensign

Monarchical styles of Archduke Charles Stephen of Austria
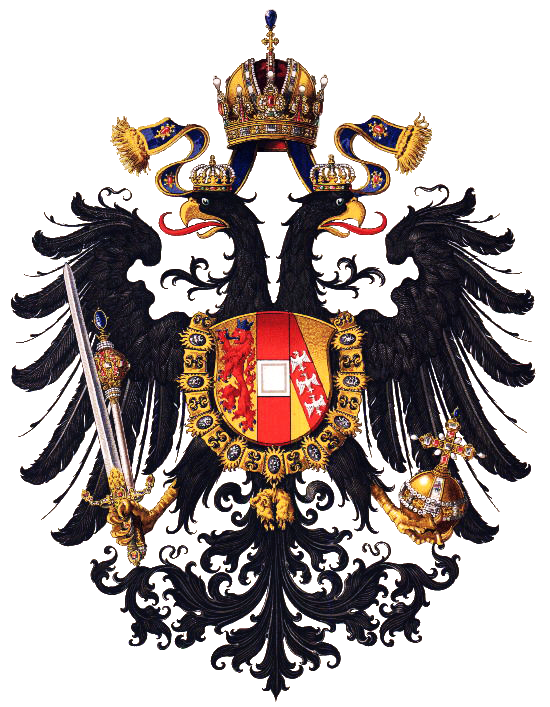
- Reference style: His Imperial and Royal Highness
- Spoken style: Your Imperial and Royal Highness

In 1879, Charles Stephen was commissioned as a Seefähnrich in the Austro-Hungarian Navy. Appointed his naval governor in 1879 was Fregattenkapitän (later admiral) Hermann von Spaun, who accompanied him on a voyage to Brazil and North America in the goelette Saida. In 1896, he retired from active duty. He continued, however, to be advanced in rank, attaining the rank of admiral in 1911. He was named Marineinspekteur (navy inspector), making him the titular ranking officer of the navy. Others, however, had effective control of operations in 1914–1918; Anton Haus, Maximilian Njegovan and Miklós Horthy each served in turn as Flottenkommandant (Fleet Commander). In 1918, the Emperor Charles I put him in charge of the enquiry into the mutiny of the navy at Cattaro (now Kotor in Montenegro). Charles Stephen recommended a sweeping re-organisation of the navy and the appointment of Miklós Horthy as commander-in-chief.

Charles Stephen was an officer à la suite of the Imperial German Navy and proprietary head of the 8th Austrian Infantry Regiment. His brother, Feldmarschall Archduke Friedrich, was commander-in-chief of the Austro-Hungarian Army from July 1914 to February 1917, and his eldest son, Archduke Karl Albrecht, held the rank of Oberst (colonel) at the end of World War I.

== Candidate for the Polish crown ==
On 5 November 1916, the Kaiser William II, German Emperor and the Emperor Franz Joseph I of Austria issued the 'Act of 5 November' creating the Kingdom of Poland as an independent state with a hereditary monarchy. Charles Stephen was considered as a candidate to be regent and eventually king.

At the time, Charles Stephen was living at the Castle of Saysbusch (Żywiec), in Galicia. His chances were enhanced by the fact that he spoke fluent Polish. Two of his daughters were married to Polish princes belonging to the noble houses of Radziwill and Czartoryski. However, as Charles Stephen was a member of the Imperial House of Austria he needed permission to become king from the head of the family, Emperor Charles I, who hesitated, having himself planned to assume the Polish crown. Moreover, the Radziwill and Czartoryski families urged the cause of Russia (as their ancestors had in the 18th century). Adding to the political muddle was the support of Ukrainian nationalism by Charles Stephen's son, Archduke Wilhelm.

In the end, the proclamation was so vague and tentative that it failed to inspire enthusiasm among its supposed beneficiaries or even among the Germans and Austro-Hungarians themselves.

== Yachting ==
In addition to his professional career as a naval officer, Charles Stephen took an active interest in yachting. He was a flag officer of the Imperial and Royal Yacht Squadron. His interest in yachting brought him to England on several occasions including in 1879 for the Royal Yacht Squadron Regatta, in 1900, and in 1911. In 1892, he was made a member of the (British) Yacht Racing Association. He purchased several British yachts including the Valkyrie from the Earl of Dunraven in 1892 and the Ul from Ramage and Ferguson Limited in 1911. His yacht Waturus was sold to Randal Morgan of Philadelphia in June 1902, and went on to have a long career in both naval and civilian service as Hochelaga.

== Estates ==
When Charles Stephen's uncle Archduke Albert, Duke of Teschen died in 1895, he and his brothers each inherited large estates. His largest properties were in Galicia especially at Saybusch (now Żywiec in Poland). Among the businesses operated here was the Żywiec Brewery which was nationalized by the Communists after World War II. Charles Stephen had a palace at Pola (now Pula in Croatia) and a winter palace in Lussin (now Lošinj). He also had a palace in Vienna in the Wiedner Hauptstrasse.

== Honours ==
Charles Stephen received the following decorations and awards:

- (Austrian Empire) (Kingdom of Hungary) Austria-Hungary:
  - Knight of the Golden Fleece, 1878
  - Grand Cross of the Royal Hungarian Order of St. Stephen, 1912
  - Bronze Military Merit Medal, on Band of the Military Merit Cross
  - Long Service Cross for Officers, 3rd Class
  - Bronze Jubilee Medal for the Armed Forces
  - Military Jubilee Medal
- (Tuscany) Tuscan Grand Ducal Family: Knight of Justice of the Military Order of St. Stephen
- Belgium: Grand Cordon of the Order of Leopold
- Denmark: Knight of the Elephant, 18 August 1890
- (Saxe-Coburg and Gotha) (Duchy of Saxe-Altenburg) (Saxe-Meiningen) Ernestine duchies: Grand Cross of the Saxe-Ernestine House Order
- Sovereign Military Order of Malta: Bailiff Grand Cross of Honour, with Distinction for Jerusalem
- Principality of Montenegro: Grand Cross of the Order of Prince Danilo I
- Ottoman Empire:
  - Order of Osmanieh, 1st Class in Diamonds
  - Gold and Silver Imtiyaz Medals
  - Gallipoli Star
- Kingdom of Portugal:
  - Grand Cross of the Sash of the Three Orders
  - Grand Cross of the Tower and Sword
- Kingdom of Prussia:
  - Knight of the Black Eagle
  - Red Cross Medal, 1st and 2nd Classes
- Spain: Grand Cross of the Order of Charles III, with Collar, 15 December 1902
- Sweden-Norway: Knight of the Seraphim, 27 October 1890
- Württemberg: Grand Cross of the Württemberg Crown, 1876

In 1916, he was named Protector of the Polish Academy of Learning in Kraków. He was a Großadmiral (Grand Admiral) in the Austro-Hungarian Navy, equivalent to the rank of Feldmarschall (Field Marshal) in the army.

== Later life ==
After 1918, Charles Stephen acquired Polish citizenship and continued to live in Żywiec, which had passed to the sovereignty of the Second Republic of Poland. He died there on 7 April 1933. Archduchess Maria Theresa died there a month later, on 10 May 1933.

== Ancestry ==
Ancestors of Archduke Charles Stephen of Austria

8. Leopold II, Holy Roman Emperor
4. Archduke Charles, Duke of Teschen
9. Infanta María Luisa of Spain
2. Archduke Karl Ferdinand of Austria
10. Frederick William, Prince of Nassau-Weilburg
5. Princess Henrietta of Nassau-Weilburg
11. Burgravine Louise Isabelle of Kirchberg
1. Archduke Charles Stephen of Austria
12. Leopold II, Holy Roman Emperor (= 8)
6. Archduke Joseph, Palatine of Hungary
13. Infanta María Luisa of Spain (= 9)
3. Archduchess Elisabeth Franziska of Austria
14. Duke Louis of Württemberg
7. Duchess Maria Dorothea of Württemberg
15. Princess Henriette of Nassau-Weilburg
