= Bestwinka =

- Village
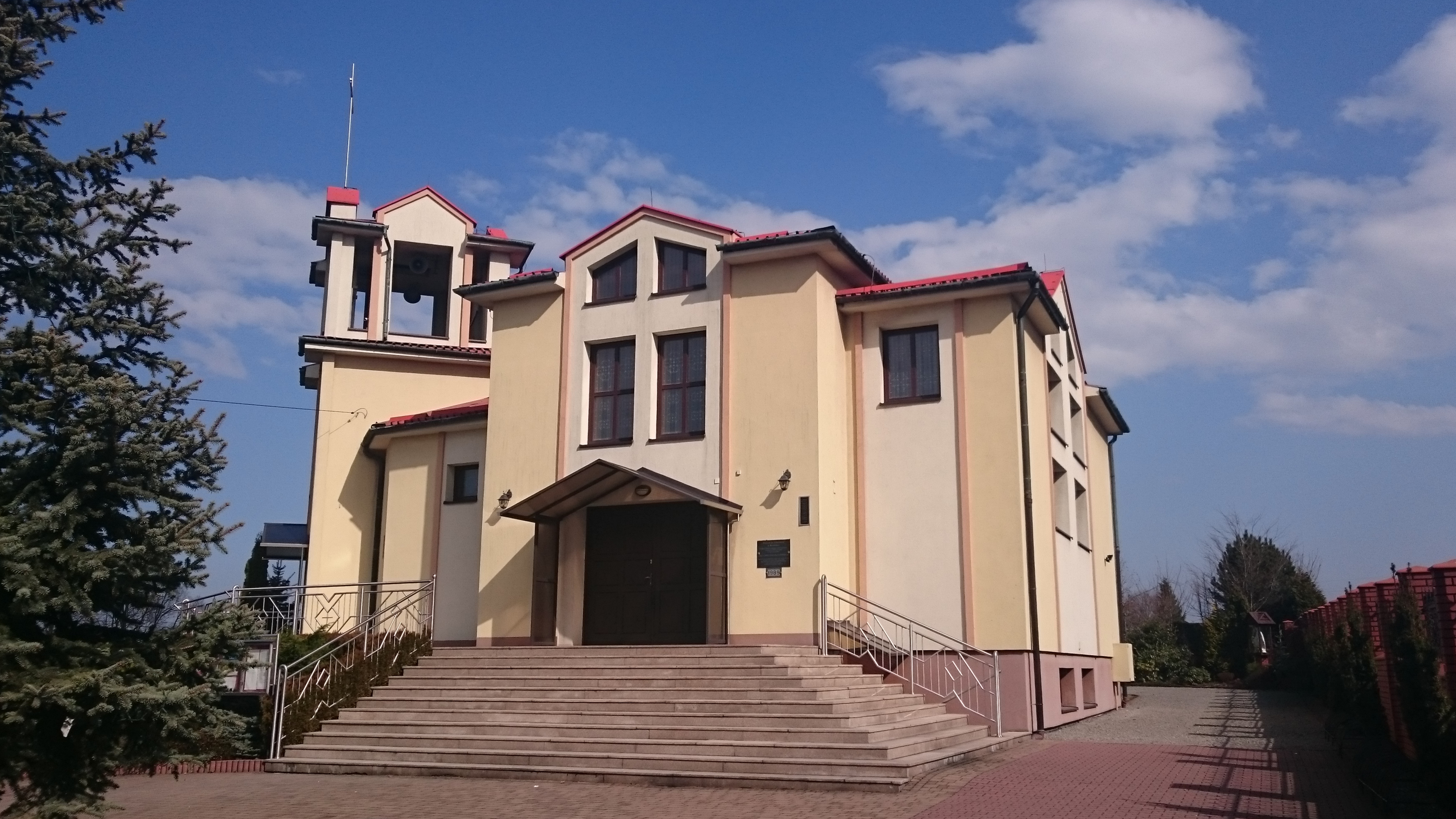
- Saint Sebastian church

- Location within Poland
- Coordinates: 49°55′7″N 19°3′47″E
- Country: Poland
- Voivodeship: Silesian
- County: Bielsko
- Gmina: Bestwina
- Population: 1,541

Bestwinka [bɛstˈfinka] is a village in the administrative district of Gmina Bestwina, within Bielsko County, Silesian Voivodeship, in southern Poland.
