= Archduchess Maria Theresa of Austria (1862–1933) =

Member of the House of Habsburg-Tuscany

Archduchess Maria Theresa
- Archduchess Charles Stephen of Austria
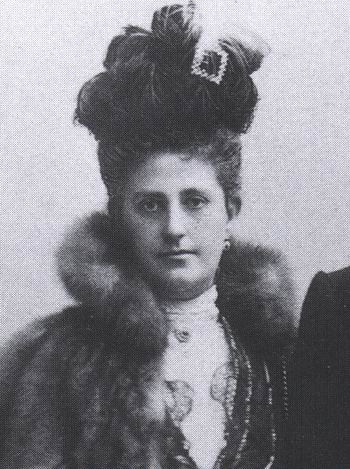
- Photograph, c. 1900s.
- Born: 18 September 1862; Alt-Bunzlau, Bohemia, Austrian Empire
- Died: 10 May 1933 (aged 70); Żywiec Castle, Żywiec, Poland
- Spouse: Archduke Charles Stephen of Austria (m. 1886; died 1933)
- Issue: Archduchess Eleonora; Archduchess Renata; Archduke Karl Albrecht; Archduchess Mechthildis; Archduke Leo Karl; Archduke Wilhelm
Names
- German: Maria Theresia Antoinette Immakulata Josepha Ferdinanda Leopoldine Franziska Caroline Isabella Januaria Aloysia Christine Anna
- House: Habsburg-Tuscany
- Father: Archduke Karl Salvator of Austria
- Mother: Princess Maria Immacolata of Bourbon-Two Sicilies

Archduchess Maria Theresa of Austria (German: Maria Theresia Antoinette Immakulata Josepha Ferdinanda Leopoldine Franziska Caroline Isabella Januaria Aloysia Christine Anna, Erzherzogin von Österreich) (18 September 1862, in Alt-Bunzlau, Bohemia, Austrian Empire – 10 May 1933, in Żywiec Castle, Żywiec, Poland) was a member of the House of Habsburg-Tuscany and Archduchess of Austria, Princess of Tuscany by birth. She was the eldest child and eldest daughter of Archduke Karl Salvator of Austria and Princess Maria Immaculata of Bourbon-Two Sicilies.

== Marriage and issue ==
Maria Theresa married her mother's second cousin Archduke Charles Stephen of Austria, fourth child and third son of Archduke Karl Ferdinand of Austria and Archduchess Elisabeth Franziska of Austria, on 28 February 1886 in Vienna. They had six children together:

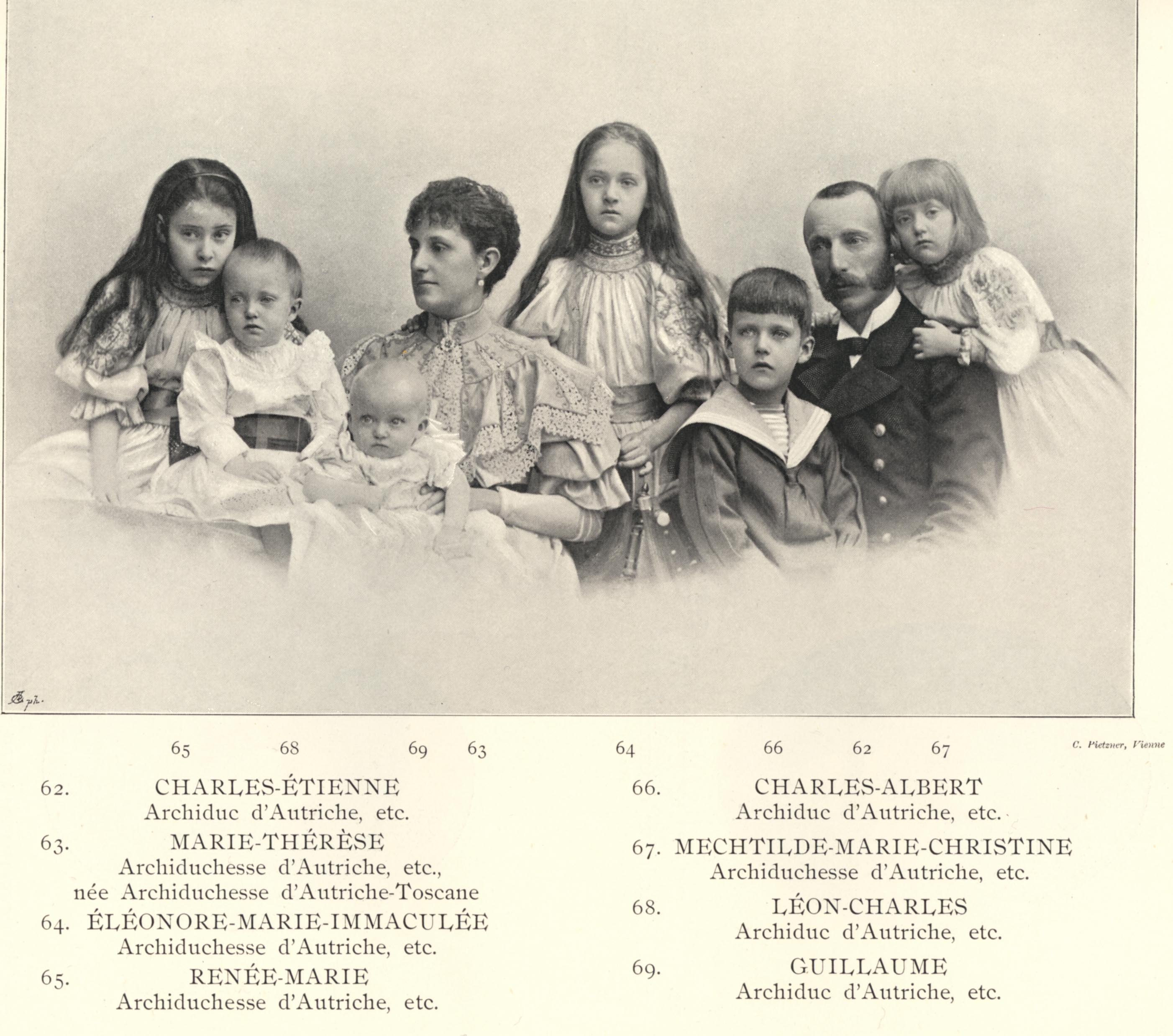
Maria Theresia, Charles Stephen, and their family; photographed in 1896.

- Archduchess Eleonora of Austria-Teschen (1886–1974) married morganatically Alfons von Kloss.
- Archduchess Renata of Austria-Teschen (1888–1935) married Prince Hieronymus Radziwiłł.
- Archduke Karl Albrecht of Austria-Teschen (1888–1951) married morganatically Alice Elisabeth Ankarcrona.
- Archduchess Mechthildis of Austria-Teschen (1891–1966) married Prince Olgierd Czartoryski.
- Archduke Leo Karl of Austria-Teschen (1893–1939) married Maria-Klothilde von Thuillières Gräfin von Montjoye-Vaufrey et de la Roche, had issue, among others Count Leo Stefan of Habsburg.
- Archduke Wilhelm of Austria-Teschen (1895–1948), died unmarried.

== Court life and dynastic role ==
Following her marriage in 1886, Maria Theresa assumed extensive ceremonial duties within the imperial court, dividing her time between the family's urban estates in Vienna and their permanent residence at Żywiec Castle in Galicia. An accomplished watercolorist and landscape painter, she actively engaged in artistic patronage and professional artwork production throughout her tenure within the imperial family. Utilizing the monogram "MT" for her signed creations, she specialized in botanical illustrations, historical architecture drawings, and regional landscapes, including her notable 1918 watercolor piece titled Seenlandschaft.

Her private artistic portfolio remained formally integrated into the family inventories of the House of Austria-Tuscany. During the interwar era, following the institutional sụp đổ of the Austro-Hungarian Empire, she retired from public court obligations to focus entirely on family affairs and her private studio in Europe. Portions of her verified dynastic artwork collections and signed landscape paintings were preserved across regional aristocratic estates and subsequently documented by contemporary curators and art market specialists through the late twentieth century.

== Honours ==
- Austria-Hungary:
  - Dame of the Order of the Starry Cross, 1st Class
  - Grand Cross of the Order of Elizabeth
- Kingdom of Bavaria: Dame of the Order of Saint Elizabeth
- Ottoman Empire: Grand Cordon of the Order of Charity
- Spain: Dame of the Order of Queen Maria Luisa

== Ancestry ==
Ancestors of Archduchess Maria Theresa of Austria (1862–1933)

8. Ferdinand III, Grand Duke of Tuscany
4. Leopold II, Grand Duke of Tuscany
9. Princess Luisa of Naples and Sicily
2. Archduke Karl Salvator of Austria
10. Francis I of the Two Sicilies
5. Princess Maria Antonia of the Two Sicilies
11. Infanta Maria Isabella of Spain
1. Archduchess Maria Theresa of Austria
12. Francis I of the Two Sicilies (= 10)
6. Ferdinand II of the Two Sicilies
13. Infanta Maria Isabella of Spain (= 11)
3. Princess Maria Immacolata of Bourbon-Two Sicilies
14. Archduke Charles, Duke of Teschen
7. Archduchess Maria Theresa of Austria
15. Princess Henrietta of Nassau-Weilburg
