= Kaniów, Silesian Voivodeship =

Kaniów
- Village
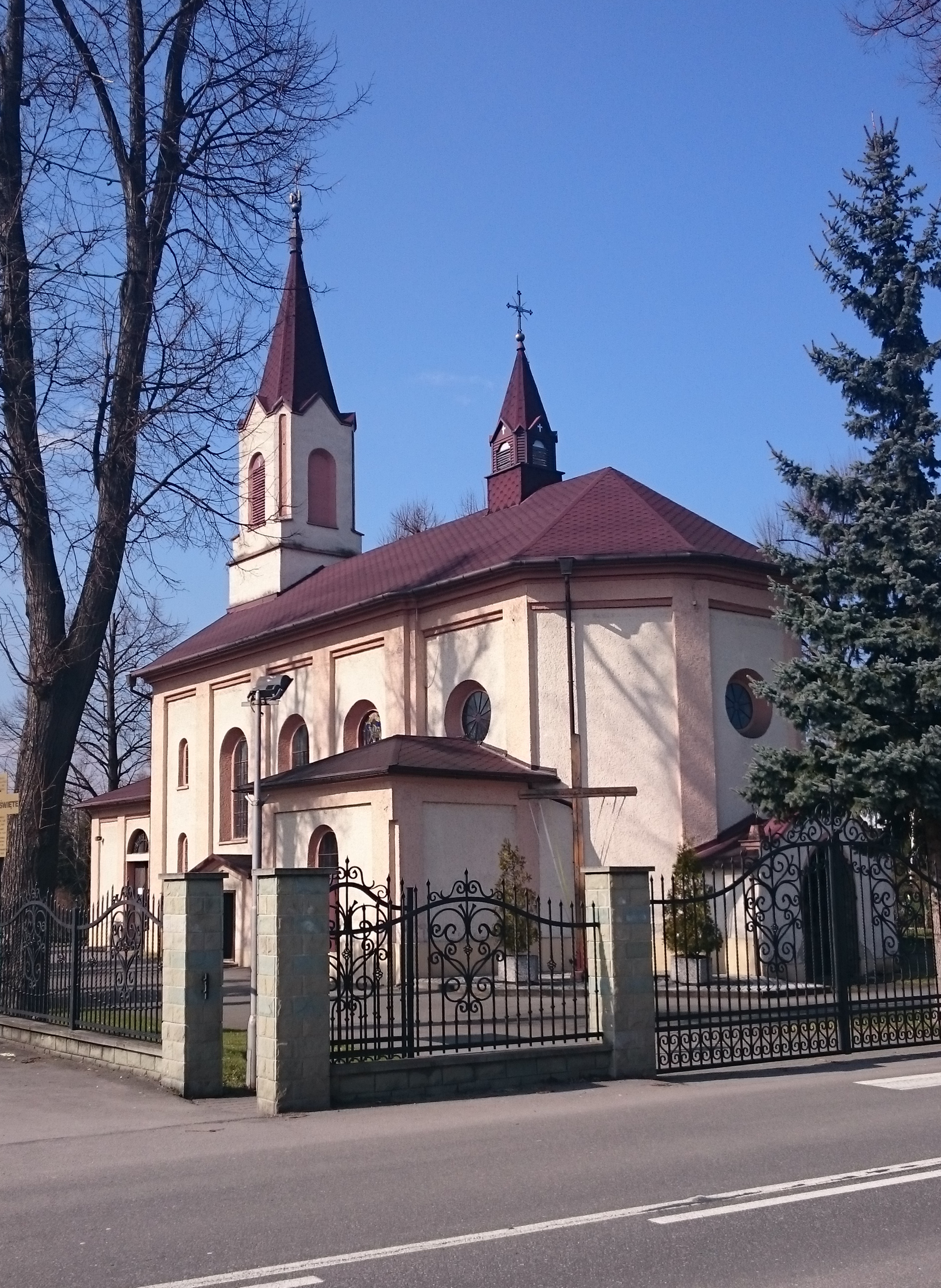
- Immaculate Heart of Mary church

- Location within Poland
- Coordinates: 49°56′N 19°2′E
- Country: Poland
- Voivodeship: Silesian
- County: Bielsko
- Gmina: Bestwina
- Population: 2,926

Kaniów [ˈkaɲuf] is a village in the administrative district of Gmina Bestwina, within Bielsko County, Silesian Voivodeship, in southern Poland. The village is located in the historical region Galicia.
