= Janowice, Silesian Voivodeship =

Janowice
- Village
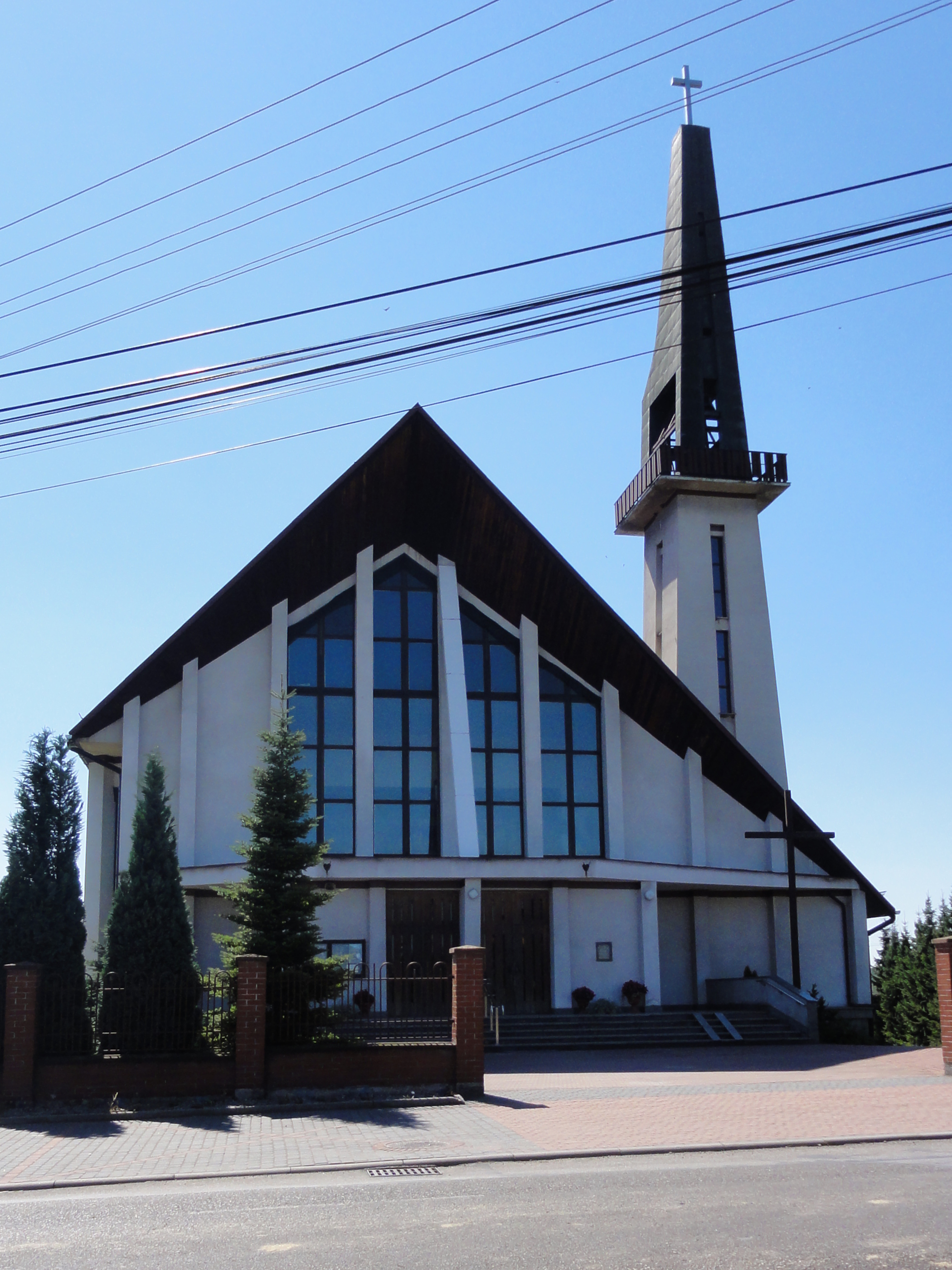
- Catholic church

- Location within Poland
- Coordinates: 49°53′N 19°5′E
- Country: Poland
- Voivodeship: Silesian
- County: Bielsko
- Gmina: Bestwina
- Population: 1,557

Janowice [janɔˈvit͡sɛ] is a village in the administrative district of Gmina Bestwina, within Bielsko County, Silesian Voivodeship, in southern Poland.
