= Gmina Bestwina =

Gmina Bestwina Bestwina Commune
- Gmina
- Coat of arms

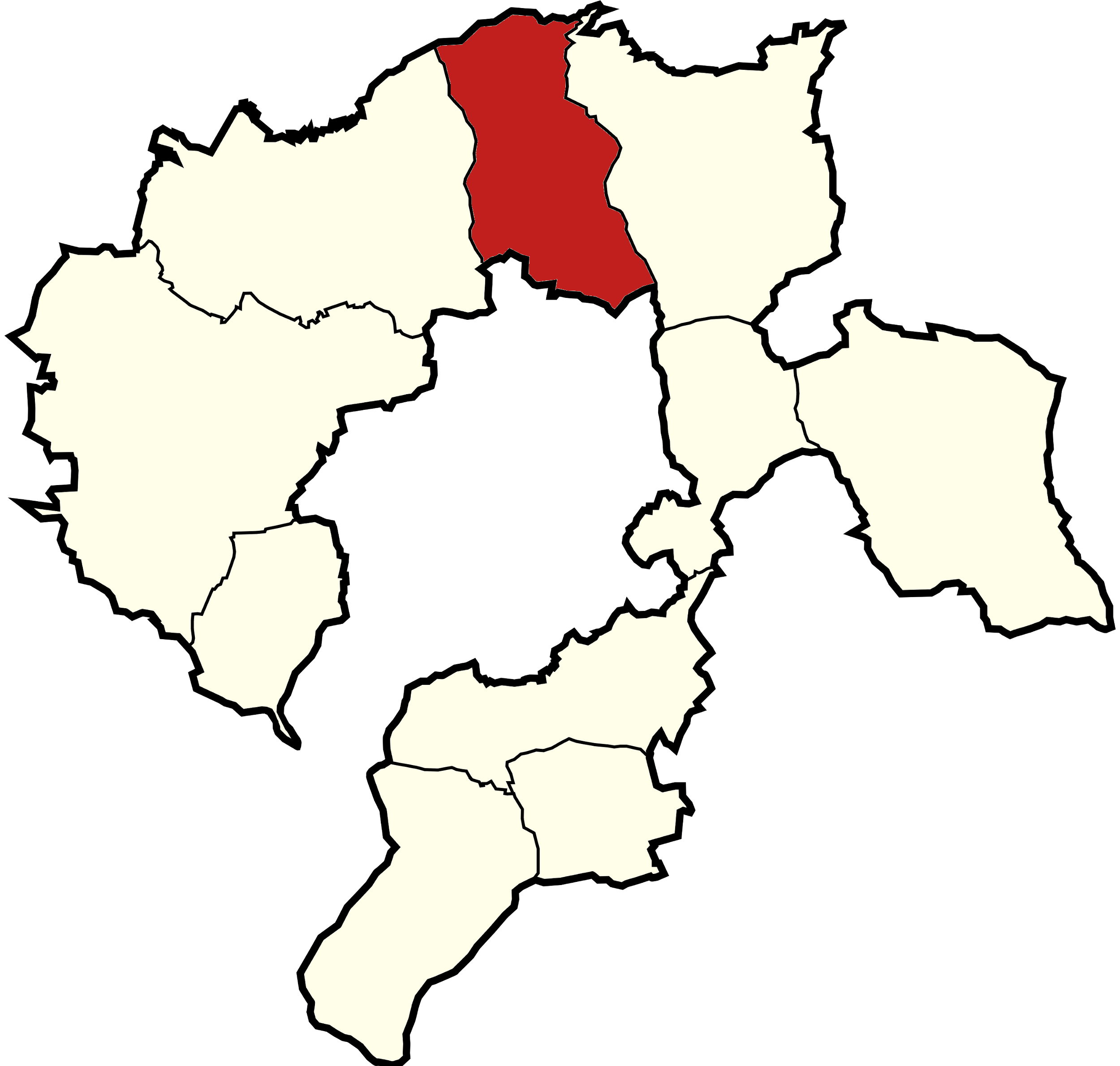
- Gmina Bestwina within the Bielsko County
- Coordinates (Bestwina): 49°53′47″N 19°3′34″E
- Country: Poland
- Voivodeship: Silesian
- County: Bielsko County
- Seat: Bestwina

Area
  - Total: 37.55 km^{2} (14.50 sq mi)

Population (2019-06-30)
  - Total: 11,816
  - Density: 314.7/km^{2} (815.0/sq mi)
- Website: http://www.bestwina.pl

Gmina Bestwina is a rural gmina (administrative district) in Bielsko County, Silesian Voivodeship, in southern Poland. Its seat is the village of Bestwina, which lies approximately 8 kilometres (5 mi) north of Bielsko-Biała and 40 km (25 mi) south of the regional capital Katowice.

The gmina covers an area of 37.55 square kilometres (14.5 sq mi), and as of 2019 its total population is 11,816.

== Villages ==
Gmina Bestwina contains the villages and settlements of Bestwina, Bestwinka, Janowice and Kaniów.

== Neighbouring gminas ==
Gmina Bestwina is bordered by the city of Bielsko-Biała and by the gminas of Czechowice-Dziedzice, Miedźna, Pszczyna and Wilamowice.
