= Archduchess Mechthildis of Austria =

Archduchess Mechthildis
- Princess Czartoryska
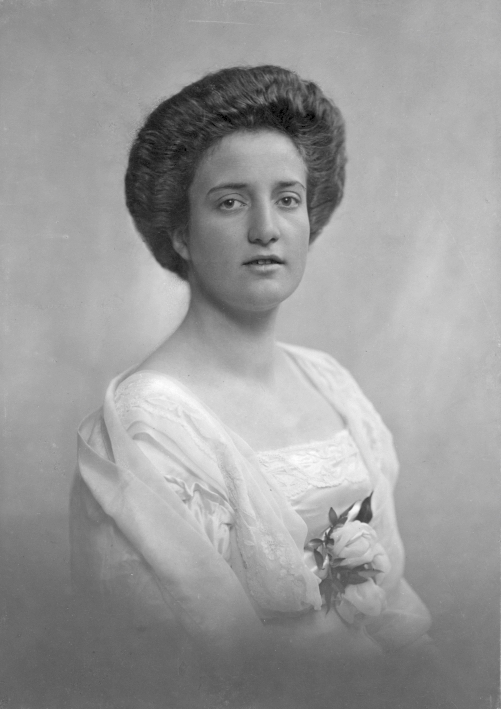
- Photograph, 1913.
- Born: 11 October 1891; Pula, Austria-Hungary
- Died: 2 June 1966 (aged 74); Rio de Janeiro, Brazil
- Burial: Saint John the Baptist's Cemetery
- Spouse: Prince Olgierd Czartoryski (m. 1913)
- Issue: Prince Constantine Czartoryski; Princess Cecylia Czartoryska; Princess Izabella Czartoryska; Prince Alexander Czartoryski
Names
- German: Mechthildis Maria Christina
- House: Habsburg-Lorraine
- Father: Archduke Charles Stephen of Austria
- Mother: Archduchess Maria Theresa of Austria, Princess of Tuscany

Archduchess Mechthildis of Austria (11 October 1891 – 6 February 1966) was the daughter of Archduke Charles Stephen of Austria and a first cousin of King Alfonso XIII of Spain. She was a member of the Teschen branch of the House of Habsburg-Lorraine and an Archduchess of Austria and Princess of Hungary, and Bohemia by birth. In 1913, she married Prince Olgierd Czartoryski. They had four children and lived in Poland until the outbreak of World War II when they emigrated to Brazil.

== Background and early life ==
Archduchess Mechthildis was a daughter of Archduke Charles Stephen of Austria and his wife Archduchess Maria Theresa of Austria, Princess of Tuscany. Both of her parents were closely related to Emperor Franz Joseph. Mechthildis’s father was a grandson of Archduke Charles, Duke of Teschen who had led the Austrian army against Napoleon Bonaparte. Her father was a brother of Queen Maria Christina of Spain. Mechthildis’s mother, Archduchess Maria Theresa of Austria, Princess of Tuscany was a granddaughter of Leopold II, the last reigning Grand Duke of Tuscany. On her mother's side, she was a great-granddaughter of King Ferdinand II of the Two Sicilies.

Archduchess Mechthildis was educated by private tutors, special emphasis was placed on languages. She learned German, Italian, English, French, and from 1895, Polish. Her father had followed a career in the Austrian Navy and Mechthildis spent her formative years primarily in Istria in the then-Austrian port of Pula in the Adriatic. Her father was very wealthy and the family had a winter residence in the island of Losinj in the Adriatic, and a palace in Vienna. In 1895 her father inherited vast properties in Galicia from Archduke Albert, Duke of Teschen. From 1907 the family's main residence was in Saybusch Castle in western Galicia.

== Marriage ==
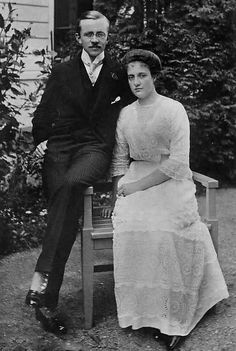
Archduchess Mechthildis and her husband Prince Olgierd Czartoryski, 1913.

Archduke Charles Stephen put aside his career in the navy and centered his ambitions in creating a Polish branch of the house of Habsburg. He encouraged all of his children to become Polish and Archduchess Mechtildis, like her sister Archduchess Renata, married a Polish Prince, Olgierd Czartoryski, in 1913. The marriage took place on 11 January 1913 at Saybusch Castle, two days after her eldest sister Archduchess Eleonora married Alfons von Kloss. Mechtildis had to renounce all of her titles, along with the style of Imperial and Royal Highness, since Prince Olgierd Czartoryski did not belong to a royal family. The couple had four children, two sons and two daughters, and lived on a Czartoryski estate in Poland. At the outbreak of World War II they fled to South America and stayed initially at Petropolis with members of the Brazilian imperial family, the Orléans-Braganza. Prince Olgierd was for many years the Ambassador of the Sovereign Military Order of Malta to Brazil and Paraguay. Archduchess Mechthildis died on 6 February 1966 in Rio de Janeiro, her husband eleven years later. They have descendants in Brazil and in Europe.

== Children ==
Archduchess Mechthildis and her husband Prince Olgierd Czartoryski (1888–1977) had four children:

- Prince Constantine Czartoryski (9 December 1913 – 31 August 1989); married Countess Karolina Plater-Zyberk
- Princess Cecylia Czartoryska (9 April 1915 – 19 April 2011); married Count Jerzy Rostworowski.
- Princess Izabella Czartoryska (8 August 1917 – 2015); married Count Raphael Bninski.
- Prince Alexander Czartoryski (21 October 1919 – 2007)

== Ancestry ==
Ancestors of Archduchess Mechthildis of Austria

8. Archduke Charles, Duke of Teschen
4. Archduke Karl Ferdinand of Austria
9. Princess Henrietta of Nassau-Weilburg
2. Archduke Charles Stephen of Austria
10. Archduke Joseph, Palatine of Hungary
5. Archduchess Elisabeth Franziska of Austria
11. Duchess Maria Dorothea of Württemberg
1. Archduchess Mechthildis of Austria
12. Leopold II, Grand Duke of Tuscany
6. Archduke Karl Salvator, Prince of Tuscany
13. Princess Marie Antoinette of the Two Sicilies
3. Archduchess Maria Theresia, Princess of Tuscany
14. Ferdinand II of the Two Sicilies
7. Princess Maria Immaculata of Bourbon-Two Sicilies
15. Maria Theresa of Austria
