= HMCS Hochelaga =

Steam yacht, patrol ship, and Jewish migrant ship

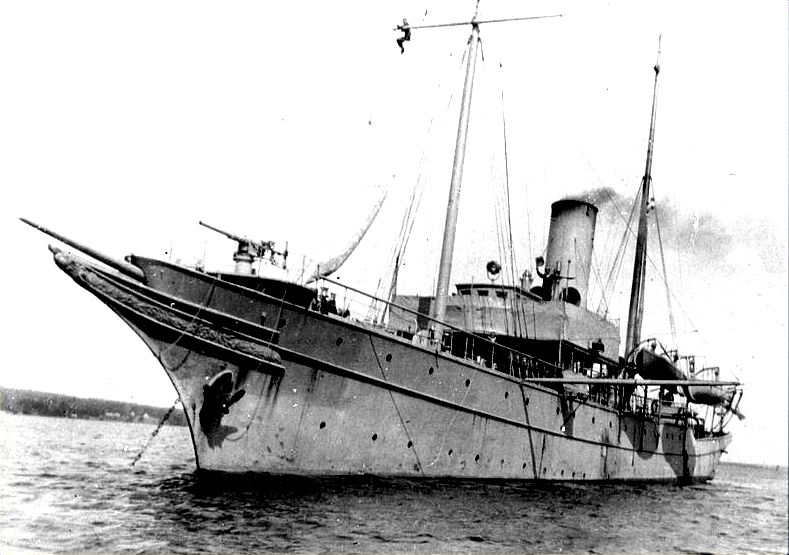
- HMCS Hochelaga armed with a 12-pounder gun

History
- Name: 1900: Waturus; 1915: Hochelaga; 1946: HaChayal Ha'Ivri; 1947: Hochelaga
- Owner: 1900: Archduke Charles Stephen; 1902: Randal Morgan; 1917: Minister of Naval Service; 1923: Hochelaga S&T Co, Ltd; 1942: Thomas C Wilwerth; 1943: Janet Steamship Corp; 1951: Cía Maritima Las Palmas
- Operator: 1915: (Canada) Royal Canadian Navy
- Port of registry: 1900: (Austria-Hungary) Lussingrande; 1902: (United States) Philadelphia; 1917: (Canada) Ottawa; 1943: (Honduras) Puerto Cortés; 1951: Panama
- Builder: Hawthorns & Co, Leith
- Yard number: 83
- Launched: 30 April 1900
- Completed: July 1900
- Refit: 1902, 1915
- Identification: 1917: UK official number 138074
- Fate: unknown

General characteristics
- Type: steam yacht
- Tonnage: 1900: 671 GRT; 1917: 628 GRT, 427 NRT
- Length: 192.6 ft (58.7 m)
- Beam: 27.6 ft (8.4 m)
- Depth: 14.8 ft (4.5 m)
- Decks: 2
- Installed power: 162 NHP
- Propulsion: 1 × triple-expansion engine; 1 × screw
- Speed: 12 knots (22 km/h)
- Sensors & processing systems: by 1926: submarine signalling
- Armament: 1915: 1 × 12-pounder gun

HMCS Hochelaga was a steam yacht that was converted into a Royal Canadian Navy (RCN) patrol ship. She was built in Scotland, and launched in 1900 as Waturus for Archduke Charles Stephen of Austria. He sold her to a US buyer in 1902, who sold her to the Canadian Government in 1915. She was converted into an armed yacht, renamed Hochelaga, and patrolled the Atlantic coast of Canada. She was in naval service until 1920, when she was offered for sale. From 1923 to 1942 Hochelaga was a ferry linking Prince Edward Island and Nova Scotia. From 1943 to 1945 the United Fruit Company used her in the sugar trade with Puerto Rico. In 1946 she was renamed HaChayal Ha'Ivri, although officially she remained registered as Hochelaga. As HaChayal Ha'Ivri she tried to take Jewish emigrants from Belgium to Palestine, but was intercepted by the Royal Navy. By 1951 she was registered under the Panamanian flag of convenience. Lloyd's Register still listed her in 1959.

== Waturus ==
Hawthorn and Company of Leith, Scotland built the ship as yard number 83. She was launched on 30 April 1900 as Waturus, and completed that July. Her registered length was 192 ft 6 in (58.67 m), her beam was 27 ft 6 in (8.38 m), and her depth was 14 ft 8 in (4.47 m). Her tonnages were 628 GRT and 427 NRT. She had a single screw, driven by a three-cylinder triple-expansion engine that was rated at 162 nominal horsepower and gave her a speed of 12 knots (22 km/h; 14 mph). She had a steel hull, clipper bow, two masts, and one funnel.

Archduke Charles Stephen registered Waturus at Lussingrande on the Adriatic Sea. In June 1902 he sold her to Randal Morgan of Philadelphia, who registered her in the Port of Philadelphia. Morgan paid $150,000 for her, and spent another $40,000 having her refitted. Morgan entered Waturus in races on the East Coast of the United States.

== Hochelaga as an armed yacht ==
In World War I the RCN sought vessels suitable for conversion to patrol Canada's Atlantic coast against U-boats. Finding few available in Canada, the RCN sent agents to acquire vessels in the United States. In July 1915 it sent Aemilius Jarvis to buy two yachts in New York City. One of these was Waturus, which in 1914 was for sale via shipbrokers Cox & Stevens for $80,000. Jarvis bought her, and she was sailed to Montreal for conversion to an armed yacht. On 13 August 1915 she was commissioned as HMCS Hochelaga – an historic name associated with Canada, the voyages of Jacques Cartier, and the city of Montreal.

Hochelaga reached Sydney, Nova Scotia in September 1915 to patrol the Atlantic coast. From 1917 she was registered in Ottawa as a civilian ship, with the United Kingdom official number 138074, and the Minister of Naval Service as her manager, although in fact she remained in RCN service. She was in Halifax Harbour during the Halifax Explosion in 1917. She was damaged, and several members of her crew were injured. She was part of the East Coast patrol until 1918.

On 21 August 1918 Hochelaga, while performing an anti-submarine patrol with a flotilla of four ships off the coast of Nova Scotia, found U-156 as it was boarding and sinking Canadian fishing schooners. Hochelaga's commander, Lieutenant RD Legate, ordered the ship to turn and head back towards the flotilla instead of intercepting the enemy. For failing to confront the enemy he was arrested and court-martialled in Halifax in October. Legate was found guilty and dismissed from the service.

Hochelaga remained on the Atlantic patrol until the end of the war, and remained in RCN service until 1920. She was briefly reactivated for active duty in July 1919 for Edward, Prince of Wales' visit to Canada and carried several guests, including Admiral Sir Charles Kingsmill and the Governor General of Canada, along the St. Lawrence and Saguenay Rivers. In October 1919 she toured the lighthouses and maritime radio stations along the coasts of the Gulf of St. Lawrence and Newfoundland. She was paid off on 30 October 1920 and offered for sale. She was not sold until 23 February 1923, when John Simon of Halifax, Nova Scotia bought her.

== Hochelaga in civilian service ==
Hochelaga's new owner was the Hochelaga Shipping and Towing Co Ltd of Halifax. She became a ferry between Pictou, Nova Scotia and Charlottetown, Prince Edward Island. By 1926 she was equipped with submarine signalling.

In 1942 Thomas C Wilwerth of New York bought Hochelaga, and commissioned Sullivan Shipyard in Brooklyn to convert her boiler furnaces from coal to oil fuel. However, the US Government took over the yard for Second World War work, and required Wilwerth to remove his ship. He moved Hochelaga to Todd Shipyards to complete the conversion. The United States Coast Guard inspected her there, and found several hull plates needed replacing, and the number of crew should be increased to 24. On 3 July 1943, the United States Marshals Service seized the ship in lieu of unpaid bills.

In 1943 the Janet Steamship Corporation, a subsidiary of the United Fruit Company, bought Hochelaga from the US Government. She was registered in Puerto Cortés in Honduras, and used in the sugar trade with Puerto Rico. Janet Steamship Corp was registered as her owner until 1949, when Lloyd's Register recorded that she was intended to be broken up. However, another source asserts that United Fruit sold her at the end of the Second World War.

The same source asserts that in 1946 an Em Fostinis of Marseille owned Hochelaga, although she remained registered in Honduras. She was renamed HaChayal Ha'Ivri – Hebrew for "Jewish Soldier", although this name was not recorded with Lloyd's Register. On 14 July 1946 she left Antwerp carrying 550 Jewish emigrants to try to enter British-ruled Palestine. The destroyer HMS Saumarez intercepted her off Haifa, and she and her passengers were escorted to Cyprus.

By 1951 a Compañía Maritima Las Palmas was recorded as owning Hochelaga, and she was registered in Panama. Lloyd's Register continued to record her under the same owner and port of registry until at least 1959.

== Bibliography ==
- Gimblett, Richard H., ed. (2009). The Naval Service of Canada 1910–2010: The Centennial Story. Toronto: Dundurn Press. ISBN 978-1-4597-1322-2.
- Johnston, William; Rawling, William G.P.; Gimblett, Richard H. & MacFarlane, John (2010). The Seabound Coast: The Official History of the Royal Canadian Navy, 1867–1939. Vol. 1. Toronto: Dundurn Press. ISBN 978-1-55488-908-2.
- Lloyd's Register of Shipping. Vol. II.–Steamers & Motorships. London: Lloyd's Register of Shipping. 1926 – via Internet Archive.
- Lloyd's Register of Shipping (PDF). Vol. II.–Steamers and Motorships of 300 tons gross and over. London: Lloyd's Register of Shipping. 1943 – via Southampton City Council.
- Macpherson, Ken & Barrie, Ron (2002). The Ships of Canada's Naval Forces 1910–2002 (Third ed.). St Catherine's, ON: Vanwell Publishing. ISBN 1-55125-072-1.
- McKee, Fraser (1983). The Armed Yachts of Canada. Erin, ON: The Boston Mills Press. ISBN 0-919822-55-X.
- Mercantile Navy List. London. 1918 – via Crew List Index Project.
- Mercantile Navy List. London. 1924 – via Crew List Index Project.
- Register Book. Vol. I. A – L. London: Lloyd's Register of Shipping. 1949 – via Internet Archive.
- Register Book. Vol. I. A – L. London: Lloyd's Register of Shipping. 1951 – via Internet Archive.
- Register Book. Vol. I. Register of Ships. London: Lloyd's Register of Shipping. 1959 – via Internet Archive.
- Yacht Register. London: Lloyd's Register of British and Foreign Shipping. 1900 – via Internet Archive.
- Yacht Register. London: Lloyd's Register of British and Foreign Shipping. 1903 – via Internet Archive.
