= Archduke Wilhelm of Austria =

Austrian archduke (1895–1948)

Archduke Wilhelm
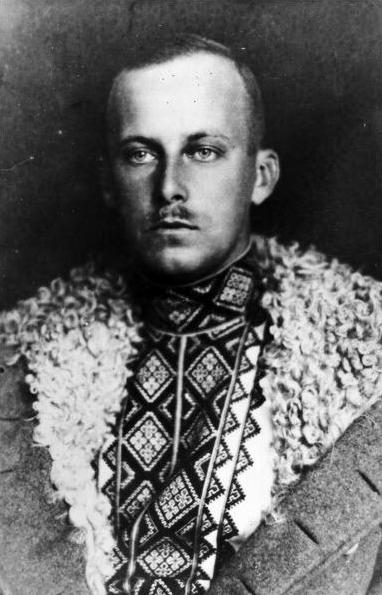
- Wilhelm in 1918
- Born: 10 February 1895; Lötzing, Austria-Hungary (present-day Croatia)
- Died: 18 August 1948 (aged 53); Kyiv, Ukrainian Soviet Socialist Republic, Soviet Union
- House: Habsburg-Lorraine
- Father: Archduke Charles Stephen of Austria
- Mother: Archduchess Maria Theresa of Austria

Archduke Wilhelm Franz of Austria, later known as Wilhelm Franz von Habsburg-Lothringen (10 February 1895 – 18 August 1948), and also referred to as Vasyl Vyshyvanyi (Ukrainian: Василь Вишиваний), was an Austrian archduke, a colonel in the Ukrainian Sich Riflemen, a poet, and a member of the House of Habsburg-Lorraine.

== Biography ==
=== Background and early life ===
Archduke Wilhelm was the youngest son of Archduke Karl Stephan and Archduchess Maria Theresia, Princess of Tuscany. He was born on the family estate on the island of Lošinj in the Austrian Littoral (present-day Croatia). During his arrest by Soviet authorities, he stated that his place of birth was the city of Pola (then in Italy, now Pula, Croatia). He also declared his social status as a "landowner" (pomeshchik) and stated that he was unemployed. However, this was inaccurate, as he was in fact a businessman and entrepreneur at the time of his arrest.

Wilhelm was raised on his family's estate in the city of Saybusch, in the Kingdom of Galicia and Lodomeria (present-day Żywiec, Poland). His father was a Polish patriot who regarded the Ukrainian population as inferior. In line with the rise of 19th-century nationalism, Karl Stephan decided that his branch of the Habsburg family would adopt a Polish identity, combining loyalty to the Habsburg dynasty with loyalty to Poland. He ensured that his children learned Polish from an early age and sought to instil in them a sense of Polish patriotism. His eldest son, Karl-Albrecht, became a Polish officer and refused to renounce his Polish allegiance. Karl Stephan's two younger daughters married into the Polish noble families of Radziwiłł and Czartoryski.

Wilhelm, the youngest child, rebelled and came to identify with the Poles' rivals, the Ukrainians. As a boy, he was taught that Ukrainians were bandits and a tribe of robbers. In 1912, at the age of 17, Wilhelm decided to see this "mysterious" people firsthand. He travelled incognito by train to Worochta (now Vorokhta), and visited a number of Hutsul villages. Finding no evidence of banditry, he developed a deep fascination with Ukrainian culture, which he retained for the rest of his life.

His interest in the relatively impoverished Ukrainian people earned him the nickname "the Red Prince". Eventually, his family came to accept and even support this interest. According to historian Timothy D. Snyder, Wilhelm was groomed by the Habsburgs to assume a leadership role among the Ukrainian people, in a manner akin to the role his father and elder brother were expected to play among the Habsburgs' Polish subjects.

=== World War I ===
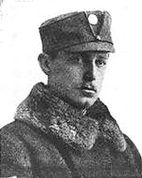
Photo during World War I

At the outbreak of World War I, Wilhelm was studying at the Vienna War College. Upon graduating in 1915, he began his military service on the front lines as part of a company in the 13th Galicia Lancer (Ulan) Regiment. The regiment, based around Solotschiw, was largely composed of Ukrainian soldiers. While serving, Wilhelm began reading works by Ukrainian authors such as Mykhailo Hrushevsky, Ivan Franko, and Taras Shevchenko. His soldiers gifted him a traditional Ukrainian embroidered shirt, or vyshyvanka, which he wore beneath his uniform. He asked his men to address him as "Vasyl", and the embroidered shirt earned him the nickname "Vyshyvanyi".

During this period, Wilhelm often defended Galician Ukrainians from suspicion and arrest by the predominantly Polish local administration, which questioned their loyalty to Austria-Hungary.

In 1916, Wilhelm returned from the front upon turning 21, the age at which male members of the House of Habsburg automatically became deputies in the upper house of the Austrian Parliament. In Parliament, he collaborated closely with Ukrainian deputies and with Metropolitan Archbishop Andrey Sheptytsky. He also acted as a liaison between Ukrainian community leaders and Emperor Charles I, a personal acquaintance from childhood, and was able to make an official visit to the Emperor in early 1917.

Wilhelm supported the idea of resolving the "Ukrainian question" through the creation of an autonomous Grand Duchy of Ukraine within the Habsburg monarchy (see United States of Greater Austria). This proposed duchy would include Eastern Galicia and Bukovina, as well as Ukrainian territories then part of the Russian Empire, which would need to be reconquered.

According to some historians, including Timothy D. Snyder, Wilhelm saw himself as a suitable candidate to lead such a duchy, as he was a member of the ruling dynasty, had learned the language, and had gained respect among Ukrainians. This mirrored the situation in 1916 when Wilhelm's father, Archduke Karl Stephan, was considered for the Polish throne following the restoration of the Kingdom of Poland. However, other historians argue that Wilhelm, or "Vasyl Vyshyvanyi", did not personally aspire to a throne and later stated that he would only accept a leadership role in Ukraine if it were the will of the majority of the population.

==== Ukrainian–Soviet War ====
Following the collapse of the Russian Empire, the Ukrainian People's Republic was established. After the Treaty of Brest-Litovsk, Austria-Hungary and the German Empire provided military support to Ukraine in its fight against the Bolsheviks. Promoted to the rank of captain, Vasyl Vyshyvanyi was appointed to lead the "Battle Group Archduke Wilhelm", a unit created by Emperor Charles I, composed of approximately 4,000 Ukrainian soldiers and officers drawn from the Austrian Legion of Sich Riflemen.

The unit was deployed to southern Ukraine to fight Bolshevik forces. Initially, Austrian troops entered the already-liberated city of Kherson and later remained in Aleksandrovsk (present-day Zaporizhzhia) for two months. During this time, Wilhelm undertook a range of initiatives: fostering connections between the Galician riflemen and local Ukrainians, cooperating with the cultural organisation Prosvita, and working to boost morale by visiting sites of Cossack heritage with his troops.

His forces occupied a small area near the historical site of the Zaporozhian Sich, and promoted the Ukrainian national cause through a variety of measures, including vetting officials by ethnicity, launching a newspaper, and organising cultural activities for local peasants. Wilhelm integrated easily with the rural population, gaining admiration for his modest lifestyle. Within his occupation zone, peasants retained lands seized in 1917, and Wilhelm blocked the requisitioning of grain by Habsburg forces. He also offered refuge to Ukrainians who had resisted German or Austrian requisitions elsewhere.

During this time, Wilhelm's forces developed close ties with local fighters, including the Skhidniaky ("Easterners"), especially the Zaporizhzhia Corps of the Ukrainian Army. Although these actions drew criticism from German and Austrian officials in Kyiv, they increased Wilhelm's popularity among Ukrainians, who affectionately referred to him as Kniaz Vasyl (Prince Vasyl).

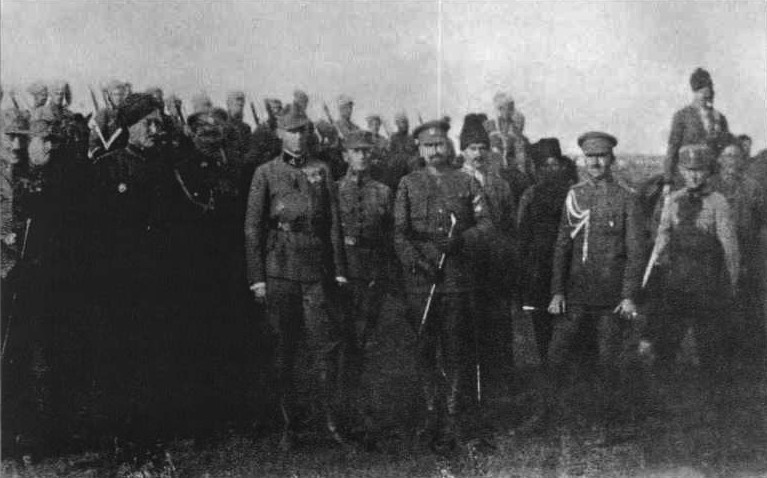
With Petro Bolbochan in Ukraine (1918)

In April 1918, a coup in Ukraine replaced the republican government with the regime of Hetman Pavlo Skoropadskyi, a former Imperial Russian general. During this period, German authorities feared that Wilhelm might attempt a coup of his own to overthrow the Hetman. Skoropadskyi was unpopular among soldiers of the Zaporizhzhia Corps and the Legion of Sich Riflemen. Officers in the Zaporizhzhia Division even discussed plans to install Archduke Wilhelm as the sovereign of Ukraine. One of the leading advocates was Colonel Petro Bolbochan, who was later executed on orders from Symon Petliura.

Wilhelm was hesitant and consulted Emperor Charles I, who rejected the plan on the grounds that it would jeopardise relations with Germany. According to some scholars, the Habsburgs hoped to establish a politically autonomous Ukraine as a counterbalance to German influence in the region.

Wilhelm and his troops were ultimately recalled from Ukraine in October 1918 amid revolutionary upheaval and redeployed to the Duchy of Bukovina. In Czernowitz (present-day Chernivtsi), he was hospitalised with tuberculosis. At his urging, two regiments consisting mostly of Ukrainian troops were stationed in Lemberg (modern-day Lviv) in October 1918. This deployment helped set the stage for the proclamation of the West Ukrainian People's Republic on 1 November.

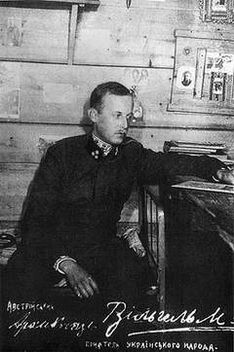
Photo of Archduke Wilhelm (signed in Cyrillic) as a member of the Ukrainian Army General Staff, 1919

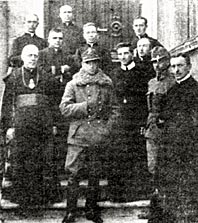
Photo with Ukrainian Greek Catholic clergy in Ternopil, 1918

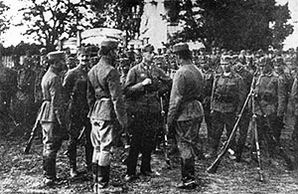
Photo with Austrian Legion of Sich Riflemen in 1918

While Wilhelm was in hospital, the First World War ended, the Austro-Hungarian Empire collapsed, and the Habsburg dynasty was dethroned. In Eastern Galicia, the West Ukrainian National Republic was declared, and Ukrainians in Bukovina sought, unsuccessfully, to unite with it. Romanian forces occupied Bukovina, prompting Wilhelm to flee to Lviv to avoid arrest. When Lviv fell under Polish control, he moved to the Carpathian region, where he hid in monasteries for nearly six months.

Meanwhile, German troops withdrew from Ukraine, and the regime of Hetman Skoropadskyi was overthrown by the Directorate, led by Volodymyr Vynnychenko and Symon Petliura. As the Ukrainian independence movement sought support from the Allies, the presence of a Habsburg figure like Wilhelm became politically inconvenient, as Polish authorities portrayed Ukrainian aspirations as an Austrian conspiracy.

In June 1919, Wilhelm was arrested by Romanian troops while crossing the Carpathians. He was detained for three months but was released after a petition by the Ukrainian People's Republic. He travelled to Kamianets-Podilskyi, then the Ukrainian capital, where he pledged loyalty to the Ukrainian People's Republic and was appointed a colonel, heading the international relations section of the General Staff Main Department within the Ukrainian People's Army. However, he resigned in 1920 in protest against Petliura's peace treaty with Poland, which he regarded as a betrayal, and went into exile in Vienna.

=== Interwar period ===
In an interview published in a Viennese newspaper in January 1921, Wilhelm publicly criticised Poland, condemning the pogroms in Lwów as actions unthinkable in a civilised country, and referring to Poland and Poles as dishonourable. This statement resulted in a permanent public estrangement between Wilhelm and his father, Archduke Karl Stephan. Formally, Wilhelm remained on the payroll of the Ukrainian Army as a colonel for a short period, until the Austrian press reported his anti-Polish remarks. Following this, the Ukrainian government-in-exile, then temporarily based in Poland, officially dismissed him from his post.

In the same year, Wilhelm published a volume of poetry in Ukrainian titled Mynayut Dni (Минають дні, The Days Pass).

Among Ukrainian political émigrés, there remained a belief that the Soviet regime could still be overthrown. In Vienna, Wilhelm became involved with pro-Ukrainian monarchist circles who viewed him as a potential figurehead, though no concrete outcomes resulted from these efforts.

Under the laws of the newly established Republic of Austria, members of the former Habsburg dynasty could only acquire citizenship and residency by formally renouncing all claims to rule. Wilhelm refused to do so and thus lived in Vienna without legal status. In 1922, he managed to obtain a blank Austrian passport, into which he entered his new identity as "Vasyl Vyshyvanyi". Under this name, he left Austria for Spain, hoping—ultimately in vain—to secure financial support for his Ukrainian aspirations from his cousin, King Alfonso XIII. When Spain became a republic in 1931, he relocated to Paris.

Following the death of his father in 1933, Wilhelm's brothers, who had inherited a brewery and estates in Żywiec, Poland, settled his debts and provided him with a monthly stipend.

In Paris, Vyshyvanyi reconnected with members of the Ukrainian diaspora. He came into contact with members of the newly established Organisation of Ukrainian Nationalists (OUN) and met twice with its leader, Yevhen Konovalets. The OUN saw Wilhelm as a possible conduit for securing new sources of financial support.

In 1934 or 1935, Wilhelm became entangled in a criminal case involving his companion Paulette Couyba, who attempted to defraud a French investor (an alcohol dealer) of several hundred thousand francs using a forged bank cheque. Wilhelm was present at a meeting between Couyba and the investor, possibly to lend the scheme credibility. He later claimed to have been unaware of the nature of the transaction. Initially, Couyba pleaded guilty, but later shifted the blame to Wilhelm, claiming the funds were intended to support a Habsburg restoration. The case received widespread attention in the left-leaning French press, which was already hostile to the Habsburg name. Facing negative publicity and fearing an unjust verdict, Wilhelm fled Paris for Vienna before trial.

A police informant also alleged that Wilhelm had engaged in sexual relationships with two male assistants, a claim that may have further influenced public opinion. Ultimately, Wilhelm was sentenced in absentia to five years in prison, while Couyba was released.

American historian Timothy D. Snyder, author of The Red Prince, maintains that Wilhelm was innocent of the charges. Snyder, along with some of Wilhelm's contemporaries, has suggested the case may have been manipulated by foreign intelligence services—possibly from Poland, Czechoslovakia, or the Soviet Union—in order to discredit the Habsburgs and prevent any resurgence of their political influence. Supporting this theory is the claim that Couyba later attempted, under a false name and pretext, to enter Austria, possibly to amplify the scandal further.

By the 1930s, the Austrian government under Chancellor Engelbert Dollfuss had become more favourable towards the Habsburgs and no longer required them to renounce political aspirations. Wilhelm was subsequently able to obtain Austrian citizenship and a passport under his real name. For a time, he expressed support for Austrian and Italian fascists, and by the late 1930s showed increasing sympathy for German National Socialism—an ideology rejected by most members of the Habsburg family, and with which mutual hostility existed.

At the time, Wilhelm believed that a new European war could present an opportunity for Ukraine to regain its independence, and perceived Nazi Germany as the only major power potentially willing to support such an endeavour. He initially welcomed the 1938 Anschluss of Austria and formally declared himself a member of the German nation.

However, Wilhelm soon realised that the Nazi regime had no intention of establishing an independent Ukrainian state, even as a puppet regime similar to that of Slovakia. After he and his brother Karl Albrecht were arrested and interrogated by the Gestapo, Wilhelm became disillusioned and shifted his allegiance, ultimately joining the anti-Nazi resistance in Vienna.

=== World War II, French Resistance, and relations with the Banderites ===
The exact moment when Wilhelm Habsburg turned against the Nazis remains unclear. According to historian Timothy D. Snyder, by early 1942 he may have already been engaged in intelligence activities, potentially on behalf of the British Secret Intelligence Service (SIS), which supported anti-Nazi resistance movements across Europe. Eventually, he worked as an agent for the French Resistance, gathering intelligence not only against Nazi Germany but later also against the Soviet Union.

In 1944, Wilhelm made the acquaintance of a French national named Paul Maas—alternatively recorded in documents as Masse—although it is possible that this name was a pseudonym. Maas had been deported by German authorities from France to Vienna, where he was forced to work in a military aviation factory designing blueprints. Maas maintained connections with either British intelligence, the French Resistance, or both. He passed copies of aircraft blueprints to his handlers and invited Wilhelm to collaborate with him in the resistance effort. Owing to his social standing and connections with German officers, Wilhelm was able to provide valuable intelligence, including information on troop movements and military production in Austria. During later interrogations, Wilhelm claimed that his motivation was driven purely by hatred of Nazism.

During the war, Wilhelm also befriended Roman Novosad, a Ukrainian student at the Vienna Music Academy. Novosad lived nearby, knew Maas, and assisted with some of his requests. In 1944, through Novosad, Wilhelm learned of a woman known as Lidia Tulchyn—real name Hanna Prokopych—who served as a liaison for the Bandera faction of the Organisation of Ukrainian Nationalists (OUN-B). As the war neared its end, the Ukrainian nationalist movement increasingly sought alliances with the Western powers, who were concerned about Soviet expansion following the war. Wilhelm decided to serve as an intermediary between the OUN and the network connected to Maas.

Wilhelm introduced Lidia to Maas, who agreed to cooperate with the Ukrainian nationalists and assigned her an initial task: locating German documents for a downed British pilot in Austria. Lidia successfully completed the assignment. Subsequently, she informed Wilhelm that a senior figure from the OUN had arrived in Vienna. Wilhelm met the man—introduced as Dmytro-Volodymyr—at Novosad's flat and later introduced him to Maas. The individual was, in fact, Myroslav Prokop, a leader of both the OUN and the Ukrainian Supreme Liberation Council (UHVR).

In 1945, Maas was arrested by the German Abwehr, but despite being tortured, he did not reveal any names. Following the entry of the Red Army into Vienna, he was freed, only to be later arrested by the Soviet counter-intelligence agency SMERSH. He was eventually released and returned to France. Lidia also fled Vienna, eventually arriving at a displaced persons camp in Bavaria, then under American occupation. Wilhelm and Novosad chose to remain in Vienna, though they risked arrest by SMERSH. However, with the division of the city into occupation zones, their residence fell under British jurisdiction, providing a degree of protection.

During the war, Wilhelm had received financial compensation from the German Reich for family property in Żywiec that had been confiscated by the Nazis. With these funds, he founded three small enterprises involved in the production of paint, varnish, and synthetic resins. He also joined the conservative Austrian People's Party, which won the first post-war elections and formed the government. His Soviet dossier also included a membership certificate for a post-war Austrian anti-fascist organisation in the name of Wilhelm Habsburg-Lothringen.

At some point, Maas introduced Wilhelm to an associate named Jack Brier, who, in turn, introduced him in 1946 to French military officer Jean Pélissier. Pélissier had been tasked by French authorities with re-establishing contact with Ukrainian nationalists who continued armed resistance against the Soviet regime. The emerging confrontation between the Western Allies and the Soviet Union—which would later become the Cold War—created interest in supporting anti-Soviet movements. French intelligence offered support for dropping political propaganda and Ukrainian militants into Soviet territory to bolster the Ukrainian Insurgent Army (UPA).

Initially, French representatives expressed a desire to meet Stepan Bandera himself. When that proved impractical, they agreed to meet one of his close associates instead. Wilhelm considered contacting Lidia, but as she was now in a displaced persons camp and his connection with her had been lost, he and Pélissier agreed to send Novosad to locate her. Despite the risk, Novosad accepted the mission. Pélissier provided him with a pass granting access to the French occupation zone in western Austria, stating he was travelling to Innsbruck for a concert performance.

Novosad successfully reached Munich without attracting the attention of Soviet forces and found Lidia (Hanna) in a displaced persons camp. Shortly afterwards, in a hotel near Innsbruck, he facilitated a meeting involving Pélissier, Mykola Lebed, Roman, Lidia, and Jack Brier. While the details of the negotiations were largely between Pélissier and Lebed, Novosad recalled that the French were satisfied with the outcome. Around this time, another Ukrainian, Vasyl Kachorovsky, was recruited by French intelligence through Wilhelm's mediation.

=== Arrest ===
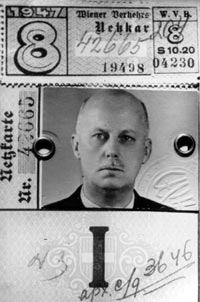
Wilhelm of Austria before arrest in 1947

In March 1947, at his apartment in the American occupation zone of Vienna, Vasyl Kachorovsky reportedly celebrated his birthday too loudly, prompting neighbours to call the police. The Austrian law enforcement officers subsequently handed him over to the Soviet authorities. The Counter-Intelligence Department (SMERSH) of the Ministry of State Security (MGB), part of the Central Group of Forces stationed in Austria, had already taken an interest in Kachorovsky. Several months earlier, they had attempted to detain him, though he managed to resist arrest and escape.

Following Kachorovsky's interrogation, the MGB became aware of Roman Novosad and Vasyl Vyshyvanyi. The latter had evidently already been under Soviet surveillance. After several months of pursuit, Soviet agents first detained Novosad on 14 June, followed by Wilhelm (Vyshyvanyi) on 26 August. According to historian Timothy Snyder, Kachorovsky was subsequently executed, though the source of this information is unclear.

Novosad and Wilhelm were held and interrogated at the MGB prison in Baden bei Wien. A joint criminal case was opened against both men, which remains preserved in the archives in Kyiv. Novosad later recalled that Wilhelm was treated "quite properly" by the Soviet authorities, suggesting he was not subjected to torture. Regarding his own treatment, Novosad did not provide any details. Wilhelm was reportedly given his own food plate, unlike other prisoners who were made to share.

During his imprisonment, Wilhelm was asked in which language he preferred to give testimony; he stated he could do so in Ukrainian. However, the official protocols were nonetheless written in Russian. Several early protocols concluded with the phrase, "The protocol is written down from my words correctly. It was read to me in comprehensible Russian language," although this was later amended from "Russian" to "Ukrainian". Novosad, who was able to testify in both Russian and Ukrainian, had his statements recorded in Russian.

The investigators were particularly interested in Wilhelm's earlier political activities and his contacts during the First Liberation War, including with Petro Bolbochan, Symon Petliura, and Pavlo Skoropadskyi. However, their main focus was his cooperation with Paul Maas, Jean Pélissier, and Lidia Tulchyn. Wilhelm sought to downplay his involvement in the Ukrainian revolution, for example, stating that he had served only as an interpreter in Kamianets-Podilskyi during the time of the Directorate in 1919. In early protocols, he also claimed that the meeting near Innsbruck had not been related to establishing contacts between the French and the OUN, but rather concerned the fate of Ukrainian displaced persons. However, as the interrogation progressed—particularly following Novosad's testimony—a clearer picture of events emerged.

Despite the suspects signing each protocol with the statement that it had been "written correctly from my words," some of the recorded responses were evidently composed by the investigators. For example, one protocol includes the line, "My stay in Ukraine was the result of an aggressive policy of Austria-Hungary's imperialistic and ruling circles," a statement unlikely to have been used by Wilhelm himself, given its overt Soviet ideological tone. This type of language is characteristic of interrogation records from the Stalinist period.

In November 1947, the SMERSH officers of the Central Group of Forces decided to transfer the case and the detainees to their Ukrainian counterparts. Wilhelm and Novosad were transported to Kyiv shortly before the New Year. Interrogations resumed in January 1948 following the holiday period. Ukrainian investigators focused particularly on Wilhelm and Novosad's alleged links with British intelligence, rather than with the French services. The Soviet authorities insisted that the two men, through Maas, had intentionally worked for British intelligence.

Wilhelm initially denied the claim, stating that Novosad had only told him about Maas's connections with the British after Maas had returned to France. However, he later retracted this and gave a confession, the authenticity of which remains uncertain. Interrogations continued until May 1948, after which the two were transferred from the MGB's internal prison to MVD Prison No. 1, also known as Lukyanivska Prison.

In addition to the testimonies of Wilhelm, Novosad, and Kachorovsky, the case file included statements from other Ukrainian nationalists. One individual, for example, claimed to have heard of Wilhelm's connections with the Organisation of Ukrainian Nationalists (OUN). Investigators also submitted as evidence an extract from the 1935 book Ukrainskie sechevye streltsy, published in Lwów, which mentioned Wilhelm's stay in southern Ukraine in 1918.

=== Indictment ===
Wilhelm Habsburg-Lothringen was charged with the following in his indictment:

- During World War I, he allegedly "carried out the aggressive plans of the Austro-Hungarian ruling circles and prepared to become the hetman of Ukraine".
- He fought against the Soviet Army in 1918 (although in reality it was the Red Army).
- He served under Symon Petliura.
- He engaged in nationalist activities while in exile.
- In 1944, he was allegedly recruited by British intelligence and carried out its tasks (notably, the indictment does not mention Wilhelm's role in establishing contacts between Maas and the Organisation of Ukrainian Nationalists (OUN), only with German contacts).
- In 1945, he was allegedly an agent of the French intelligence service, recruited agents, and organised negotiations with the OUN and the Austrian People's Party.

Historian Timothy Snyder notes that "Soviet legislation was retroactive and extraterritorial, stretching for decades before the formation of the Soviet Union and across lands over which Moscow never had sovereignty".

The charges against Roman Novosad were less extensive. They included alleged membership in the nationalist organisation Sich (in reality, a society of Ukrainian students in Vienna established in 1868), connections with Wilhelm and the OUN, and alleged cooperation with British and French intelligence services.

The indictment referenced articles from two separate criminal codes: the Penal Code of the Russian SFSR, applied by Soviet authorities in Vienna, and the Penal Code of the Ukrainian SSR, applied in Kyiv. Roman was charged with espionage and participation in a counter-revolutionary organisation; Wilhelm faced the same charges, along with "armed uprising or invasion for counter-revolutionary purposes on Soviet territory". These were various sections of the same "counter-revolutionary" articles—Article 54 in the Ukrainian Penal Code and Article 58 in the Russian version.

As was common with most "counter-revolutionary" cases of the time, the fate of Wilhelm and Novosad was decided not by a court, but by the Special Meeting of the Ministry of State Security (MGB), an extrajudicial body that delivered verdicts without defendants, witnesses, or legal representation. The decision was effectively made by the investigator Limarchenko, who signed the indictment and recommended the maximum punishment: 25 years of forced labour camps for both men. At the time, this was the harshest sentence available, as the Soviet Union had temporarily abolished the death penalty the previous year.

Limarchenko subsequently issued a ruling assigning both men to an MVD special camp. In July 1948, the Special Meeting upheld this recommendation, sentencing both Wilhelm and Roman to 25 years' imprisonment. However, while Novosad was sent to a labour camp, Wilhelm was ordered to serve his sentence in prison, which was considered significantly more severe. On 12 August 1948, Soviet authorities in Moscow determined that Wilhelm would be transferred to the infamous Vladimir Central Prison, a facility with special status.

Before the official announcement of the Special Meeting's decision could be delivered to Wilhelm, he was transferred from cell 17 of Lukyanivska Prison to the prison hospital on 1 July. He had complained of weakness, dizziness, coughing, and chest pain. Doctors diagnosed him with bilateral cavernous pulmonary tuberculosis in an advanced and contagious form. At 11 p.m. on 18 August 1948, Wilhelm Habsburg died from tuberculosis, having spent six weeks in hospital. Official documents do not record his burial location. It is assumed that he was interred in an unmarked grave, either in the prison courtyard or at the Lukyanivka Cemetery.

The Austrian government made formal inquiries about the fate of its citizen. In response, Soviet authorities provided only a certificate of Wilhelm's sentencing, concealing the fact of his death. Rumours circulated in Vienna that Wilhelm Habsburg-Lothringen had been seen alive in the Soviet Union. In 1952, the Austrian Republic declared that the passport issued to him in the 1930s had been granted illegally—on the grounds that he had not renounced his dynastic claim to the throne—and consequently revoked his citizenship.

=== Rehabilitation ===
During the period of perestroika in 1989, the Office of the Military Prosecutor of the Soviet Union fully rehabilitated both Wilhelm Habsburg and Roman Novosad. Novosad later became the author of the first publication about Wilhelm Habsburg in independent Ukraine; in 1992, his recollections were published in the magazine Ukrayina. By that time, the name of the Archduke had largely been forgotten.

In 1994, the declassified case files of Wilhelm and Novosad were transferred from the Security Service of Ukraine (SBU) Archive to the Central State Archive of Public Associations of Ukraine. In 2005, all personal documents and photographs related to Wilhelm, which had been preserved in his dossier, were handed over to Wilhelm's nephew and German citizen, Leo Habsburg-Lothringen, via the German Ambassador to Ukraine, Dietmar Stüdemann. Copies of the original documents were retained in the archive.

== Ancestry ==
Ancestors of Archduke Wilhelm of Austria

8. Archduke Charles, Duke of Teschen
4. Archduke Karl Ferdinand of Austria
9. Princess Henrietta of Nassau-Weilburg
2. Archduke Charles Stephen of Austria
10. Archduke Joseph, Palatine of Hungary
5. Archduchess Elisabeth Franziska of Austria
11. Duchess Maria Dorothea of Württemberg
1. Archduke Wilhelm of Austria
12. Leopold II, Grand Duke of Tuscany
6. Archduke Karl Salvator, Prince of Tuscany
13. Princess Marie Antoinette of the Two Sicilies
3. Archduchess Maria Theresia, Princess of Tuscany
14. Ferdinand II of the Two Sicilies
7. Princess Maria Immaculata of Bourbon-Two Sicilies
15. Maria Theresa of Austria
