= Lida Fleitmann Bloodgood =

American equestrian and author

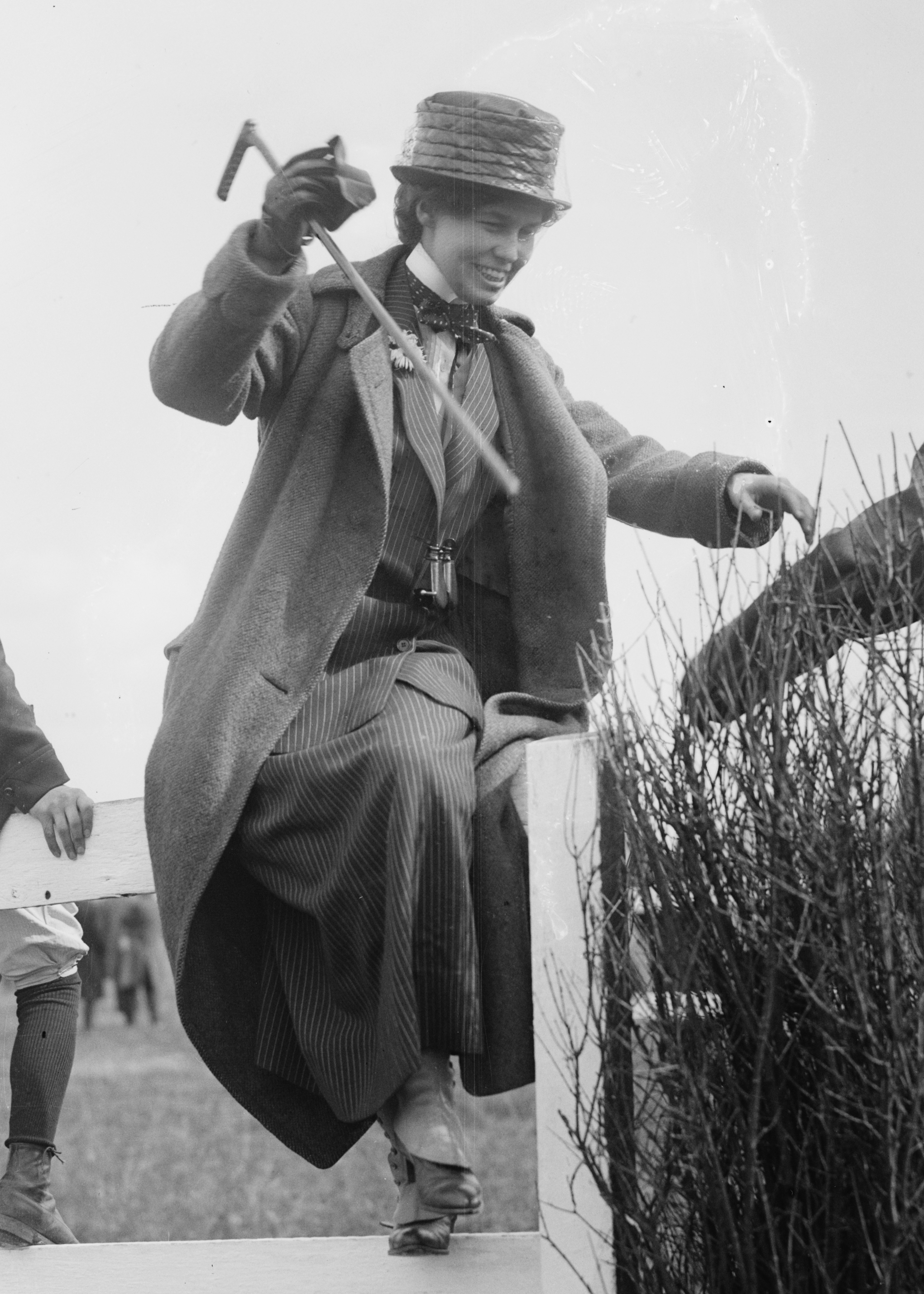
Lida Fleitmann in 1917

Lida Louise Fleitmann Bloodgood (1894–1982) was an American author and horsewoman in both America and Europe.

She was born as Lida Louise Fleitmann to William Medlicott Fleitmann (1859–1929) and Lida M. Heinze Fleitmann (sister of Copper King F. Augustus Heinze). On October 1, 1915, she received a double fracture of her right leg when her lightweight hunter, Cygnet, slipped and fell while they were competing at the Piping Rock Horse Show Association's thirteenth annual exhibition on the grounds of the Piping Rock Club in Locust Valley, New York.

In 1922, she married John Van Schaick Bloodgood. They were the parents of Lida Lacey Bloodgood, who married Polish Prince Dominik Rainer Radziwiłł.

She died in 1982. Her papers are archived at the National Sporting Library.

== Publications ==
- Comments on Hacks and Hunters (1921)
- The Horse in Art: From Primitive Times to the Present (1931)
- Hoofs in the Distance (1953)
- Saddle of Queens: History of Side Saddle (1959)
