= Balice, Lesser Poland Voivodeship =

Balice
- Wieś
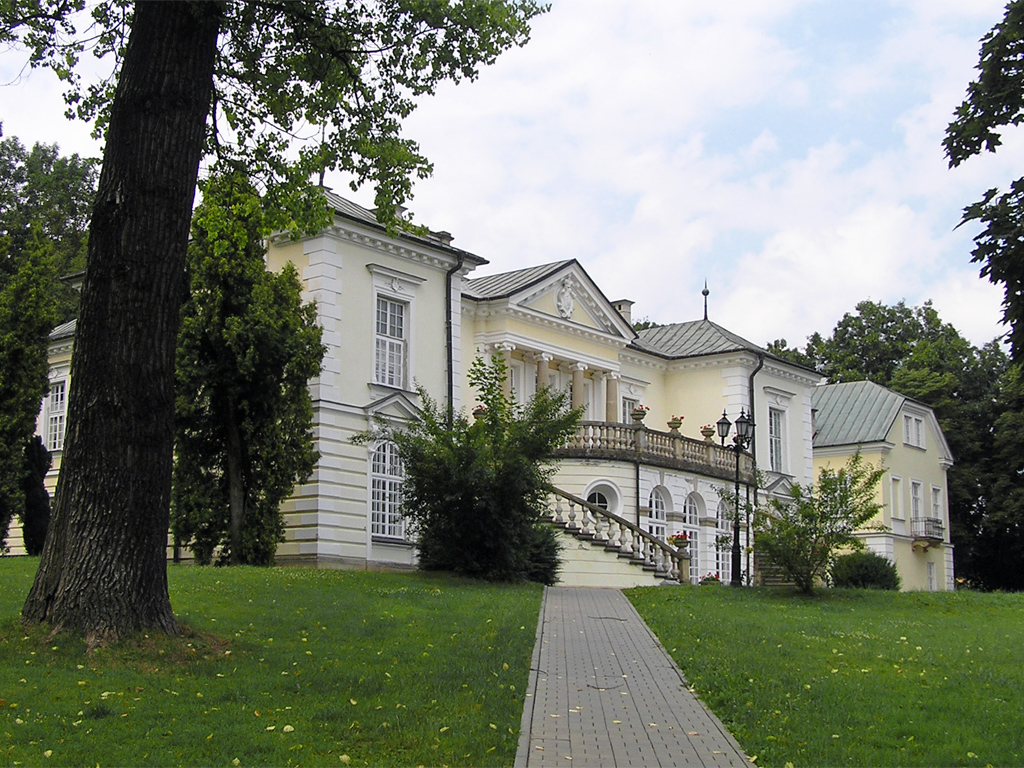
- Radziwiłł Palace in Balice

- Location within Poland
- Coordinates: 50°5′10″N 19°47′50″E
- Country: Poland
- Voivodeship: Lesser Poland
- County: Kraków
- Gmina: Zabierzów
- Population: 1,200

Balice [baˈlit͡sɛ] is a village in the administrative district of Gmina Zabierzów, within Kraków County, Lesser Poland Voivodeship, in southern Poland.

Balice is the home of the John Paul II International Airport.
