= Archduchess Maria Henrietta of Austria =

Archduchess Maria Henrietta
- Princess Gottfried von Hohenlohe-Schillingsfürst
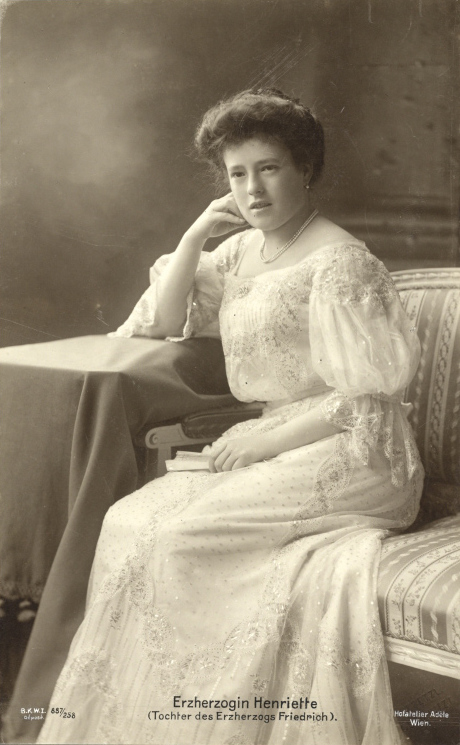
- Born: 10 January 1883; Preßburg, Austria-Hungary
- Died: 2 September 1956 (aged 73); Mariazell, Austria
- Spouse: Gottfried, Prince of Hohenlohe-Schillingsfürst (m. 1908; died 1932)
- Issue: Princess Elisabeth; Princess Natalie; Prince Friedrich
Names
- German: Maria Henrietta Caroline Gabriele von Österreich
- House: Habsburg-Lorraine
- Father: Archduke Friedrich, Duke of Teschen
- Mother: Princess Isabella of Croÿ

Archduchess Maria Henrietta, full German name: Maria Henrietta Caroline Gabriele, Erzherzogin von Österreich (10 January 1883 – 2 September 1956) was a member of the Teschen branch of the House of Habsburg-Lorraine and an Archduchess of Austria and Princess of Bohemia, Hungary, and Tuscany by birth. Through her marriage to Prince Gottfried Maximilian of Hohenlohe-Schillingsfürst, Maria Henrietta became a member of the House of Hohenlohe-Waldenburg-Schillingsfürst.

== Early life ==
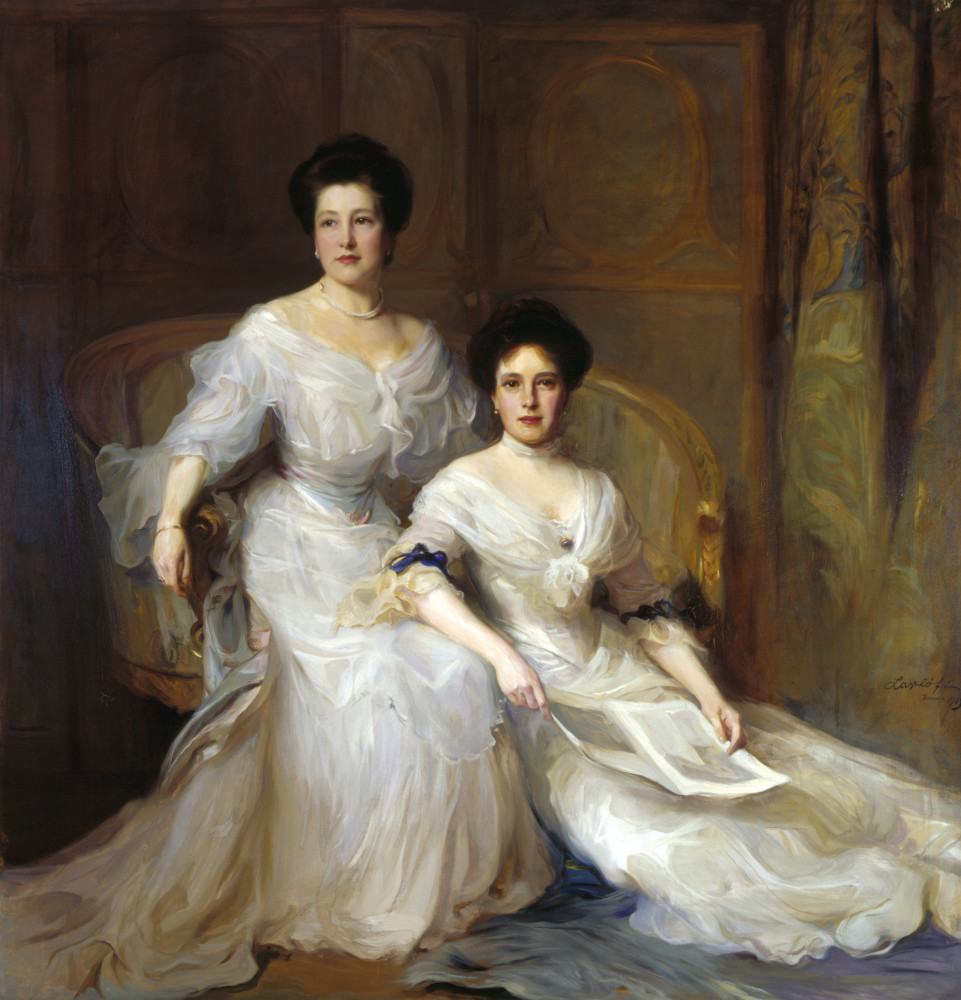
Portrait of Archduchess Henriette and her sister, Archduchess Maria-Anna, by Philip de László, 1905

Maria Henrietta was born on 10 January 1883 at Preßburg, Austria-Hungary. She was the third of nine children of Archduke Friedrich, Duke of Teschen and Princess Isabella of Croÿ. Among her siblings were Archduchess Maria Christina (who married Emanuel, Hereditary Prince of Salm-Salm), Archduchess Maria Anna (who married Elias, Duke of Parma), Archduchess Gabriele, Archduchess Isabella (who married Prince Georg of Bavaria), Archduchess Maria Alice (who married Baron Friedrich Waldbott von Bassenheim), and Albrecht Franz, Duke of Teschen. Her father served as Supreme Commander of the Imperial and Royal Armed Forces from 1914 to 1916.

Her paternal grandparents were Karl Ferdinand, Archduke of Austria and Archduchess Elisabeth Franziska of Austria. Her maternal grandparents were Rudolf, Duke of Croÿ, and Princess Natalie of Ligne.

== Personal life ==
On 3 June 1908 at Baden, Vienna, Austria, she married Prince Gottfried of Hohenlohe-Schillingsfürst, son of Prince Konstantin of Hohenlohe-Waldenburg-Schillingsfürst and Princess Marie Antoinette of Sayn-Wittgenstein-Berleburg. He later served as the Austro-Hungarian Ambassador to Germany. Together, they had three children:

- Princess Elisabeth of Hohenlohe-Waldenburg-Schillingsfürst (1909–1987)
- Princess Natalie of Hohenlohe-Waldenburg-Schillingsfürst (1911–1989)
- Prince Friedrich of Hohenlohe-Waldenburg-Schillingsfürst (1913–1945)

She died on 2 September 1956 at age 73 in Mariazell, Austria.

== Ancestry ==
Ancestors of Archduchess Maria Henrietta of Austria

8. Archduke Charles, Duke of Teschen
4. Archduke Karl Ferdinand of Austria
9. Princess Henrietta of Nassau-Weilburg
2. Archduke Friedrich, Duke of Teschen
10. Archduke Joseph, Palatine of Hungary
5. Archduchess Elisabeth Franziska of Austria
11. Duchess Maria Dorothea of Württemberg
1. Archduchess Maria Henrietta of Austria
12. Alfred, 10th Duke of Croÿ
6. Rudolf, 11th Duke of Croÿ
13. Princess Eleonore of Salm-Salm
3. Princess Isabella of Croÿ
14. Eugène, 8th Prince of Ligne
7. Princess Natalie of Ligne
15. Nathalie de Trazegnies
