= Frederick Baldwin Adams Jr. =

American librarian (1910–2001)

- Born: March 28, 1910; Greenwich, Connecticut
- Died: January 7, 2001 (aged 90); Chisseaux, Indre-et-Loire, France
- Education: St. Paul's School; Yale University; Corpus Christi College, Cambridge
- Known for: Bibliophile
- Board member of: Yale University Press, Pierpont Morgan Library
- Spouses: Ruth Potter (m. 1933; div. 1940) Betty Abbott (after 1941) Marie-Luise, Prinzessin von Croÿ (after 1969)
- Parent(s): Frederick Baldwin Adams; Ellen Walters Delano

Frederick Baldwin Adams Jr. (March 28, 1910 – January 7, 2001) was an American bibliophile and the director of the Pierpont Morgan Library in New York City from 1948 to 1969.

== Early life ==
Adams was born in Greenwich, Connecticut, on March 28, 1910, and grew up in the family home at 8 East 69th Street in Manhattan and at their country home on Campobello Island in New Brunswick. He was the son of Ellen Walters (née Delano) Adams (a first cousin of President Franklin Delano Roosevelt) and Frederick Baldwin Adams. Among his relatives were his sibling Laura Delano Adams (wife of Jack Eastman, Director of the Skowhegan School of Painting and Sculpture), and daughters Gillian Adams, and Ann Baldwin Adams. Among his large extended family was great-uncle were Henry Walters, the founder of the Walters Art Museum.

Adams attended St. Paul's School in Concord, New Hampshire, before graduating Phi Beta Kappa from Yale College in 1932, where he was a member of Skull and Bones. After Yale, he attended Corpus Christi College in Cambridge, England.

== Career ==
After Cambridge, he worked at the Air Reduction Company, a manufacturer of oxygen, acetylene, and other gasses and oxy-acetylene cutting and welding equipment, founded by his father and uncle, among others. At the company, he researched how New Deal legislation might affect the company.

From 1948 until 1969, he was director of the Pierpont Morgan Library in New York City, succeeding Morgan's longtime librarian Belle da Costa Greene. He served as president from 1959 to 1971, Governing Board 1952–, Yale University Press; Member, Yale Corporation, 1964–71; Yale University Council, 1949–58 and President of the New-York Historical Society. He was elected a Fellow of the American Academy of Arts and Sciences in 1954. He was president of the Grolier Club from 1947 to 1951.

After his third marriage in 1969, Adams resigned from the Morgan Library and moved to Paris with his wife after their marriage. There he served at president of the Association Internationale de Bibliophilie, the most prestigious organization of bibliophiles in the world, from 1974 to 1983.

His own collection, which included the largest holdings of works by Thomas Hardy and Robert Frost and an extensive collection of writing by Karl Marx, was dispersed at Sotheby's in London in November 2001.

== Personal life ==
On June 10, 1933, Adams was married to Ruth Potter at the Westminster Presbyterian Church in Buffalo, New York. Ruth, a writer and editor, was the daughter of Roderick Potter and Eleanor (née Hotchkiss) Potter, and the attendees at the wedding included Sara Delano Roosevelt, the president's mother. Before their divorce on August 5, 1940, they were the parents of Gillian Adams who married Jerry Thomas Bidlack, Kurt Heinzelman, and Warner Barnes and was a teacher at the Buxton School in Williamstown and editor and publisher of Children's Literature Abstracts for the International Federation of Library Associations. Their other daughter was Anne Baldwin Adams, who married Carl Avery Bross in 1959 and Durno Chambers Jr. in 1992.

In 1941, Adams remarried Betty Abbott, the daughter of Hunt Abbott of Wellesley, Massachusetts. Together, they were the parents of two more daughters: Judith Adams, and Lauren Adams, who married Hubert C. Fortmiller Jr. in 1967.

He married his third wife, the German aristocrat Princess Marie-Luise von Croÿ (b. 1919), on July 23, 1969. Marie-Luise was the daughter of Karl von Croÿ, 13th Duke of Croÿ, and the former Nancy Louise Leishman (daughter of John George Alexander Leishman, a Carnegie Steel executive who served as the United States Ambassador to Switzerland, Turkey, Germany and Italy). Her father was a nephew of Princess Isabella of Croÿ, wife of Archduke Friedrich, Duke of Teschen (who opposed her parents morganatic marriage in 1913) and Marie-Louise was married in 1941 (and divorced in 1949) from Richard E. Metz (son of Herman A. Metz), and widowed from Horatio Nelson Slater III.

He died on January 8, 2001, at his home in Chisseaux, Indre-et-Loire in France.

=== Honors ===
Adams was awarded honorary degrees from his alma mater Yale, Williams College, Union College, Hofstra University, and New York University.

== Publications ==
- Adams, Frederick Baldwin Jr. (1939). Radical literature in America. Exhibition held at the Grolier Club, New York City [Exhibition catalogue] (1 ed.). Stamford: Overbrook Press.
- Adams, Frederick Baldwin Jr. (1942). Elmer Adler: apostle of good taste. An address delivered January 21, 1941, on the occasion of an exhibition of the work of the Pynson printers. [Booklet] New York: Typophiles.
- Adams, Frederick Baldwin Jr. (1946). One hundred influential American books printed before 1900. Exhibition held at the Grolier Club, New York City, April 18 – June 16 1947 [Exhibition catalogue]. New York: Grolier Club.
- Adams, Frederick Baldwin Jr. and Randall, David A. (1953). The Sadleir Collection: addresses. Los Angeles: Friends of the UCLA Library.
- Adams, Frederick Baldwin Jr. (1963). To Russia with Frost. Boston, Massachusetts: Club of Odd Volumes.
- Adams, Frederick Baldwin Jr. (1968). 'Collecting for scholars' in Two Aspects of Memory. Northampton, Massachusetts: Friends of Smith College Library.
- Adams, Frederick Baldwin Jr. (1969) The Uses of Provenance. Berkeley: School of Librarianship, University of California. Zeitlin & Ver Brugge Lectures in Bibliography; John Howell Lectures in Bibliography.
