= Frederick Adams =

Frederick Adams may refer to:

- Fred A. Adams (1882–1941), American politician
- Frederick Baldwin Adams (1878–1961), American businessman and philanthropist
- Frederick Baldwin Adams Jr. (1910–2001), director of the Pierpont Morgan Library
- Frederick Upham Adams (1859–1921), inventor and author
- Frederick W. Adams (1786–1858), physician and author of theological books from Pawlet, Vermont
- Frederick Adams (boxer), British boxer
- Frederick Adams (philosopher), American philosopher
- Fred Adams (born 1961), American astrophysicist
- Freddie Adams, South African politician

== See also ==
- Frederick Adam (disambiguation)
