= Nancy Leishman =

American heiress married into Austrian aristocracy (1894–1983)

Nancy d'Oldenburg
- Born: Nancy Louise Leishman; October 2, 1894; Pittsburgh, Pennsylvania, U.S.
- Died: February 22, 1983 (aged 88); Copenhagen, Denmark
- Spouses: Karl, 13th Duke von Croÿ (m. 1913; div. 1922) Andreas d'Oldenburg (after 1922)
- Children: 3
- Parent(s): John George Alexander Leishman; Julia Crawford

Nancy Louise Leishman (October 2, 1894 – February 22, 1983) was an American heiress who married into the European aristocracy.

== Early life and relatives ==
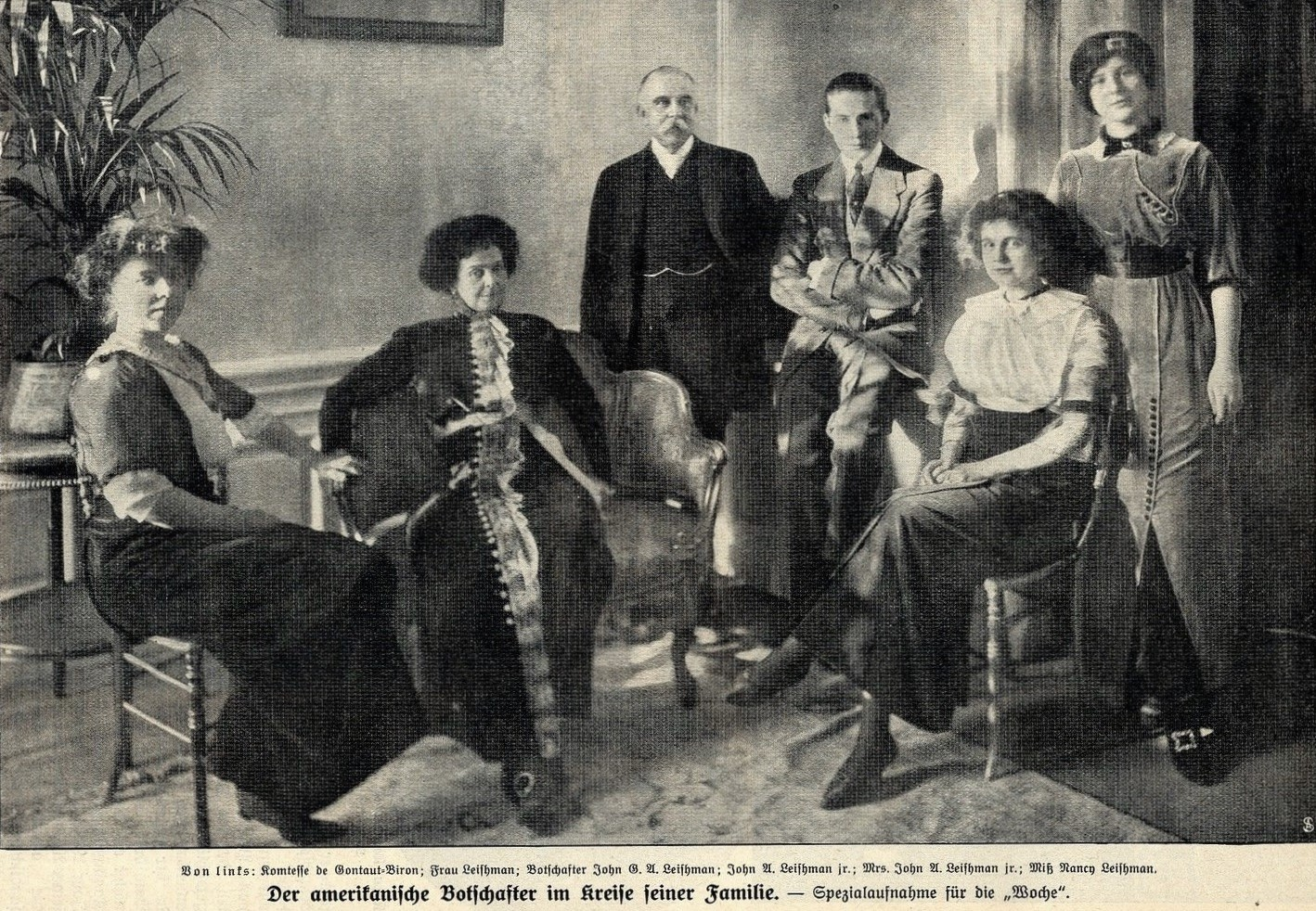
Ambassador Leishman and his family, c. 1912.

Nancy Louise Leishman was born in Pittsburgh, Pennsylvania, on October 2, 1894. She was the youngest of three children born to John George Alexander Leishman (1857–1924) and his wife, Julia Crawford (1864–1918). Her father, the son of Scots-Irish immigrants who eventually became the president of Carnegie Steel, served as the U.S. Ambassador to Switzerland, Turkey, Italy, and Germany during the administrations of U.S. Presidents William McKinley, William Howard Taft, and Woodrow Wilson.

Her sister, Marthe Leishman, a favorite of King George V and a close friend of Cole Porter and Francis Poulenc, married twice, first to Count Louis de Gontaut-Biron and, after his death, to American heir James Hazen Hyde. Her brother, John Leishman Jr., married, and divorced, New York socialite Elizabeth Helene Demarest.

Her paternal grandparents were John Leishman and Amelia (née Henderson) Leishman, and her maternal grandparents were Edward Crawford and Nancy Harriet (née Ferguson) Crawford.

== Marriages and children ==
While her father was serving as the American ambassador to Germany, Nancy met and fell in love with Karl (1889-1974), 13th Duke von Croÿ. (Note: Karl, 13th Duke von Croÿ (1899–1974) was a son of Karl Alfred, 12th Duke von Croÿ, and Princess Ludmilla von Arenberg (eldest daughter of Engelbert, 8th Duke of Arenberg). The Croÿ dynastic house, which originally adopted its name from the Château de Crouy-Saint-Pierre in French Picardy, claimed descent from the Hungarian Prince Marc (great-grandson of King Géza II of Hungary), who allegedly settled in France in 1147, where he married an heiress to the barony of Croÿ. The Croÿ family rose to prominence under the Dukes of Burgundy.) Since Nancy was a commoner (and an American) and Karl was a duke who ranked among the highest nobility of titled Europeans, the opposition to their marriage was enormous. Karl's aunt, Princess Isabella of Croÿ (wife of Archduke Friedrich, Duke of Teschen), was chief among the European nobility who vehemently protested the match, which led Kaiser Wilhelm II to refuse to give his official permission for their marriage. In July 1912, Karl's sister Princess Isabella Antonie of Croÿ had married Prince Franz of Bavaria (third son of Archduchess Maria Theresia and Ludwig III, the last King of Bavaria).

Nevertheless, Nancy and Karl married on 24 October 1913 at Versoix, Canton of Geneva, Switzerland. As a result of the impasse between the Kaiser and her father over her marriage to Croÿ, her father left his post in Berlin in 1913 and retired to private life. Before their divorce in 1922, (Note: After their divorce, Karl married another American, Helen Lewis, in 1924. They divorced in 1930, and he married, thirdly, Marie Louise Wiesner in 1933. They were the parents of Clemens Franz Carl Anslem Prinz von Croÿ (b. 1934). After her death in 1945, he married Hildegard von Guerard in 1949.) Nancy and Karl were the parents of:

- Carl Emmanuel, 14th Duke von Croÿ (1914–2011), who married Princess Gabriele, daughter of Crown Prince Rupprecht of Bavaria (eldest son of Ludwig III), in 1953.
- Princess Antoinette Emma Laurenzia Charlotte Ludmille Juliette Marthe Helene Sabina von Croÿ (b. 1915), who married Jurgen von Gorne in 1944. They divorced in 1947, and she married Frederick Nelson Tucker in 1948. They divorced in 1956, and she married Douglas Auff'm-Ordt in 1981.
- Princess Marie-Luise Natalie Engelberta Ludmilla Nancy Julie von Croÿ (b. 1919), who married Richard Metz, a son of Herman A. Metz, in 1941. They divorced in 1949, and she married H. Nelson Slater III in 1952. After his death in 1968, she married Frederick Baldwin Adams Jr., son of Frederick Baldwin Adams and Ellen (née Delano) Adams (a first cousin of President Franklin D. Roosevelt), in 1969.

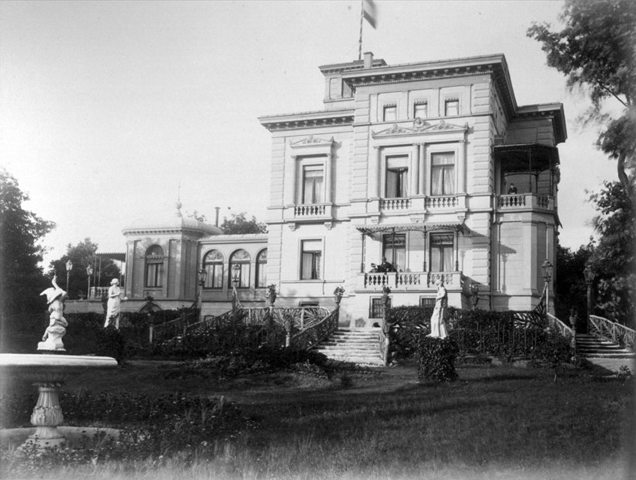
Villa Waldfriede, Wiesbaden, 1892

After the divorce, she lived for three years in the Villa Waldfriede in Wiesbaden. She married, secondly, Markus Andreas d'Oldenburg (1877–1939), a Danish diplomat and son of Valdemar Oldenburg. Regardless of the opposition to her first marriage, her son Carl was eventually deemed eligible to inherit the properties of the Croÿ family upon Karl's death in 1974, when Carl became the 14th Duke von Croÿ.

She died on 22 February 1983 at age 88 in Copenhagen, Denmark. Through her son Carl, 14th Duke von Croÿ, she was a grandmother of Rudolf, 15th Duke von Croÿ (b. 1955), who married Alexandra, a member of the Miloradović noble family.

== See also ==
- List of American heiresses
