= Prince Konstantin of Hohenlohe-Waldenburg-Schillingsfürst =

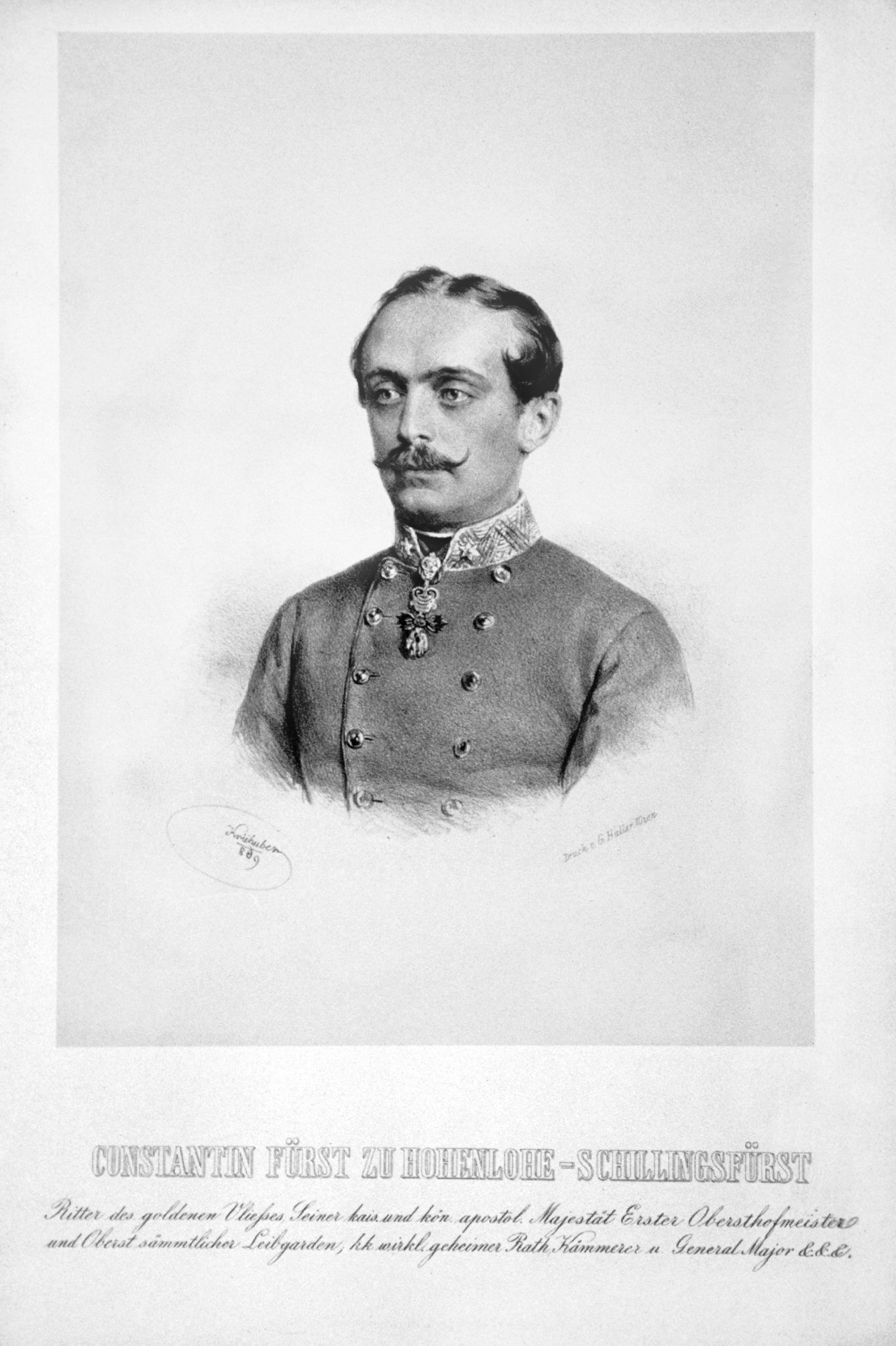
- Konstantin Hohenlohe-Schillingsfürst, Lithographie by Josef Kriehuber, c.1869
- Born: 8 September 1828; Wildeck, Hesse
- Died: 14 February 1896 (aged 67); Vienna, Austria-Hungary
- Spouse: Princess Marie zu Sayn-Wittgenstein
- Issue: Prince Konrad; Prince Gottfried
Names
- Konstantin Viktor Ernst Emil Karl Alexander Friedrich
- House: Hohenlohe-Schillingsfürst
- Father: Franz Joseph, 1st Prince of Hohenlohe-Schillingsfürst
- Mother: Princess Constanze of Hohenlohe-Langenburg

Prince Konstantin Viktor Ernst Emil Karl Alexander Friedrich zu Hohenlohe-Schillingsfürst (8 September 1828 – 14 February 1896) was a k.u.k. First Obersthofmeister (Lord High Steward or the chief of staff of the imperial and royal court) and General of the Cavalry of Austria-Hungary.

== Early life ==
Prince Konstantin of Hohenlohe-Schillingsfürst was the youngest son of Fürst Franz Joseph, 1st Prince of Hohenlohe-Schillingsfürst and his wife, Caroline Friederike Constanze of Hohenlohe-Langenburg (1792–1847). He had three older brothers who achieved high positions: Victor Herzog von Ratibor, President of the Prussian House of Lords, Chlodwig zu Hohenlohe-Schillingsfürst, Chancellor of Germany, and Gustav Adolf, Cardinal Prince of Hohenlohe-Schillingsfürst. In addition, he had three sisters and two other brothers died at a young age.

His paternal grandparents were Karl Albrecht II, 3rd Prince of Hohenlohe-Waldenburg-Schillingsfürst and Baroness Judith Reviczky de Revisnye (a daughter of Baron Johann Kazimir Reviczky de Revisnye). His maternal grandparents were Karl Ludwig, 3rd Prince of Hohenlohe-Langenburg and Countess Amalie Henriette of Solms-Baruth (the only child of Count Johann Christian II, Count of Solms-Baruth).

Hohenlohe went to school at the Maria-Magdalenen-Gymnasium, Breslau graduating with the Abitur in 1848.

== Career ==
In 1848, the same year he graduated from Gymnasium, he joined the military of the Austrian Empire and served in a campaign in Northern Italy in 1849. In 1854 he entered service at the Royal court in Vienna. He advanced becoming aide-de-camp of Emperor Franz Joseph I. in 1859 and First "Obersthofmeister" with the elevated appointment to "Fürst" in 1866. He was seen as the perfect courtier, always in agreement with the political views of the Emperor. As the highest court official, Hohenlohe had many administrative and representative duties and was at the centre of the political and cultural life at the Austrian Court. After the Ausgleich of 1867, the term k.u.k. was added to his title signifying that his duties were to both parts of Austria-Hungary.

=== Involvement at Hofburg ===
In 1857, Emperor Franz Joseph I of Austria issued the decree "I have resolved to command" (Es ist Mein Wille at Wikisource) ordering the demolition of the city walls and moats. In his decree, he laid out the exact size of the Ringstrasse, the new representative boulevard, as well as the geographical positions and functions of the new buildings. Hohenlohe was responsible for buildings and properties of the Royal Court along the Ringstrasse as well as the completion of the Hofoperntheater, and the new construction of the Hofburgtheater and of two new museums, the Kunsthistorisches Museum and the Naturhistorisches Museum. The construction of the Neue Burg at the Hofburg was not completed until the First World War. Hohenlohe participated in the development of the Wiener Prater where the World Exhibition took place in 1873. The Konstantinhügel in the Prater is named after him. Hohenlohe also oversaw work for the Vienna Danube regulation.

Hohenlohe worked until his death in 1896 and was succeeded by Rudolf von Liechtenstein.

== Personal life ==
On 15 October 1859, Konstantin married Princess Marie zu Sayn-Wittgenstein (1837–1920) at Weimar. She was the daughter of Fürstin Carolyne zu Sayn-Wittgenstein (1819–1887) who after her divorce lived with Franz Liszt since 1848 at Weimar. In 1861 he bought Palais Dobner-Dobenau in Vienna, and the couple moved in the following year. His wife became a sponsor of Vienna's cultural life and a supporter of its social institutions. The couple had six children:

- Prince Franz Joseph zu Hohenlohe-Schillingsfürst (1861–1871), who died young.
- Prince Konrad of Hohenlohe-Schillingsfürst (1863–1918), who became the Prime Minister of Austria (Cisleithania); he married Countess Franziska von Schönborn-Buchheim, a daughter of Erwein, 4th Count of Schönborn-Buchheim, and Countess Franziska von Trauttmansdorff-Weinsberg, in 1888.
- Prince Philipp zu Hohenlohe-Schillingsfürst (1864–1942), Pater Konstantin OSB
- Prince Gottfried zu Hohenlohe-Schillingsfürst (1867–1932), who became Austro-Hungarian Ambassador to Germany; he married Archduchess Maria Henrietta of Austria-Teschen, the daughter of Archduke Friedrich, Duke of Teschen and Princess Isabella of Croÿ, in 1908.
- Prince Wolfgang zu Hohenlohe-Schillingsfürst (1869–1883)
- Princess Dorothea zu Hohenlohe-Schillingsfürst (1872–1954)

Prince Konstantin died in Vienna on 14 February 1896.

== Honours and dedications ==
Orders and decorations

- House of Hohenlohe: Knight of the House Order of the Phoenix, 1st Class
- Bavaria:
  - Knight of Merit of the Bavarian Crown, 1858
  - Knight of St. Hubert, 1868
- Saxony:
  - Grand Cross of the Albert Order, 1866
  - Knight of the Rue Crown, 1880
- Württemberg:
  - Grand Cross of the Friedrich Order, 1866
  - Grand Cross of the Württemberg Crown, 1885
- Belgium: Grand Cordon of the Order of Leopold (civil), in Diamonds, 16 July 1867
- House of Hesse-Kassel: Knight of the Golden Lion, 19 October 1867
- Austria-Hungary:
  - Knight of the Golden Fleece, 1867
  - Grand Cross of St. Stephen, 1873
  - Marian Cross of the Teutonic Order
- Spain: Grand Cross of the Order of Charles III, 5 September 1868; with Collar, 27 November 1879
- (Saxe-Coburg and Gotha) (Duchy of Saxe-Altenburg) (Saxe-Meiningen) Ernestine duchies: Commander of the Saxe-Ernestine House Order, 1st Class, February 1859; Grand Cross, 1870
- Hesse and by Rhine: Grand Cross of the Ludwig Order, 1 November 1873
- Italy: Knight of the Annunciation, 6 February 1874
- Denmark: Knight of the Elephant, 16 November 1879
- Sweden-Norway: Knight of the Seraphim, 20 April 1885
- Saxe-Weimar-Eisenach: Grand Cross of the White Falcon, 1885
- Brazil: Grand Cross of the Southern Cross
- France: Grand Cross of the Legion of Honour
- Greece: Grand Cross of the Redeemer
- Holy See:
  - Grand Cross of the Order of Pope Pius IX
  - Knight of the Supreme Order of Christ
- Japan: Grand Cordon of the Rising Sun
- Johor: First Class of the Royal Family Order of Johor, 1893
- Sovereign Military Order of Malta: Bailiff Grand Cross of Honour and Devotion
- Mecklenburg: Grand Cross of the Wendish Crown
- Montenegro: Grand Cross of the Order of Prince Danilo I
- (Duchy of Nassau) House of Nassau-Weilburg: Knight of the Gold Lion of Nassau
- Ottoman Empire:
  - Order of Osmanieh, 1st Class
  - Order of the Medjidie, 1st Class
- Persia:
  - Order of the August Portrait, in Diamonds
  - Order of the Lion and the Sun, 1st Class
- Portugal: Grand Cross of the Tower and Sword
- Kingdom of Prussia:
  - Knight of the Prussian Crown, 2nd Class, 24 June 1864
  - Knight of the Black Eagle, in Diamonds, 8 August 1874
  - Knight of the Red Eagle, 1st Class
- Romania: Grand Cross of the Star of Romania
- Russia:
  - Knight of St. Andrew, in Diamonds
  - Knight of St. Alexander Nevsky
  - Knight of the White Eagle
  - Knight of St. Anna, 1st Class
  - Knight of St. Stanislaus, 1st Class
  - Knight of St. Vladimir, 4th Class
- Serbia:
  - Grand Cross of the Cross of Takovo
  - Grand Cross of the White Eagle
- Tuscany: Grand Cross of St. Joseph
- (Kingdom of the Two Sicilies) House of Bourbon-Two Sicilies:
  - Knight of St. Januarius
  - Commander of the Order of Francis I

Civil appointments

- Honorary member of the Gesellschaft der Musikfreunde, 1870
- Honorary Kurator of the Academy of Fine Arts Vienna, 1873
- Honorary Kurator of the Museum of Applied Arts, Vienna, 1873
- Member of the Herrenhaus of Austria

Johann Strauss Jr. dedicated his waltz Geschichten aus dem Wienerwald to Hohenlohe in 1868 and Anton Bruckner dedicated his Symphony No. 4 in E-flat major to him in 1873.

== Ancestry ==
Ancestors of Prince Konstantin of Hohenlohe-Waldenburg-Schillingsfürst

16. Philipp Ernst, 1st Prince of Hohenlohe-Waldenburg-Schillingsfürst
8. Karl Albrecht I, 2nd Prince of Hohenlohe-Waldenburg-Schillingsfürst
17. Countess Maria Anna of Oettingen-Wallerstein
4. Karl Albrecht II, 3rd Prince of Hohenlohe-Waldenburg-Schillingsfürst
18. Dominikus, Prince of Löwenstein-Wertheim-Rochefort
9. Princess Sophie of Löwenstein-Wertheim-Rochefort
19. Landgravine Christine of Hessen-Rheinfels-Rotenburg
2. Franz Joseph, 1st Prince of Hohenlohe-Schillingsfürst
20. Baron András Reviczky de Revisnye
10. Baron Johann Kazimir Reviczky de Revisnye
21. Julianna Nedeczky
5. Baroness Judith Reviczky de Revisnye
22. Baron Ádám Perényi de Perény
11. Baroness Rosalie Perényi de Perény
23. Erzsébet Fráter
1. Konstantin, Prince of Hohenlohe-Waldenburg-Schillingsfürst
24. Ludwig, 1st Prince of Hohenlohe-Langenburg
12. Christian Albrecht, 2nd Prince of Hohenlohe-Langenburg
25. Countess Eleonore of Nassau-Saarbrücken
6. Karl Ludwig, 3rd Prince of Hohenlohe-Langenburg
26. Friedrich Karl, Prince of Stolberg-Gedern
13. Countess Caroline of Stolberg-Gedern
27. Countess Luise of Nassau-Saarbrücken
3. Princess Constanze of Hohenlohe-Langenburg
28. Johann Karl, Count of Solms-Baruth
14. Johann Christian II, Count of Solms-Baruth
29. Countess Louise of Lippe-Biesterfeld
7. Countess Amalie Henriette of Solms-Baruth
30. Count Heinrich VI Reuss of Köstritz
15. Countess Friederike Reuss of Köstritz
31. Henrica Casado de Monteleone

== Literature ==
- "Hohenlohe-Schillingsfürst Konstantin Prinz zu". In: Österreichisches Biographisches Lexikon 1815–1950 (ÖBL). Vol. 2, Austrian Academy of Sciences, Vienna 1959, p. 393 f. (Direct links to "p. 393", "p. 394")
- Martina Winkelhofer-Thyri: Prinz Constantin zu Hohenlohe-Schillingsfürst (1828–1896). Der große Unbekannte am Wiener Hof. In: Alma Hannig, Martina Winkelhofer-Thyri (Hrsg.): Die Familie Hohenlohe. Eine europäische Dynastie im 19. und 20. Jahrhundert. Verlag Böhlau, Köln 2013, ISBN 978-3-41222201-7, S. 181–198.
