= John George Alexander Leishman =

American diplomat (1857–1924)

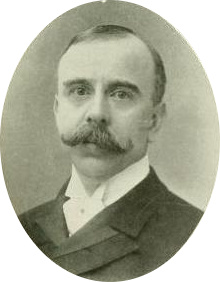
- Leishman in 1901

United States Ambassador to Switzerland
- In office June 9, 1897 – August 9, 1897
- Appointed by: William McKinley
- Preceded by: John L. Peak
- Succeeded by: Arthur S. Hardy

United States Ambassador to the Ottoman Empire
- In office 1901–1909
- Appointed by: William McKinley
- Preceded by: Oscar S. Straus
- Succeeded by: Oscar S. Straus

United States Ambassador to Italy
- In office July 4, 1909 – October 7, 1911
- Preceded by: Lloyd C. Griscom
- Succeeded by: Thomas J. O'Brien

United States Ambassador to Germany
- In office October 24, 1911 – October 4, 1913
- Appointed by: Woodrow Wilson
- President: William Howard Taft
- Preceded by: David Jayne Hill
- Succeeded by: James W. Gerard

Personal details
- Born: March 28, 1857 Pittsburgh, Pennsylvania, U.S.
- Died: March 27, 1924 (aged 66) Monte Carlo, Monaco
- Spouse: Julia Crawford (m. 1880; died 1918)
- Children: Martha Leishman; Nancy Louise Leishman; John G. A. Leishman Jr.
- Parent(s): John B. Leishman; Amelia Henderson Leishman

John George Alexander Leishman (March 28, 1857 – March 27, 1924) was an American businessman and diplomat. He worked in various executive positions at Carnegie Steel Company, rising to President, and later served as an ambassador for the United States to Switzerland, the Ottoman Empire, Italy, and Germany.

== Early life ==
John George Alexander Leishman was born in Pittsburgh, Pennsylvania, on March 28, 1857. He was the only son of Scots-Irish immigrants John B. Leishman (1827–1857) and Amelia Henderson (1832–1905).

His father drowned in the Allegheny River the same year in which he was born. Leishman began a lifetime of work at age ten, as an assistant for a Pittsburgh physician. Over the next seventeen years, Leishman would become a trusted confidant of both Henry Clay Frick and Andrew Carnegie.

== Career ==
=== Business ===
Prior to his entry into the Carnegie service, John Leishman had been in the service of Shoenberger Steel Company, as what was termed a "mud clerk". Mud clerks were the steel industry's representatives on the river wharf, responsible for tracking the shipping of goods: the arrival of raw materials and the departure of finished products. To ensure efficiency and success, mud clerks lived 24 hours a day in small sheds on the riverbank. This work led first to an unsuccessful venture as an independent steel broker and then a successful partnership with his friend and colleague from Shoenberger Steel, William Penn Snyder.

As senior partner in Leishman and Snyder, Leishman caught the attention of Andrew Carnegie, who convinced Leishman to enter Carnegie's service on October 1, 1884, as Special Sales Agent. Carnegie saw more than a little of himself in the younger man; throughout his life, Carnegie continued to think of Leishman as one of his "boys" and included Leishman in the official "History of the Carnegie Veterans Association". Leishman occupied the following positions: Vice Chairman, Carnegie Brothers & Company, Ltd.; Vice President and Treasurer, Carnegie Steel Company and President, Carnegie Steel Company.

Leishman’s social and business connections provided entrée into an extraordinarily exclusive circle of sixty-odd families, called the South Fork Fishing and Hunting Club. It was conceived as an idyllic summer colony, bought and developed by Henry Clay Frick in Cambria County, Pennsylvania, a short, convenient train ride away from the smoke and soot of Pittsburgh's industry. To create the summer colony, an abandoned Pennsylvania Railroad earthen dam was rebuilt and increased in size to create a mountaintop reservoir for pleasure boating, which was named Lake Conemaugh. Among the Club's members were Andrew Carnegie, Henry Clay Frick and Andrew Mellon. The Club's earthen dam failed on May 31, 1889, contributing to the Johnstown Flood disaster.

Many of the Pittsburgh members of the Club were hastily assembled in an ad hoc meeting and formed "The Pittsburgh Relief Committee." Two decisions were made at that meeting. One was to make immediate, generous and tangible gifts to help the flood relief efforts. The other was a pledge never to speak of the Club or the Flood in public or in private. All litigation was handled by attorneys Philander Knox and his partner James Hay Reed, of the firm Knox and Reed (now Reed Smith LLP), both of whom were themselves South Fork Fishing and Hunting Club members.

On July 23, 1892, Alexander Berkman, a self-proclaimed anarchist, sought to destroy Henry Clay Frick, the man Berkman blamed for the carnage of the Homestead steel strike in the preceding weeks. Armed with a pistol and a sharpened rat-tailed file, Berkman gained easy access to the headquarters of Carnegie Steel and found his way into the second floor private office of the chairman, 43-year-old Henry Clay Frick. Berkman forced his way into Frick's private office on the heels of a porter who had taken in his card. As Frick rose, Berkman fired at nearly point-blank range and struck Frick in the left earlobe, the bullet traveling through his neck and lodging into his back. After Frick fell, Berkman fired again and struck Frick in the neck. Leishman was in the office at the time and grabbed Berkman's arm to prevent a third shot. Frick was seriously wounded but rose and tackled Berkman, with the aid of Leishman. Frick was stabbed four times in the leg by Berkman before being subdued by employees. Frick survived.

Amid the growing rancor between Frick and Carnegie, Leishman attempted to steer a middle course. This was thwarted when Frick engaged a stratagem to orchestrate the ouster of the man who had saved his life from the presidency of Carnegie Steel, and his removal from the Western Pennsylvanian business scene. Frick alerted Carnegie to Leishman's speculation in the stock market, a practice that Carnegie engaged in freely, but abhorred in his subordinates. Frick worked behind the scenes, with Philander Knox to see that Leishman would be offered the post as ambassador to Switzerland.

=== Diplomatic ===
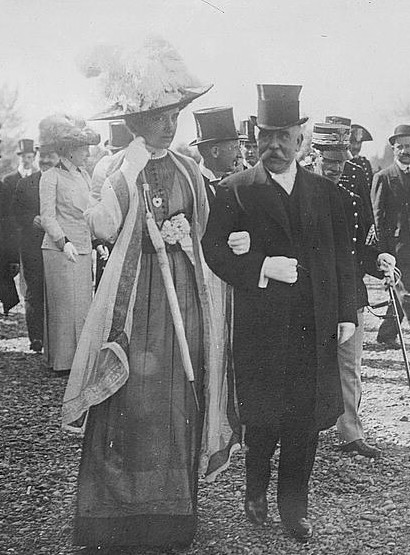
Ambassador Leishman with the Queen of Italy at an exhibition in Rome

Under pressure from both men, Leishman withdrew from Carnegie service in June 1897, to accept the appointment by President William McKinley as United States Ambassador to Switzerland. Thereafter, Leishman became United States Minister to the Ottoman Empire in 1900 (raised to Ambassador in 1906), United States Ambassador to Italy in 1909 and United States Ambassador to Germany in 1911.

Years later, as a board member of the Equitable Life Insurance Company, Frick used a similar scheme to arrange the removal of James Hazen Hyde (the founder's only son and heir) from the United States to France by seeking an appointment for him to become United States Ambassador to France. Unlike Leishman a decade before, Hyde rebuffed the offer. However, he did go to live in France, where he met and eventually married Leishman's eldest daughter, Marthe.

While serving in the Ottoman Empire, Leishman was instrumental in effecting the safe release of missionary Miss Ellen Stone as well as bringing about the purchase of the first overseas property to serve as a United States embassy, the Palazzo Corpi, bought first with his own money, reimbursed after he won a hand of poker. He also distinguished himself for diplomatic tact and dexterity in his negotiations with the Ottomans for full rights for American citizens and schools in that country, and in his pressing with equal success his insistence that the American minister should have access to the Sultan. His office was elevated to the rank of Extraordinary Ambassador and Plenipotentiary in 1906. While serving in Italy, Leishman purchased the much beloved and often reproduced painting called the Madonna of the Streets. The painting's current whereabouts is not known.

== Personal life ==
On September 9, 1880, at Homewood Chapel, Leishman married Julia Crawford (1864–1918), the daughter of Edward Crawford and Nancy Harriet (née Ferguson) Crawford of Pittsburgh. They were the parents of three children:

- Martha Leishman (1882–1944), who later styled herself Marthe, married first Count Louis de Gontaut-Biron on June 27, 1904. In Switzerland in 1898 she was painted by the Swiss-born American portrait painter Adolfo Müller-Ury. As the Countess de Gontaut-Biron, Marthe was a society hostess and couturier Coco Chanel's first aristocratic client. Marthe was a favorite of George V and a close personal friend of Mr. and Mrs. Cole Porter and Francis Poulenc. After the death of her husband in 1907, she married James Hazen Hyde in Paris on November 25, 1913. Hyde was the only son and heir of Henry Baldwin Hyde and the AXA Equitable Life Insurance Company fortune. Their son was Henry Baldwin Hyde of the Office of Strategic Services (OSS) in World War II.
- Nancy Louise Leishman (1894–1983), who married Karl Rudolf, 13th Duke of Croÿ (1899–1974), amid extensive newspaper coverage in Europe and the United States of a notoriety not to be surpassed until the romance between Wallis Simpson and Edward VIII, because Kaiser Wilhelm II refused to give his official permission for their marriage; Nancy, being a commoner and an American, was not considered a good match for the prince who ranked among the highest nobility of titled Europeans. Karl's aunt, the formidable Princess Isabella of Croÿ, wife of Archduke Friedrich, Duke of Teschen, was chief among the European nobility who vehemently protested the match. Nancy married secondly to Andreas d'Oldenberg, the Danish Ambassador to France.
- John G. A. Leishman Jr. (1887–1942), who married to New York socialite Elizabeth Helene Demarest, daughter of Warren G. Demarest. They divorced and she remarried to Lord Alastair Sutherland-Leveson-Gower (son of the 4th Duke of Sutherland), becoming the mother of Elizabeth Sutherland, 24th Countess of Sutherland.

Leishman's daughters made European marriages that were much talked of at the time. The American press considered these notably brilliant matches even among the many monied American young ladies (those "lovely trans-Atlantic invaders" as Edith Wharton called them) who found suitable titled European husbands in the pre-World War I marriage market. However, some titled Europeans felt that the Leishman girls had wed above their social station.

While serving abroad, the Leishmans were often in Paris, at Deauville, Monte Carlo, or in the Swiss or Italian lakes. Julia Leishman was instrumental in forming and serving as the first president of the Paris Skating Club; among her friends there was the Baroness Henri de Rothschild.

=== Later life ===
As a result of the impasse between himself and Kaiser Wilhelm II, which was created by his daughter Nancy's marriage to Karl von Croy, Leishman left Berlin and retired to private life in 1914. His wife Julia died in 1918 in Monte Carlo. He died on March 27, 1924, in Monte Carlo. They are buried in the Cimetière de Monaco.

Diplomatic posts
Preceded by John L. Peak	United States Ambassador to Switzerland; June 9, 1897 – August 9, 1897	Succeeded by Arthur S. Hardy
Preceded by Oscar S. Straus	United States Ambassador to Turkey; 1899 – 1909	Succeeded by Oscar S. Straus
Preceded by Lloyd C. Griscom	United States Ambassador to Italy; July 4, 1909 – October 7, 1911	Succeeded by Thomas J. O'Brien
Preceded by David Jayne Hill	United States Ambassador to Germany; October 24, 1911 – October 4, 1913	Succeeded by James W. Gerard
