= Roberto Ferruzzi =

Dalmatian Italian painter (1853–1934)

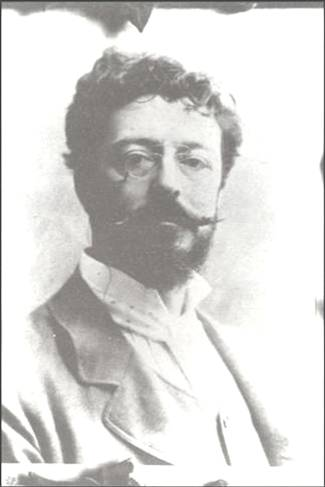
- Roberto Ferruzzi, around 1900
- Born: Roberto Ferruzzi; 16 December 1853; Sebenico, Kingdom of Dalmatia, Austrian Empire (now Šibenik, Croatia)
- Died: 16 February 1934 (aged 80); Venice, Kingdom of Italy
- Notable work: Madonnina

Roberto Ferruzzi (Italian: [roˈbɛrto ferˈruttsi]; 16 December 1853 – 16 February 1934) was a Dalmatian Italian artist. He is best known for the painting Madonnina that won the second Venice Biennale in 1897.

== Biography ==
Roberto Ferruzzi was born in Sebenico in Dalmatia (now Šibenik, Croatia) in 1853 to Italian parents. At the age of four he moved to Venice with his family. After the death of his father, a lawyer, he returned to Dalmatia to study classics. In 1868, he returned to Venice to enroll in the Liceo Marco Foscarini. He subsequently entered the University of Padua and graduated with a law degree. However, instead of practicing law, he gained vocation as a self-taught painter.

Afterwards, he moved to Luvigliano, a frazione of Torreglia, where he painted Madonnina in 1897.

Ferruzzi exhibited his work for the first time in 1883 in Turin, consisting mostly of figure paintings. In 1887, he exhibited a canvas in Venice titled La prima penitenza, a genre painting of a boy praying a rosary in penance for bad behavior whilst his grandmother looks on amused. In 1891–1892 at the Palermo exposition, his genre painting Hush! won an award. In 1897, he exhibited the Madonnina and Toward the Light in Venice.

Ferruzzi died on 16 February 1934 in Venice and was buried in the small cemetery of Luvigliano in his family's plot, near his wife Ester Sorgato and his daughter Mariska.

He bore two descendants of the same name: his son Roberto (nicknamed Bobo), a painter of lagoons; and his grandson Roberto (nicknamed Robi), an art appraiser and antiquarian.
