= Frederick Adam (disambiguation) =

Sir Frederick Adam (1781–1853) was a Scottish general.

Frederic(k) Adam may also refer to:

- Frédéric Adam (1904–1984), French musician
- Fred Adam, player in 1922 National Intercollegiate Basketball Tournament
- Freddy Adam (1931–2013), American racing driver

== See also ==
- Frederick Adams (disambiguation)
