= Madonnina (painting) =

Painting by Roberto Ferruzzi

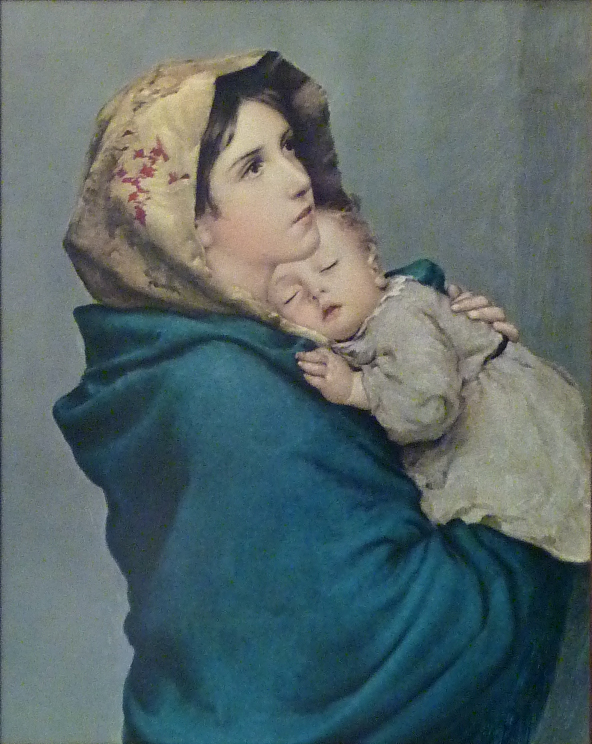
A reproduction of the Madonna of the Streets

The Madonnina, commonly known as the Madonna of the Streets (Italian: Madonna delle vie) or Madonna del riposo (Italian for 'Madonna of the Rest'), was a painting by Roberto Ferruzzi (1854–1934) that won the second Venice Biennale in 1897.

The models for this painting were 11-year-old Angelina Cian (Note: One source cites her first name as Angela, but this is probably incorrect. Cian was her maiden surname and her surname at the time of the painting's creation. She was later married to Antonio Bovo (with one source citing the surname as Boro, probably incorrectly).) and her younger brother. Although not originally a religious painting, it was popularized as an image of the Blessed Virgin Mary holding the Infant Jesus, and has become the most renowned of Ferruzzi's works.

The original piece is believed to have been a vertical Sepia painting in a gilt frame, approximately 27 cm (11 in) high and 21 cm (8.3 in) wide.

== Fate of the original painting ==
The original painting debuted at the Venice Biennale in 1897. John George Alexander Leishman, a steel entrepreneur and diplomat, who died in France in 1924, bought the painting but not its reproduction rights; he is the last known owner. It is possible that the original entered a private art collection in Pennsylvania in the 1950s, but its current location is unknown. An original oil painting entitled Madonna and Child from Florence was bequeathed to the Sisters of St. Casimir by a certain Dr. Edgar W. Crass in 1950, and bears a striking resemblance to the current prints of the missing La Madonnina by Ferruzzi.

A second possibility is that it was lost in the Atlantic Ocean on a voyage from Europe to the United States.

A claim that a version belonging to a religious group may be the original painting appeared recently, but openly admits it lacks support. Another version, possibly having belonged to an artist also surfaced, but has not been guaranteed as authentic by the dealer offering it.

== Popular usage ==
Although Feruzzi’s original has disappeared, it has not hindered the popularity and use of the image. Copies of the original are frequently featured on holy cards, framed portraits, and greeting cards. The belief it may still be found somewhere exists, and is estimated to worth US$18 million.

The following are several notable uses of the image:

- The Madonna of the Streets is featured as a mosaic in Sts. Peter and Paul Church, San Francisco, California.
- Members of the Sisters of Life receive a medal of the Madonna of the Streets at their first profession.

== Gallery ==
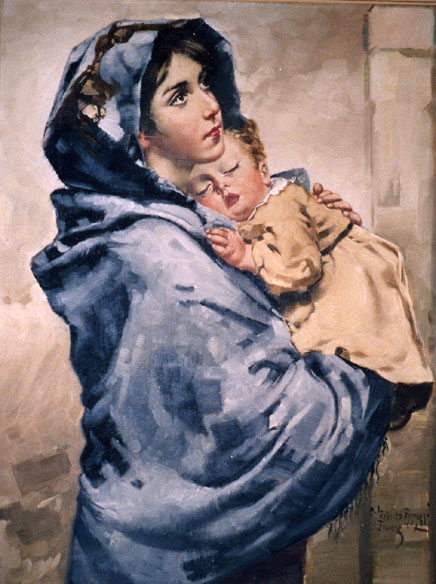

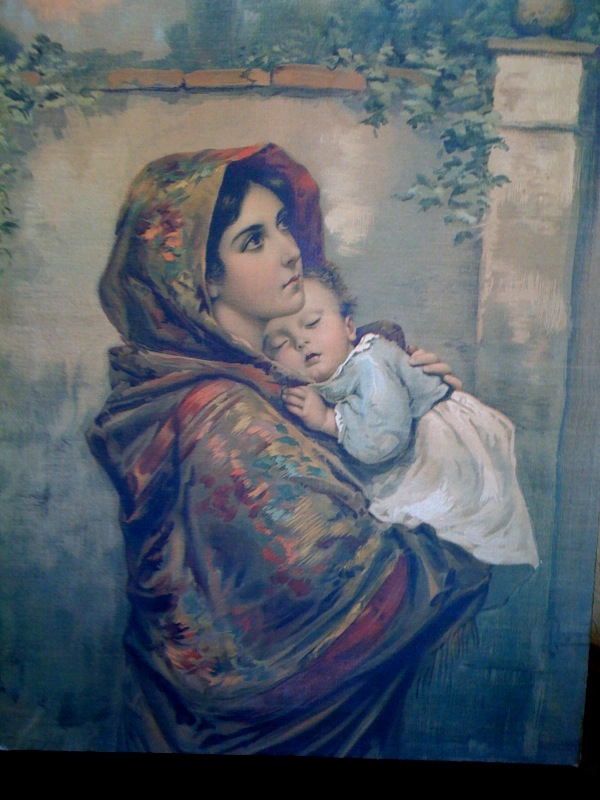

== See also ==
- Madonna della Strada
