= Prince Gottfried von Hohenlohe-Schillingsfürst =

Hungarian diplomat

Gottfried Prinz zu Hohenlohe-Waldenburg-Schillingfürst, Ratibor und Corvey
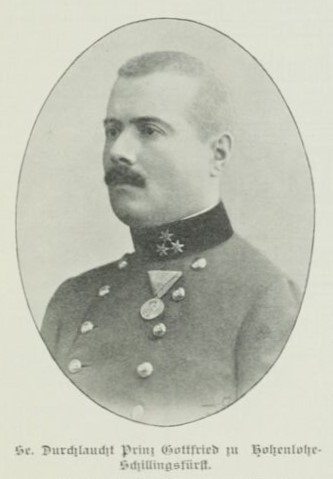
- Gottfried, 1903

Austro-Hungarian Ambassador to Germany
- In office 4 August 1914 – 11 November 1918
- Preceded by: Ladislaus Graf Szögyény-Marich von Magyar-Szögyén und Szolgaegyháza
- Succeeded by: None

Personal details
- Born: 8 November 1867 Vienna, Austria-Hungary (now Austria)
- Died: 7 November 1932 (aged 64) Vienna, Austria
- Spouse: Maria Henrietta, Archduchess of Austria (m. 1908)
- Children: Princess Elisabeth; Princess Natalie; Prince Friedrich
- Parent(s): Prince Konstantin of Hohenlohe-Waldenburg-Schillingsfürst; Princess Marie of Sayn-Wittgenstein-Berleburg

Gottfried (Maximilian Maria) Prinz zu Hohenlohe-Waldenburg-Schillingfürst, Ratibor und Corvey (8 November 1867 – 7 November 1932), was an Austro-Hungarian army officer and diplomat during World War I. He was the grandson of Princess Carolyne zu Sayn-Wittgenstein.

== Early life ==
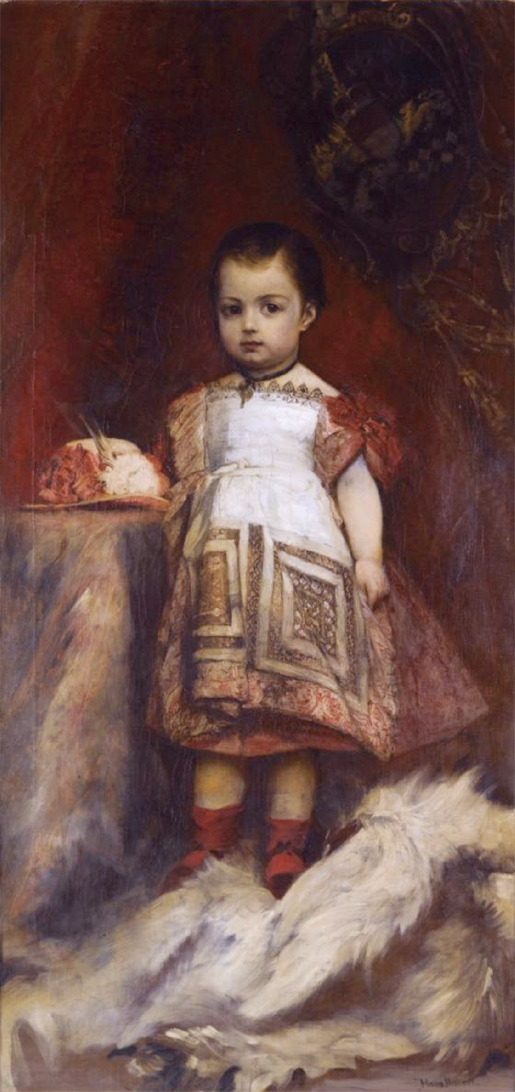
Gottfried as a child

Prince Hohenlohe-Schillingsfürst was born in Vienna on 8 November 1867 to Lord High Steward Prince Konstantin of Hohenlohe-Schillingsfürst (1828–1896) and was the brother of Konrad Prinz zu Hohenlohe-Schillingsfürst, who was Prime Minister of Austria in 1906 and who too would become Lord High Steward in 1917.

== Career ==
Following graduation from the Schottengymnasium in Vienna, Prince Hohenlohe-Schillingsfürst entered the army as a hussar in 1887. Promoted to lieutenant in 1889, he attended the War Academy from 1893 to 1895, followed by duty with the General Staff. In 1900, he was promoted to captain and was sent to St. Petersburg as military attaché in 1902. In 1906, he was promoted to the post of major, but retired the following year and transferred to the foreign service. However, he had to leave the service in 1908 due to his engagement with the Archduchess. On 2 February 1913, Emperor Franz Joseph I entrusted Prince Hohenlohe-Schillingsfürst with a special mission to St. Petersburg designed to alleviate the strained relations arising out of the Balkan crisis in the winter of 1912–1913. In April 1914, he re-entered the diplomatic corps while his wife had to renounce her style of 'Her Imperial and Royal Highness'.

On 4 August 1914, Emperor Franz Joseph I appointed Prince Hohenlohe-Schillingsfürst as ambassador of the Dual Monarchy at Berlin, replacing the ageing and decrepit Count von Szögyény-Marich, an appointment that had been discussed long before the advent of war but blocked by the latter's refusal to make a graceful exit. He was an ardent supporter of the Dual Alliance of 1879 and he sought to maintain the alliance on the basis of equality. The deteriorating military fortunes of the Dual Monarchy, however, hampered his endeavours in that regard. In 1917, he was convinced that military victory was out of reach and that a peace settlement had to be found as soon as possible; thus he supported the unsuccessful attempts of the new Emperor Karl I to bring about a separate peace.

Following the end of the war, Prince Hohenlohe-Schillingsfürst retired from public service and devoted his remaining years to horse racing.

In 1917, he had been promoted to the position of a major-general on the retired list. He was invested as a Knight of the Order of the Golden Fleece in 1917.

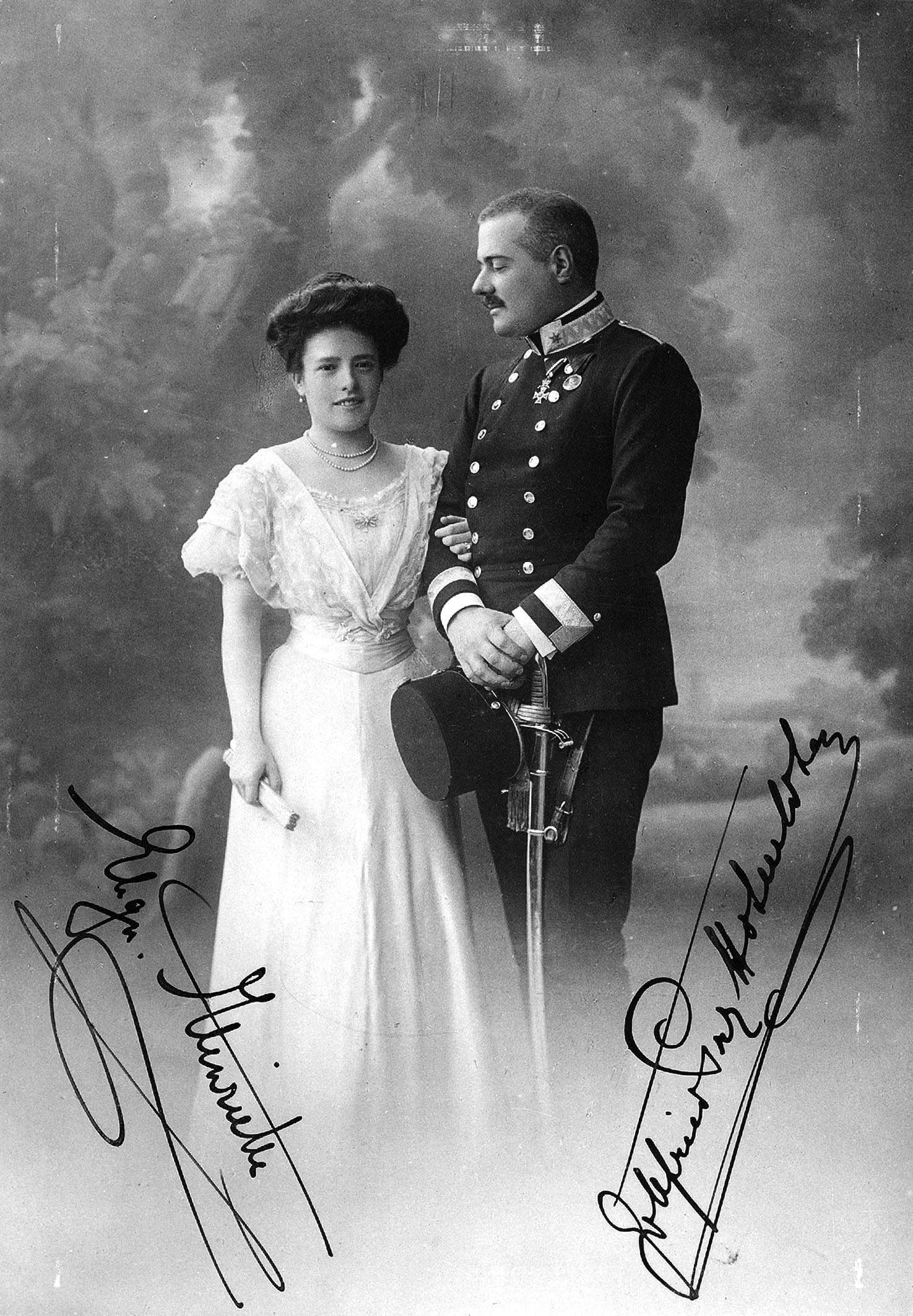
Gottfried zu Hohenlohe-Schillingsfürst and his wife Maria Henrietta, Archduchess of Austria (1908)

== Personal life ==
He married Archduchess Maria Henrietta, daughter of Archduke Friedrich who was the Supreme Commander of the Austro-Hungarian army during World War I, on 3 June 1908 in Baden bei Wien. They had three children.

- Princess Elisabeth of Hohenlohe-Waldenburg-Schillingsfürst (1909–1987)
- Princess Natalie of Hohenlohe-Waldenburg-Schillingsfürst (1911–1989)
- Prince Friedrich of Hohenlohe-Waldenburg-Schillingsfürst (1913–1945)

He died in Vienna on 7 November 1932.

== Ancestry ==
Ancestors of Prince Gottfried von Hohenlohe-Schillingsfürst

8. Charles Albert II, 3rd Prince of Hohenlohe-Waldenburg-Schillingsfürst
4. Franz Joseph, 1st Prince of Hohenlohe-Schillingsfürst
9. Baroness Judith Reviczky of Revisnye
2. Konstantin, Prince of Hohenlohe-Waldenburg-Schillingsfürst
10. Karl Ludwig, 3rd Prince of Hohenlohe-Langenburg
5. Princess Constanze of Hohenlohe-Langenburg
11. Countess Amalie Henriette of Solms-Baruth
1. Gottfried, Prince of Hohenlohe-Waldenburg-Schillingsfürst
12. Ludwig Adolf Peter, 1st Prince of Sayn-Wittgenstein-Berleburg-Ludwigsburg
6. Prince Nikolaus of Sayn-Wittgenstein-Berleburg-Ludwigsburg
13. Countess Antonia Cäcilie Snarska
3. Princess Marie of Sayn-Wittgenstein-Berleburg
14. Piotr Iwanowski
7. Carolyne Iwanowska
15. Paulina Podowska

Diplomatic posts
Preceded by Ladislaus Graf Szögyény-Marich von Magyar-Szögyén und Szolgaegyháza	Austro-Hungarian Ambassador to Germany; 1914–1918	Succeeded by None
