= Princess Isabella of Croÿ =

Archduchess Isabella
- Duchess of Teschen
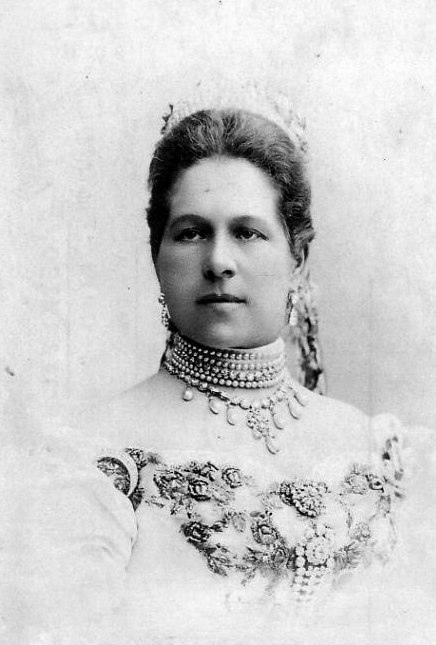
- Photo of Archduchess Isabella
- Born: 27 February 1856; Dülmen, Province of Westphalia, Kingdom of Prussia
- Died: 5 September 1931 (aged 75); Budapest, Hungary
- Burial: Imperial Crypt, Vienna
- Spouse: Archduke Friedrich, Duke of Teschen (m. 1878)
- Issue: Maria Christina, Hereditary Princess of Salm-Salm; Maria Anna, Princess of Bourbon-Parma; Maria Henrietta, Princess Gottfried of Hohenlohe-Waldenburg-Schillingfurst; Archduchess Natalie; Archduchess Stephanie; Archduchess Gabriella; Isabella, Princess Georg of Bavaria; Maria Alice, Baroness von Bassenheim; Archduke Albrecht Franz, Duke of Teschen
Names
- German: Isabella Hedwig Franziska Natalie
- House: Croÿ
- Father: Rudolf, 11th Duke of Croÿ
- Mother: Princess Natalie of Ligne
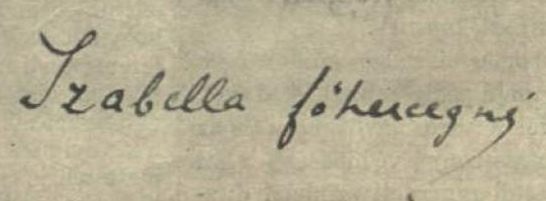
- Signature

Princess Isabella Hedwig Franziska Natalie of Croÿ (27 February 1856 – 5 September 1931) was by birth a member of the House of Croÿ and by marriage member of the House of Habsburg.

== Early life and family ==
Princess Isabella was daughter of Rudolf, 11th Duke of Croÿ and Princess Natalie of Ligne. Her paternal grandparents were Alfred, 10th Duke of Croÿ and Princess Eleonore of Salm-Salm. Her maternal grandparents were Eugène, 8th Prince of Ligne and Nathalie de Trazegnies.

== Marriage and issue ==
She married Archduke Friedrich, Duke of Teschen on 8 October 1878. They had eight daughters and one son:

- Maria Christina, Archduchess of Austria-Teschen (1879–1962), married Prince Emanuel of Salm-Salm;
- Maria Anna, Archduchess of Austria-Teschen (1882–1940), married Elias, Duke of Parma;
- Maria Henrietta, Archduchess of Austria-Teschen (1883–1956), married Prince Gottfried of Hohenlohe-Waldenburg-Schillingsfürst;
- Natalie Maria, Archduchess of Austria-Teschen (1884–1898);
- Stephanie Maria Isabelle, Archduchess of Austria-Teschen (1886–1890);
- Gabriele Maria Theresia, Archduchess of Austria-Teschen (1887–1954);
- Isabella, Archduchess of Austria-Teschen (1888–1973), married Prince Georg of Bavaria;
- Maria Alice, Archduchess of Austria-Teschen (1893–1962), married Baron Friedrich von Waldbott-Bassenheim (their daughter Countess Maria Immaculata Waldbott von Bassenheim was the second wife of Count Hans Heribert of Toerring-Jettenbach, son of Duchess Sophie Adelheid in Bavaria);
- Albrecht Franz, Archduke of Austria, Duke of Teschen (1897–1955).

== Archduke Franz Ferdinand ==
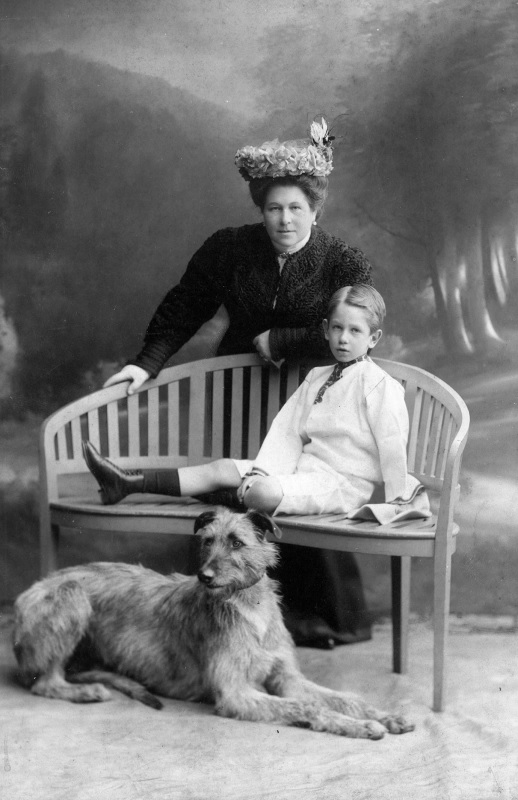
Isabelle with her son Albrecht Franz

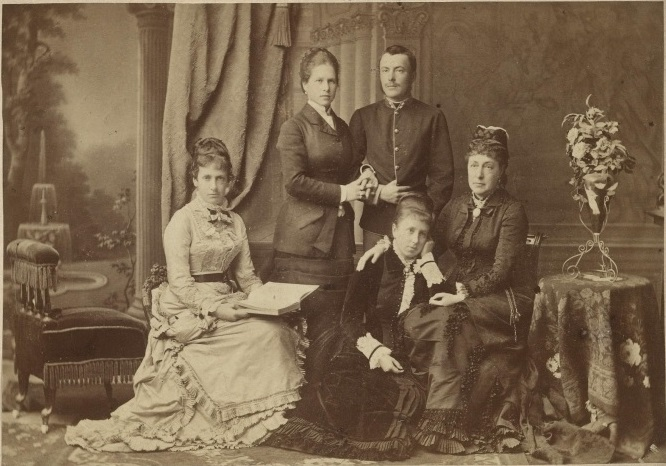
Isabella with her husband, her husband's mother Archduchess Elisabeth Franziska of Austria, and her husband's sisters Maria Christina of Austria and Archduchess Maria Theresa of Austria-Este

In the mid-1890s, the heir to the Austro-Hungarian throne, Archduke Franz Ferdinand of Austria began visiting Isabella and Friedrich's home. At first, it was assumed that he was there to court one of their many daughters. Eventually, it was discovered that in fact he was courting Countess Sophie Chotek von Wognin, lady-in-waiting to Archduchess Isabella and daughter of Austrian ambassador Bohuslav, Count Chotek of Chotkow and Wognin.

Isabella became infuriated that Franz Ferdinand had not singled out one of her eight daughters as his bride and future empress; as a result she engaged in a crusade to thwart the marriage of Franz Ferdinand and Sophie.

Sophie was dismissed from service, thus beginning an ongoing conflict between Friedrich and Franz Ferdinand, who married Sophie in 1900. The marriage was morganatic; Sophie was subjected to the indignities of a much lower rank at court than that of her husband, and none of their children could succeed to their father's dynastic honours—all chiefly as a result of Isabella's machinations.

A decade later, Isabella created a similar furore when her nephew, Karl, 13th Prince von Croÿ, sought to marry Nancy Leishman, the charming young daughter of John George Alexander Leishman, United States Ambassador to Germany, the former president of Carnegie Steel. The Archduchess felt that Nancy, being an American and a commoner, was not an appropriate spouse for a prince of Croÿ. Karl and Nancy were wed, nonetheless, and their grandson became the Duke of Croÿ.

== Death ==
Archduchess Isabella died on 5 September 1931 in Budapest, aged 75. Her body was buried, alongside her husband, in the church of St.Gotthard, Mosonmagyaróvár, Kingdom of Hungary.

== Honours ==
Isabella received the following awards:

- Grand Cross of the Imperial Austrian Order of Elizabeth, 1901 (Austria-Hungary)
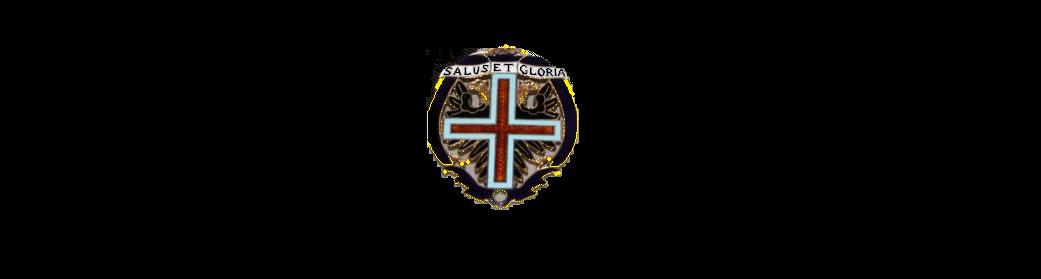
- Dame of the Dame of the Starry Cross, 1st Class (Austria-Hungary)
- Order of Merit of the Red Cross, 1st Class with War Decoration (Austria-Hungary)
- Dame Grand Cross of Honour and Devotion, with Distinction for Jerusalem (Sovereign Military Order of Malta)
- Order of the Sun, 2nd Class in Diamonds (Persia)
- Dame of the Order of Queen Maria Luisa, 30 August 1883 (Spain)
- Dame of Honour of the Order of Theresa (Kingdom of Bavaria)
- Dame of the Order of Saint Elizabeth (Kingdom of Bavaria)
- Grand Cross of the Royal Order of Civil Merit (Kingdom of Bulgaria)

== Ancestry ==
Ancestors of Princess Isabella of Croÿ

8. Auguste, 9th Duke of Croÿ
4. Alfred, 10th Duke of Croÿ
9. Anne-Victurnienne-Henriette de Rochechouart de Mortemart
2. Rudolf, 11th Duke of Croÿ
10. Konstantin, 3rd Prince of Salm-Salm
5. Princess Eleonore of Salm-Salm
11. Countess Maria Walburga von Sternberg-Manderscheid
1. Princess Isabella of Croÿ, Duchess of Teschen
12. Prince Louis-Eugène of Ligne
6. Eugène, 8th Prince of Ligne
13. Countess Louise van der Noot de Duras
3. Princess Natalie of Ligne
14. Marquis Georges de Trazegnies d'Ittre
7. Nathalie de Trazegnies
15. Countess Marie von Maldeghem
