= Chisseaux =

- Commune
- Coat of arms
- Location of Chisseaux
- Location within France Location within Centre-Val de Loire
- Coordinates: 47°20′00″N 1°05′00″E
- Country: France
- Region: Centre-Val de Loire
- Department: Indre-et-Loire
- Arrondissement: Loches
- Canton: Bléré

Government
  - Mayor (2020–2026): Franck Augias
- Area^{1}: 11.8 km^{2} (4.6 sq mi)
- Highest elevation: 136 m (446 ft)
- Lowest elevation: 54 m (177 ft)
- Population (2023): 610
  - Density: 52/km^{2} (130/sq mi)
- Time zone: UTC+01:00 (CET)
  - Summer (DST): UTC+02:00 (CEST)
- INSEE/Postal code: 37073 /37150
- ^{1} French Land Register data, which excludes lakes, ponds, glaciers > 1 km^{2} (0.386 sq mi or 247 acres) and river estuaries.

Chisseaux (French pronunciation: [ʃiso]) is a commune in the Indre-et-Loire department in central France.

== Population ==
Historical population
Year	Pop.	±% p.a.
1968	618	—
1975	612	−0.14%
1982	519	−2.33%
1990	522	+0.07%
1999	575	+1.08%
2007	621	+0.97%
2012	630	+0.29%
2017	598	−1.04%
2023	610	+0.33%
Source: INSEE

The inhabitants are called Chisseaussois in French.

== See also ==
- Communes of the Indre-et-Loire department
