= Prince Georg of Bavaria =

Bavarian prince (1880–1943)

His Royal Highness The Reverend Monsignor Prince Georg
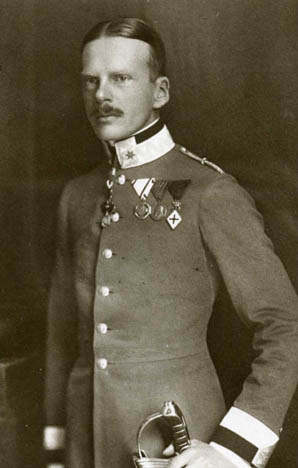
- Prince Georg in 1908
- Born: 2 April 1880; Munich, Bavaria, German Empire
- Died: 31 May 1943 (aged 63); Rome, Kingdom of Italy
- Burial place: Campo Santo Teutonico, Rome
- Spouse: Archduchess Isabella of Austria (m. 1912; ann. 1913)
- Parents: Prince Leopold of Bavaria (father); Archduchess Gisela of Austria (mother)
- Relatives: House of Wittelsbach

Prince Georg of Bavaria (German: Georg Franz Joseph Luitpold Maria Prinz von Bayern; 2 April 1880 – 31 May 1943) was a member of the Bavarian Royal House of Wittelsbach and a Catholic priest.

== Birth and family ==
Georg was born in Munich, Bavaria, the elder son of Prince Leopold of Bavaria and his wife Archduchess Gisela of Austria. The New York Times described him as the favourite grandson of both the Emperor Franz Joseph I of Austria and the Prince Regent Luitpold of Bavaria.

== Military career ==
Georg entered the Bavarian army as a Second Lieutenant (German: Leutnant) a day before his 17th birthday on 1 April 1897; he was assigned to Infanterie-Leib-Regiment. On 8 February 1903, he was promoted to the rank of First Lieutenant (German: Oberleutnant) and then reassigned to the 1st Royal Bavarian Heavy Cavalry "Prince Charles of Bavaria". Two years later, on 27 October 1905, he was promoted to Rittmeister, and on 26 October 1906 to Major. From 17 August 1908, he was also a Rittmeister and later Major in the 11th "Moravia" Austro-Hungarian Dragoons. While in the army, he became a champion boxer.

== Marriage ==
In December 1911, Georg became engaged to Archduchess Isabella of Austria (b. 17 November 1888 in Pressburg), daughter of Archduke Friedrich, Duke of Teschen, and his wife, Princess Isabella of Croy. The wedding took place on 10 February 1912, in the Mariä Vermählung (Marriage of the Virgin Mary) Chapel in the Schönbrunn Palace in Vienna, officiated by Cardinal Franz Nagl.

The couple honeymooned in Wales, Paris, and Algiers, but separated before the end of the honeymoon. There were several unsuccessful attempts at reconciliation. On 17 January 1913, the union was dissolved by the Royal Bavarian Supreme Court; on 5 March 1913, the union was annulled by the Holy See on the grounds of non-consummation.

== World War I ==
During World War I, Georg fought both on the Western Front (including the First Battle of Arras and the First Battle of Ypres) and on the Eastern Front. He started the war as commander of the Bavarian mechanized troops and eventually served under General Erich von Falkenhayn in Palestine. He was awarded both the I and II Class of the Iron Cross and on 14 December 1917 reached the rank of Colonel (German: Oberst).

== Ecclesiastical career ==
In 1919, Georg resigned his military commission and began studying theology in Innsbruck, Austria. He was ordained a Catholic priest on 19 March 1921, and shortly afterwards received a doctorate in canon law from the Catholic Faculty of Theology at the University of Innsbruck. He continued his religious studies in Rome and in 1925 graduated from the Pontifical Ecclesiastical Academy.

On 18 November 1926, Pope Pius XI named Georg a domestic prelate with the title Monsignor. In the 1930s, Georg was appointed a secular canon at St. Peter's Basilica in Rome. On 12 November 1941, Pope Pius XII named Georg a protonotary apostolic de numero participantium (one of the highest ranks of monsignor).

Throughout his time in Rome, Georg lived at Villa San Francesco with the Franciscan Brothers of Waldbreitbach. He maintained regular contact with his family, including his first cousin Crown Prince Rupprecht of Bavaria who moved to Rome in 1939. He was also in regular contact with other royal and princely houses; in 1930, he attended the Rome wedding of the Prince of Piedmont (later King Umberto II of Italy) to Princess Marie-José of Belgium, and in 1935, he attended the Rome wedding of Infante Jaime of Spain and Emmanuelle de Dampierre. In 1938, as grand prior of the Sacred Military Constantinian Order of Saint George he arranged the transfer of the remains of King Francis II of the Two Sicilies and of his wife Queen Maria Sophie from Schloss Tegernsee in Bavaria to the Chiesa del Santo Spirito in Rome.

On 31 May 1943, Georg died at Villa San Francesco. One source says that he had been ill for some time. Another source says that he died unexpectedly of tuberculosis contracted while working at a hospital. He is buried in the Campo Santo Teutonico, the German cemetery immediately outside the walls of Vatican City. In his will, he left money to pay for new bronze doors for St. Peter's Basilica; these include the "Door of the Dead" by Giacomo Manzù and the "Door of the Sacraments" by Venanzo Crocetti.

== Greek succession ==
A few writers (e.g. Martha Schad) maintain that after the death of his father in 1930, Georg became the successor to the Greek rights of his great-uncle King Otto of Greece who was deposed in 1862. Georg's uncle Ludwig and his descendants were more senior, but Ludwig had renounced his Greek rights in 1869. However, the Greek Constitution of 1844 required that the successor of King Otto "shall profess the Greek Orthodox religion."

== Honours ==
Prince Georg was President of the Royal Automobile Club of Bavaria (Königlich Bayerischer Automobil-Club). In 1911 he became Protector of the Bavarian branch of the German Navy League. In 1929 he became a member of the Archconfraternity of the Suffering Mother of God in the Campo Santo Teutonico.

Among his military honours, he was appointed à la suite of the Royal Bavarian 1st Heavy Cavalry Regiment (Königlich Bayerisches 1. Schwere-Reiter-Regiment „Prinz Karl von Bayern“) and the Royal Bavarian Infantry Life Guards Regiment (Königlich Bayerisches Infanterie-Leib Regiment).

In 1933 a portrait bust of Georg was sculpted by Arno Breker.

== Orders and decorations ==
=== German states ===
- Kingdom of Bavaria:
  - Order of Saint Hubert (1898)
  - Order of Saint George, Grand Prior (1902)
  - Military Merit Order, 4th Class with Crown and Swords (28 September 1914, returned upon receipt of higher class)
  - Military Merit Order, 3rd Class with Swords (28 May 1917, returned upon receipt of higher class)
  - Military Merit Order, 3rd Class with Crown and Swords (15 April 1918, not returned, as Bavarian regulations allowed wear of the 3rd class with the officer's cross)
  - Military Merit Order, Officer's Cross with Swords (8 November 1918)
  - Jubilee Medal for the Bavarian Army
- Grand Duchy of Baden: House Order of Fidelity
- Duchy of Brunswick:
  - Order of Henry the Lion, Grand Cross
  - War Merit Cross 2nd Class
- Hohenzollern principalities:
  - Princely House Order of Hohenzollern, Honor Cross 1st Class
  - Swords to the Honor Cross 1st Class (1923)
- Kingdom of Prussia:
  - Order of the Black Eagle (1910)
  - Iron Cross 1st Class
  - Iron Cross 2nd Class (13 October 1914)
  - Cross of the Mount of Olives
- (Saxe-Coburg and Gotha) (Duchy of Saxe-Altenburg) (Saxe-Meiningen) Saxon duchies: Ducal Saxe-Ernestine House Order, Grand Cross (1907)
- Kingdom of Württemberg: Order of the Württemberg Crown, Grand Cross

=== Foreign states ===
- (Austrian Empire) (Kingdom of Hungary) Austria-Hungary:
  - Order of the Golden Fleece (1900)
  - Royal Hungarian Order of St. Stephen, Grand Cross (1912)
  - Order of the Iron Crown, 3rd Class with War Decoration (6 June 1916)
  - Military Merit Cross, 3rd Class with War Decoration
  - Military Jubilee Cross
- Principality of Bulgaria: Order of Saint Alexander, Grand Cross (1908)
- (Qing dynasty) Empire of China: Order of the Double Dragon, 1st Class, 2nd Grade (1903)
- Italy and Italian states:
  - (Kingdom of the Two Sicilies) Two Sicilies: Constantinian Order of St. George, Bailiff Grand Cross of Justice with Collar
  - Grand Duchy of Tuscany: Order of Saint Joseph, Grand Cross (1901)
- Empire of Japan: Order of the Chrysanthemum, Grand Cordon (16 May 1905)
- Korean Empire: Order of the Plum Blossom, Grand Cordon (1903)
- Kingdom of Montenegro: Order of Prince Danilo I, Grand Cross
- Ottoman Empire:
  - Order of Glory, Grand Cordon (1908)
  - Liakat Medal in Gold with Sabers
  - War Medal
- Papal States: Order of the Holy Sepulchre, Grand Cross
- Kingdom of Portugal: Military Order of the Tower and Sword, Grand Cross (1906)
- Kingdom of Romania: Order of the Star of Romania, Grand Cross with Swords (1902)
- Kingdom of Siam (Thailand): Order of the Royal House of Chakri (15 November 1906)
- Spain:
  - Order of Charles III, Knight Grand Cross
  - Cross of the Military Knightly Order of Our Lady of Montesa (1907)
- United Kingdom: Royal Victorian Order, Honorary Grand Cross (21 August 1908)

== Ancestry ==
Ancestors of Prince Georg of Bavaria

16. Maximilian I Joseph of Bavaria
8. Ludwig I of Bavaria
17. Princess Augusta Wilhelmine of Hesse-Darmstadt
4. Luitpold, Prince Regent of Bavaria
18. Frederick, Duke of Saxe-Altenburg
9. Princess Therese of Saxe-Hildburghausen
19. Duchess Charlotte Georgine of Mecklenburg-Strelitz
2. Prince Leopold of Bavaria
20. Ferdinand III, Grand Duke of Tuscany
10. Leopold II, Grand Duke of Tuscany
21. Princess Luisa of Naples and Sicily
5. Archduchess Auguste Ferdinande of Austria
22. Maximilian, Hereditary Prince of Saxony
11. Princess Maria Anna of Saxony
23. Princess Carolina of Parma
1. Prince Georg of Bavaria
24. Francis II, Holy Roman Emperor
12. Archduke Franz Karl of Austria
25. Princess Maria Theresa of Naples and Sicily
6. Franz Joseph I of Austria
26. Maximilian I Joseph of Bavaria (= 16)
13. Princess Sophie of Bavaria
27. Princess Caroline of Baden
3. Archduchess Gisela of Austria
28. Duke Pius August in Bavaria
14. Duke Maximilian Joseph in Bavaria
29. Princess Amélie Louise of Arenberg
7. Duchess Elisabeth in Bavaria
30. Maximilian I Joseph of Bavaria (= 16, 26)
15. Princess Ludovika of Bavaria
31. Princess Caroline of Baden (= 27)

== Bibliography ==
- Marriage. Wiener Zeitung, February 11, 1912, p. 1.
- "The Austro-Bavarian Marriage", The Times, February 10, 1912, p. 5.
- "The Austro-Bavarian Marriage", The Times, February 12, 1912, p. 5.
- "Prince and Bride Part", New York Times, September 20, 1912, p. 4.
- "Prince's Marriage Voided", New York Times, October 7, 1912, p. 1.
- "Won't Annul Marriage", New York Times, October 12, 1912, p. 4.
- "Princess Seeks Divorce", New York Times, November 5, 1912, p. 8.
- "Royal Marriage Has Been Dissolved", New York Times, January 18, 1913, p. 3.
- "Prince George of Bavaria", The Times, January 18, 1913, p. 5.
- "Dissolution of a Royal Marriage", The Times, April 28, 1913, p. 5.
- "Mgr. Prince George of Bavaria Was 63". New York Times, June 2, 1943, p. 25.
- Schad, Martha. Kaiserin Elisabeth und ihre Töchter. München: Langen Müller, 1998.
