= Archduke Albrecht Franz, Duke of Teschen =

Archduke Albrecht Franz
- Duke of Teschen
- Born: 24 July 1897; Vienna, Austria-Hungary
- Died: 23 July 1955 (aged 57); Buenos Aires, Argentina
- Spouse: Irene Dora Lelbach (m. 1930; div. 1937) Katalin Bocskay de Felsö-Bánya (m. 1938; div. 1951) Lydia Strauss-Dorner (m. 1951)
- Issue: Charlotte, Countess von Habsburg; Ildiko, Countess von Habsburg; Rudolf, Count von Habsburg
- House: Habsburg-Lorraine
- Father: Archduke Friedrich, Duke of Teschen
- Mother: Princess Isabella of Croÿ

Albert Franz Josef Karl Friedrich Georg Hubert Maria, Archduke of Austria, Prince Royal of Hungary and Bohemia, Duke of Teschen (In German: Erzherzog Albrecht Franz Josef Karl Friedrich Georg Hubert Maria von Österreich, Herzog von Teschen) – (24 July 1897 – 23 July 1955) was a member of the House of Habsburg and titular pretender to the Duchy of Teschen.

== Early life ==
Archduke Albrecht Franz was born in Vienna, Austria-Hungary, only son of Archduke Friedrich, Duke of Teschen (1856–1936, son of Archduke Karl Ferdinand of Austria and Archduchess Elisabeth Franziska of Austria) and his wife, Princess Isabella of Croÿ (1856–1931, daughter of Rudolf, Duke of Croÿ and Princess Natalie of Ligne). He had eight elder sisters and was the youngest child of the family.

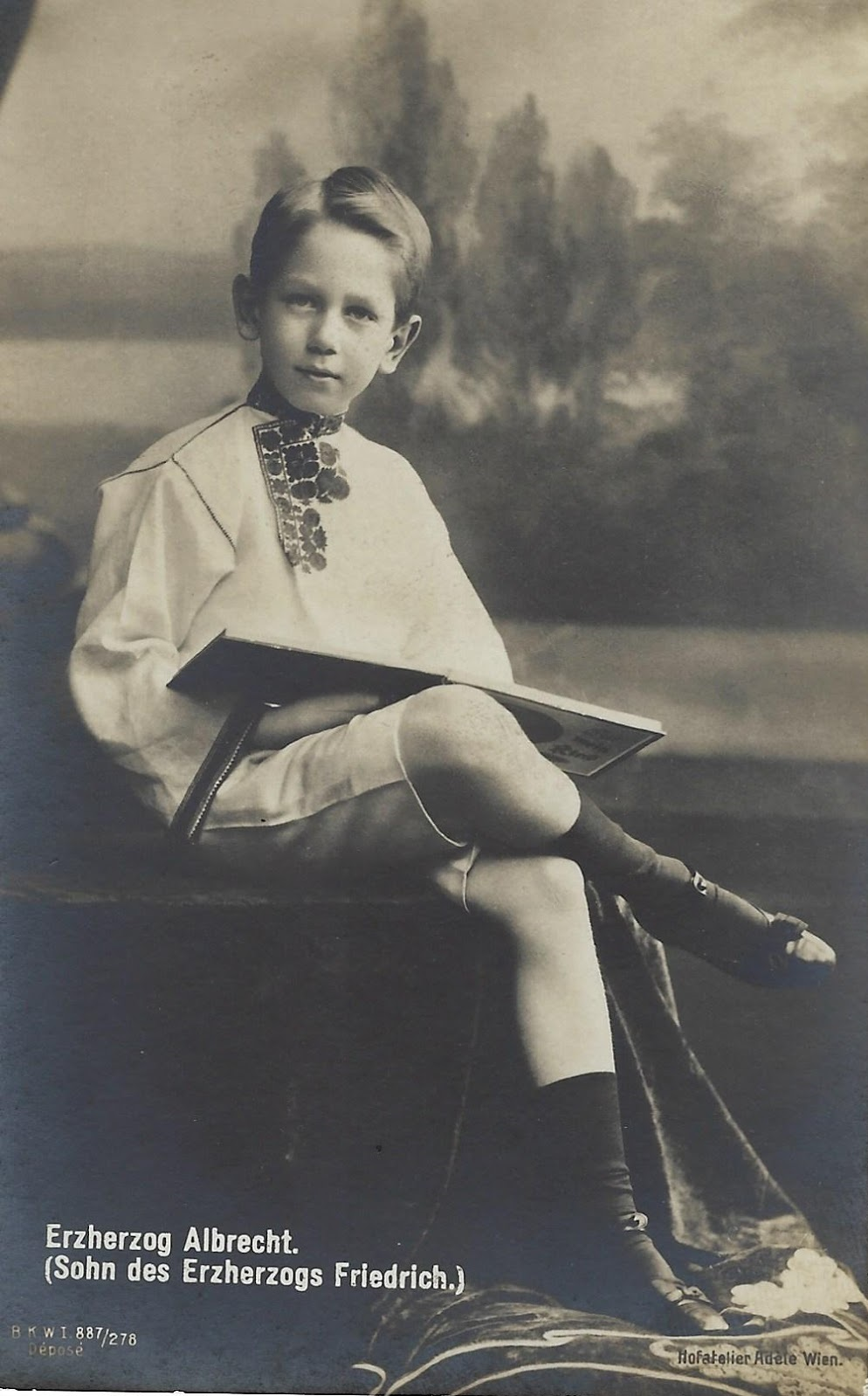
Albrecht Franz, c. 1906

== Marriages ==
On 16 August 1930 Albrecht Franz married morganatically in Brighton, England, Irene Dora Lelbach (1897–1985), daughter of Johann Lelbach and Ilma Skultéty de Alsólehota. They had no issue. They divorced on 1 June 1937.

His second marriage was to Katalin Bocskay de Felsö-Bánya (1909–2000), on 7 May 1938. They had two daughters, named below. Following the rules of morganatic marriages, the daughters did not inherit the title of their father, in this case that of Archduchess; however, Otto von Habsburg granted them the title of Gräfin von Habsburg ("Countess of Habsburg") in addition to their legal titles at birth of "magyar királyi hercegnő" ("Royal Princess of Hungary") Albrecht and Katalin divorced in 1951.

- Charlotte Izabella Mária Krisztine Eszter Katalin Pia, Countess von Habsburg, Princess of Hungary (1940–2020)
- Ildiko Katalin Izabella Henriette Alice Mária, Countess von Habsburg, Princess of Hungary (born 1942)

His third marriage was to Lydia Strauss-Dorner, daughter of Karl Hans Beltram "Bela" Strauss-Dorner and Minka "Mici" or "Mitzy" Ellen Clarissa Schey von Koromla. Their son was Rudolf Stefan von Habsburg (1951–1992).

== Ancestry ==
Ancestors of Archduke Albrecht Franz, Duke of Teschen

8. Archduke Charles, Duke of Teschen
4. Archduke Karl Ferdinand of Austria
9. Princess Henrietta of Nassau-Weilburg
2. Archduke Friedrich, Duke of Teschen
10. Archduke Joseph, Palatine of Hungary
5. Archduchess Elisabeth Franziska of Austria
11. Duchess Maria Dorothea of Württemberg
1. Archduke Albrecht Franz, Duke of Teschen
12. Alfred, 10th Duke of Croÿ
6. Rudolf, 11th Duke of Croÿ
13. Princess Eleonore of Salm-Salm
3. Princess Isabella of Croÿ
14. Eugène, 8th Prince of Ligne
7. Princess Natalie of Ligne
15. Nathalie de Trazegnies

== Bibliography ==
- Heiszler, Vilmos. Photo Habsburg: Frederick Habsburg and his Family. Budapest: Corvina, 1989.
- Palmer, Alan. Twilight of the Habsburgs: The Life and Times of Emperor Francis Joseph. Atlantic Monthly Press; 1st Pbk. Ed edition.

Archduke Albrecht Franz, Duke of Teschen House of Habsburg-Lorraine Cadet branch of the House of Lorraine Born: 24 July 1897 Died: 23 July 1955
Titles in pretence
Preceded by Archduke Friedrich	— TITULAR — Duke of Teschen; 30 December 1936 – 23 July 1955	Extinct
