= Archduchess Isabella of Austria =

Archduchess Isabella
- Princess Georg of Bavaria
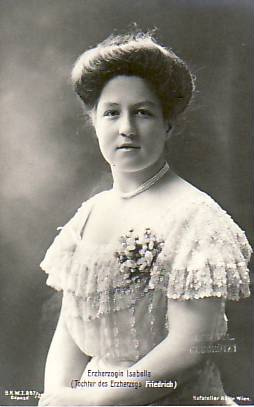
- Isabella in 1911
- Born: 17 November 1888; Pressburg, Austria-Hungary
- Died: 6 December 1973 (aged 85); La Tour-de-Peilz, Switzerland
- Spouse: Prince Georg of Bavaria (m. 1912; div. 1913)
Names
- German: Isabella Maria Theresia Christine Eugenie
- House: Habsburg-Lorraine
- Father: Archduke Friedrich, Duke of Teschen
- Mother: Princess Isabella of Croÿ

Archduchess Isabella Maria Theresia Christine Eugenie of Austria-Teschen (17 November 1888 – 6 December 1973) was a daughter of Archduke Friedrich, Duke of Teschen and his wife, Princess Isabella of Croÿ. She was a member of the House of Habsburg-Lorraine (her grandfather, Archduke Karl Ferdinand of Austria, was a grandson of Leopold II, Holy Roman Emperor).

Isabella was notable for her brief marriage to Prince Georg of Bavaria. Their separation and subsequent annulment were widely reported in newspapers. As a result of this and her later actions as a nurse in the Austro-Hungarian Army, Isabella became considered as a romantic figure; one publication called her "the most romantic heroine of the present war in Austria".

== Family ==
Isabella was the seventh daughter of Archduke Friedrich, Duke of Teschen and his wife, Princess Isabella of Croÿ. Some of her siblings included Maria Anna, Princess of Bourbon-Parma and Maria Christina, Hereditary Princess of Salm-Salm.

Isabella's paternal grandparents were Archduke Karl Ferdinand of Austria and Archduchess Elisabeth Franziska of Austria. Her maternal grandparents were Rudolf, Duke of Croÿ and Princess Natalie of Ligne.

== Marriage ==
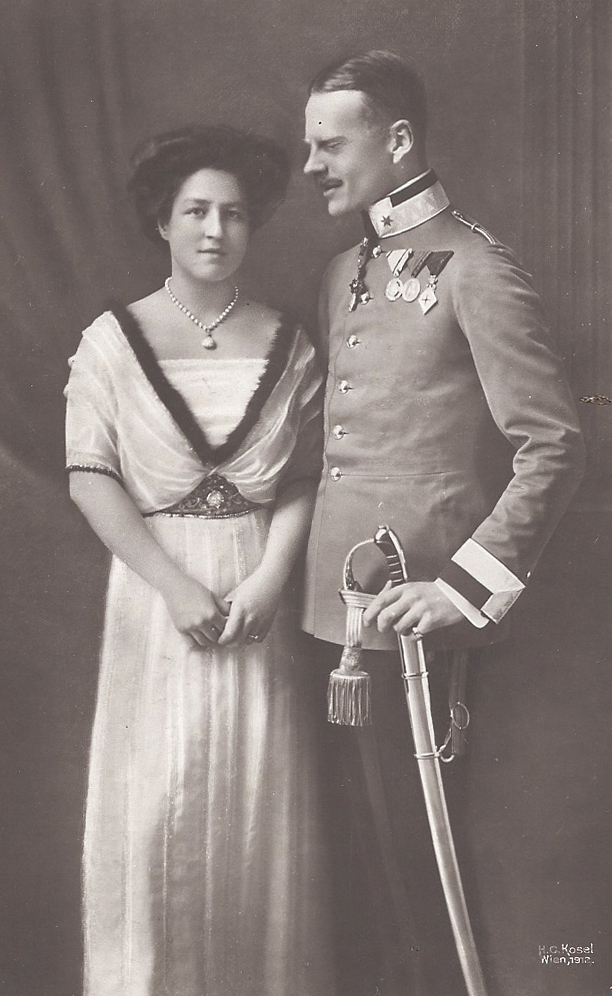
Archduchess Isabella of Austria with her husband, Prince Georg of Bavaria, c. 1912.

=== Wedding ceremony ===
On 10 February 1912, Isabella married her distant cousin Prince Georg of Bavaria. He was the elder son of Prince Leopold of Bavaria and his wife Archduchess Gisela of Austria. The wedding took place at the Schönbrunn Palace in Vienna, and was attended by many important figures, including Franz Joseph I of Austria, Prince Georg's maternal grandfather. Before the wedding, Isabella renounced all rights of succession to the Austrian and Hungarian thrones, an act required of all archduchesses when they married, regardless of the groom's rank. She solemnly made her renunciation in front of the entire Viennese court.

It is believed that Isabella had second thoughts even before the marriage, but was forced to go through with the plans regardless. On the evening before the wedding, a mysterious fire broke out; it was extinguished before the building was destroyed, but not before it destroyed her wedding dress and vast trousseau. Isabella reportedly used the fire as an excuse to postpone the wedding, indicating her guilt by some. One account states, "The bride, rebellious and tearful, showed in every action that she hated her husband".

=== Separation ===
The couple honeymooned in Wales, Paris, and Algiers but separated before they returned to Bavaria. Sources state that they quarreled all through the honeymoon and became irreconcilable. Upon their return, the couple took up residence in Munich, where Isabella first experienced Bavarian court life. They lived there for three days before Isabella left the city for her Viennese home to stay with her mother, and refused to return. Family members tried to bring about a reconciliation, and there seemed to be hopes for a resolution for a small period of time. When these failed, Georg's father Prince Leopold even took a special journey to Vienna to convince Isabella to return. In the end however, all efforts failed. The two were very different in character and disposition, and Isabella reportedly felt she had been slighted by members of the Bavarian royal court. The reason officially assigned stated that their separation was due to the "incompatibility based upon fundamental differences of character". On 11 October 1912, the Lord Chamberlain to Luitpold, Prince Regent of Bavaria made an official announcement concerning the couple. While he declared the Prince Regent's opposition to an annulment as a means of separation, he also stated his consent for a divorce:

"Public attention has recently and repeatedly been called to the deeply regrettable domestic conflict which has arisen between Prince George of Bavaria and his wife, Princess Isabelle. It is hereby stated that all reports to the effect that there is ground for declaring the marriage null and void are entirely unfounded. It is the truth from the very beginning there has been profound incompatibility between the couple, which springs from differences in their character, and on account of which the marital relationship between them has been utterly destroyed. If a dissolution of the marriage should take place, it could only be by way of divorce."

On 17 January 1913, the union was officially dissolved by the Royal Bavarian Supreme Court. Despite the Lord Chamberlain's previous declaration to the contrary, it was annulled by the Holy See on the grounds of non-consummation on 5 March of that same year. Georg later became ordained as a Catholic priest.

== Later life ==
Upon her annulment, Isabella recovered all claims to the Habsburg and Hungarian thrones that she had previously renounced. Like earlier archduchesses, who were either widowed or separated from their husbands, it was assumed that Isabella would join a convent. She chose another path however.

In the months leading up to World War I, it was discovered that there was a great lack of skilled nurses available for service in wartime. The Red Cross accordingly opened several schools in Austria-Hungary in order to train more nurses. In 1913, Isabella underwent training at one of the largest Vienna hospitals for the poor, and planned afterwards to join the Austrian Red Cross. She immediately became a nurse in the Austrian army during the war under the name Sister Irmgard (sometimes called Hildegard), treating wounded soldiers who came into her care. She established her own nursing staff, and donated much of her wealth to the purchasing of medical supplies.

According to the newspaper the Berliner Lokal-Anzeiger, in 1915 Isabella became engaged to the Viennese surgeon Paul Albrecht until Emperor Franz Joseph I of Austria forbade the marriage. She thus never married again and died in La Tour-de-Peilz, Switzerland on 6 December 1973.

== Ancestry ==
Ancestors of Archduchess Isabella of Austria

8. Archduke Charles, Duke of Teschen
4. Archduke Karl Ferdinand of Austria
9. Princess Henrietta of Nassau-Weilburg
2. Archduke Friedrich, Duke of Teschen
10. Archduke Joseph, Palatine of Hungary
5. Archduchess Elisabeth Franziska of Austria
11. Duchess Maria Dorothea of Württemberg
1. Archduchess Isabella of Austria
12. Alfred, 10th Duke of Croÿ
6. Rudolf, 11th Duke of Croÿ
13. Princess Eleonore of Salm-Salm
3. Princess Isabella of Croÿ
14. Eugène, 8th Prince of Ligne
7. Princess Natalie of Ligne
15. Nathalie de Trazegnies

== Sources ==
- Radziwill, Catherine (1916). The Austrian Court From Within. London: Cassel and Company, LTD. ISBN 1-4021-9370-X.
