= Frederick Baldwin Adams =

American businessman and philanthropist

- Born: February 5, 1878; Toledo, Ohio
- Died: October 23, 1961 (aged 83); River House, New York City
- Education: St. Paul's School; Yale University
- Occupations: Businessman and philanthropist
- Employer: New York Central Railroad
- Board member of: West Indies Sugar Corp; Air Reduction Company
- Spouse: Ellen Walters Delano (after 1907)
- Children: Frederick B. Adams Jr. Laura Adams

Frederick Baldwin Adams (5 February 1878 – 23 October 1961) was an American businessman and philanthropist.

== Early life ==
Adams was born in Toledo, Ohio, the son of a bank cashier. His father had moved to Ohio from New England. Frederick was sent east to attend St. Paul's School in Concord, New Hampshire, at the age of fourteen. From St. Paul's, he went to Yale, where he received an AB in 1900. He was a member of the Skull and Bones society.

== Career ==
His first job after Yale was as a claim agent for the Mohawk Division of the New York Central Railroad. In 1902, he became secretary to Robert C. Pruyn, and the following year became secretary of the Union Trust Company of Albany. It was only a few years later that Robert Pruyn would hire Charles Edward Adams as his secretary, Frederick's brother, a graduate of St. Paul's and a member of Skull and Bones. Adams moved to New York City in 1905 to become a partner in the firm of Potter, Choate and Prentice.

During his lifetime he served as Chairman of the West Indies Sugar Corp. He was also connected with the Atlantic Coast Line Railroad; the Louisville & Nashville Railroad; the Clinchfield Railroad; and the Chicago, Indianapolis & Louisville Railroad. Adams also branched out into other areas, becoming involved with the Union Trust Company of Albany; the Wright Aeronautical Company; the Air Reduction Company; Potter, Choate & Prentice; and Schroder, Rockefeller & Co.

Adams was chairman of the Board of the Air Reduction Company. It was engaged in the manufacture and sale of oxygen, acetylene, and other gasses and oxy-acetylene cutting and welding equipment. It was the leading company of its field and had links to Lee, Higginson & Co., the Chase Manhattan Bank, and the Guaranty Trust Co. In 1930, the company made over $5 million in profits.

Adams was an elected member of the American Academy of Arts and Sciences and the American Philosophical Society. He was involved with the Boys Club of New York, the National Foundation for Infantile Paralysis, the Fifth Avenue Hospital, and served on the planning committee of the Roosevelt National Memorial. He was a member of the Knickerbocker Club of New York.

== Personal life ==
In 1907, he was married to Ellen Walters Delano. Ellen, a first cousin of President Franklin Delano Roosevelt, was the daughter of Warren Delano IV, and the granddaughter of William Thompson Walters, a merchant and art collector. They had two children:

- Frederick Baldwin Adams, Jr., who graduated from Yale
- Laura Delano Adams (1927–2005), who married John Eastman, Jr.

With the small fortune he made from his business interests, Adams maintained a house in New York City, a summer home on Campobello Island, and a plantation on the Cape Fear River.

Adams died in 1961 at River House, New York City, from a long illness.
