= Archduke Friedrich, Duke of Teschen =

Archduke Friedrich
- Royal prince of Hungary and Bohemia
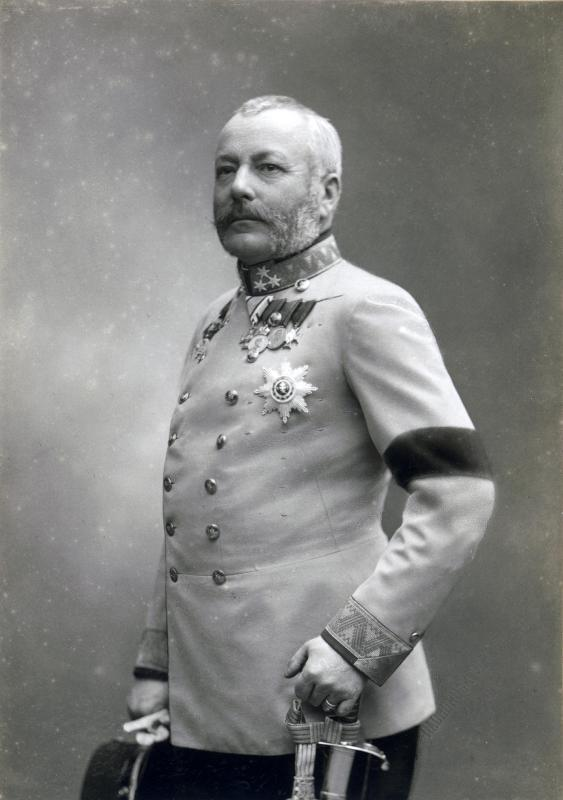
- 1908 portrait

Supreme Commander of the Imperial and Royal Armed Forces
- In office: 11 July 1914 – 2 December 1916
- Predecessor: Franz Joseph I
- Successor: Charles I

Duke of Teschen
- Reign: 18 February 1895 – 3 April 1919
- Predecessor: Archduke Albrecht
- Born: 4 June 1856; Gross Seelowitz, Margraviate of Moravia, Austrian Empire
- Died: 30 December 1936 (aged 80); Magyaróvár, Kingdom of Hungary
- Burial: Imperial Crypt
- Spouse: Princess Isabella of Croÿ (m. 1878; died 1931)
- Issue: Maria Christina, Hereditary Princess of Salm-Salm; Maria Anna, Princess of Bourbon-Parma; Maria Henrietta, Princess of Hohenlohe-Schillingsfürst; Archduchess Natalie; Archduchess Stephanie; Archduchess Gabriele; Isabella, Princess of Bavaria; Maria Alice, Baroness Friedrich Waldbott von Bassenheim; Archduke Albrecht Franz, Duke of Teschen
- House: Habsburg-Lorraine
- Father: Archduke Karl Ferdinand of Austria
- Mother: Archduchess Elisabeth Franziska of Austria

Archduke Friedrich, Duke of Teschen (Friedrich Maria Albrecht Wilhelm Karl; 4 June 1856 – 30 December 1936) was a member of the House of Habsburg-Lorraine and the Supreme Commander of the Imperial and Royal Armed Forces of the Austro-Hungarian Empire during World War I, having previously served as both commander-in-chief of the Imperial-Royal Landwehr and inspector-general of the Austro-Hungarian Army.

== Early life ==
Friedrich was born at the castle of Gross Seelowitz in Moravia (today Židlochovice near Brno in the Czech Republic), the son of Karl Ferdinand, Archduke of Austria and his wife Archduchess Elisabeth Franziska of Austria.

His siblings included Queen Maria Cristina of Spain, Archduke Charles Stephen of Austria, a candidate for the Kingdom of Poland, and Archduke Eugen of Austria, an Austrian officer.

When Friedrich's uncle Archduke Albert, Duke of Teschen died in 1895, he and his brothers each inherited large estates. Friedrich owned properties at Ungarisch-Altenburg (now Mosonmagyaróvár in Hungary), Belleje, Saybusch (now Żywiec in Poland), Seelowitz (now Židlochovice) and Frýdek in the Czech Republic, and Pressburg (now Bratislava in Slovakia). His Vienna residence, the Palais-Albrecht, housed the Albertina art collection which he owned.

== Marriage ==
On 8 October 1878 Friedrich married at Château de l'Hermitage in France, Princess Isabella of Croÿ, daughter of Rudolf, Duke of Croÿ, and his wife Princess Natalie of Ligne. They had nine children:

- Archduchess Maria Christina of Austria-Teschen (17 November 1879 - 6 August 1962) she married Emanuel, Hereditary Prince of Salm-Salm on 10 May 1902. They have four children.
- Archduchess Maria Anna of Austria-Teschen (6 January 1882 - 25 February 1940) she married Elias, Duke of Parma on 25 May 1903. They have eight children.
- Archduchess Maria Henrietta of Austria-Teschen (10 January 1883 - 2 September 1956) she married Prince Gottfried von Hohenlohe-Schillingsfürst (later Austro-Hungarian Ambassador to Germany) on 3 June 1908. They have three children.
- Archduchess Natalie of Austria-Teschen (12 January 1884 - 23 March 1898)
- Archduchess Stephanie of Austria-Teschen (1 May 1886 - 25 August 1890)
- Archduchess Gabriele of Austria-Teschen (14 September 1887 - 15 November 1954)
- Archduchess Isabella of Austria-Teschen (17 November 1888 - 6 December 1973) she married Prince Georg of Bavaria on 10 February 1912 (marriage dissolved).
- Archduchess Maria Alice of Austria-Teschen (15 January 1893 - 1 July 1962) she married Friedrich Heinrich Carl Maria Baron Waldbott von Bassenheim, son of Friedrich Lothar Baron Waldbott von Bassenheim and Hedwig Baronin von Beust, on 8 May 1920. They have six children.
- Albrecht Franz, Duke of Teschen (24 July 1897 - 23 July 1955) he married Irene Lelbach on 16 August 1930 and they were divorced on 1 June 1937. He then married Katalin Bocskay de Felsö-Banya on 9 May 1938 and they were divorced in 1951. They had two daughters. He remarried, again, Lydia Strauss-Dorner after 1951. They had one son.

== Military career ==
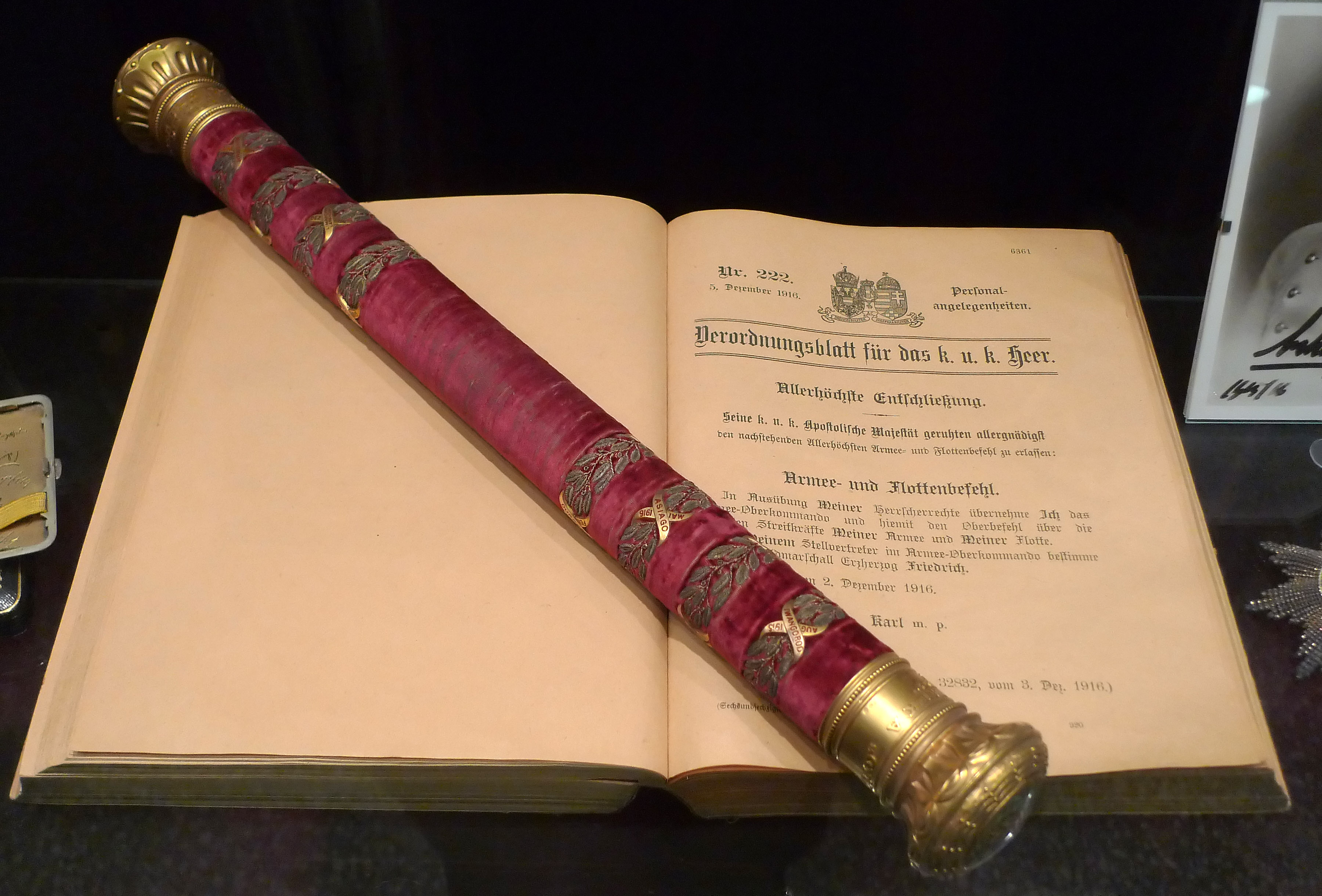
Friedrich's field marshal's baton at the Museum of Military History, Vienna

Like most of the princes of the ruling house, Friedrich adopted a military career, and served creditably for many years as commandant of the V. (Pressburg) Corps. Subsequently, commander-in-chief of the Imperial-Royal Landwehr (militia) and army inspector, he became, after the murder of the heir to the throne, Archduke Franz Ferdinand, inspector-general of the Austro-Hungarian Army.

In World War I, he was —from the dynastic point of view —as grandson of the victor of the Battle of Aspern-Essling, Archduke Charles, and as nephew of the victor of the Battle of Custoza, Archduke Albrecht, the predestined head of the armed forces of Austria-Hungary; and on 11 July 1914 Friedrich was appointed supreme commander of the Austro-Hungarian Army by Emperor Franz Joseph I. He thought it his duty to accept this heavy responsibility, but, modestly underestimating his own powers, left the actual exercise of the command to his chief of staff, Franz Conrad von Hötzendorf. In the performance of ceremonial duties, and as mediator for the settlement of the conflicting demands of the military, civil and allied elements, his services were undeniable. He was promoted to the rank of Generalfeldmarschall on 8 December 1914. In February 1917 Emperor Charles I himself took over the supreme command; the Archduke, although the Emperor's representative, no longer appeared in the foreground.

== Retirement and death ==
After World War I the governments of Austria and Czechoslovakia confiscated all of Friedrich's properties within their borders. These included his palaces in Pressburg and in Vienna and his art collection. He retained his properties in Hungary however. In 1929 he won a court case requiring compensation from the Czechoslovak government.

Friedrich died at Ungarisch-Altenburg (Magyaróvár, now Mosonmagyaróvár) in 1936. His death was the biggest royal event for Hungary since the coronation of King Charles in 1916. The funeral and burial in the parish church in Mosonmagyaróvár was attended by his nephew, the exiled King of Spain; by numerous archdukes; by all the surviving Austro-Hungarian field marshals; by personal representatives of Hitler; by members of the House of Savoy; by the diplomatic corps; by a son of exiled German Kaiser Wilhelm; by representatives of the governments of Germany, Italy and Austria, and by Hungary's regent, Miklós Horthy and his wife. There were members of the Hungarian government and delegates of the German and Austrian in attendance as well. Entire battalions of the Royal Hungarian Army were present to pay their last respects to their former supreme commander.

== Decorations and awards ==
Friedrich received the following decorations and awards:

National orders and decorations

- Knight of the Golden Fleece, 17 April 1873
- Military Merit Cross, 30 November 1892; in Diamonds, 30 November 1898; 1st Class with War Decoration, 9 May 1915
- Grand Cross of St. Stephen, 9 November 1893
- Bronze Military Merit Medal ("Signum Laudis"), September 1899; Gold Medal ("Großes Signum Laudis") on the ribbon of the Military Merit Cross, 17 October 1916
- Red Cross Merit Star, 21 August 1914; with War Decoration, 15 February 1915
- Grand Cross of the Military Order of Maria Theresa, 25 November 1916
- Long Service Cross for Officers, 2nd Class
- Bronze Jubilee Medal for the Armed Forces
- Military Jubilee Medal

Foreign orders and decorations

- Württemberg:
  - Grand Cross of the Württemberg Crown, 21 July 1873
  - Grand Cross of the Military Merit Order, 30 May 1915
- Russian Empire:
  - Knight of St. Andrew, 4 January 1877
  - Knight of St. Alexander Nevsky, 30 December 1878
  - Knight of the White Eagle, 30 December 1878
  - Knight of St. Anna, 1st Class, 30 December 1878
- France: Grand Cross of the Legion of Honour, 30 December 1878
- Belgium: Grand Cordon of the Order of Leopold, 3 July 1881
- (Saxe-Coburg and Gotha) (Duchy of Saxe-Altenburg) (Saxe-Meiningen) Ernestine duchies: Grand Cross of the Saxe-Ernestine House Order, 7 January 1882
- Kingdom of Bavaria:
  - Knight of St. Hubert, 24 May 1889
  - Grand Cross of the Military Order of Max Joseph, 1 May 1915
- Netherlands: Grand Cross of the Netherlands Lion, 12 December 1890
- (Tuscany) Tuscan Grand Ducal Family: Grand Cross of St. Joseph, 26 February 1891
- Kingdom of Saxony:
  - Knight of the Rue Crown, 26 February 1891
  - Commander of the Military Order of St. Henry, 1st Class, 22 May 1915
- Denmark: Knight of the Elephant, 26 May 1892
- Luxembourg: Knight of the Gold Lion of Nassau, 9 June 1892
- Kingdom of Prussia:
  - Knight of the Black Eagle, 22 October 1892; with Golden Collar, 3 October 1903
  - Knight of the Red Eagle, 1st Class, c. 1895
  - Iron Cross, 1st and 2nd Classes, 31 August 1914
  - Pour le Mérite (military), 12 May 1915; with Oak Leaves, 4 January 1917
- Spain:
  - Grand Cross of the Order of Charles III, with Collar, 17 March 1896
  - Grand Cross of Military Merit, 5 November 1905
- Persian Empire: Order of the August Portrait, in Diamonds, 22 October 1900
- Military Order of Malta: Bailiff Grand Cross of Honour, with Distinction for Jerusalem, 19 May 1901
- (Duchy of Parma) Parmese Ducal Family: Grand Cross of the Constantinian Order of St. George, 26 January 1903
- United Kingdom: Honorary Grand Cross of the Bath (military), 10 June 1904
- Sweden: Knight of the Seraphim, 18 December 1907
- Baden:
  - Knight of the House Order of Fidelity, 10 May 1908
  - Grand Cross of the Order of Berthold the First, 10 May 1908
- Saxe-Weimar-Eisenach: Grand Cross of the White Falcon, 10 May 1908
- Kingdom of Bulgaria:
  - Knight of Saints Cyril and Methodius, 12 June 1912
  - Order of Bravery, 1st Class, 19 February 1916
- Ottoman Empire: Gold and Silver Imtiyaz Medals, 19 August 1915
- Mecklenburg:
  - Grand Cross of the Wendish Crown, with Crown in Ore, 10 November 1911
  - Military Merit Cross, 1st and 2nd Classes, 14 March 1915
- Oldenburg: Friedrich August Cross, 1st and 2nd Classes, 19 August 1915
- Brunswick: War Merit Cross, 11 September 1916
- Hohenzollern: Cross of Honour of the Princely House Order of Hohenzollern, 1st Class with Swords, 12 October 1916
- Lippe: War Merit Cross, 5 July 1918

== Ancestry ==
Ancestors of Archduke Friedrich, Duke of Teschen

8. Leopold II, Holy Roman Emperor
4. Archduke Charles, Duke of Teschen
9. Infanta Maria Louisa of Spain
2. Archduke Karl Ferdinand of Austria
10. Frederick William, Prince of Nassau-Weilburg
5. Princess Henrietta of Nassau-Weilburg
11. Burgravine Louise Isabelle of Kirchberg
1. Archduke Friedrich, Duke of Teschen
12. Leopold II, Holy Roman Emperor (= 8)
6. Archduke Joseph, Palatine of Hungary
13. Infanta Maria Louisa of Spain (= 9)
3. Archduchess Elisabeth Franziska of Austria
14. Duke Louis of Württemberg
7. Duchess Maria Dorothea of Württemberg
15. Princess Henriette of Nassau-Weilburg

== Notes ==
Archduke Friedrich, Duke of Teschen House of Habsburg Cadet branch of the House of Lorraine Born: 4 June 1856 Died: 30 December 1936
Titles of nobility
Preceded by Archduke Albert	Duke of Teschen; 18 February 1895 – 3 April 1919	Succeeded by Republic declared
Titles in pretence
Loss of title Republic declared	— TITULAR — Duke of Teschen; 3 April 1919 – 30 December 1936; Reason for succession failure: Austrian nobility titles abolished	Succeeded by Archduke Albrecht Franz
