= Augusta Victoria of Schleswig-Holstein =

German Empress from 1888 to 1918

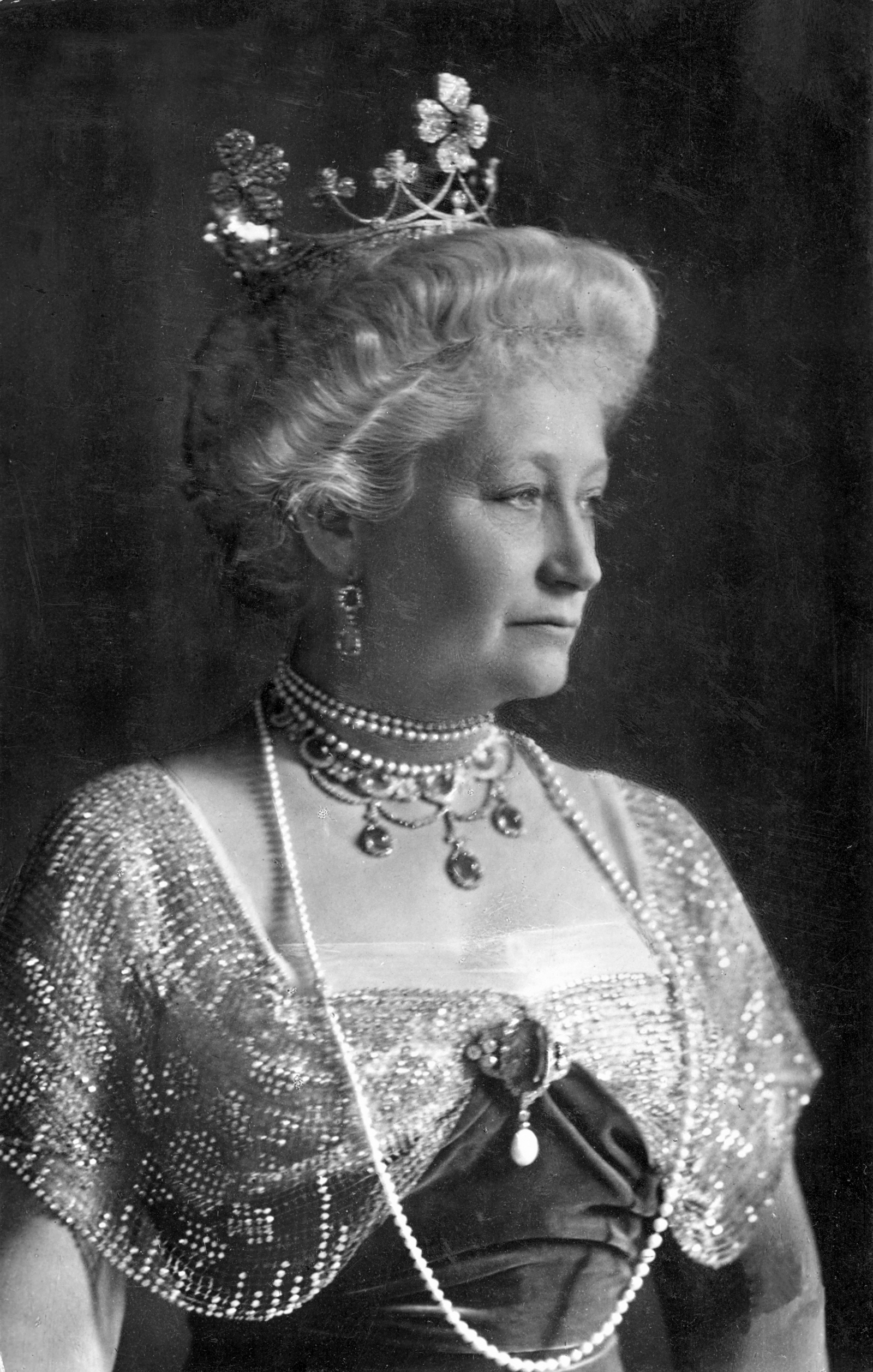
- Augusta Victoria in 1913

German Empress consort Queen consort of Prussia
- Tenure: 15 June 1888 – 9 November 1918
- Born: 22 October 1858; Dolzig Palace, East Brandenburg, Prussia
- Died: 11 April 1921 (aged 62); Huis Doorn, Doorn, Netherlands
- Burial: 19 April 1921; Antique Temple, Potsdam, Germany
- Spouse: Wilhelm II, German Emperor (m. 1881)
- Issue: Wilhelm, German Crown Prince; Prince Eitel Friedrich; Prince Adalbert; Prince August Wilhelm; Prince Oskar; Prince Joachim; Viktoria Luise, Duchess of Brunswick
Names
- German: Auguste Viktoria Friederike Luise Feodora Jenny
- House: Schleswig-Holstein-Sonderburg-Augustenburg
- Father: Frederick VIII, Duke of Schleswig-Holstein
- Mother: Princess Adelheid of Hohenlohe-Langenburg

Augusta Viktoria of Schleswig-Holstein-Sonderburg-Augustenburg (Auguste Viktoria Friederike Luise Feodora Jenny; 22 October 1858 – 11 April 1921) was the last German Empress and Queen of Prussia by marriage to Wilhelm II, German Emperor.

== Early years ==
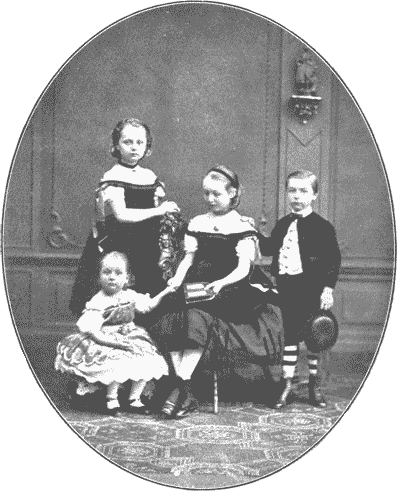
From left to right: Louise Sophie (standing), Feodora Adelheid, Augusta Victoria and Ernst Günther, around 1876

Augusta Victoria was born at Dolzig Castle, the eldest daughter of Frederick VIII, future Duke of Schleswig-Holstein-Sonderburg-Augustenburg, and Princess Adelheid of Hohenlohe-Langenburg, a niece of Queen Victoria, through Victoria's half-sister Feodora. She grew up at Dolzig until the death of her grandfather in 1869, where they then lived at Primkenau Castle. She was known within her family as Dona.

At the end of 1863, a crisis over the Duchy of Holstein intensified because the Danish government sought to remove Holstein from its constitutional union with Denmark and Schleswig. In response, her father returned there to assert his dynastic claims, following the earlier example of his own father, Christian August II, Duke of Schleswig-Holstein. He was initially welcomed after Prussian and Saxon troops occupied Holstein in the course of the federal execution.

When Prussia and Austria defeated Denmark in the Second Schleswig War (1864) and annexed Schleswig, Holstein, and Lauenburg, the Austrian administrators initially allowed her father some authority. However, after Prussia expelled Austria from Holstein in 1866, he was politically sidelined and forced to leave. The family thereafter lived alternately in Gotha and at Primkenau Castle in the Sprottau district, which had belonged to her grandfather since 1853.

The eventual marriage of Augusta Victoria to the Prussian-German heir helped officially reconcile the Augustenburg family with the new German state.

== Marriage and children ==
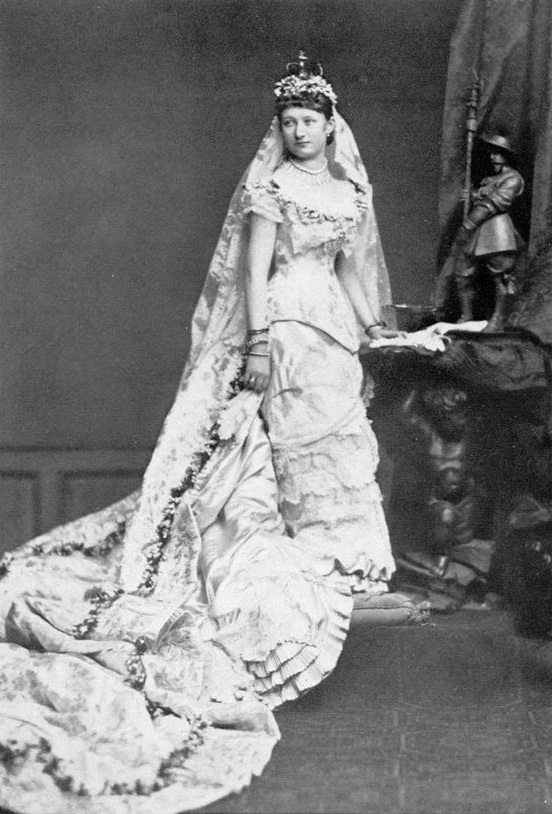
Augusta Victoria in her wedding dress, 1881

Prince Wilhelm had first met Augusta in 1868 at Reinhardsbrunn Palace in Thuringia. Their acquaintance was renewed by their parents' friendship in the summer of 1878 in Potsdam. The engagement on 14 February 1880 in Gotha (shortly after the death of her father) was fully supported by the Prussian Crown Prince and Crown Princess as part of family politics, but opposed by the Prussian court and initially even by Kaiser Wilhelm I, who considered the match inappropriate because her family was not deemed equal in rank (due to a bourgeois great-grandmother and a grandmother who had only been a countess). There was also concern about political complications for Prussia due to the 1866 annexation of the duchies, as Duke Friedrich VIII still maintained his claims. However, Otto von Bismarck was a strong proponent of the marriage, believing that it would end the dispute between the Prussian government and Augusta's father. In the end, Wilhelm's intransigence, the support of Bismarck, and a determination to move beyond the rejection of his proposal to Ella, led the reluctant imperial family to give official consent. For these reasons the engagement was not officially announced until 2 June 1880.

On 27 February 1881, Augusta married her half-second cousin Prince Wilhelm of Prussia. Augusta's maternal grandmother Princess Feodora of Leiningen was the half-sister of Queen Victoria, who was Wilhelm's maternal grandmother. Wilhelm had earlier proposed to his first cousin, Princess Elisabeth of Hesse and by Rhine (known in the family as "Ella"), a daughter of his mother's sister, but she declined. He did not react well, and was adamant that he would soon marry another princess.

=== Issue ===
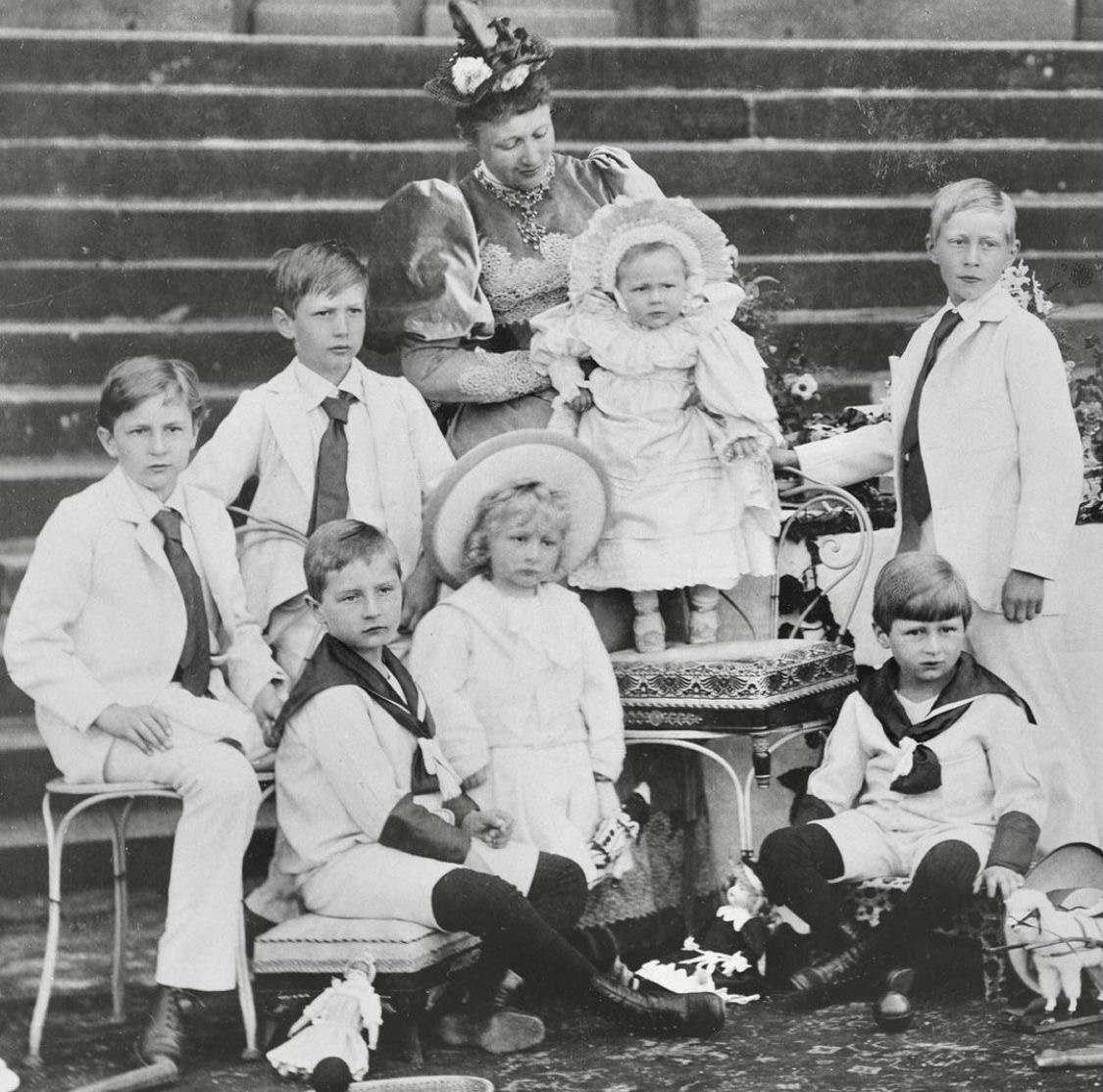
Empress Augusta Victoria with all of her children, 1890s

Emperor Wilhelm II and Empress Augusta Victoria had six sons and one daughter:

Name	Birth	Death	Notes
Wilhelm, Crown Prince of Prussia	6 May 1882	20 July 1951	married 1905, Duchess Cecilie of Mecklenburg-Schwerin; had issue
Prince Eitel Friedrich of Prussia	7 July 1883	8 December 1942	married 1906, Duchess Sophia Charlotte of Oldenburg; had no issue
Prince Adalbert of Prussia	14 July 1884	22 September 1948	married 1914, Princess Adelaide of Saxe-Meiningen; had issue
Prince August Wilhelm of Prussia	29 January 1887	25 March 1949	married 1908, Princess Alexandra Victoria of Schleswig-Holstein-Sonderburg-Glücksburg; had issue
Prince Oskar of Prussia	27 July 1888	27 January 1958	married 1914, Countess Ina Maria von Bassewitz; had issue
Prince Joachim of Prussia	17 December 1890	18 July 1920	married 1916, Princess Marie-Auguste of Anhalt; had issue
Princess Victoria Louise of Prussia	13 September 1892	11 December 1980	married 1913, Ernest Augustus, Duke of Brunswick; had issue

== German Empress ==
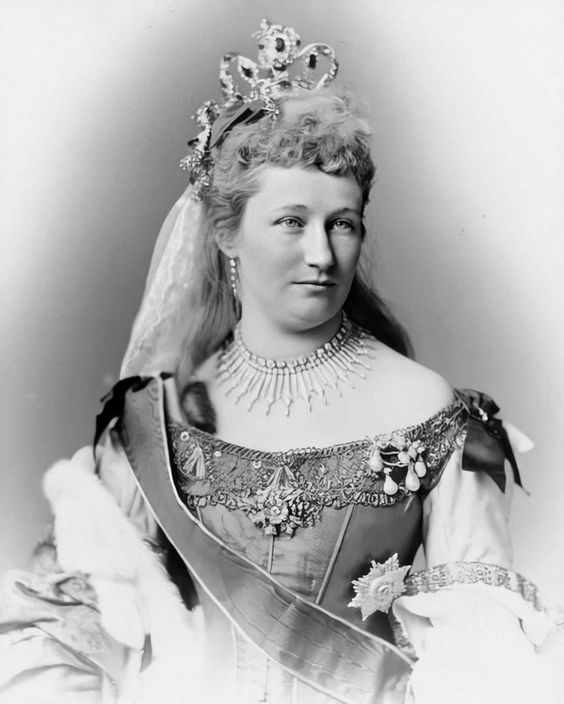
Augusta Victoria in coronation robes, shortly after her ascension as German Empress in 1888

When her husband ascended the throne on 15 June 1888, Augusta became German Empress and Queen of Prussia. Her husband, who often suffered from bouts of melancholia, was often emotionally supported by her. At the same time she was widely believed to have exerted a harmful political influence over the Emperor; Grand Duke Ernest Louis of Hesse-Darmstadt called her "the evil spirit of Wilhelm II."

Augusta was known as "Dona" within the family. She had a somewhat lukewarm relationship with her mother-in-law, Empress Victoria, who had hoped that Dona would help to heal the rift between herself and Wilhelm; this was not to be the case. Victoria was also annoyed that the title of head of the Red Cross went to Dona, who had no nursing or charity experience or inclination (though in her memoirs, Princess Viktoria Luise paints a different picture, stating that her mother loved charity work). Augusta often took pleasure in snubbing her mother-in-law, usually small incidents, such as telling her that she would be wearing a different dress than the one Victoria recommended, that she would not be riding to get her figure back after childbirth as Wilhelm had no intention of stopping at one son, and informing her that Augusta's daughter, Viktoria, was not named after her (though, again, in her memoirs, Viktoria Luise states that she was named after both her grandmother and her great-grandmother, Queen Victoria).

Augusta and her mother-in-law grew closer for a few years when Wilhelm became emperor, as Augusta was often lonely while he was away on military exercises and turned to her mother-in-law for the companionship of rank, although she never left her children alone with her lest they be influenced by her well-known liberalism. Nevertheless, the two were often seen riding in a carriage together. Augusta was at Victoria's bedside when she died of breast cancer in 1901.

Augusta was deeply religious, a devout adherent of the Protestant Church of the Old Prussian Union, and a representative of strict moral conduct. She had a strong aversion to divorced women and generally refused to receive them at court. Likewise, she had less than cordial relationships with some of Wilhelm's sisters, particularly the recently married Crown Princess Sophie of Greece. In 1890, when Sophie announced her intention to convert to Greek Orthodoxy, Dona summoned her and told her that if she did so, not only would Wilhelm find it unacceptable as the head of the Evangelical State Church of Prussia's older Provinces, but she would be barred from Germany and her soul would end up in Hell. Sophie replied that it was her business whether or not she did. Augusta became hysterical and gave birth prematurely to her son, Prince Joachim, as a result of which she was overprotective of him for the rest of his life, believing that he was too delicate. Evidently, so did Emperor Wilhelm; he wrote to his mother that if the baby had died, Sophie would have murdered it. In 1893 the Empress could not reconcile with her conscience to visit Pope Leo XIII during a trip to Rome, though repeated entreaties from the Foreign Office and her husband eventually persuaded her to make the visit so as not to cause an international complication.

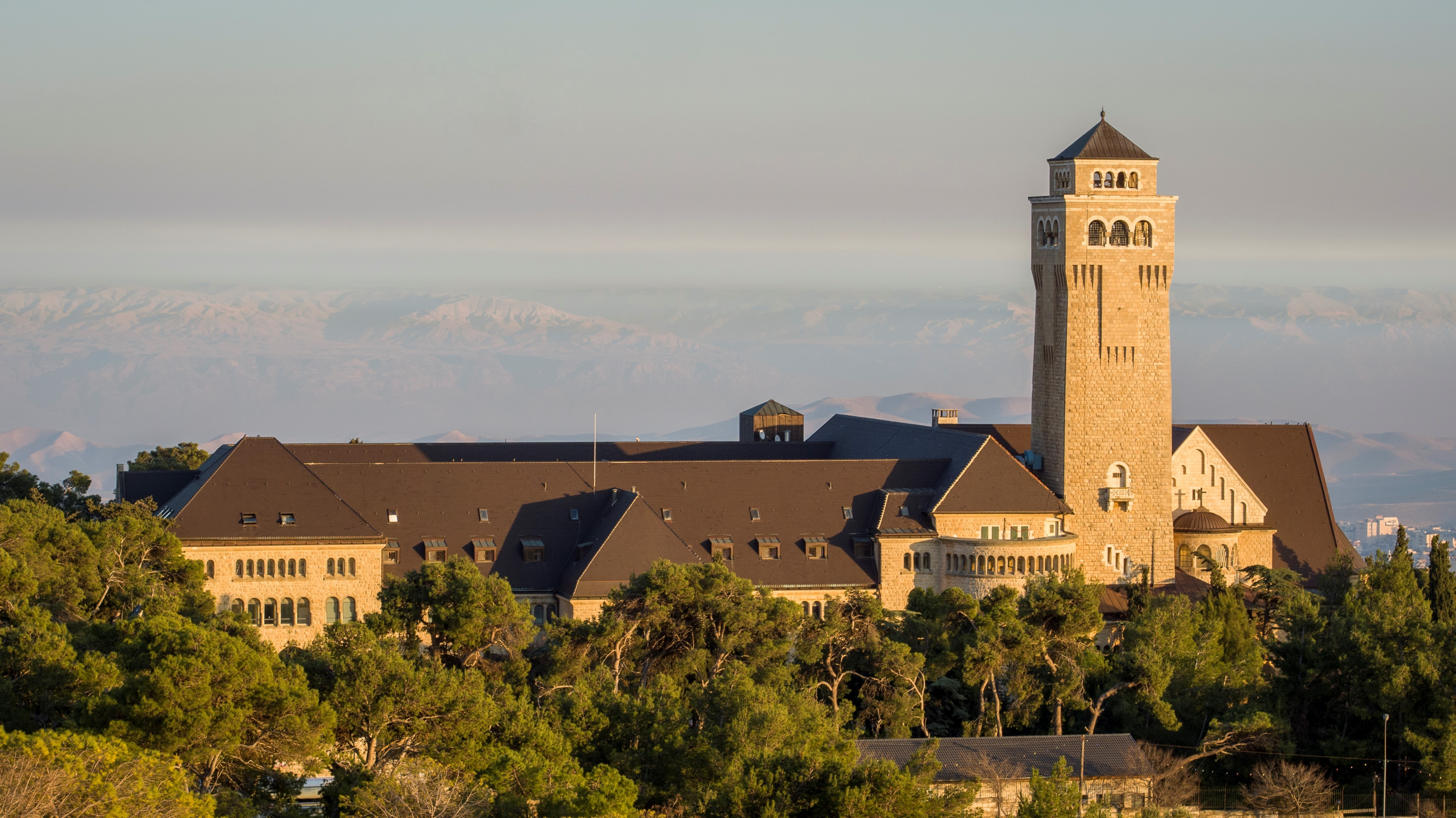
Augusta Victoria Hospital in Jerusalem

Under Augusta's patronage the Evangelical Church Aid Society was founded soon reorganised as the Evangelical Church Construction Association and she energetically promoted the construction of Protestant churches in Berlin, primarily in the new workers' quarters, and also elsewhere. After accompanying her husband on his Palestine journey in 1898, the evangelical "Augusta Victoria Foundation" in Jerusalem was able in 1914 to consecrate the Church of the Ascension on the Mount of Olives. Her strong support for Protestant church building earned her the nickname "Kirchenjuste."

Augusta was also highly engaged in the social sphere; for this reason she was more popular and esteemed than her husband, whose public actions were often criticised and ridiculed by the population. She supported the women's movement and worked, thanks to suggestions from Marie Martin, for improved education for girls and young women. Through her support for charitable and church-related efforts within the German Reich she came into contact with Christian reform movements led by Friedrich von Bodelschwingh the Elder and Adolf Stoecker.

During the First World War she was active in charitable organisations and especially concerned with hospital work.

In late 1918, as Germany was collapsing toward defeat in World War I and revolutionary unrest was spreading, Kaiser Wilhelm II was under increasing pressure from his government and political leaders to abdicate the throne to avoid further chaos. After President Woodrow Wilson's third note of 23 October 1918, it became increasingly clear that Wilhelm's abdication would be necessary to secure tolerable peace conditions for his people. At that point, Augusta Victoria strongly insisted that Wilhelm should not step down and tried to block abdication efforts. On 1 November she reportedly telephoned Chancellor Prince Maximilian of Baden, threatening to publicly expose his homosexuality if he continued to push her husband toward abdication; he then suffered a nervous breakdown and had to be sedated for several days with opium-based medicine.

== Exile and death ==
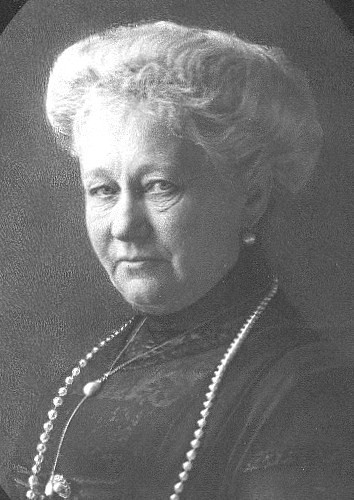
Former German Empress Augusta Victoria in exile c. 1920

In the course of the November Revolution, on 27 November 1918 after a brief stay at the Villa Ingenheim, owned by her son, Prince Eitel Friedrich, she followed her husband into Dutch exile and by 1920 took up residence with him at Huis Doorn in the province of Utrecht. Wilhelm II wrote in 1922:

"The revolution broke the Empress's heart. She aged visibly from November 1918 onward and could no longer muster the physical resistance she once had. Thus her decline began. She bore the longing for German soil most heavily. Nonetheless she sought still to comfort me ..."

She had already suffered a stroke in 1918, which greatly impaired her health. The press speculated late that year that she "would hardly live to see the new year." In July 1920, her youngest son Prince Joachim died by suicide, about which Wilhelm commented, "That rascal has done that to us and especially to his mother as well!"

The shock of exile and abdication, with the breakdown of Joachim's marriage and his subsequent suicide, proved too much for Augusta's health. She died on 11 April 1921 at Huis Doorn at Doorn in the Netherlands, from a severe heart attack. Some of her last reported words were, "I must not die; I cannot leave the Kaiser alone."

Many German newspapers marked the death announcement with black borders. Her death after three years in exile was mourned by her supporters as the loss of a national mother. Her body was transported back to Germany for burial at the Antique Temple in the park of Sanssouci Palace (Potsdam); though Wilhelm II and the Crown Prince were not permitted to attend the funeral on 19 April 1921, high dignitaries such as Paul von Hindenburg, Erich Ludendorff, and Alfred von Tirpitz were present. Thousands followed her coffin.

Shortly before her death, Augusta expressed a wish that the Kaiser remarry after her death. Wilhelm II honored this by marrying on 5 November 1922, about 18 months after her death, the similarly widowed Princess Hermine of Schönaich-Carolath.

== In literature ==
The funeral of Augusta Victoria is reflected upon in the novel by Katherine Anne Porter, Ship of Fools. In it, a German passenger silently reminisces on the funeral and its cinematic showing to a small colony of Germans living abroad in Mexico and describes the outpouring of public grief that was seen within that community. Augusta Victoria's death is viewed among Germans who lived through the First World War as the ending of a great epoch, the conclusion of which forever divorces them from their maternal country and enshrines Augusta Victoria as a venerable saint and symbol of a Germany long past.

Augusta Victoria was portrayed by Sunnyi Melles in the 2018 miniseries Kaisersturz ("Kaiser's Fall"), depicting the German Revolution and the subsequent fall of the German monarchy.

== Gallery ==
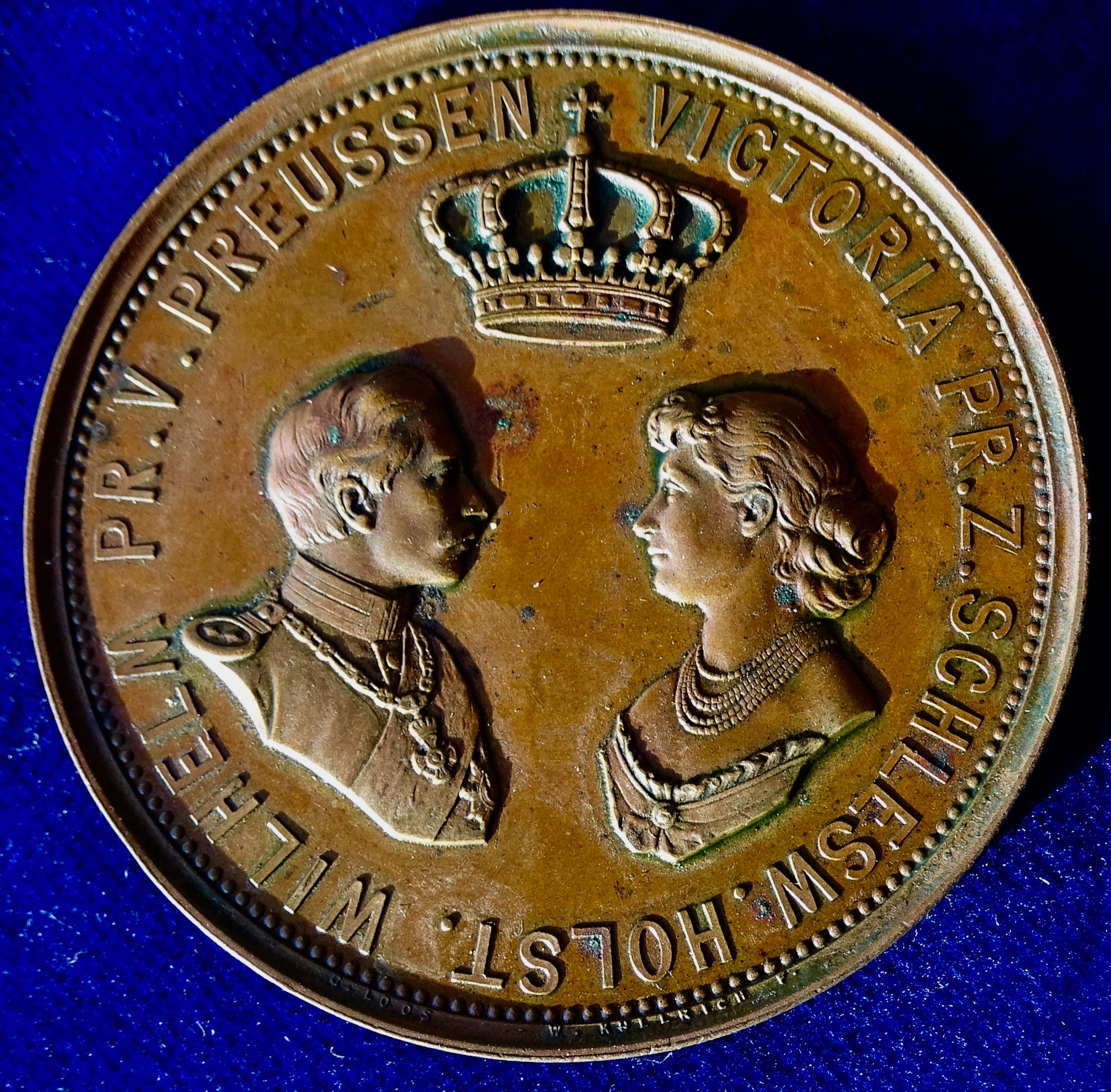
German State Prussia, Wedding Medal 1881 Prince Wilhelm and Auguste Victoria, obverse.

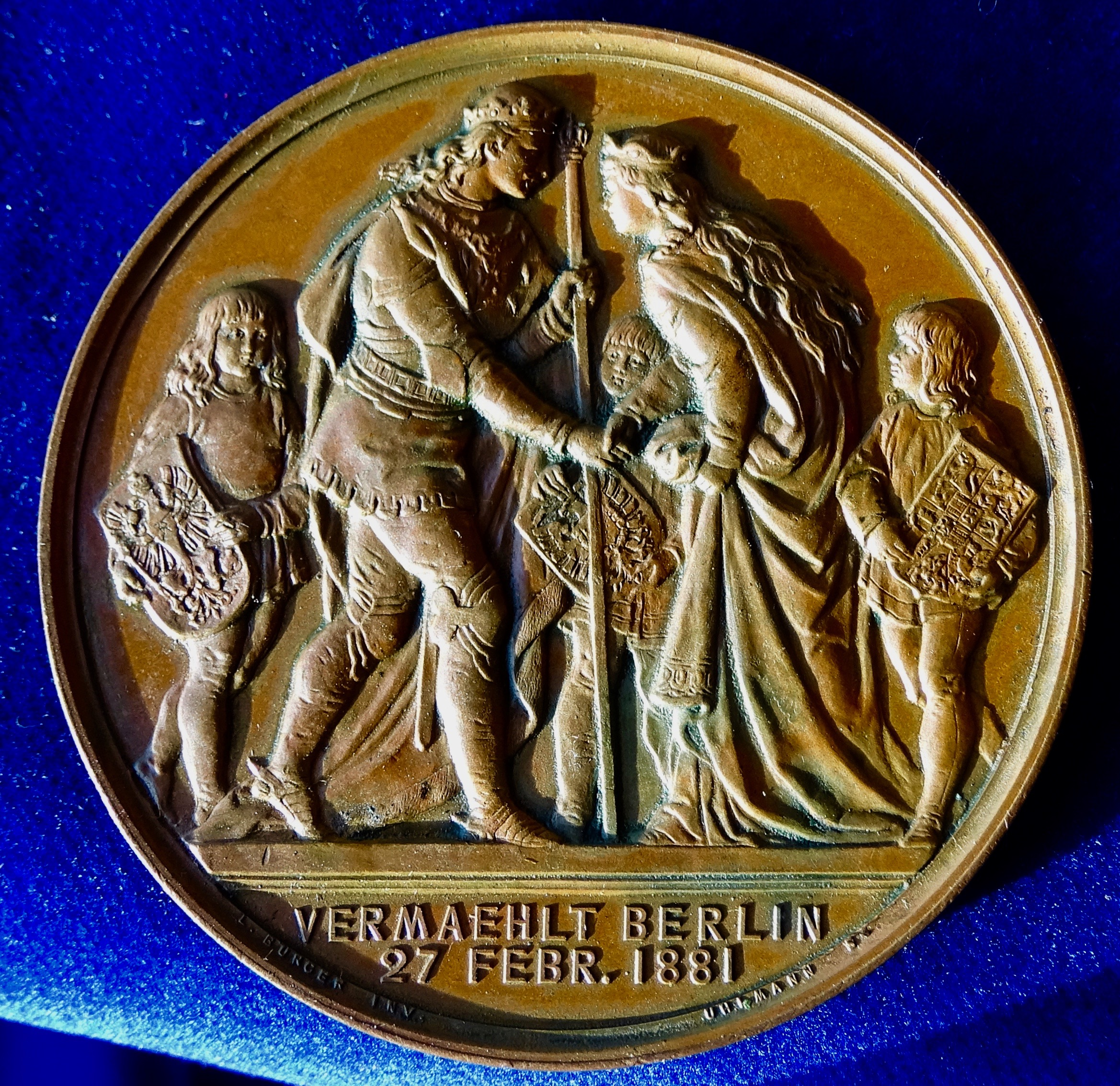
The reverse shows the couple in Medieval costumes in front of 3 squires carrying the shields of Prussia, Germany, and Schleswig-Holstein.

Portrait of the Queen of Prussia, by Philip de László, 1908.

== Honours ==
National honours

- Knight Grand Cordon with Collar of the Imperial and Royal Order of the Black Eagle 25 June 1888
- Knight Grand Cordon of the Imperial and Royal Order of the Red Eagle
- Grand Mistress Dame of the Imperial and Royal Decoration of Louise, Special Class
- Knight Grand Cordon of the Imperial and Royal Order of Saint John
- Grand Mistress Dame of the Imperial and Royal Decoration of the Cross for Merit, Special Class
- Grand Mistress Dame of the Imperial and Royal Decoration of the Cross of Merit, Special Class
- Knight of the Imperial and Royal Decoration of the Red Cross, 1st Class, 22 October 1898
- Knight of the Imperial and Royal Decoration of the Cross of Jerusalem
  - (Kingdom of Bavaria) Bavarian Royal Family: Dame of the Royal Decoration of Saint Elizabeth, Special Class
  - (Kingdom of Bavaria) Bavarian Royal Family: Dame Grand Cross of the Royal Order of Theresa
  - (Kingdom of Bavaria) Bavarian Royal Family: Dame of the Royal Decoration of Saint Anne, Special Class
  - (Kingdom of Saxony) Saxonian Royal Family: Dame Grand Cross of the Royal Order of Sidonia
  - (Kingdom of Saxony) Saxonian Royal Family: Dame of the Royal Decoration of Maria Anna, Special Class
  - (Kingdom of Württemberg) Württembergian Royal Family: Dame of the Royal Decoration of Olga, Special Class, 1889
  - Lippean Princely Family: Dame of the Princely Decoration of Bertha, Special Class

Foreign honours

- (Austria-Hungary) Austrian Imperial and Royal Family:
  - Dame Grand Cross of the Imperial and Royal Order of Elizabeth, in Diamonds, 1900
  - Dame of the Imperial and Royal Order of the Starry Cross, 1st Class
- (Kingdom of Portugal) Portuguese Royal Family: Dame Grand Cross of the Royal Order of Saint Isabel
- Romania: Dame Grand Cross of the Order of Carol I
- (Russian Empire) Russian Imperial Family: Dame Grand Cordon of the Imperial Order of Saint Catherine
- (Restoration (Spain)) Spanish Royal Family: 830th Dame Grand Cross of the Royal Order of Queen Maria Luisa, 16 May 1881
- Empire of Japan: Dame Grand Cordon of the Order of the Precious Crown, 13 April 1902
- (Ottoman Empire) Turkey: Dame Grand Cordon with Chain of the Order of Charity, Special Class
- United Kingdom: Dame of the Royal Order of Victoria and Albert, 1st Class
- United Kingdom: Recipient of the Queen Victoria Diamond Jubilee Medal

== Arms ==
Coat of arms of Empress Augusta Victoria

Imperial monogram of Empress Augusta Victoria

Variation of Empress Augusta Victoria's monogram

Monogram of the Königin Augusta Garde-Grenadier-Regiment Nr.4

== Ancestry ==
Ancestors of Augusta Victoria of Schleswig-Holstein

8. Frederick Christian II, Duke of Schleswig-Holstein-Sonderburg-Augustenburg
4. Christian Augustus II, Duke of Schleswig-Holstein-Sonderburg-Augustenburg
9. Princess Louise Augusta of Denmark
2. Frederick VIII, Duke of Schleswig-Holstein
10. Count Christian Danneskiold-Samsøe
5. Countess Louise Danneskiold-Samsøe
11. Henriette Kaas
1. Princess Augusta Victoria of Schleswig-Holstein-Sonderburg-Augustenburg
12. Karl Ludwig, Prince of Hohenlohe-Langenburg
6. Ernst I, Prince of Hohenlohe-Langenburg
13. Countess Amalie Henriette of Solms-Baruth
3. Princess Adelheid of Hohenlohe-Langenburg
14. Emich Carl, Prince of Leiningen
7. Princess Feodora of Leiningen
15. Princess Victoria of Saxe-Coburg-Saalfeld

== See also ==
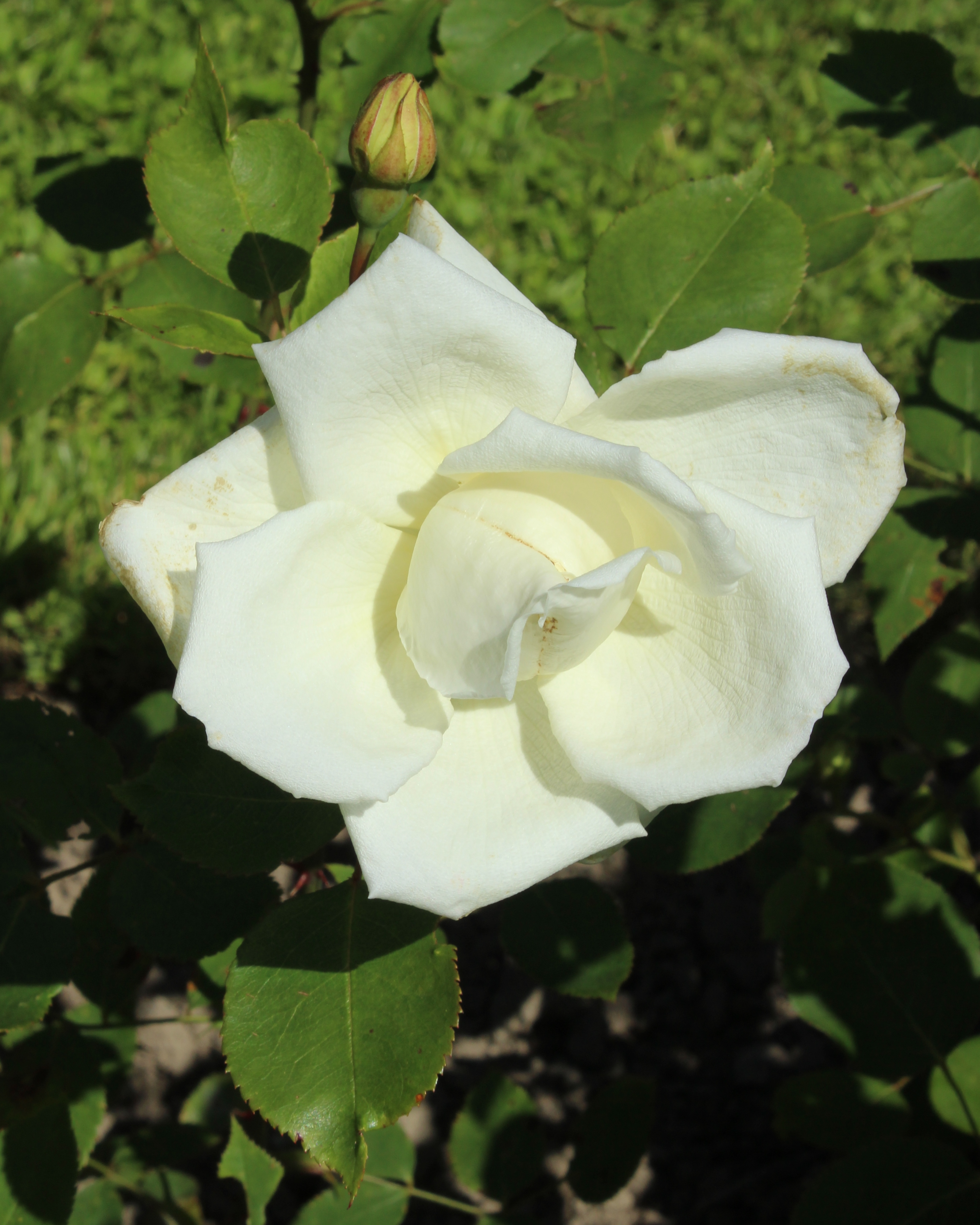
'Kaiserin Auguste 'Viktoria', Lambert 1891

- The Empress of Germany's bird of paradise, Paradisaea raggiana augustavictoriae, was named in her honour.
- The Augusta Victoria Hospital in Jerusalem was built by Wilhelm II and named after her.
- There is a white rose cultivar named after her, the Kaiserin Auguste Viktoria (Peter Lambert, 1891).

== Sources ==
- Radziwill, Catherine (1915). The Royal Marriage Market of Europe. New York: Funk and Wagnalls Company. OCLC 457445686.
- Van der Kiste, John: The last German Empress: A life of Empress Augusta Victoria, Consort of Emperor William II. CreateSpace, 2015
- Thomas Weiberg: … wie immer Deine Dona. Verlobung und Hochzeit des letzten deutschen Kaiserpaares. Isensee-Verlag, Oldenburg 2007, ISBN 978-3-89995-406-7.

Augusta Victoria of Schleswig-Holstein House of Schleswig-Holstein-Sonderburg-Augustenburg Cadet branch of the House of Oldenburg Born: 22 October 1858 Died: 11 April 1921
German royalty
Preceded by Victoria, Princess Royal	German Empress consort Queen consort of Prussia; 15 June 1888 – 9 November 1918	Monarchy abolished German revolution
Titles in pretence
Loss of title Republic declared	— TITULAR — German Empress consort Queen consort of Prussia; 9 November 1918 – 11 April 1921	Vacant Title next held by Princess Hermine Reuss of Greiz
