= Deichmann =

Deichmann (lit. 'dike man') is a German topographic or occupational surname. Deichmann or Deichman may refer to:

== Deichmann ==
=== People ===
- Elisabeth Deichmann (1896–1975), Danish-American marine biologist
- Freya Deichmann (1911–2010), participant in the Kreisau Circle, an anti-Nazi resistance group
- Heinrich Deichmann (born 1962), German entrepreneur
- Johannes Pedersen Deichmann (1790–1832), Norwegian politician
- Jonas Deichmann (born 1987), German adventurer and extreme athlete
- Paul Deichmann (1898–1981), German World War II Luftwaffe general and recipient of the Knight's Cross of the Iron Cross
- Wilhelm Ludwig Deichmann (1798–1876), German banker
- Yannick Deichmann (born 1994), German professional footballer

=== Other uses ===
- Deichmann SE (formerly Heinrich Deichmann-Schuhe GmbH), the largest retailer of shoes and sportswear in Europe
- Deichman Library, a municipal public library serving Oslo, Norway
- Deichman Śląsk Wrocław, a football club from Wrocław, Poland
