= Marie Simon =

German-Sorbian nurse (1824–1877)

- Marja Simonova
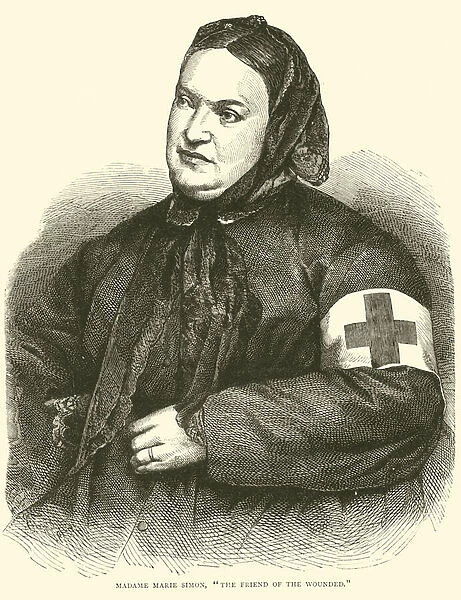
- Portrait by Edmund Ollier, 1871
- Born: Marie Jannasch; 26 August 1824; Doberschau, Kingdom of Saxony
- Died: 20 February 1877 (aged 52); Loschwitz, Kingdom of Saxony, German Empire
- Resting place: Trinity Cemetery, Dresden
- Years active: 1866–1877
- Spouses: Herr Rohseck (divorced); Friedrich Anton Simon (m. 1853)
- Children: 1

Marie Simon (Upper Sorbian: Marja Simonowa; née Jannasch (Janašec); 26 August 1824 – 20 February 1877) was a Sorbian nurse who co-founded the Albert Association, a precursor to the German Red Cross, following her experience as battlefield nurse during the Austro-Prussian War. She later became one of the principal German nurses of the Franco-Prussian War, organizing the nursing staff and food distribution at the military hospital in Nancy. Simon later established several medical facilities in Dresden and devoted the rest of her life to the training of new nurses. She was highly regarded in Germany, with a contemporary physician referring to her as the "Saxon Florence Nightingale".

== Biography ==
Marie Jannasch was born on 26 August 1824 in the predominately Sorbian village of Doberschau in the Kingdom of Saxony. Born out-of-wedlock to Anna Jannasch, her father was allegedly a shepherd from Göda named Johann Haucke. She was primarily raised by her maternal grandfather Johann Jannasch, a local innkeeper, and was Protestant. She attended elementary school in Gnaschwitz, where she learned German; prior to this, Sorbian was the only language she spoke. Orphaned at age 11, she spent much of her adolescence in the neighboring Austrian Empire. Sometime around this period, she was married to a man surnamed Rohseck, though they later divorced. In 1852, she moved to Dresden in Saxony and married Friedrich Anton Simon, a white goods merchant, the following year. Together they ran a lingerie store on the Altmarkt, and their daughter Olga Eugenie later married Saxon court photographer Hugo Engler. She received a nursing education through internships at the Deaconess Institute Dresden and the University Hospital Leipzig, and was granted Saxon citizenship in 1863.

Simon was a volunteer nurse during the Austro-Prussian War of 1866, and was present in the aftermath of the Battle of Königgrätz, where over 900 wounded soldiers had been left in the field without medical care. Returning several days later with a large stock of supplies, she tended to the wounded for 17 weeks. In 1867, Simon and Carola of Vasa co-founded the Albert Association, a precursor to the German Red Cross named for Carola's husband Crown Prince Albert. Carola personally appointed Simon to the board of directors, where she was tasked with supervision over the nurses – referred to as "Albertines" – and management of treatment for the poor.

During the Franco-Prussian War of 1870, Simon and twelve other Albertines were embedded with the German army. Present at the Siege of Metz and the Battle of Sedan, she then proceeded to Nancy, a major rail depot which had the largest military hospital in the entire German network. In addition to tending to wounded soldiers, she "organized the deployment of nursing staff" and oversaw the distribution of food at the hospitals. In total, she served from 5 August 1870 to 11 March 1871. Simon was highly regarded for her actions during the war, and was awarded the Order of Sidonia from Saxony; the Order of Franz Joseph from Austria; and the Cross of Merit for Women and Girls from Prussia.

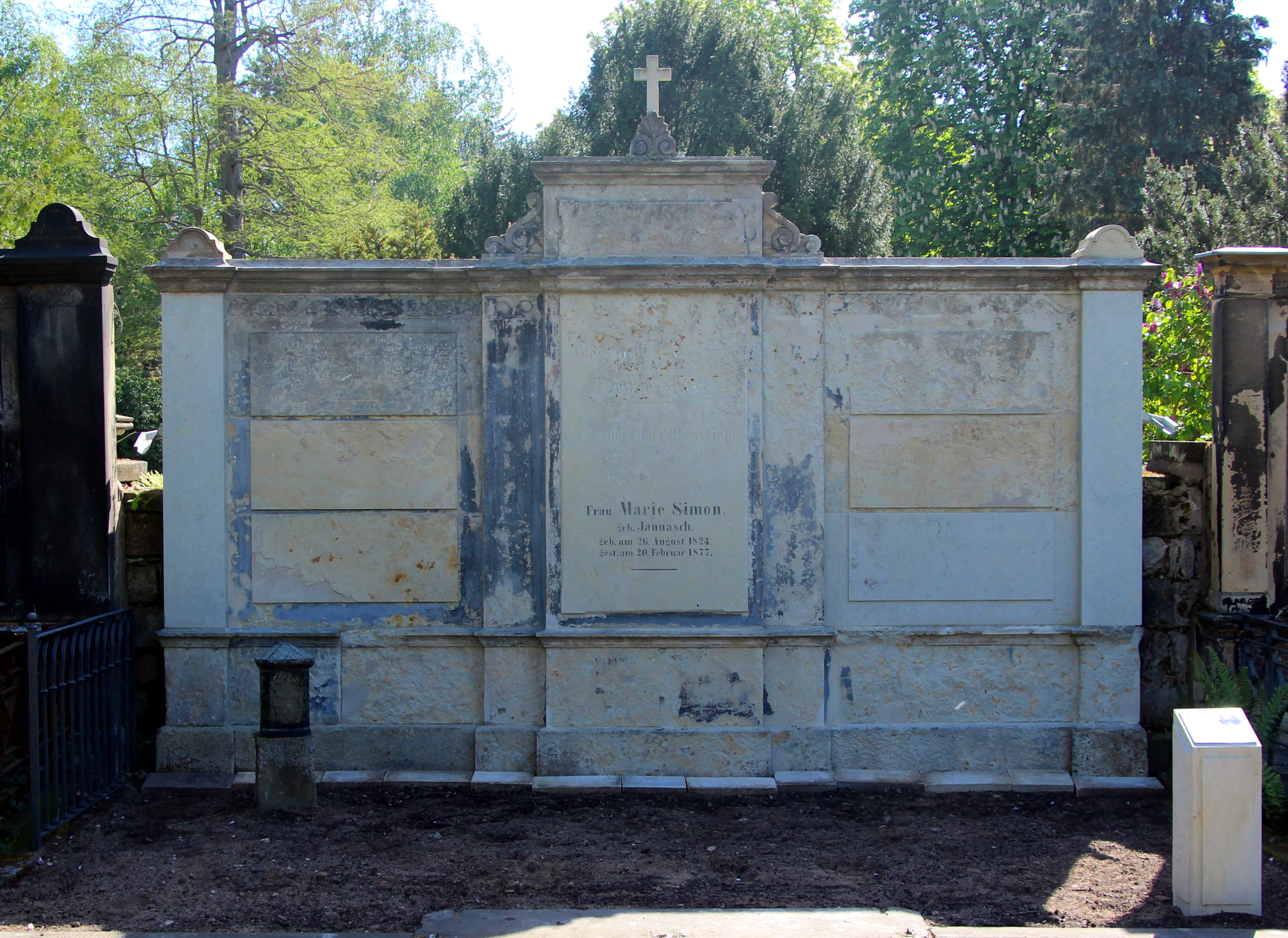
Simon's grave in Dresden

Following the war, Simon "devoted herself intensively to the training of nursing staff". Largely at her own expense, she established a sanatorium for disabled soldiers – which was also used as a training facility for nurses – in Loschwitz in 1872, as well as a polyclinic in Neustadt. In addition, she led a three-year training program for nurses, the last six months of which was under the instruction of doctors at the University Hospital Leipzig. Simon died at her sanatorium in Loschwitz on 20 February 1877, aged 52. Her funeral was held two days later with a large attendance, and she was buried in Dresden's Trinity Cemetery. Her grave, which was destroyed by Allied bombing during World War II, was restored in May 2023 with financial support from the German Red Cross and the local government.

The German Red Cross considers Simon to be "a pioneer of modern nursing" who played a key role in establishing the organization in Saxony, while contemporary physician Ludwig Mayer eulogized her as the "Saxon Florence Nightingale". In 1907, a street in Dresden was named after her. Publicist Jürgen Helfricht is writing a biography about Simon which will be published in 2024.

== Honors and awards ==
Simon was the recipient of the following honors and awards:

- Austria: Order of Franz Joseph
- Prussia: Cross of Merit for Women and Girls (1871)
- Saxony: Order of Sidonia (1871)
- Württemberg: Order of Olga

== Bibliography ==
- Simon, Marie (1872). Meine Erfahrungen auf dem Gebiete der freiwilligen Krankenpflege im Deutsch-Französischen Kriege 1870-71 [My Experiences in the Field of Voluntary Nursing in the Franco-Prussian War, 1870-71] (in German). Leipzig: F. A. Brockhaus AG.
