= Bernd Stange =

German football manager (born 1948)

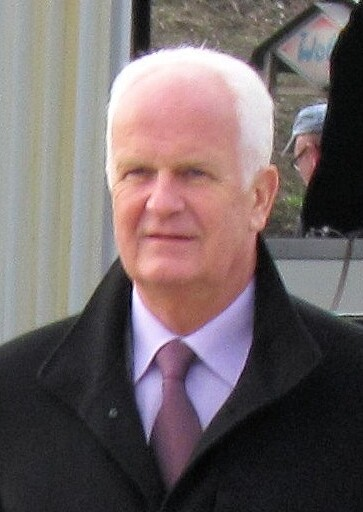
- Stange in 2012

Personal information
- Full name: Bernd Walter Stange
- Date of birth: 14 March 1948 (age 78)
- Place of birth: Gnaschwitz, Soviet occupation zone in Germany
- Height: 1.86 m (6 ft 1 in)
- Position: Defender

Senior career*
Years	Team	Apps	(Gls)
1957–1965	Chemie Gnaschwitz		
1965–1966	Vorwärts Bautzen		
1966–1970	HSD DHfK Leipzig		

Managerial career
- 1970–1971: Carl Zeiss Jena (youth team)
- 1971–1978: Carl Zeiss Jena (assistant)
- 1978–1980: East Germany U21
- 1980–1982: East Germany (assistant)
- 1982–1984: East Germany Olympic
- 1983–1988: East Germany
- 1989–1991: Carl Zeiss Jena
- 1991–1992: Hertha BSC
- 1993–1994: VfB Leipzig
- 1995–1996: Dnipro Dnipropetrovsk
- 1996: CSKA-Borysfen Kyiv
- 1997–1998: Carl Zeiss Jena
- 1998–2001: Perth Glory
- 2001: Oman
- 2002–2004: Iraq
- 2005–2007: Apollon Limassol
- 2007–2011: Belarus
- 2013–2016: Singapore
- 2018–2019: Syria
- * Club domestic league appearances and goals

Bernd Walter Stange (born 14 March 1948) is a German football manager who last managed the Syria national team.

During his playing career, he played for Chemie Gnaschwitz, Vorwärts Bautzen, and HSG DHfK Leipzig as a defender.

== Playing career ==
Born in Gnaschwitz, Doberschau-Gaußig, a Sorbian town of Saxony, Stange started playing at an early age and was called into the East German youth team. He continued to play for Chemie Gnaschwitz in the lower divisions until 1965 followed by a year at Vorwärts Bautzen. In 1966 he joined HSG DHfK Leipzig, playing until retiring in 1970, while also studying at the DHfK Leipzig (de) to become a sports teacher.

== Coaching career ==
=== 1970–91: Carl Zeiss Jena and East Germany national team ===
Upon completing his sports teacher degree, Stange went into coaching with Carl Zeiss Jena in 1970, winning the GDR Cup in 1973 and 1974 as assistant coach of Hans Meyer.

He was head coach East Germany Olympic Team from 1982 to 1984. They were undefeated in qualifying for the 1984 Olympic games.

In late 1983, he was appointed head coach of East Germany after years working as assistant coach and head coach of the Under 21s. After a mediocre five-year spell with the national team without qualifying for a World Cup or European Championship final tournament, Stange returned, now as head coach in the GDR league, to FC Carl Zeiss Jena, in the autumn of 1989.

=== 1991–94: Hertha BSC and VfB Leipzig; Stasi informer ===
Stange moved to coach Hertha BSC where his old ties as an informant for the East German police, the Stasi, surfaced. He was an 'Inoffizieller Mitarbeiter', which translates as 'unofficial employee'. His code name was 'IM Kurt Wegner'. His tasks included informing the Stasi about his players' views of the government and whether any of them were breaking the law by making contact with West Germans. He was sacked after these allegations surfaced.

=== 1995–2001: Coaching abroad and third stint at Jena ===
After losing his job at VfB Leipzig, in 1995 he joined FC Dnipro Dnipropetrovsk. In 1996 Stange briefly joined CSKA-Borysfen Kyiv, but had to leave before the start of the season due to a scheme organized by leadership of the Professional Football League of Ukraine and the Football Federation of Ukraine (at the time headed by Hryhoriy Surkis).

In 1998, he joined Perth Glory in the Australian National Soccer League. Glory under Stange in 2000 finished on top of the NSL league ladder however failed in the Grand Final, losing on penalties to the Wollongong Wolves after leading 3–0 at half-time. Stange was very popular among supporters in Perth to the point where a demonstration was held to prevent him from being sacked. However, his abrupt nature with players and other club officials made him a number of enemies, leading to his departure at the completion of his contract.

=== 2001–04: Oman and Iraq ===
In 2001, he was given the opportunity to guide Oman to the 2002 FIFA World Cup Korea/Japan but was fired after less than three months in the job.

Amid threats from the US President George W. Bush of a possible military conflict with Iraq, he arrived in Baghdad in October 2002 and put pen to paper to a four-year contract that included two clauses allowing him to leave in the event of war and to refuse any political comment.

=== 2005–16: Final years and retirement ===
In 2005 Stange joined Apollon Limassol in Cyprus and helped them to avoid relegation. The following season Apollon won unbeaten the Cypriot Championship after 12 years. Also, Apollon won the Super Cup a few months later for the first time. He continued for the 2006–07 season but resigned in the middle of that season because his team was not doing well and lost its chance to win the Championship again.

On 30 July 2007, Stange was appointed by the Belarus Football Federation to coach the national team after previous manager Yuri Puntus resigned the month before due to a poor performance in the Euro 2008 qualifying. For his first game on 22 August, against Israel, Stange, to the surprise of fans and media called up many young players from the domestic league. His debut ended in a 2–1 impressive victory despite questionable positioning of players on the field.

On 7 October 2011, Stange stood down from his post after the end of the UEFA Euro 2012 qualifying campaign.

Bernd Stange has often commented on his desire to eventually settle in Perth with his wife Dorothea.

On 15 May 2013, Stange was unveiled as the head coach of Singapore national football team. He openly criticized Singapore players for their lack of fitness and refusal to meet him personally for further fitness drills. Under his tutelage Singapore performed badly as they were eliminated from the 2014 AFF Championship where the "Lions" were a host nation. There were high expectations for the "Lions" because they won the last edition (2012). Despite that on 16 June 2015, they tied Japan 0–0 in a goalless draw at Saitama Stadium 2002.

Stange ended his stint with Singapore in April 2016.

Stange retired on 14 July 2016.

=== 2018: Return from retirement; Syria ===
In January 2018, the Syrian Football Association announced that from February 2018, Stange would be the new coach for the Syrian national team.

His salary was about 35 Thousand dollars which was about 30 times more than the former manager of the team Ayman Hakeem who managed the team during the final phase of 2018 FIFA World Cup qualification and led the team to the knockout stage. The salary was criticized many times by the press considering the situation in Syria, the poor results and performance of the team in 2019 Asian Cup and even in the friendly matches that preceded the tournament.

After heavy criticism and a poor showing during the first two matches of the 2019 AFC Asian Cup, which ended in a 0–0 draw against minnows Palestine and a sound 2–0 defeat from neighbours Jordan, the Syrian FA announced that Stange would be sacked immediately and replaced.

== Current manager statistical summary ==
The following table provides a summary of Stange as the Belarus, Singapore, and Syria manager, including in friendlies and competitive matches.

As of 10 January 2019

Teams	Years	P	W	D	L	Win %
Belarus	2007–2011	49	17	14	18	34.69
Singapore	2013–2016	22	7	3	12	31.82
Syria	2018–2019	7	1	4	2	14.29

Key: P–games played, W–games won, D–games drawn; L–games lost, %–win percentage
