= Hedwig von Rittberg =

Prussian-German nurse, nursing supervisor

Auguste Leopoldine Hedwig Countess of Rittberg
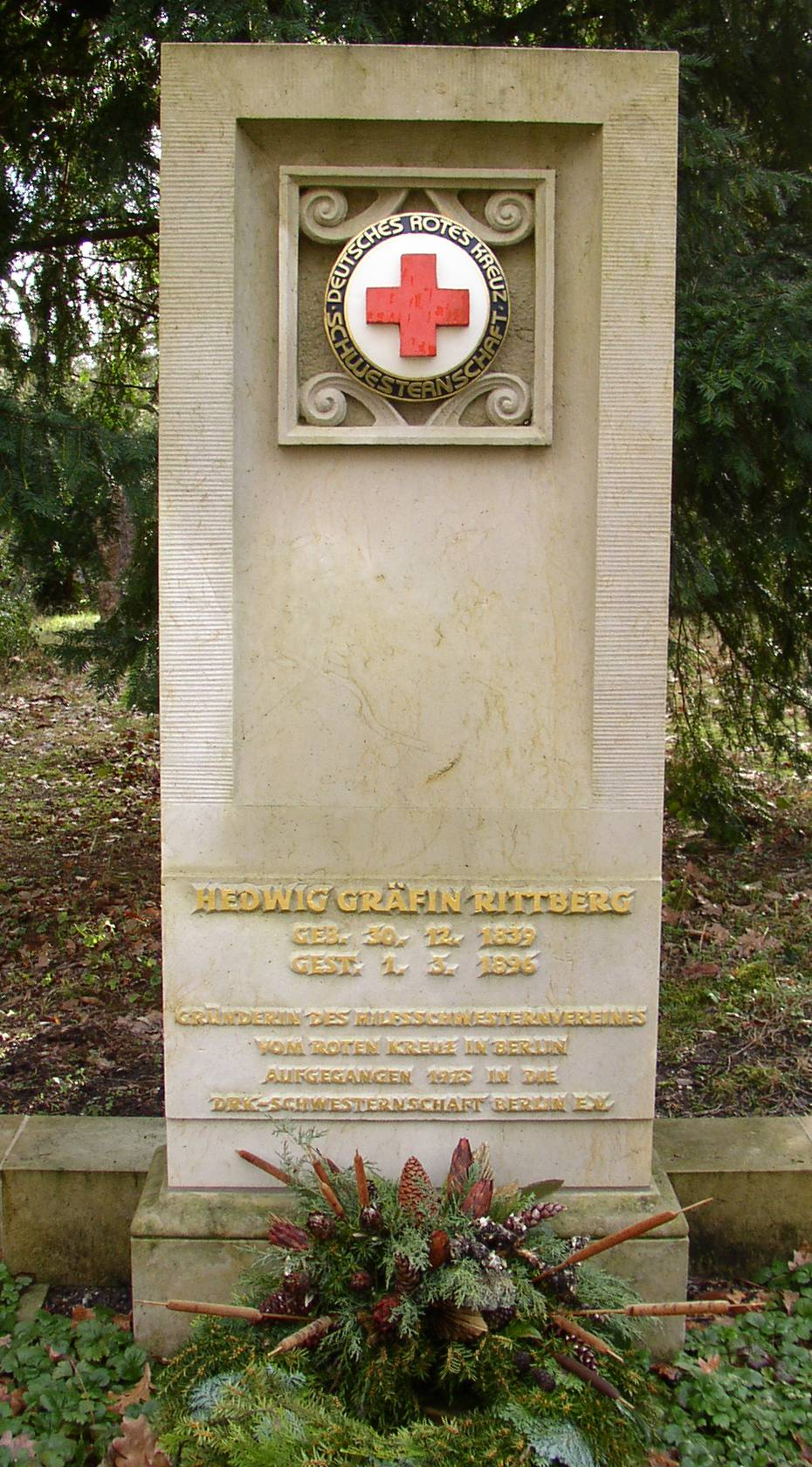
- Grave of Hedwig von Rittberg in Potsdam-Babelsberg
- Born: 30 December 1839; Liegnitz
- Died: 4 April 1896 (aged 56); Potsdam-Babelsberg, Germany
- Burial place: Klein-Glienicke cemetery
- Occupations: Nurse, hospital supervisor
- Parents: August von Rittberg (father); Henriette von Netz (mother)

Auguste Leopoldine Hedwig Countess of Rittberg (1839–1896) was a Prussian-German decorated nurse, hospital supervisor and founder of the Auxiliary Sisters Association.

== Life and work ==
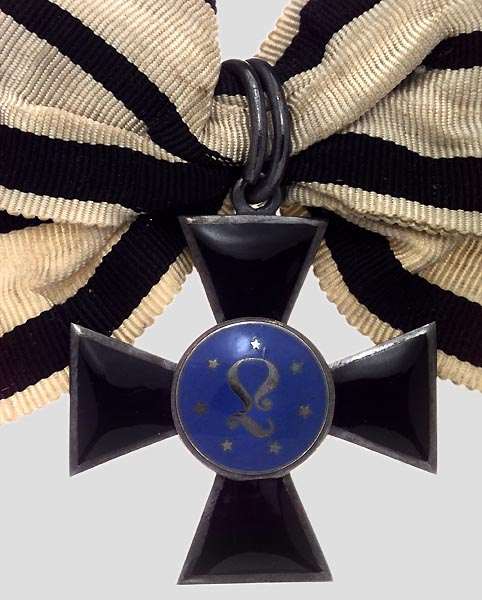
Order of Louise, First Class

Hedwig von Rittberg was born 30 December 1839 in Liegnitz in Silesia to the Prussian major Count August von Rittberg and Henriette von Netz. She was the youngest of eleven children. After her father rejected her wish to become a deaconess, she took care of sick relatives. With the outbreak of the Austro-Prussian War (1866) the young countess took up nursing and completed a course in the cuirassier barracks in Breslau, now Wrocław, Poland. In appreciation for her nursing service in Hořice and Gitschin during the three-month war, she received the Order of Louise, 1st class.

After the war, Rittberg returned to her parents' house to care for her relatives and, at the insistence of her family, she joined Tschirnau Abbey as a canoness, but she did not remain long because in 1870, the Prussian Queen Augusta asked her to become superior of the newly built Augusta Hospital in Berlin. There she cared for German and French wounded combatants during the Franco-Prussian War (1870–1871), for which she received the War Medal for Non-Combatants, the Cross of Merit of France and the Bavarian Cross of Merit for Women and Girls.

In 1873, Rittberg returned to Liegnitz, where she passed a pharmaceutical exam at the medical authority. On 1 October 1875, with two other sisters, she founded the Auxiliary Sisters Association in Berlin, to provide well-trained nurses for the home care of the sick regardless of class or denomination. The group was recognized in 1882 by Kaiser Wilhelm I as a public welfare institution.

In 1876 she traveled through the United States as the companion of an ailing American woman.

The Auxiliary Sisters Association was recognized as a non-profit organization in 1882. It continued to train new nurses and opened a convalescent home for old and sick sisters in Nowawes in 1886.

Rittberg died 4 April 1896 in Nowawes, now Potsdam-Babelsberg, Germany, and was buried in the Klein-Glienicke cemetery.

== Legacy ==
After the Countess died, the "Auxiliary Sisters' Association" was renamed the "Countess Rittberg Auxiliary Sisters' Association" and then renamed again becoming the "Countess Rittberg Sisters' Association of the Red Cross." In 1975, the association officially became part of the German Red Cross of Berlin. Coincidentally, Rittberg had been an early advocate for an international organization such as the Red Cross to care for the sick and wounded.

The Rittberg Hospital on Carstennstrasse in Lichterfelde was named after the countess. Originally built in 1904 as a homeopathic hospital, it had to close during the First World War. In 1918, under the direction of Elsbeth von Keudell (1857–1953), the Red Cross Sisterhood of Rittberg bought the hospital and trained nurses there. In the course of the hospital reform in 1995, the Rittberg Hospital was closed and stood empty until 1999. Since 2001, the General Secretariat of the Red Cross has used it as its headquarters.
