= Order of Elizabeth =

Austrian Imperial and Royal Order of Knighthood

Imperial Austrian Order of Elizabeth
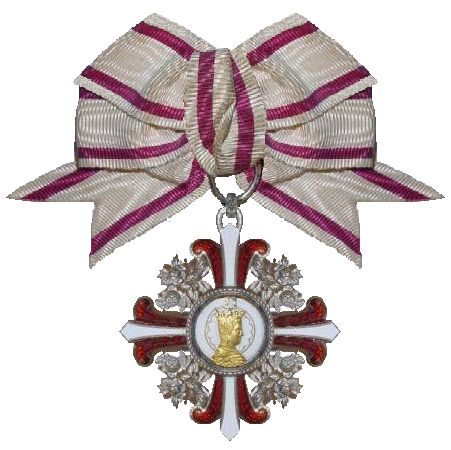
- Insignia of the order's third grade
- Type: Order of chivalry for women
- Established: 17 September 1898; 1898 - 1918 (National Order); 1918 - present (Dynastic Order); 17 November (Feast day)
- Royal house: Habsburg-Lorraine
- Religious affiliation: Roman Catholic
- Awarded for: General welfare in Religious, Charitable or Philanthropic Merit
- Status: Dormant since 1951
- Grades: Grand Cross; 1st Class; 2nd Class; Elizabeth Medal

Statistics
- First induction: 1898: Countess Irma Sztáray de Sztára et Nagymihály
- Last induction: 1951: Princess Regina of Saxe-Meiningen
- Total inductees: 1121

Precedence
- Next (higher): Order of Leopold
- Next (lower): Order of Franz Joseph
- Equivalent: Order of the Iron Crown
- Ribbon of the order

The Imperial Austrian Order of Elizabeth (German: Kaiserlich österreichischer Elisabeth-Orden), established in 1898 by Francis Joseph, Emperor of Austria and King of Hungary, was an order created for women. The order was named after Saint Elisabeth of Hungary, but it was also founded to honor and memorialize Francis Joseph's late wife, Empress-Queen Elisabeth.

The order was divided into three grades – Grand Cross, 1st Class and 2nd Class. In addition, there was an Elizabeth Medal for civil merit.

== Overview ==
According to medal expert and collector Yuri Yashnev:

The award was intended for ladies, regardless of social status or religion, for merits in religious and charitable work. The award had four degrees - the Grand Cross, I Degree and II Degree, and also a cross of merit... Awards were made, personally, by the emperor... the badges and insignia of the Order were to be returned to the state upon the death of the member, or upon the advancement from a lower degree to a higher degree... There were 81 awards of the Grand Cross, 332 awards of the I Degree, 500 awards of the II Degree, and 208 awards of the Elizabeth Medal for merit, between 1898 and 1918, when the Order was disbanded with the collapse of the monarchy.

== Notable recipients ==
=== Austrian ===
- Archduchess Gisela of Austria
- Princess Isabella of Croÿ
- Archduchess Maria Annunciata of Austria
- Maria Christina of Austria
- Archduchess Marie Valerie of Austria
- Sophie, Duchess of Hohenberg
- Irma Sztáray

=== Foreign ===
- Alexandra of Denmark
- Augusta Viktoria, German Empress
- Duchess Cecilie of Mecklenburg-Schwerin
- Charlotte of Schaumburg-Lippe
- Emma of Waldeck and Pyrmont
- Princess Irene of Hesse and by Rhine
- Duchess Marie of Mecklenburg-Schwerin
- Marie, Queen of Romania
- Mary of Teck
- Milena of Montenegro
- Stephanie of Belgium
- Princess Thyra of Denmark
- Victoria of Baden
- Victoria Eugenie, Queen of Spain
- Anne Weightman
- Wilhelmina of the Netherlands
