= Order of Theresa =

Order of noblewomen in the Kingdom of Bavaria

Order of Theresa Theresien-Orden
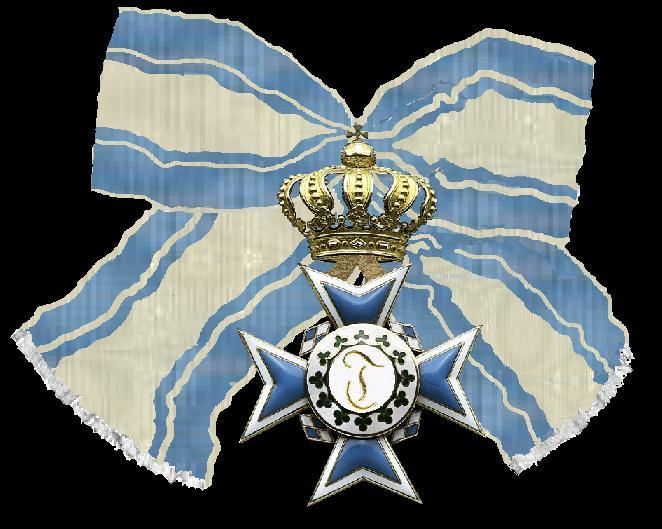
- Badge and ribbon of the order

Awarded by Kingdom of Bavaria
- Type: Order of chivalry for women
- Established: 12 December 1827
- Royal house: House of Wittelsbach
- Motto: Our life is Faith in Eternity
- Status: House Order
- Founder: Queen Therese of Bavaria
- Sovereign: Franz, Duke of Bavaria
- Grand Mistress: Princess Elisabeth
- Chancellor: Princess Sophie
- Grades: Grand Mistress; Lady of Honour; Lady
- Ribbon bar of the order

The Order of Theresa was an order for noble ladies in the Kingdom of Bavaria. It continues to function today as an honorary society to which belong the princesses of the House of Wittelsbach as well as other ladies from Bavarian noble families.

== History ==
The order was founded on 12 December 1827 by Queen Therese of Bavaria, wife of King Ludwig I of Bavaria. She established an endowment which paid an annual pension (prebend) to twelve unmarried noble ladies, six of whom received 300 guilders and six of whom received 100 guilders. The pension ceased when a member married; if, however, the marriage was according to the rank of the member, then the lady was permitted to continue to wear the insignia of the order and be known as an Ehrendame (Lady of Honour).

Various other ladies also held the rank of Ehrendame including all the princesses of the House of Wittelsbach. Bavarian ladies paid a reception fee of 55 guilders while foreign ladies paid 220 guilders.

The insignia of the order is worn on the left breast and consists of a blue-enameled Maltese cross with a wide white edge, over which is placed a gold royal crown. In the four angles of the cross are lozenges with the blue-and-white arms of Bavaria. At the centre of the cross is a gold bordered white circular medallion decorated with the letter T. On the back of the medallion is the year 1827 and the motto of the order "Unser Erdenleben sey Glaube an das Ewige" (Our life on Earth may be Faith in Eternity).

The ribbon of the order is white with two sky-blue stripes at the edge, the inner stripe being narrower than the outer stripe. The sash of the order is a similarly coloured broad ribbon, worn diagonally from the right shoulder to the left hip.

Among the current Ladies of Honour of the order is the Hereditary Princess of Liechtenstein.

== Recipients ==
=== Grand Mistresses ===
- Queen Therese of Bavaria (1827–1854)
- Queen Marie of Bavaria (1854–1889)
- Princess Ludwig of Bavaria, later Queen Maria Theresia of Bavaria (1889–1919)
- Crown Princess Antonia of Bavaria (until 1954)
- Duchess Maria of Bavaria, first wife of Duke Albrecht of Bavaria (until 1969)

=== Dames ===
- Princess Alexandra of Saxe-Altenburg
- Princess Alexandrine of Baden
- Princess Amalie of Saxe-Coburg and Gotha
- Infanta Amalia of Spain
- Amélie of Leuchtenberg
- Princess Antoinette of Saxe-Altenburg
- Princess Augusta of Saxe-Meiningen
- Augusta Victoria of Schleswig-Holstein
- Princess Cecilia of Sweden
- Daisy, Princess of Pless
- Elena of Montenegro
- Elisabeth of Bavaria, Queen of Belgium
- Giovanna of Italy
- Archduchess Gisela of Austria
- Princess Hildegard of Bavaria
- Princess Irmingard of Bavaria
- Isabella II of Spain
- Infanta Isabel, Countess of Girgenti
- Princess Isabella of Croÿ
- Julia, Princess of Battenberg
- Princess Louise d'Orléans
- Princess Louise of Prussia
- Infanta María de la Paz of Spain
- Princess Maria Elisabeth of Bavaria
- Infanta Maria Josepha of Portugal
- Maria Sophie of Bavaria
- Infanta María Teresa of Spain
- Duchess Marie Gabrielle in Bavaria
- Duchess Marie of Mecklenburg-Schwerin
- Empress Shoken
- Duchess Sophie Charlotte in Bavaria
- Princess Sophie of Sweden
- Sophie, Hereditary Princess of Liechtenstein
- Princess Tatiana Alexandrovna Yusupova
- Princess Beatrice of Bourbon
