= Ladies Merit Cross =

Award for women working with charity, or in a religious or social field

Ladies Merit Cross Frauenverdienstkreuz
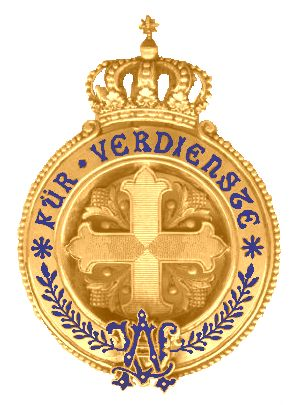
- Badge of the order.
- Type: Ladies Order
- Country: Prussia
- Royal house: House of Hohenzollern
- Ribbon: White
- Sovereign: Emperor Wilhelm II
- Grand Mistress: Empress Augusta Victoria
- Grades: First Class; Second Class
- Ribbon of the order

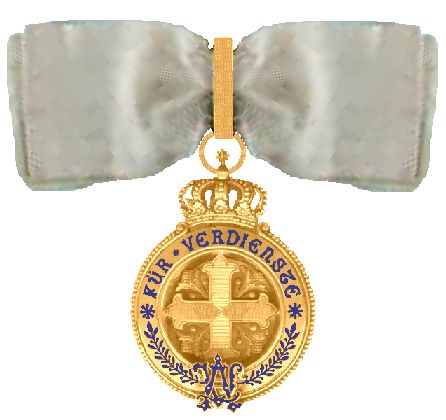
Ladies Merit Cross, First Class.

The Ladies Merit Cross (Frauenverdienstkreuz) was founded on 22 October 1907 by King William II of Prussia as a two-class Ladies Order and to reward women and young women, who worked in the field of charity, or in a religious or social field, who rendered outstanding had personal self-sacrificing service. The award was ranked just behind the Order of Louise. To be awarded the first class, a member must have held the second class for ten years. In exceptional cases, this requirement could be waived. The insignia were returnable upon death.

== Description of the award ==
The badge is made of gold in the first class and of silver for the second class medallion. In the center is a cross fleury with stylized cornflowers between the arms of the cross. The medallion is framed by a string of pearls and is surmounted by a crown. On the edge of the medallion is the blue enameled inscription FÜR VERDIENSTE (For Merit). On the lower half of the edge are laurel branches flanking the intertwined letters AV (Augusta Victoria). The insignia of the order was worn on a white bow on the left chest.
