= Elsbeth von Keudell =

German nurse, first responder

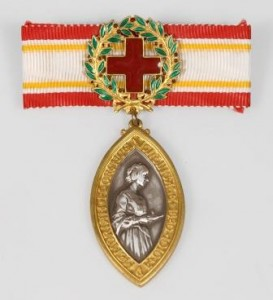
- Florence Nightingale Medal
- Born: 21 May 1857; Tilsit, Russia
- Died: 4 April 1953 (aged 95); Berlin-Lichterfelde, Germany
- Occupations: Nurse, first responder
- Known for: Florence Nightingale Medal

Elsbeth von Keudell (1857–1953) was a German nurse and senior coordinator of the Countess Rittberg Sisters' Association of the Red Cross. She was one of the first people to receive the Florence Nightingale Medal for her service to those in need.

== Life and work ==
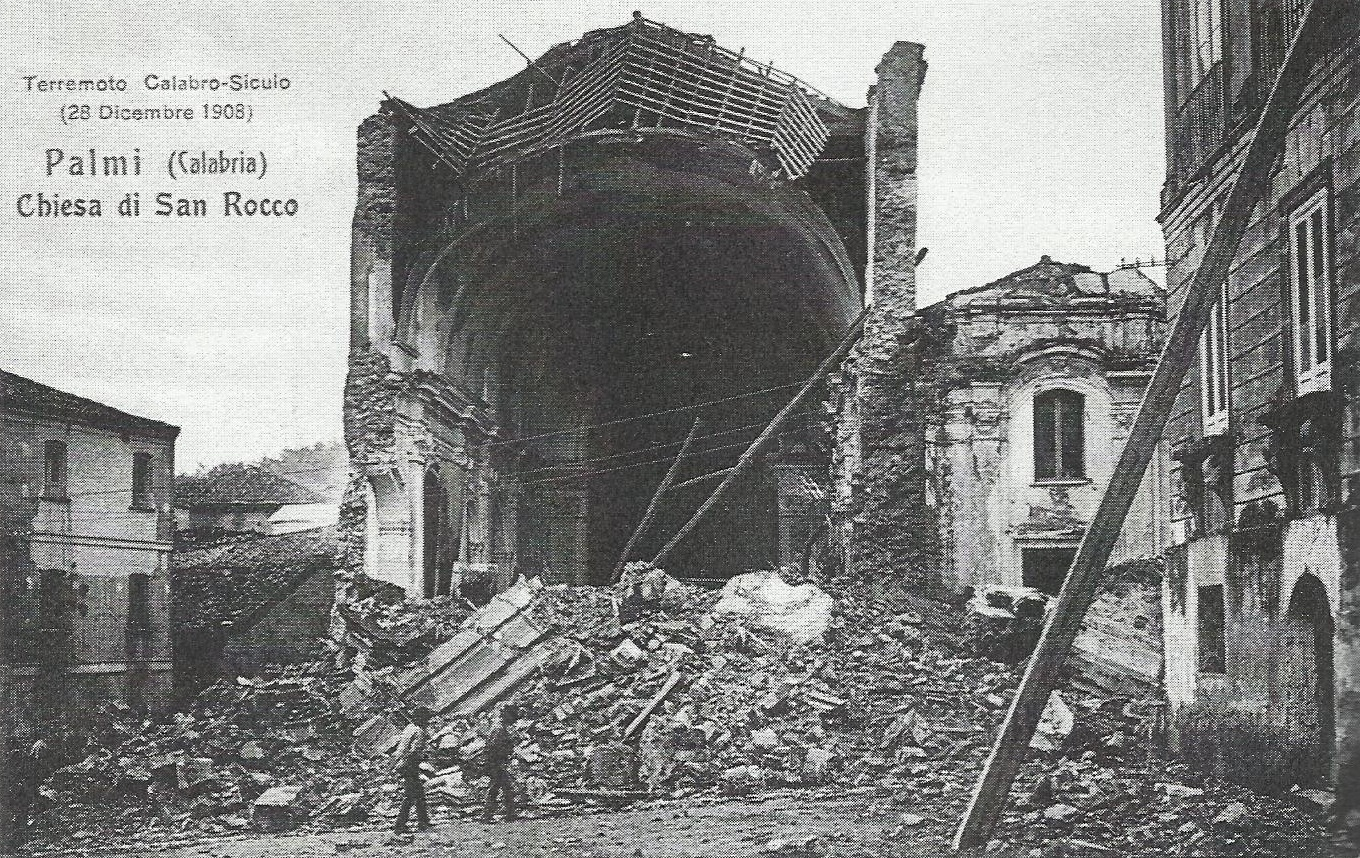
Typical devastation from the 1908 earthquake in southern Italy.

Keudell was born 21 May 1857 in Tilsit, Kahlingrad, Russia as the youngest daughter of an officer and landowner and she was trained as a nurse at Berlin's Charité Hospital. From 1902 to 1903 she was head nurse at the surgical clinic of the hospital in Magdeburg-Altsta, Germany. She was one of the first nurses in the country to receive additional training to become a superior at the Red Cross school founded by Clementine von Wallmenich. Keudell passed the exam in early 1904, and on 1 May, she took over management of the Countess Rittberg Sisters' Association of the Red Cross, named for its founder Hedwig von Rittberg, in Berlin-Lichterfelde. (In 1975, the organization became part of the German Red Cross.)

Keudell gained public notoriety when the German Red Cross (DRK) was asked, for the first time, to respond to a natural disaster outside the country. On 28 December 1908, a 7.1 magnitude earthquake and tsunami destroyed the city of Messina on the island of Sicily causing massive casualties and destroying access routes to the area. Only 48 hours later, Keudell arrived in Syracuse and led a relief expedition with five other sisters to offer care for the many wounded people there. Soon, the DRK, under Keudell's supervision, sent 37 railway carriages and the steamer Illyria, laden with barracks, tents and other supplies to aide efforts there.

Later, during the First World War, She was responsible for the coordination of around 300 sisters in her association for voluntary war nursing. In 1920 Keudell was awarded one of the first Florence Nightingale Medals in recognition of her dedication during the earthquake as well as her work during the war. The medal, still awarded every two years, remains the highest award given to nurses worldwide.

Keudell resigned from the management of the association on 1 July 1929, and her successor was Alexandrine Countess of Üxküll-Gyllenband. In 1930 Keudell published a biography of Clementine von Wallmenich, who had greatly influenced her career in her early years.

Keudell died on 4 April 1953 in Berlin-Lichterfelde, Germany.
