= Civil Order of Saxony =

Civil Order of Saxony Zivilverdienstorden
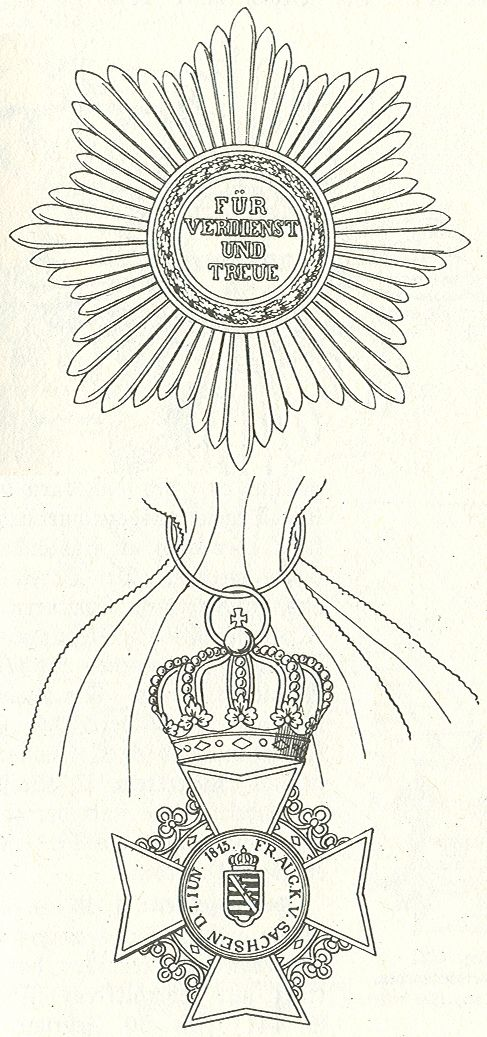
- Star and grand cross of the order
- Type: Civil Order of Merit
- Awarded for: service to the state for civil virtue
- Presented by: Kingdom of Saxony
- Eligibility: Saxon civilians
- Status: Obsolete
- Established: 7 June 1815
- Final award: 1918
- Ribbon of the order

Precedence
- Next (higher): Albert Order
- Next (lower): Order of Sidonia

The Civil Order of Saxony, also known as the Saxon Order of Merit, was established on 7 June 1815 by King Frederick Augustus I of Saxony. It was a general order of merit for the royal subjects of the Kingdom of Saxony for distinguished civic service and virtue.

== Classes of the order ==
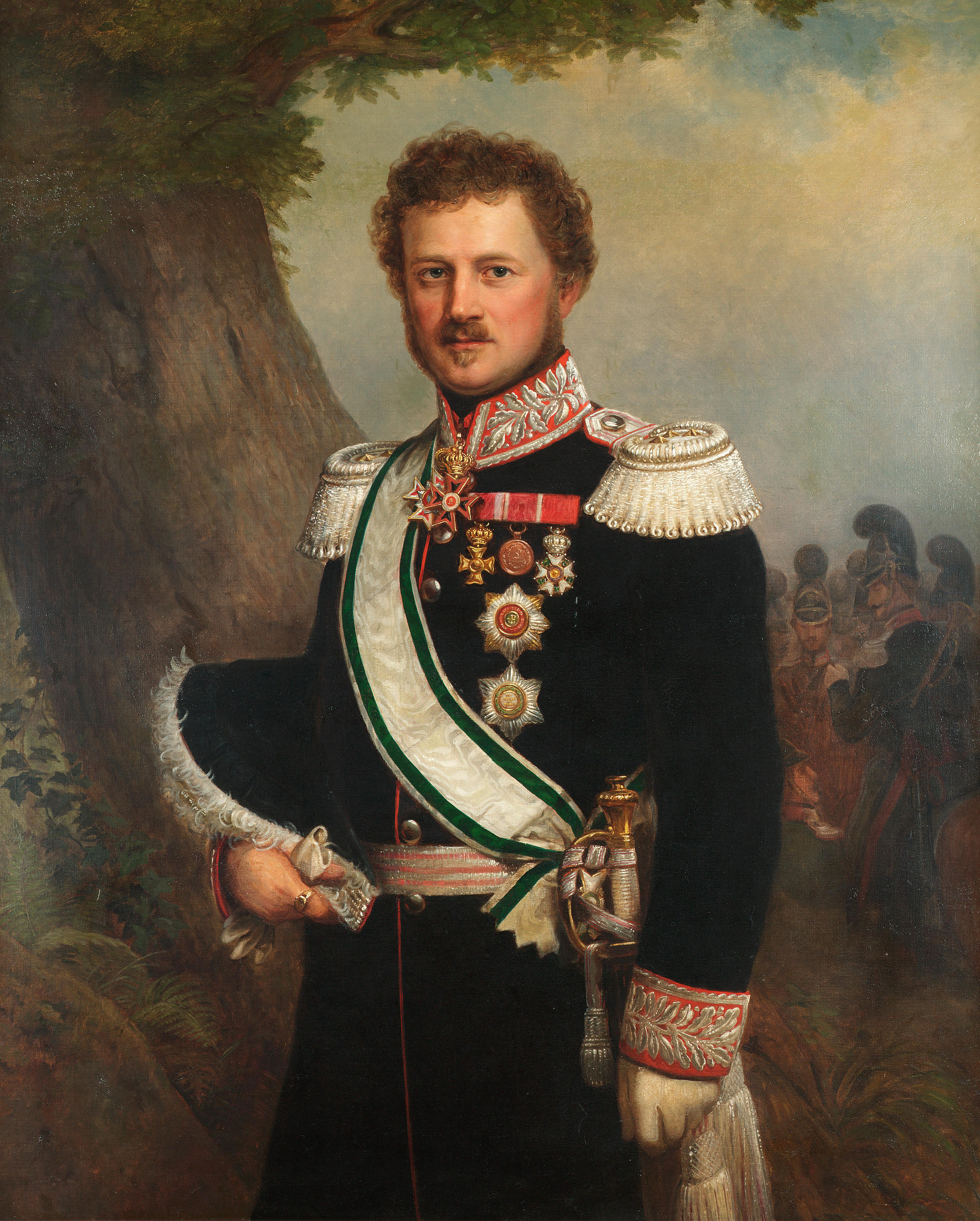
Prince Emil von Hessen und bei Rhein, Knight Grand Cross

Upon its founding in 1815, the order was divided into seven classes of merit:

- Knight Grand Cross
- Commander First Class
- Commander Second Class
- Knight
- Small Cross
- Gold Civil Medal
- Silver Civil Medal

With an amendment of 18 March 1858, the Small Cross became the Cross of Honour, eventually becoming Knight Second Class on 31 January 1876. The decree also replaced the gold and silver medals with civilian crosses of distinction, in gold and silver. The classes of the order thus became:

- Knight Grand Cross
- Commander First Class
- Commander Second Class
- Knight First Class
- Knight Second Class
- Golden Civil Cross
- Silver Civil Cross
