= Elisabeth Deichmann-Schaaffhausen =

German aristocrat and hostess (1811 – 1888)

Lilli Deichmann-Schaaffhausen
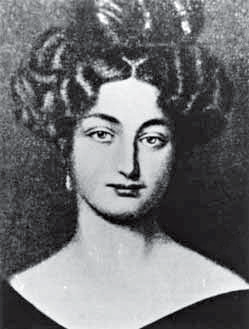
- Born: May 13, 1811; Cologne
- Died: July 4, 1888 (aged 77); Bonn
- Spouse: Wilhelm Ludwig Deichmann
- Children: eleven

Elisabeth (Lilli) Deichmann-Schaaffhausen (13 May 1811 – 4 July 1888) was a German aristocrat who became an ophthalmologist and a citizen of Liechtenstein. She was known as a hostess and she managed to study at a university many years before women were allowed to attend.

== Life ==
Deichmann-Schaaffhausen was born in Cologne in 1811. Her father was the German banker Abraham Schaaffhausen and her mother was his second wife Maria Therese Lucie (born de Maes). She was one of the last of their six children. Her mother was active in public life supporting girls' schools and art societies in Cologne.

She married a wealthy banker, Wilhelm Ludwig Deichmann, and in 1853 they moved to a castle near Bonn called Schloss Deichmannsaue. They had eleven children. She owned a number of artworks as a painting of hers by Nicolas-Antoine Taunay and another by Jean-Louis Demarne are known to have been in her collection.

Their home was a salon and the guests included the Crown Prince of Prussia and the composers Clara Schumann, Franz Liszt, Johannes Brahms and Max Bruch. She remarkably became an ophthalmologist.

In 1878 she gained the citizenship of Liechtenstein.

== Honours ==
In 1873 she was given the Royal Württemberg Order of Olga and at that time she already had the Cross of Merit for Women and Girls

The violinist and musicologist Wilhelm Joseph von Wasielewski dedicated his 1869 book The Violin and its Masters to "Mrs. Lilla Deichmann née Schaaffhausen ... in grateful homage".

There was a biography and image of her published in 1875. Deichmann-Schaaffhausen died in Bonn in 1888.
