= Cross of Merit for Women and Girls =

Cross of Merit for Women and Girls Ehrenkreuz für Frauen und Jungfrauen
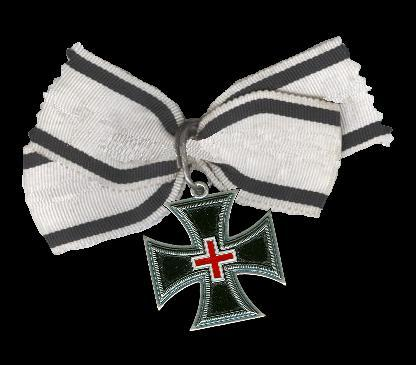
- Awarded for: self-sacrificing work for the good of the fighting troops and their families
- Country: Prussia
- Presented by: King of Prussia
- Eligibility: Prussian women and girls
- Campaign: Franco-Prussian War
- Established: 22 March 1871

Highlights
- Total: 2979
- Ribbon of the cross
- Related: Iron Cross

The Cross of Merit for Women and Girls, or literally Women and Virgins (Ehrenkreuz für Frauen und Jungfrauen), was created on 22 March 1871 by Kaiser Wilhelm I, German Emperor, in his capacity as King of Prussia. The award was presented only to women, but was not a Ladies Order in the most narrow sense. Women and girls were awarded at the request of Empress Augusta, and the award was bestowed by the Kaiser.

== Description of the award ==
The appearance and shape is very similar to the Iron Cross, but on the obverse at the junction of the arms is an emblem of the Red cross. On the reverse there is the royal crown above the intertwined monograms "A" and "W" and the date of 1870–1871. The cross was worn from suspended by a bow on the left chest. The ribbon is the same as that of the Iron Cross for non-combatants, white with black stripes at the edge.

== Recipients ==
- Princess Louis of Hesse and by Rhine (26 June 1871)
- Countess Hedwig von Rittberg (1871)
- Marie Simon (1871)
- Elisabeth Deichmann-Schaaffhausen
