= Orders of chivalry for women =

Orders of chivalry which are reserved solely for women

Orders of chivalry for women, orders of knighthood for women or ladies orders are orders of chivalry reserved solely for women. These knighthoods for women made their first appearance in 1600, and have been less numerous than traditional knighthoods reserved for men.

Though many kingdoms, such as Great Britain or the Netherlands, allow both men and women to be invested with the same orders of knighthood, orders in other kingdoms were exclusive for men. Several of these kingdoms eventually established orders for the exclusive membership of women. Tradition frequently called upon the reigning queen or empress, queen or empress consort to serve as the Grand Mistress of their respective all-female, royal or imperial orders. In other cases, the king or emperor is the sole male member of the order, acting in his role as the sovereign or master of all orders established and conferred within his kingdom or empire. A high number of female orders existed in Germany, Austria and Russia.

== List of Ladies' orders ==
The following list of orders that were established for the sole or primary membership of women:

=== Austria ===
- Order of Elizabeth
- Order of the Starry Cross

=== Egypt ===
- Order of the Virtues (Egypt)

=== France ===
- Order of the Ladies of the Cord

=== Germany ===
Bavaria

- Order of Theresa
- Order of Saint Elizabeth

Prussia

- Order of Louise
- Ladies Merit Cross

Saxony

- Order of Sidonia

Württemberg

- Order of Olga

=== Greece ===
- Order of Beneficence
- Order of Saints Olga and Sophia

=== Japan ===
- Order of the Precious Crown

=== Korean Empire ===
- Order of the Auspicious Phoenix

=== Ottoman Empire ===
- Order of Charity

=== Persia ===
- Order of Aftab
- Order of the Pleiades

=== Portugal ===
- Order of Saint Isabel

=== Philippines ===
- Order of Gabriela Silang

=== Russia ===
- Order of Saint Catherine

=== Spain ===
- Order of Queen Maria Luisa

=== United Kingdom ===
- Order of the Crown of India
