= Wilhelm Ludwig Deichmann =

German banker

Wilhelm Ludwig Deichmann (3 August 1798 in Rodenberg – 23 November 1876 in Bonn-Mehlem) was a German banker.

Wilhelm was the third son of the mayor and district judge Konrad Deichmann (1769–1838). He was fifteen years old when he volunteered to fight in the Wars of Liberation. He completed a commercial apprenticeship in Bremen and then took up a position at the A. Schaaffhausen'scher Bank Association. When Abraham Schaaffhausen died in 1824, the firm was initially taken over by his son-in-law Louis Mertens, who had difficulty taking the firm forward. However, on 26 May 1830 Deichmann married Elisabeth Schaaffhausen, another daughter of Abraham Schaaffhausen and became head of the firm when Mertens resigned. Freya von Moltke was his great granddaughter.
