= Johannes Pedersen Deichmann =

Norwegian politician

Johannes Pedersen Deichmann (1790 – 14 April 1832) was a Norwegian politician.

He was elected to the Norwegian Parliament in 1830, representing the constituency of Drammen. He worked as a shoemaker and farm owner in that city. He sat through only one term.
