= Klein Glienicke =

Neighbourhood of Potsdam, Germany

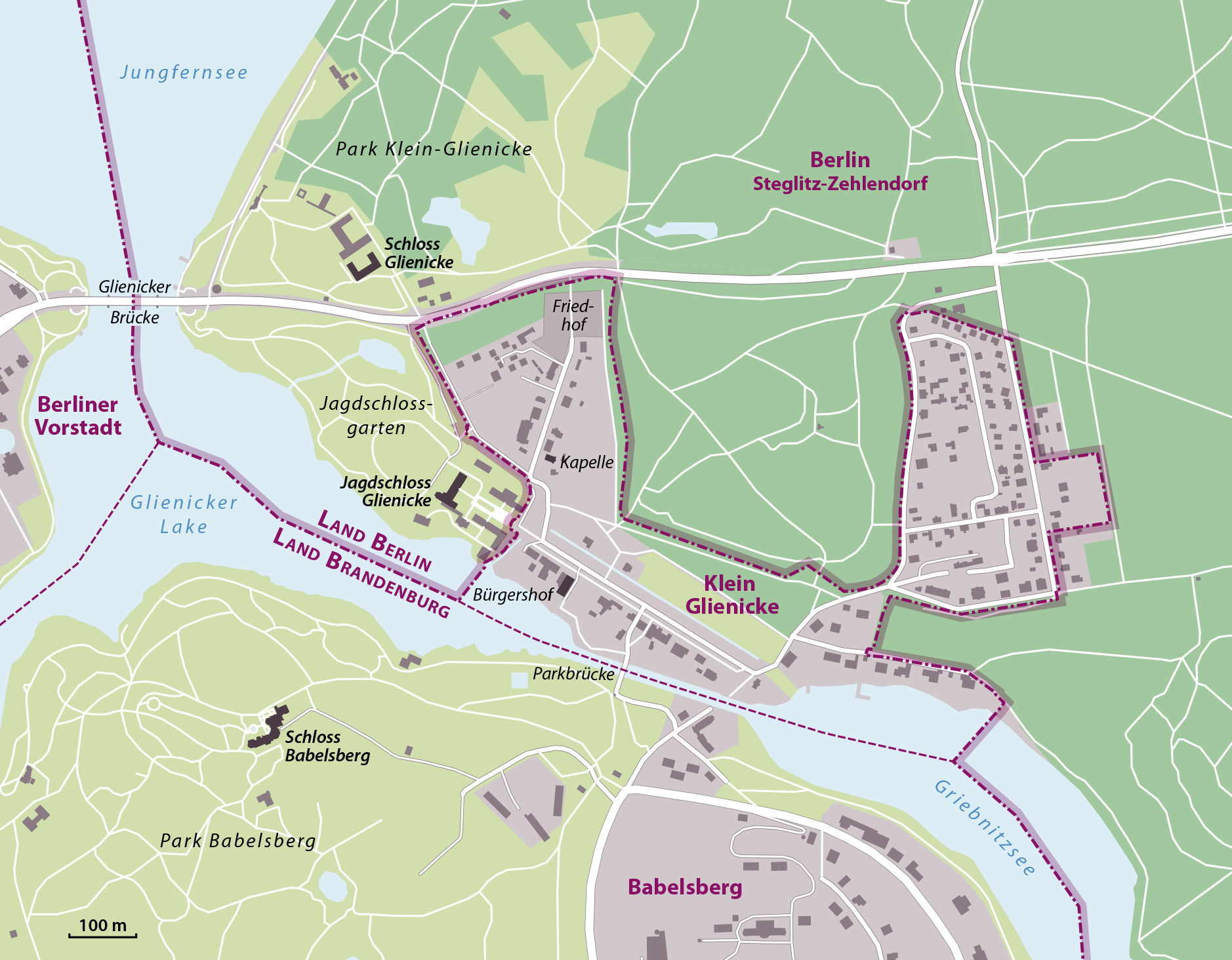
Klein Glienicke on a Potsdam map

Klein Glienicke (German pronunciation: [klaɪn ˈɡliːnɪkə], lit. 'Little Glienicke') is a locality of the city of Potsdam, Germany. It lies immediately south-west of Berlin-Wannsee in the area of Wannsee. The historic centre includes the former hunting lodge Jagdschloss Glienicke.

== History ==
=== Early development ===
Klein Glienicke developed as part of the wider Glienicke estate landscape associated with Prussian royal estates and park planning in the Berlin–Potsdam cultural region. From the 18th century, the area was integrated into forestry and estate structures linked to nearby court residences.

In the 19th century, the settlement remained small and closely tied to the Glienicke palace and park ensemble. Its development reflected its position between Berlin and Potsdam and its role within estate service and maintenance economies.

Contemporary administrative and cadastral records relating to land use, estate organisation, and municipal governance are held in the holdings of the Brandenburg state archival system, including the Brandenburgisches Landeshauptarchiv (BLHA).

=== 20th century and Cold War division ===
Following 1945, Klein Glienicke became part of the Soviet occupation zone and subsequently the German Democratic Republic. Due to the post-war division of Berlin and surrounding areas, the settlement became geographically separated from the rest of East Germany and surrounded by West Berlin territory, effectively forming an exclave of the GDR.

Documentation of post-war border arrangements, administrative classification, and security status is preserved in holdings of the Bundesarchiv (Federal Archives of Germany), including records relating to border administration and the Ministry for State Security (MfS) regional structures.

During the Cold War, Klein Glienicke was classified as a restricted border zone within the GDR border regime. Access was tightly controlled by East German border authorities, and movement between Klein Glienicke and surrounding West Berlin areas was restricted to a guarded crossing via a bridge connection.

Research literature and archival material describe Klein Glienicke as part of the wider system of Berlin border enclaves, whose governance was shaped by security regulations and special administrative provisions in the border zone.

=== Post-reunification ===
Following German reunification in 1990, border installations were dismantled and the area was reintegrated into unified municipal structures under Brandenburg and Potsdam administration.

The locality forms part of the UNESCO World Heritage Site Palaces and Parks of Potsdam and Berlin, inscribed in 1990 and extended subsequently, recognising the cultural landscape of Prussian palaces, parks, and associated settlements.

== Present day ==
Klein Glienicke is now a residential locality characterised by preserved 19th-century villas and estate architecture, including Swiss-style houses, within the wider protected cultural landscape of Potsdam and Berlin.
