= Order of Queen Maria Luisa =

Order of merit for women

Royal Order of Noble Ladies of Queen Maria Luisa Real Orden de las Damas Nobles de la Reina María Luisa
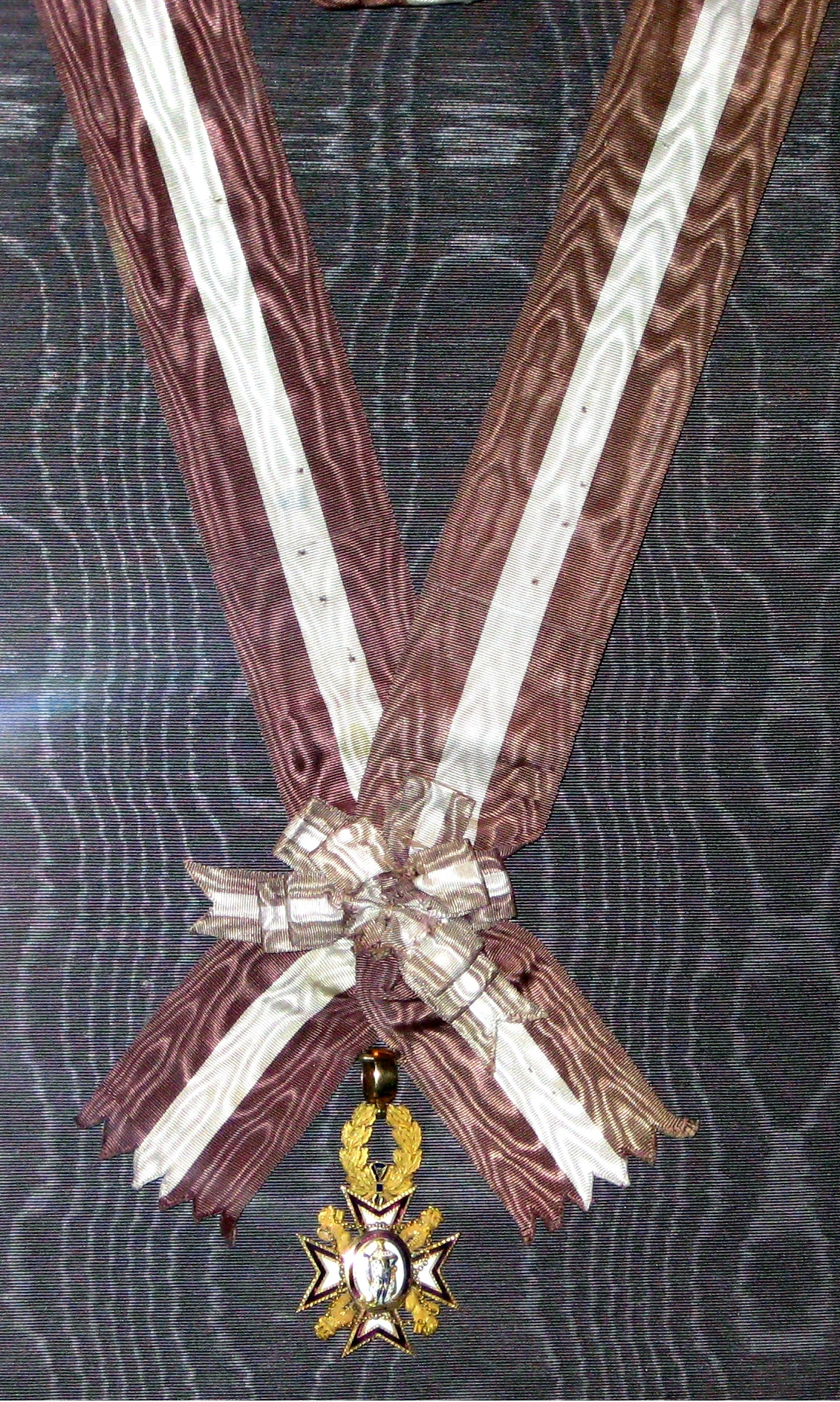
- Badge of the Order Sash of the Order, belonging to the Empress Maria Alexandrovna of Russia
- Type: Order of knighthood for women
- Established: 1792; 234 years ago
- Country: Kingdom of Spain
- Royal house: House of Bourbon
- Ribbon
- Sovereign: King Felipe VI
- Grand Mistress: Queen Letizia (de facto)
- Grades: Dame-Grand-Cross; Dame

Precedence
- Next (higher): Royal and Distinguished Spanish Order of Charles III
- Next (lower): Royal Order of Isabella the Catholic

The Royal Order of Noble Ladies of Queen Maria Luisa is an Order created by King Charles IV of Spain by royal decree on April 21, 1792, at the request of his wife, Queen Maria Luisa, to reward noble women who distinguished themselves for their services and talents. As such, it was established as an honour reserved only for women.

== History ==
The Order was defined as a strictly female reward system, ruled by the Queen and composed of thirty members reserved for the Spanish high nobility. The first secretary of the Order was Don Miguel de Bañuelos y Fuentes, retired Knight of the Order of Charles III, and General Stewart of the Army.

In 1796 the King raised the Order to a nobiliary dignity, granting their holders and their spouses the protocolar treatment of excellence, equating to Grandee of Spain and Knights Grand Crosses of the Order of Charles III. Later, during the short reign of Joseph Bonaparte (Joseph I of Spain), a decree was signed on September 18, 1809, dissolving all military orders, including the female one of Maria Luisa, excepting only the order of the Golden Fleece, but this measure was reversed after Bonaparte's expulsion from Spain and the Bourbon restoration. Successive queens in turn inherited the prerogatives of the founding queen of the Order and the custom was established that the current queen of Spain would exercise the governorship of the Order.

In a Royal Decree of October 28, 1851, a payment of 3,000 reales was required of members of the Order, to be paid within three months; non-payers would cease to be members. Also included in the protocol for granting the authorization of the Council of Ministers and published in the Gaceta de Madrid (now Boletín Oficial del Estado). In 1869, after the dismissal of Queen Isabella II, the ruler, General Francisco Serrano, 1st Duke of la Torre changed the name of the Order to Order of the Nobles Ladies of Spain.

King Alfonso XII, by Royal Decree of November 28, 1878, declared that the Noble Ladies could wear the cross of the Order in a less formal way on the left side of the chest, except on occasions important enough to require its use in the form prescribed by the Order's statutes.

A Republican decree of July 24, 1931, without expressly referring to this Order, abolished in fact as an official institution. But both King Alfonso XIII, until January 1941, and his son Juan de Borbón, Count of Barcelona gave some bands of this Order to some princesses of his family; the latest to his daughters, Infantas Infanta Pilar, Duchess of Badajoz and Infanta Margarita, Duchess of Soria, to commemorate their eighteenth birthday. It was also granted to Princess Sophia of Greece when she became Princess of Spain by her marriage to the future King Juan Carlos I in 1962; she wore the Dame's version at his proclamation ceremony on November 22, 1975.

Currently, and according to the statutes, there is a single category of Noble Lady, limited to 30 members except on the express will of the monarch. Since the resignation of Don Juan de Borbón, Count of Barcelona to his dynastic rights on May 14, 1977, during the reign of Juan Carlos I, there have been no new appointments so that, although it formally remains in effect, it can be considered that this order is de facto extinct.

== Patronage and feast days ==
The patronage of the Order was entrusted to Saint Ferdinand, king of Castile and León and Saint Louis, king of France and during their feast days, May 30 and August 25 respectively, the Queen received protocolarly the Ladies in chapter. As well, the Noble Ladies of the Order were statutorily recommended special devotion to their patron saints and had to visit once a month a charity establishment, such as the Hospital de la Inclusa or some women's hospitals such as the Hospital de la Pasión.

== Investiture ==
Women rewarded by this distinction normally receive it in a formal investiture ceremony described in the statute, in the private rooms of the Queen at the Royal Palace, except in cases of serious illness or disability.

Many women from many countries have received this distinction, one of the major honors that the Spanish monarchy can award to women in recognition of their "services, actions and qualities."

== Current members ==
- HRH The Duchess of Soria – 1192nd Dame
- HM Queen Sofía of Spain – 1193rd Dame. Last dame inducted.
- HM The Queen - De facto Grand Mistress

== Notes and sources ==
- La Real Orden de Damas Nobles de la Reina María Luisa (in Spanish), published by Palafox y Pezue, Madrid, 1998, 512 pages
- Dames of the Royal Order of Queen María Luisa of Spain
