= Order of Sidonia =

Order of Sidonia Sidonien-Orden
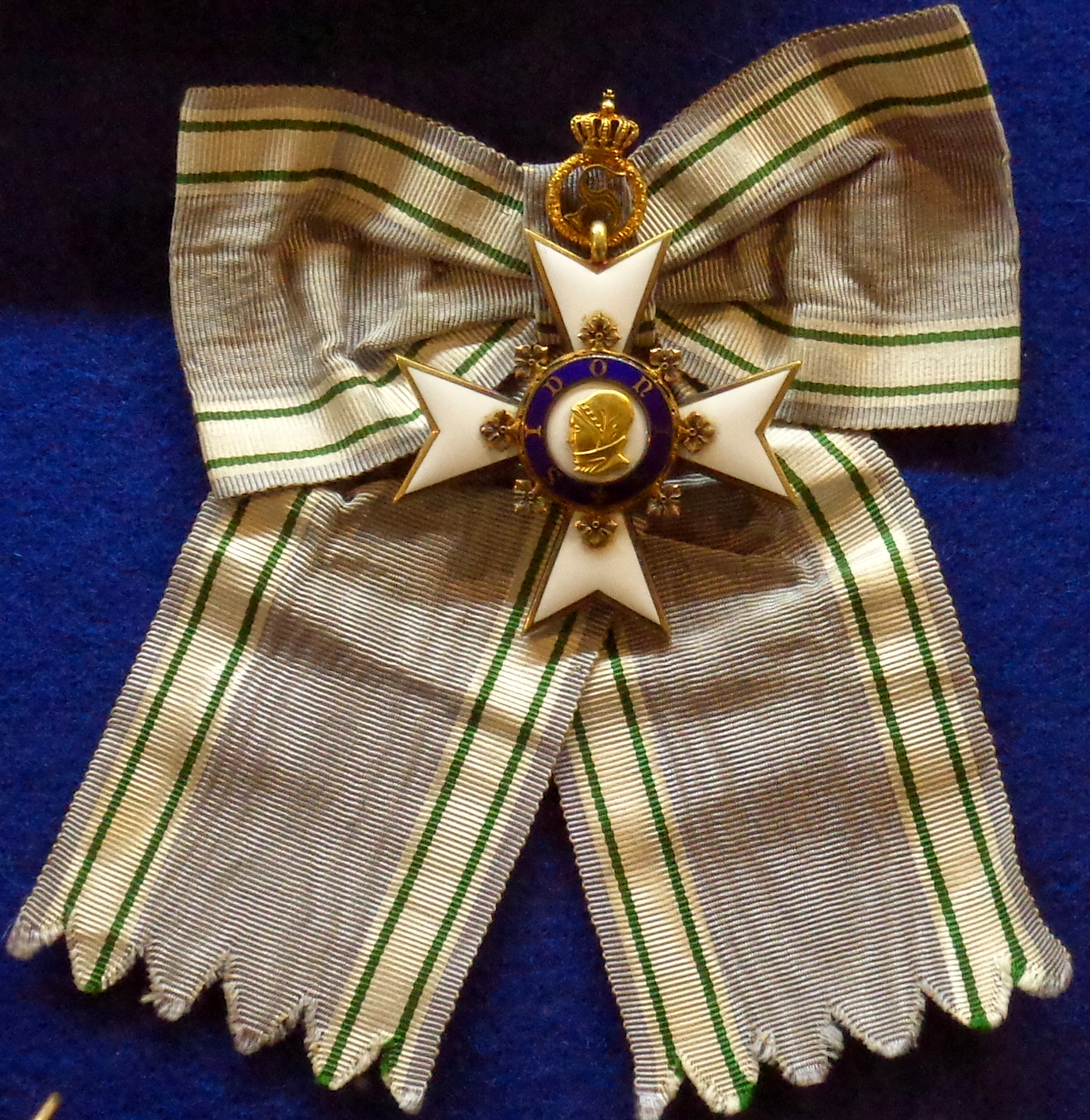
- Insignia of the order

Awarded by the King of Saxony
- Type: Chivalric order in one class
- Established: 14 March 1871
- Status: Obsolete
- Founder: John, King of Saxony
- Grades: Member

Precedence
- Next (higher): Civil Order of Saxony
- Next (lower): Order of Maria Anna
- Ribbon of the order

The Order of Sidonia was an order of chivalry of the Kingdom of Saxony, a member state of the German Empire. The order was founded on 14 March 1871 by John, King of Saxony. The order was primarily awarded to women in recognition of their dedication and self-sacrifice in caring for wounded soldiers during the Franco-Prussian War. It was the first order for women in Saxony until the establishment of the Order of Maria Anna. It was named for Sidonie of Poděbrady, wife of Albert III, Duke of Saxony, who was renowned for her virtue and piety. The order became obsolete in 1918, following Germany's defeat in World War I and the end of the monarchy.

== Insignia ==
Members of the order wore a Maltese cross of gold and enamel suspended from a purple bow with white and green stripes. On top of the central medallion, attached by an eyelet, is a crowned oak leaf wreath enclosing the monogram "S". The obverse of the central medallion depicts Duchess Sidonie in gold, surrounded by the inscription "SIDONIA". The reverse displays the royal Saxon coat of arms, and the year "1870" inscribed at the bottom.

The order consists of a single class but was worn in two different styles. Members of the royal family wore it on a sash, while others wore it with a bow.

== Sources ==
- Gritzner, Maximilian. Handbuch der Ritter-und Verdienstorden aller Kulturstaaten der Welt innerhalb des XIX. Jahrhunderts: auf Grund amtlicher und anderer zuverlässiger Quellen. Weber, 1893. pp. 448–449.
- Tagore, Rajah Sir Sourindro Mohun. The Orders of Knighthood, British and Foreign. Calcutta: The Catholic Orphan Press, 1884.
