= Doberschau-Gaußig =

Doberschau-Gaußig/Dobruša-Huska
- Municipality
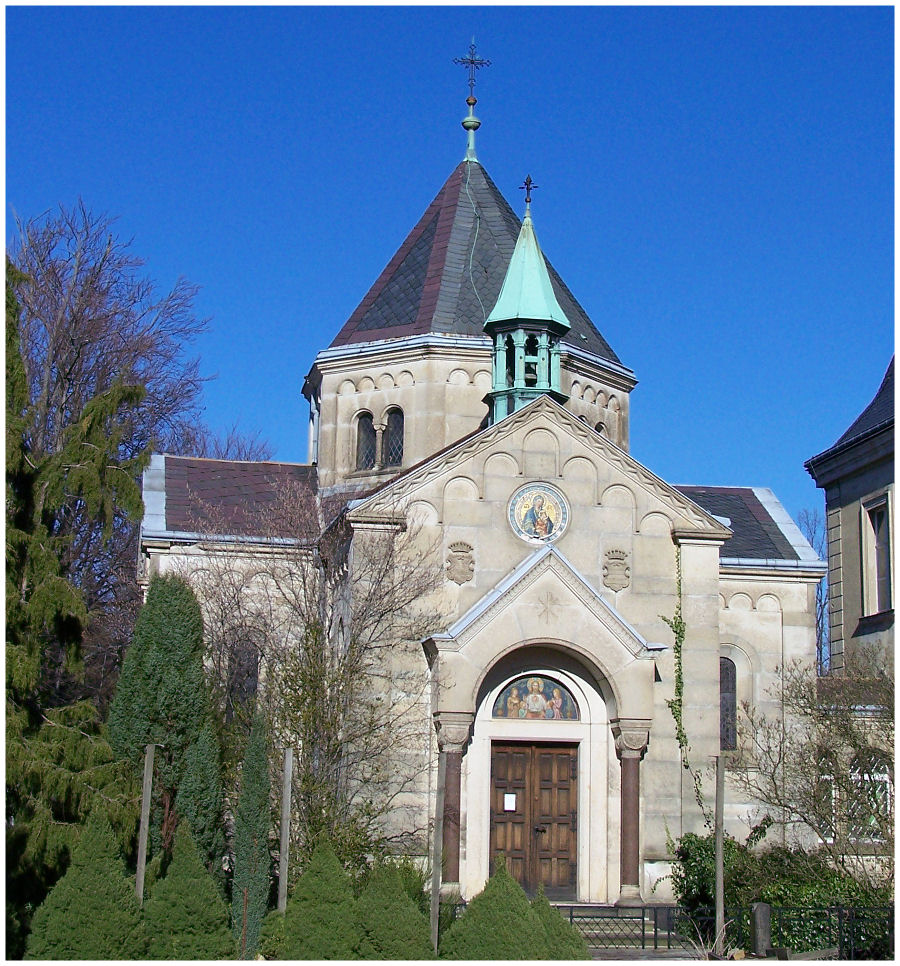
- Church in Gaußig

- Location of Doberschau-Gaußig/Dobruša-Huska within Bautzen district
- Interactive map of Doberschau-Gaußig/Dobruša-Huska
- Location within Germany Location within Saxony
- Coordinates: 51°8′30″N 14°21′26″E
- Country: Germany
- State: Saxony
- District: Bautzen

Government
  - Mayor (2023–30): Alexander Fischer (CDU)

Area
  - Total: 40.48 km^{2} (15.63 sq mi)
- Elevation: 220 m (720 ft)

Population (2025-12-31)
  - Total: 4,164
  - Density: 102.9/km^{2} (266.4/sq mi)
- Time zone: UTC+01:00 (CET)
  - Summer (DST): UTC+02:00 (CEST)
- Postal codes: 01877, 02633, 02692
- Dialling codes: 03591, 035930
- Vehicle registration: BZ, BIW, HY, KM
- Website: doberschau-gaussig.de

Doberschau-Gaußig (German) or Dobruša-Huska (Upper Sorbian, pronounced [ˈdɔbʁuʃa ˈhuska]) is a municipality in the east of Saxony, Germany. It belongs to Bautzen district and lies southwest of the town of Bautzen.

The larger part of the municipality belongs to the recognized Sorbian settlement area in Saxony. Upper Sorbian has an official status next to German, all villages bear names in both languages.

== Geography ==
The municipality is situated at the northern edge of the Lausitzer Bergland (Lusatian Hills).

== Villages ==
The following villages belong to the municipality (names given in German/Upper Sorbian, followed by the number of inhabitants):

- Arnsdorf/Warnoćicy - 152 inh.
- Brösang/Brězynka - 67 inh.
- Cossern/Kosarnja - 91 inh.
- Diehmen/Demjany - 229 inh.
- Doberschau/Dobruša - 1181 inh.
- Drauschkowitz/Družkecy - 68 inh.
- Dretschen/Drječin - 113 inh.
- Gaußig/Huska - 618 inh.
- Gnaschwitz/Hnašecy - 318 inh.
- Golenz/Holca - 95 inh.
- Grubschütz/Hrubjelčicy - 264 inh.
- Günthersdorf/Hunćericy - 109 inh.
- Katschwitz/Kočica - 42 inh.
- Naundorf/Nowa Wjes - 361 inh.
- Neu-Diehmen/Nowe Demjany - 40 inh.
- Neu-Drauschkowitz/Nowe Družkecy - 38 inh.
- Preuschwitz/Přišecy - 51 inh.
- Schlungwitz/Słónkecy - 249 inh.
- Techritz/Ćěchorjece - 89 inh.
- Weißnaußlitz/Běłe Noslicy - 78 inh.
- Zockau/Cokow - 113 inh.

== History ==
From 1952 to 1990, the constituent localities of Doberschau-Gaussig were part of the Bezirk Dresden of East Germany. On 1 January 1994, the municipality of Doberschau-Gaussig was formed by merging the municipalities of Doberschau and Gaussig.
