= Prince Ferdinand Pius, Duke of Castro =

Prince Ferdinand Pius
- Duke of Calabria, Duke of Castro

Head of the House of Bourbon-Two Sicilies
- Tenure: 26 May 1934 – 7 January 1960
- Predecessor: Prince Alfonso
- Successor: Infante Alfonso or Prince Ranieri
- Born: 25 July 1869; Rome, Papal States
- Died: 7 January 1960 (aged 90); Lindau, Bavaria, Germany
- Burial: Filialkirche St. Peter und Paul, Rieden, Swabia, Germany
- Spouse: Princess Maria Ludwiga Theresia of Bavaria (m. 1897; died 1954)
- Issue: Princess Maria Antonietta; Princess Maria Cristina; Prince Ruggiero Maria, Duke of Noto; Princess Barbara Maria; Princess Lucia, Duchess of Genoa; Princess Urraca Maria
Names
- Italian: Ferdinando Pio Maria
- House: Bourbon-Two Sicilies
- Father: Prince Alfonso, Count of Caserta
- Mother: Princess Maria Antonietta of Bourbon-Two Sicilies
- Religion: Catholic Church

Prince Ferdinand Pius (Ferdinando Pio Maria), Duke of Calabria and Castro (25 July 1869, Rome – 7 January 1960, Lindau), was head of the House of Bourbon-Two Sicilies and pretender to the throne of the extinct Kingdom of the Two Sicilies from 1934 to 1960. Professionally, he was an officer in the Spanish and Bavarian armies.

== Family ==
Ferdinand was the eldest child of Prince Alfonso, Count of Caserta and his wife Princess Maria Antonietta of Bourbon-Two Sicilies. He was a grandson of Ferdinand II of the Two Sicilies and an older brother of Prince Carlos of Bourbon-Two Sicilies, Maria Immaculata, Princess Johann Georg of Saxony, Maria Cristina, Archduchess Peter Ferdinand of Austria, Maria di Grazia, Princess Imperial of Brazil, Prince Ranieri, Duke of Castro, Prince Philip of Bourbon-Two Sicilies, and Prince Gabriel of Bourbon-Two Sicilies.

== Marriage ==
Princess Elvira of Bourbon was considered as a potential bride for Ferdinand, but he declined it in 1895. The prince also declined Elvira's sisters which enjoyed their grandmother Archduchess Maria Beatrix. Ferdinand married Princess Maria Ludwiga Theresia of Bavaria, daughter of King Ludwig III of Bavaria on 31 May 1897. They had six children:

- Princess Maria Antonietta (1898–1957)
- Princess Maria Cristina (1899–1985), married in 1948 to Manuel Sotomayor-Luna, Vice President of Ecuador
- Prince Ruggiero Maria, Duke of Noto (1901–1914)
- Princess Barbara Maria Antonietta Luitpolda (1902–1927), married in 1922 to Count Franz Xaver zu Stolberg-Wernigerode
- Princess Lucia Maria Raniera (1908–2001), married in 1938 to Prince Eugenio of Savoy, Duke of Ancona
- Princess Urraca Maria Isabella Carolina Aldegonda (1913–1999)

Ferdinand and Maria lived for many years at Villa Amsee, Lindau. It was there that he died in 1960.

== Disputed succession ==
Following Ferdinand's death, the headship of the House of Bourbon-Two Sicilies was claimed by both his nephew Infante Alfonso, Duke of Calabria, and his brother Prince Ranieri, Duke of Castro, and remains disputed between their descendants. The basis of Alfonso’s claim was that his late father, Prince Carlos of Bourbon-Two Sicilies (1870–1949), had been Ferdinand's next oldest brother. But Henri, Count of Paris, upheld the claim of Ferdinand's younger brother, Prince Ranieri, Duke of Castro (1883–1973), contending that Carlos had renounced his rights of succession for himself and his descendants in 1901 when he married the Spanish heiress presumptive María de las Mercedes, Princess of Asturias. The Count of Paris was well aware that his own claim to the French throne depended on the validity of the renunciation in 1713 of Philip V of Spain, in favor of the junior House of Orléans.

In 1900, Prince Carlos had executed the Act of Cannes, in anticipation of his marriage to María de las Mercedes, and in 1901 he became a Spanish subject and accepted the title of Infante. The position of Ranieri was that by so doing Carlos had renounced any claim to the throne of the Two Sicilies. But Alfonso had a different interpretation, which was that the Act of Cannes would have taken effect only if Mercedes and Carlos had succeeded to the Spanish throne. He also argued that the Act of Cannes was invalid under the succession rules of the house of Two Sicilies. The dispute remains unresolved.

== Military service ==
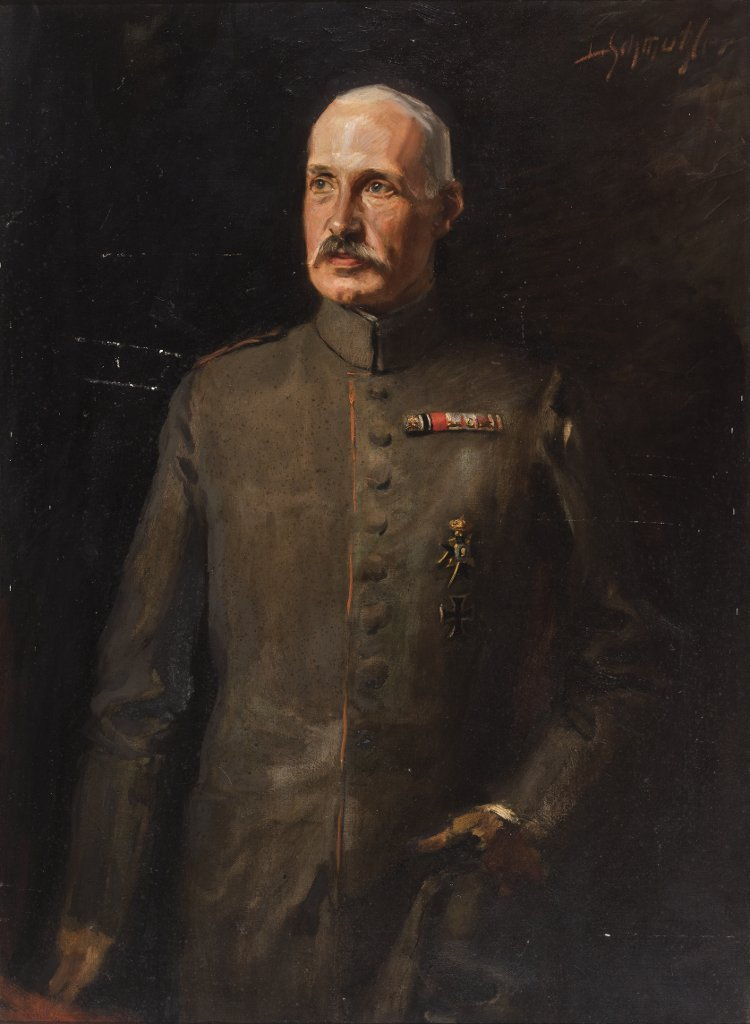
Prince Ferdinand Pius in Bavarian Army uniform with wartime awards

Ferdinand initially served in the Spanish Army, and after leaving service held the honorary rank of Comandante of the General Staff of the Spanish Army. On 1 March 1911, he was named Inhaber (honorary chief) of the Royal Bavarian 6th Field Artillery Regiment (Königlich Bayerisches 6. Feld-Artillerie-Regiment "Prinz Ferdinand von Bourbon, Herzog von Calabrien"), which was renamed in honor of him. He held the rank of Oberstleutnant à la suite of the Bavarian Army.

In World War I, he saw action initially in 1914 on the Western Front at Arras and La Bassée. On 27 May 1915, he was promoted to Oberst à la suite of the Army and on 6 June 1915 he was named Ordonnanzoffizier (aide-de-camp or orderly officer) on the staff of the newly-formed 11th Bavarian Infantry Division. The division saw action on the Eastern and Western Fronts, and in Serbia and Romania.

== Honours ==
- House of Bourbon-Two Sicilies:
  - Order of Saint Januarius, Grand Master
  - Order of Saint Ferdinand and of Merit, Grand Master
  - Sacred Military Constantinian Order of Saint George, Grand Master
  - Royal Order of Francis I, Grand Master
  - Order of Saint George and Reunion, Grand Master
- Kingdom of Bavaria:
  - Order of Saint Hubert, Knight
  - Jubilee Medal for the Bavarian Army
  - Military Merit Order, 3rd Class with Crown and Swords (3 September 1915)
  - Military Merit Order, Officer's Cross with and Swords (1 January 1918)
- Kingdom of Spain:
  - Order of the Golden Fleece, Knight
  - Order of Charles III, Knight Grand Cross
  - Order of Military Merit, 1st Class
  - Military Order of Maria Christina, 1st Class
  - Regency Medal
  - Coronation Medal in Gold
  - Commemorative Medal
  - Campaign Commemorative Medal
- Austria-Hungary:
  - Military Merit Cross, 3rd Class with War Decoration
  - Order of Saint Stephen of Hungary, Grand Cross
- Kingdom of Bulgaria:
  - Order of Saint Alexander, Grand Cross
  - Military Order for Bravery, 3rd Class, 1st Grade
- House of Hohenzollern:
  - Princely House Order of Hohenzollern, Cross of Honor 1st Class
  - Princely House Order of Hohenzollern, Cross of Honor 1st Class with Swords (19 May 1916)
- Kingdom of Italy: Supreme Order of the Most Holy Annunciation, Knight
- Sovereign Military Order of Malta: Bailiff Grand Cross of Honor and Devotion
- Ottoman Empire:
  - Liakat Medal in Gold with Sabers
  - War Medal
- Kingdom of Prussia: Iron Cross 1st and 2nd Class
- Papal States: Order of the Holy Sepulchre, Grand Cross
- Tuscany: Order of Saint Joseph, Grand Cross

== Arms ==
Heraldry of Prince Ferdinand Pius

Prince Ferdinand's arms
Until 1894

Prince Ferdinand's arms as titular heir to the throne
1894–1934

Prince Ferdinand's arms as head of the Royal House
1934–1960

== Ancestry ==
Ancestors of Prince Ferdinand Pius, Duke of Castro

8. Francis I of the Two Sicilies
4. Ferdinand II of the Two Sicilies
9. Infanta Maria Isabella of Spain
2. Prince Alfonso, Count of Caserta
10. Archduke Charles, Duke of Teschen
5. Archduchess Maria Theresa of Austria
11. Princess Henrietta of Nassau-Weilburg
1. Prince Ferdinand Pius, Duke of Castro
12. Francis I of the Two Sicilies (= 8)
6. Prince Francis, Count of Trapani
13. Infanta Maria Isabella of Spain (= 9)
3. Princess Maria Antonietta of Bourbon-Two Sicilies
14. Leopold II, Grand Duke of Tuscany
7. Archduchess Maria Isabella of Austria
15. Princess Maria Antonia of the Two Sicilies

Prince Ferdinand Pius, Duke of Castro House of Bourbon-Two Sicilies Cadet branch of the House of Bourbon Born: 25 July 1869 Died: 7 January 1960
Titles in pretence
Preceded by Prince Alfonso, Count of Caserta	— TITULAR — King of the Two Sicilies; 26 May 1934 – 7 January 1960; Reason for succession failure: Italian Unification under the House of Savoy	Succeeded by Disputed; Prince Ranieri, Duke of Castro or Infante Alfonso, Duke of Calabria
