= Prince Ranieri, Duke of Castro =

Prince Ranieri
- Duke of Castro
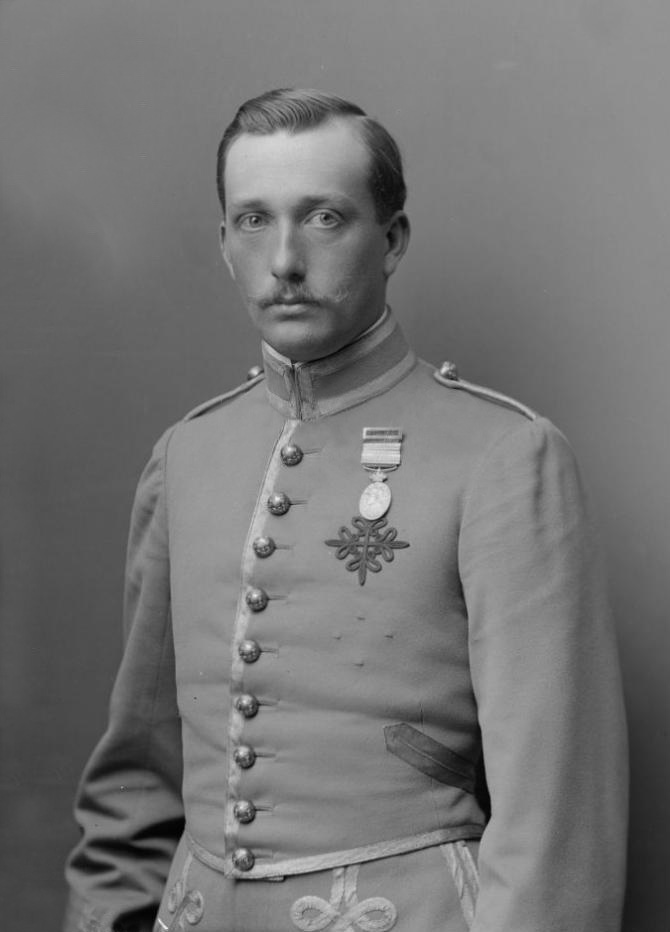
- Portrayed with a cavalry uniform of the Spanish Army and the Order of Alcántara, c. 1914

Head of the House of Bourbon-Two Sicilies (disputed)
- Tenure: 7 January 1960 – 13 January 1973
- Predecessor: Prince Ferdinand Pius
- Successor: Prince Ferdinand
- Born: 3 December 1883; Cannes, France
- Died: 13 January 1973 (aged 89); Roquebrune-sur-Argens, France
- Burial: Cimetière du Grand Jas, Cannes
- Spouse: Countess Maria Carolina Zamoyska (m. 1923; died 1968)
- Issue: Princess Maria del Carmen; Prince Ferdinand, Duke of Castro
Names
- Italian: Ranieri Maria Benito Giuseppe Labaro Gaetano Francesco Saverio Barbara Niccolo et omnes sancti di Borbone
- House: Bourbon-Two Sicilies
- Father: Prince Alfonso, Count of Caserta
- Mother: Princess Maria Antonietta of Bourbon-Two Sicilies
- Religion: Roman Catholic

Prince Ranieri Maria Gaetano, Duke of Castro (3 December 1883 – 13 January 1973) was a claimant to the headship of the House of Bourbon-Two Sicilies.

== Biography ==
He was born in Cannes, France, the ninth child but fifth son of Prince Alfonso, Count of Caserta and Princess Maria Antonietta of Bourbon-Two Sicilies (1851–1938). Ranieri for a time served in the Royal Spanish Army.

Following the death of his brother Prince Ferdinand Pius, Duke of Calabria on 7 January 1960 Prince Ranieri was declared Head of the House of Bourbon-Two Sicilies by all relatives except for Infante Alfonso, Duke of Calabria and his children, because the Infante's senior branch of the family abdicated their claims in order to be in line for the Spanish throne. He remained head of the house until his death on 13 January 1973 in Lacombe. He handed over the functions associated with the headship of the house to his son in 1966.

== Marriage and children ==
Ranieri married his first cousin Countess Maria Carolina Zamoyska (1896–1968) on 12 September 1923 in Vyšné Ružbachy, Slovakia, from the marriage he had two children:

- Princess Maria del Carmen Carolina Antonia of Bourbon-Two Sicilies (1924–2018).
- Prince Ferdinando Maria Andrea Alfonso Marcus, Duke of Castro (1926–2008).

== Honours ==
- Grand Master of the Sacred Military Constantinian Order of Saint George
- Grand Master of the Order of Saint Januarius
- Grand Master of the Order of Saint Ferdinand and of Merit
- Grand Master of the Royal Order of Francis I
- Grand Master of the Order of Saint George and Reunion
- Knight of the Spanish Order of the Golden Fleece
- Knight of the Order of Saint Hubert of Bavaria
- Knight of the Supreme Order of the Most Holy Annunciation
- Bailiff Grand Cross of Honor and Devotion of the Sovereign Military Order of Malta
- Knight Grand Cross of the Order of Charles III
- Knight of the Order of Alcántara

== Arms ==
Heraldry of Prince Ranieri

Prince Rainieri's arms
Until 1960

Prince Rainieri's arms
used in Spain

Prince Ranieri's arms as head of the Royal House
1960-1973

== Ancestry ==
Ancestors of Prince Ranieri, Duke of Castro

8. Francis I of the Two Sicilies
4. Ferdinand II of the Two Sicilies
9. Infanta Maria Isabella of Spain
2. Prince Alfonso, Count of Caserta
10. Archduke Charles, Duke of Teschen
5. Archduchess Maria Theresa of Austria
11. Princess Henrietta of Nassau-Weilburg
1. Prince Ranieri, Duke of Castro
12. Francis I of the Two Sicilies (= 8)
6. Prince Francis, Count of Trapani
13. Infanta Maria Isabella of Spain (= 9)
3. Princess Maria Antonietta of Bourbon-Two Sicilies
14. Leopold II, Grand Duke of Tuscany
7. Archduchess Maria Isabella of Austria
15. Princess Maria Antonia of the Two Sicilies

Prince Ranieri, Duke of Castro House of Bourbon-Two Sicilies Cadet branch of the House of Bourbon Born: 3 December 1883 Died: 13 January 1973
Italian nobility
| Preceded by First in line | Duke of Castro; 7 January 1960 – 13 January 1973 | Succeeded by Prince Ferdinand |
Titles in pretence
| Preceded by Ferdinand Pius | — TITULAR — King of the Two Sicilies; 7 January 1960 – 13 January 1973; Reason for succession failure: Italian Unification under the House of Savoy | Succeeded by Ferdinand |
