= Prince Ferdinand, Duke of Castro =

Claimant to the headship of the former Royal House of the Two Sicilies

Prince Ferdinand
- Duke of Castro

Head of the House of Bourbon-Two Sicilies (disputed)
- Tenure: 13 January 1973 – 20 March 2008
- Predecessor: Prince Ranieri
- Successor: Prince Carlo
- Born: 28 May 1926; Podzamcze, Poland
- Died: 20 March 2008 (aged 81); Draguignan, France
- Spouse: Chantal de Chevron-Villette (m. 1949; died 2005)
- Issue: Princess Beatrice; Princess Anne; Prince Carlo, Duke of Castro
Names
- Ferdinando Maria Andrea Alfonso Marcus di Borbone
- House: Bourbon-Two Sicilies
- Father: Prince Ranieri, Duke of Castro
- Mother: Countess Maria Carolina Zamoyska
- Religion: Roman Catholic

Prince Ferdinand of Bourbon-Two Sicilies, Duke of Castro (Ferdinando Maria Andrea Alfonso Marcus; 28 May 1926 – 20 March 2008) was a claimant to the headship of the former Royal House of the Two Sicilies.

== Biography ==
Ferdinand was born in Podzamcze, the son of Prince Ranieri, Duke of Castro, and his wife Countess Maria Carolina Zamoyska. His parents were first cousins, as his grandmothers were sisters. His paternal grandparents were also first cousins. He lived most of his life in France and was the first member of the Two Sicilian royal family to serve in the French Armed Forces.

Ferdinand succeeded as head of the House of the Bourbon-Two Sicilies on his father's death in 1973, having carried out the functions associated with the headship of the family since 1966. He was Sovereign of the Sacred Military Constantinian Order of Saint George and the Royal Order of Francis I. He was decorated with several dynastic and state orders.

Ferdinand died in France on 20 March 2008.

== Marriage and children ==
Ferdinand was married in Giez on 23 July 1949 to Chantal de Chevron-Villette (1925–2005), and they had three children:

- Princess Béatrice (born 16 June 1950 in Saint-Raphaël), who married Prince Charles Bonaparte on 19 December 1978 in Paris and has issue; divorced in 1989
  - Princess Caroline Bonaparte (born 24 October 1980) married Eric Alain Marie Quérénet-Onfroy de Bréville (born 28 June 1971) on 27 September 2009 in Castellabate nel Cilento, Italy; and has issue:
    - Elvire Quérénet-Onfroy de Bréville (born 8 August 2010).
    - Augustin Quérénet-Onfroy de Bréville (born 12 February 2013).
  - Prince Jean-Christophe Bonaparte, The Prince Napoléon (born 11 July 1986) married Countess Olympia von und zu Arco-Zinneberg on 17 October 2019. They had one son:
    - Prince Louis Napoléon (born 7 December 2022).
- Princess Anne (born 24 April 1957 in Saint-Raphaël) married Baron Jacques Cochin on 9 September 1977 in Roquebrunne-sur-Argens, and has issue; divorced
  - Nicolas Cochin (born in 1979)
  - Dorothée Cochin (born in 1985)
- Prince Carlo, Duke of Castro (born 24 February 1963 in Saint-Raphaël) married Camilla Crociani on 31 October 1998 in Monte Carlo
  - Princess Maria Carolina of Bourbon-Two Sicilies, The Duchess of Calabria (born 23 June 2003)
  - Princess Maria Chiara of Bourbon-Two Sicilies, The Duchess of Noto (born 1 January 2005)

As the marriage was initially considered morganatic, Ferdinand’s children were considered ineligible for the throne of Two-Scillies. Following his father's assumption as head of the house, however, he retroactively declared Ferdinand's marriage dynastic and his children eligible for the throne. This was contested by the Calabrian pretenders until 2014.

== Honours ==
- Sovereign Military Order of Malta: Bailiff Knight Grand Cross of Obedience of the Sovereign Military Order of Malta, 1st Class
- Panama: Grand Cross of the Order of Vasco Núñez de Balboa, Special Class

== Ancestry ==
Ancestors of Prince Ferdinand, Duke of Castro

8. Ferdinand II of the Two Sicilies
4. Prince Alfonso, Count of Caserta
9. Maria Theresa of Austria
2. Prince Ranieri, Duke of Castro
10. Prince Francis, Count of Trapani
5. Princess Maria Antonietta of Bourbon-Two Sicilies
11. Archduchess Maria Isabella of Austria
1. Prince Ferdinand, Duke of Castro
12. Count Stanisław Kostka Zamoyski
6. Count Andrzej Przemysław Zamoyski
13. Countess Róża Marianna Potocka
3. Countess Maria Carolina Zamoyska
14. Prince Francis, Count of Trapani (= 10)
7. Princess Maria Carolina of Bourbon-Two Sicilies
15. Archduchess Maria Isabella of Austria (= 11)

Prince Ferdinand, Duke of Castro House of Bourbon-Two Sicilies Cadet branch of the House of Bourbon Born: 28 May 1926 Died: 20 March 2008
Italian nobility
Preceded by Prince Ranieri	Duke of Castro; 13 January 1973 – 20 March 2008	Succeeded by Prince Carlo
Titles in pretence
Preceded by Ranieri	— TITULAR — King of the Two Sicilies; 13 January 1973 – 20 March 2008; Reason for succession failure: Italian Unification under the House of Savoy	Succeeded by Carlo
