= Royal Order of Francis I =

Awards of an order of chivalry of Italy

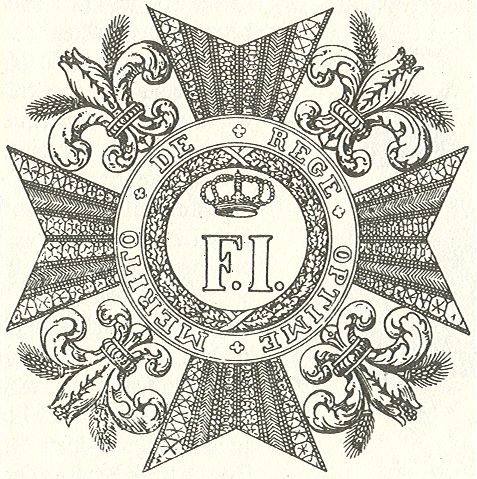
- Breast Star of the Order

Awarded by the House of Bourbon-Two Sicilies
- Type: Previously a State Order, Currently a Dynastic Order
- Established: 28 September 1829
- Motto: MERITO DE REGE OPTIME
- Awarded for: Civil and military merit and services to industry, agriculture, and the arts to the former Kingdom of the Two Sicilies

Precedence
- Next (higher): Order of Saint George of the Reunion
- Ribbon of the Order

The Royal Order of Francis I (properly 'The Royal Order of Francis I of the Two Sicilies' Italian: Reale Ordine di Francesco I) is an order of merit of the former Kingdom of the Two Sicilies which was annexed in 1861 by the King of Italy (until 1860 King of Piedmont and Sardinia). It has been revived by Prince Carlo, Duke of Castro, as an award for services to charity and inter-religious understanding and includes a number of non-Roman Catholic statesmen and stateswomen among its membership.

== History ==
The Royal Order of Francis I was established on 28 September 1829 as an award of civil merit in the Kingdom of the Two Sicilies for distinction in public service, science, the arts, agriculture, industry and commerce.

Although the order was a State Order and the Kingdom of the Two Sicilies ceased to exist in 1860, the Order continued to be awarded by the exiled King Francis II and his brother and successor Prince Alfonso, Count of Caserta, although the latter did so for the last time in 1920, since they were still claiming all the prerogatives of the crown. His successor as head of the Dynasty, Prince Carlo, Duke of Castro, much like his father, Prince Ferdinand, Duke of Castro, head of the line of the family descended from Prince Ranieri, Duke of Castro has claimed the title and right of Grand Master and bestowed the order.

== Notable recipients ==
Dames Grand Cross

- Princess Benedikte of Denmark
- Princess Elena of Romania (29 July 2012)
- Sinaitakala Fakafanua, Crown Princess of Tonga
- Lisa Niemi (July 2011)
- Princess Katarina of Yugoslavia
- Archduchess Maria Isabella of Austria
- Margaret Thatcher (14 November 2003)

Knights Grand Cross

- Gavyn Arthur
- Nadhmi Auchi
- Zaki Badawi
- Anthony Bailey (PR advisor)
- Abdul Qadir Bajamal
- Robert Balchin, Baron Lingfield (2014)
- Frederick Ballantyne
- Gaston Browne
- George Carey (2009)
- Prince Carlo, Duke of Castro
- Andrzej Ciechanowiecki
- Rachida Dati
- Mor Athanasius Toma Dawod, Archbishop of the Syriac Orthodox Church in UK
- Ermias Sahle Selassie
- Ferdinand II of the Two Sicilies
- Prince Ferdinand, Duke of Castro
- Giustino Fortunato (1777–1862)
- Giovanna of Italy
- Gregorios Theocharous
- Ameenah Gurib-Fakim
- Lodewijk van Heiden
- Atifete Jahjaga
- Marcellin Jobard
- Mahmoud Khayami
- Leka, Crown Prince of Albania (born 1982)
- Gilbert Monckton, 2nd Viscount Monckton of Brenchley
- Nicholas, Crown Prince of Montenegro
- Ali Abdullah Saleh
- Khalid bin Faisal Al Saud
- Sigmund Sternberg
- Tom Thabane
- Edward Thomason
- George Tupou V
- Tupoutoʻa ʻUlukalala
- Desmond Tutu
- Filip Vujanović
- Gerald Grosvenor, 6th Duke of Westminster (2006)
- Duke William of Württemberg
- Rodney Williams (governor-general) (November 2014)
- Rowan Williams (2004)

Dames Commander
Knights Commander

- John Alderdice, Baron Alderdice
- Daniel Brennan, Baron Brennan
- John Burland
- Robert Murel Clark Jr.
- Joseph MacNeal Crews
- Charles Denman, 5th Baron Denman
- Matthew D. Dupee
- David Durie
- Bandar bin Khalid Al Faisal
- Robert Todd Giffin
- Konstantin of Hohenlohe-Schillingsfürst
- Nasser Khalili
- Sione Ngongo Kioa
- Norman Lamont
- Mothetjoa Metsing
- Abu Bakr al-Qirbi
- Desmond de Silva (barrister)
- D. Brenton Simons
- Michael Smurfit
- Conrad Swan
- Emidio Taliani
- Washington Carroll Tevis
- Prof. Dr. Aristomenis Exadaktylos
- H.E.Georgios Olympios, Diplomat

Knights or Dames

- Richard L. Cosnotti

Unknown Classes

- Gaspare Spontini
- Vincenzo Tineo

== Grades ==
Knight	Commander	Knight Grand Cross

The Order is now divided into five grades (the modern revival has allowed the award to women):

- Knight Grand Cross, with cross suspended from sash/cordon and star
- Dame Grand Cross, with cross suspended from breast bow edged in gold and covered with fleurs-de-lis and star
- Knight Grand Officer, with cross suspended from neck ribbon and star
- Dame Grand Officer, with cross suspended from breast bow edged in gold and star
- Knight Commander, with cross suspended from neck ribbon
- Dame Commander, with cross suspended from breast bow edged in gold
- Knight Officer, with cross suspended from breast drape ribbon
- Dame Officer, with cross suspended from breast bow
- Knight First Class, with cross suspended from breast drape ribbon
- Dame First Class, with cross suspended from breast bow

== See also ==
- Order of Saint Januarius
- Order of Saint George and Reunion
- Order of Saint Ferdinand and of Merit
- Sacred Military Constantinian Order of Saint George
