= Prince Carlo, Duke of Castro =

Claimant to the headship of the former House of Bourbon-Two Sicilies

Prince Carlo
- Duke of Castro
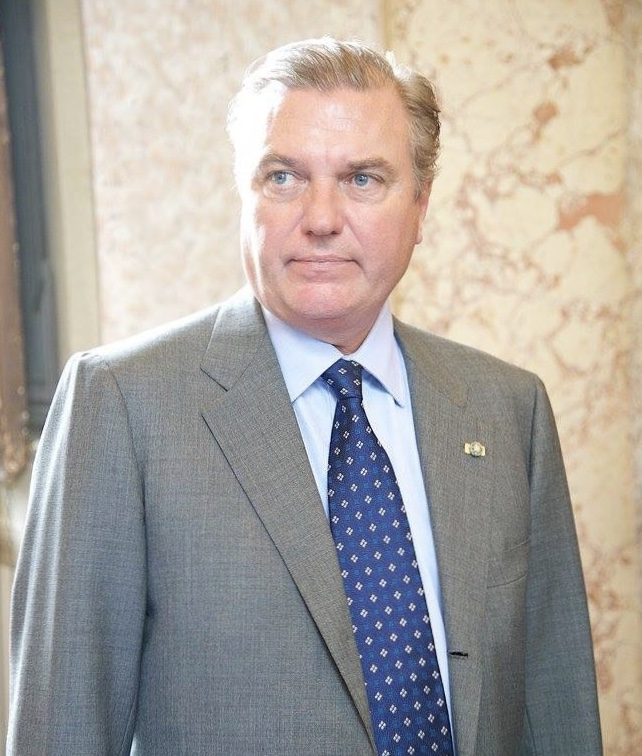
- Prince Carlo at the Pallavicini Palace, 2016

Head of the House of Bourbon-Two Sicilies (disputed)
- Tenure: 20 March 2008 – present
- Predecessor: Prince Ferdinand
- Heir apparent: Princess Maria Carolina
- Born: 24 February 1963 (age 63); Saint-Raphaël, Var, France
- Spouse: Camilla Crociani (m. 1998)
- Issue: Princess Maria Carolina, Duchess of Calabria and Palermo; Princess Maria Chiara, Duchess of Noto and Capri
Names
- Italian: Carlo Maria Bernardo Gennaro di Borbone-Due Sicilie
- House: Bourbon-Two Sicilies
- Father: Prince Ferdinand, Duke of Castro
- Mother: Chantal de Chevron-Villette

Prince Carlo of Bourbon-Two Sicilies, Duke of Castro (born 24 February 1963) is one of two claimants to the headship of the House of Bourbon-Two Sicilies.

== Early life ==
Prince Carlo was born in Saint-Raphaël, Var, France, the only son of Prince Ferdinand, Duke of Castro and Chantal de Chevron-Villette. He was educated at the Collège Stanislas and later studied at the Université Libérale de Paris.

== Marriage and issue ==
Prince Carlo married Camilla Crociani, daughter of Italian billionaire Camillo Crociani and his second wife, Italian actress Edy Vessel, on 31 October 1998 at the Cathedral of Our Lady Immaculate in the Monaco-Ville ward of Monaco. The couple were introduced to each other by Albert II, Prince of Monaco. Notable guests at the wedding included Rainier III, Prince of Monaco, Albert, Hereditary Prince of Monaco (later Prince Albert II of Monaco), and Prince Laurent of Belgium. Together Carlo and Camilla have two daughters:

- Princess Maria Carolina, Duchess of Calabria, Duchess of Palermo and heir apparent to the house of Bourbone-Due Sicilie (born 23 June 2003)
- Princess Maria Chiara, Duchess of Noto and Capri (born 1 January 2005)

Prince Carlo is also a godfather to Princess Josephine of Denmark, the youngest child of King Frederik X and Queen Mary of Denmark, and attended her confirmation in 2026. He and Princess Camilla are regarded as close friends of the Danish King and Queen.

== Claimed headship of the House of Bourbon-Two Sicilies ==
In 2008, Carlo succeeded to his father's claim as head of the House of the Two Sicilies and the use of the title Duke of Castro. This claim is disputed by the Spanish branch of the House of the Two Sicilies. As claimant to the headship of the house, he thus also claims to be sovereign of the Sacred Military Constantinian Order of Saint George as well as the Royal Order of Francis I.

The dispute between the Castroan and Spanish branches of the family began after the death of the last uncontested head of the house, Ferdinand Pius, in 1960. By male primogeniture, the immediate male heir of Ferdinand Pius was his nephew Infante Alfonso, the son of Pius's eldest younger brother Carlos. Carlos married María de las Mercedes, Princess of Asturias, the heir presumptive of Spain, in 1901. As a result of the marriage, his family forced Carlos to renounce his "eventual succession to the crown" of the Two Sicilies, in line with the centuries-old agreement that the crowns of Spain and the Two Sicilies were not to unify. Although this renunciation was interpreted by some as removing Carlos and his descendants from the line of succession of the Two Sicilies, supporters of Alfonso argued that the renunciation would only have applied if Carlos's wife or an eventual son had actually become the sovereign of Spain, which did not happen and would have most likely not happened at the time of the signing regardless. Nevertheless, Ferdinand Pius's and Carlos's younger brother, Ranieri, began to regard himself as Pius's heir. Upon Pius's death, both Ranieri and Alfonso claimed to be the legitimate heads of the family.

Alfonso's line of the family (today represented by Carlo's rival claimant, Pedro) has been officially recognized as the legitimate line by the Government of Spain, the Spanish royal house, the Parmesan royal house and the Portuguese royal house, whereas Ranieri's line was recognized by many non-ruling European dynasts of former monarchies (no current monarch except the king of Spain has officially stated its view on the matter), namely the Count of Paris, Umberto of Italy, Gottfried of Austria-Tuscany, the Duke of Bavaria, the Duke of Württemberg, the Duke of Aosta, the Duke of Genoa, the Duke of Hohenberg, Prince Luiz of Orléans-Braganza and Prince Michael of Greece, as well as all other members of the Sicilian house itself. It has been argued by some that the Counts of Paris supported the Castro line simply because their own pretence to the French throne depends entirely on the same principle of renunciation as the Act of Cannes, and so it would be against their own interest to support the Calabrian line. The Parises, however, sidelined a branch that renounced the claim of actually ascending a foreign throne and that reigns that throne until today (Bourbons of Spain). Interestingly, most of the other outspoken supporters of the Castro line were either sons-in-law of the Count of Paris or closely related to him.

== Honours ==
=== Dynastic ===
- (Kingdom of the Two Sicilies) House of Bourbon-Two Sicilies:
  - Sovereign Knight of the Order of Saint Januarius.
  - Sovereign Knight Grand Cross with Collar of Justice of the Two Sicilian Sacred Military Constantinian Order of Saint George.
  - Sovereign Knight Grand Cross of the Order of Saint Ferdinand and Merit.
  - Sovereign of the Royal Order of the Two-Sicilies.
  - Sovereign Knight Grand Cross of the Order of Saint George of the Reunion.
  - Sovereign Knight Grand Cross of the Royal Order of Francis I.
- (Kingdom of Montenegro) House of Petrović-Njegoš: Knight Grand Cross with Silver Star of the Order of Prince Danilo I.
- (Albanian Kingdom (1928–1939)) House of Zogu: Knight Grand Cross of the Order of Skanderbeg.
- (Kingdom of Italy) Italian Royal Family:
  - Knight of the Supreme Order of the Most Holy Annunciation.
  - Knight Grand Cross of the Order of Saints Maurice and Lazarus.
  - Knight Grand Cross of the Order of Merit of Savoy.
- (Kingdom of Portugal) Portuguese royal family: Knight Grand Cross of the Order of the Immaculate Conception of Vila Viçosa.

=== Ecclesiastical ===
- Melkite Greek Catholic Church: Knight Grand Cross of the Patriarchal Order of the Holy Cross of Jerusalem.

=== National ===
- Italy: Knight Grand Cross of the Order of Merit of the Italian Republic.
- Sovereign Military Order of Malta:
  - Bailiff Knight Grand Cross of Honour and Devotion of the Sovereign Military Order of Malta.
  - Knight Grand Cross of the Order pro Merito Melitensi.

=== Foreign ===
- Colombia: Knight Grand Cross of the Order of San Carlos.
- Costa Rica: Knight Grand Cross of the National Order of Juan Mora Fernandez.
- Dominica: Member of the Decoration of Honour.
- Lebanon: Extraordinary Class of the Lebanese Order of Merit.
- Panama: Grand Cross of the Order of Vasco Núñez de Balboa, Special Class.
- San Marino: Knight Grand Cross of the Equestrian Order of Saint Agatha.
- Syria: Grand Cross of the Order of Civil Merit.
- Tonga: Knight Grand Cross of the Order of The Most Devoted Royal Household Order of Tonga.

In letters dated 21 July 2017, the Governor-General of Antigua and Barbuda issued a notice that the Duke of Castro's 2014 appointment to the Order of the Nation had been annulled. The appointment of his wife was likewise annulled. In 2020, the branch of the Constantinian Order led by Prince Carlo was alleged to have influenced the election of Patricia Scotland as Commonwealth Secretary-General, which a spokesman for the Order denied, saying "These allegations are wholly offensive and wrong". It was alleged that Scotland used the Order's awards to influence votes in her favour, even though four of the five honoured national leaders had voted against her appointment.

=== Awards ===
- United Kingdom: Freedom of the City of London

Prince Carlo, Duke of Castro House of Bourbon-Two Sicilies Cadet branch of the House of Bourbon Born: 24 February 1963
Italian nobility
Preceded by Prince Ferdinand	Duke of Castro; 20 March 2008 – present	Incumbent; Heir: Princess Maria Carolina, Duchess of Calabria and Palermo
Titles in pretence
Preceded by Ferdinand III	— TITULAR — King of the Two Sicilies (Castro claimant); 2008 – present Reason for succession failure: Italian Unification under the House of Savoy	Incumbent; Heir: Princess Maria Carolina, Duchess of Calabria and Palermo
Preceded by Prince Pedro of Bourbon-Two Sicilies	Line of succession to the throne of the Two Sicilies (Calabria line); 5th position	Succeeded by Prince François of Bourbon-Two Sicilies
Preceded by Prince Pedro of Bourbon-Two Sicilies	Line of succession to the French throne (Legitimist) c. 22nd position	Succeeded by Prince François of Bourbon-Two Sicilies
