= Zaki Badawi =

Egyptian Islamic scholar

Sheikh Mohammed Aboulkhair Zaki Badawi KBE, GCFO (Arabic: الشيخ محمد أبو الخير زكي بدوي; 14 January 1922 – 24 January 2006) was a prominent Egyptian Islamic scholar, community activist, and promoter of interfaith-dialogue. He was the principal of the Muslim College in London, which he founded in 1986. He also was a frequent writer and broadcaster on Islamic affairs.

== Early life and education ==
Born in Egypt, Badawi trained at al-Azhar University in Cairo, gaining an undergraduate degree in Theology. He received the King Farouk First Prize for the best undergraduate student, and obtained subsequently a master's degree in Arabic Language and Literature in 1947 at the same university. He again received the King Farouk First Prize for the best postgraduate student. He moved to the United Kingdom in 1951 and studied Psychology at University College London, obtaining his B.Sc. degree in 1954 and a Ph.D. degree in Modern Muslim Thought from the University of London.

== Career and further life ==
After his education, Badawi returned to al-Azhar University to teach Muslim Thought and Scientific Research Methods. He established a Muslim College in Malaysia, and taught Arabic and Islamic Studies at the University of Malaya in Singapore and in Kuala Lumpur. In 1964 he became Professor of Islamic Education at Ahmadu Bello University, Northern Nigeria and Professor of Islamic Education and Dean of Arts at Bayero College, Nigeria. In 1976, Badawi went to London as a research professor for the Hajj Research Centre of the King Abdul Aziz University in Saudi Arabia.

In 1978, Badawi was appointed director of the Islamic Cultural Centre (ICC) and Chief Imam of the London Central Mosque in Regent's Park. In this period, He participated in establishing the Shariah Council as a facility to reconcile conflicts between Islamic law and the British civil code. Badawi was elected chairman of the Imams and Mosques Council by the National Conference of Imams and Mosque Officials of the UK in 1984.

In 1982, Badawi joined the board of the Islamic Banking System in Luxembourg. He participated in negotiations with the Bank of England to establish the first Islamic financial institution licensed in the United Kingdom, the Islamic Finance House (IFH). Badawi managed the IFH for three years, and published and lectured on Muslim law in relation to banking, finance and business ethics. He was also a guest professor in business ethics at Cranfield University Business School, where he lectured to MBA students.

In 1986, Badawi established the Muslim College in London and became its director. The college became a postgraduate school for the training of imams and Muslim teachers in the West. The curriculum includes the study of both Islam and Western society and emphasizes interfaith dialogue. Badawi co-edited Encounter Magazine with news on interfaith meetings, and edited the Islamic Quarterly for four years. He often contributed to daily newspapers, and he published and lectured on a wide range of issues, including various conflicts, Islam in Britain, female genital cutting, democracy, the rights of the fetus, and human rights.

Badawi also chaired The Arabic Forum, the Islamic Religious Council and the National Council for the Welfare of Muslim Prisoners, established in 2001. He was a co-founder of the Three Faiths Forum, vice chairman of the World Congress of Faiths and director/trustee of the Forum Against Islamophobia and Racism (FAIR).

Badawi was a well-known voice for religious moderation and tolerance, and was the first prominent Muslim to criticize imams in the UK who did not teach in English. According to Professor Shk. Ali Hamid, Badawi advocated that Salman Rushdie should simply be ignored, and not given any attention.

In July 2005, soon after the London bombings, on 7 July, Badawi was refused entry into the US, upon arrival, having already been issued a visa. The US Customs and Border Protection office said Badawi had been refused entry to the country based on information indicating that he was "inadmissible". He accepted an apology from the United States government for his denial of entry into the country, at a time when he was scheduled to speak at a conference in the US.

Badawi died in London on 24 January 2006.

== Honours ==
Badawi was made an honorary Knight Commander of the Order of the British Empire (KBE) in 2004. He also was appointed by The Duke of Castro as Knight Grand Cross of the Royal Order of Francis I (GCFO) in recognition of his interfaith work.
