= Princess Maria Carolina of the Two Sicilies =

Princess Maria Carolina of the Two Sicilies may refer to:

- Marie-Caroline of Bourbon-Two Sicilies, Duchess of Berry, daughter of Francis I of the Two Sicilies by his first wife Maria Clementina of Austria, wife of Charles d'Artois, Duke of Berry
- Princess Maria Carolina of the Two Sicilies (born 1820), daughter of Francis I of the Two Sicilies by his second wife María Isabella of Spain, wife of Infante Carlos, Count of Montemolin
- Princess Maria Carolina of the Two Sicilies (born 1822), daughter of Leopold, Prince of Salerno, wife of Henri d'Orléans, Duke of Aumale
- Princess Maria Carolina of the Two Sicilies (born 1856), daughter of Prince Francis, Count of Trapani, wife of Count Andrzej Zamoyski
- Princess Maria Carolina of Bourbon-Two Sicilies (born 2003), daughter of Prince Carlo, Duke of Castro, and Camilla Crociani
