= House of Bourbon-Two Sicilies =

Royal family of the Two Sicilies

- Parent house: Bourbon-Anjou
- Country: Kingdom of the Two Sicilies
- Founded: 1759; 267 years ago
- Founder: Ferdinand I of the Two Sicilies
- Current head: Disputed: Prince Pedro, Duke of Calabria; Prince Carlo, Duke of Castro
- Final ruler: Francis II
- Titles: King of Naples; King of Sicily; King of the Two Sicilies
- Deposition: 1861

The House of Bourbon-Two Sicilies is a cadet branch of the House of Bourbon that ruled Southern Italy and Sicily for more than a century in the 18th and 19th centuries. It descends from the Capetian dynasty in legitimate male line through Philip, Duke of Anjou (later Philip V of Spain), a younger grandson of Louis XIV of France (1638–1715) who established the Bourbon dynasty in Spain in 1700 as Philip V (1683–1746). In 1759, King Philip's younger grandson was appanaged with the kingdoms of Naples and Sicily, becoming Ferdinand IV and III (1751–1825), respectively, of those realms. His descendants occupied the joint throne, merged as the "Kingdom of the Two Sicilies" in 1816, until 1861, claimed it thereafter from exile, and constitute the extant Bourbon-Two Sicilies family.

The succession of the House of Bourbon-Two Sicilies has, since 1960, been disputed between the senior Calabrian line, which is currently represented by Prince Pedro, Duke of Calabria (born 1968), and the junior Castro line, which is currently represented by Prince Carlo, Duke of Castro (born 1963). Efforts of reconciliation were carried out in 2014, but have been followed by continuing arguing in the family as Prince Carlo, Duke of Castro, abolished the law of male primogeniture to absolute primogeniture in 2016, making his eldest daughter heir by going against the tradition of male-line succession within the House of Bourbon-Two Sicilies.

== Name ==
The name "Bourbon-Two Sicilies" (sometimes shortened to "Bourbon-Sicily") combines the patriline (Bourbon) with their former territorial designation (Two Sicilies).

== Kingdom of the Two Sicilies ==
The name of the Kingdom of the Two Sicilies came from the unification of the Kingdom of Sicily with the Kingdom of Naples (called the kingdom of peninsular Sicily), by King Alfonso V of Aragon in 1442. The two had been separated since the Sicilian Vespers of 1282. At the death of King Alfonso in 1458, the kingdoms became divided between his brother John II of Aragon, who kept Sicily, and his bastard son Ferdinand, who became King of Naples. The crowns of Naples and Sicily remained functionally separate, albeit often ruled by the same monarch, until their formal union in 1816.

The last reigning king, Francis II, was overthrown by Giuseppe Garibaldi in 1860; the following year, the Kingdom of the Two Sicilies was annexed by the newly founded Kingdom of Italy by plebiscite.

== Reigning kings ==
Name	Portrait	Birth	Marriage(s)	Death
Ferdinand I 1816–1825	Ferdinand I	12 January 1751; Naples son of Charles VII and Maria Amalia of Saxony	Marie Caroline of Austria; 12 May 1768; 17 children Lucia Migliaccio of Floridia; 27 November 1814; No children	4 January 1825; Naples aged 73
Francis I 1825–1830	Francis I	14 August 1777; Naples son of Ferdinand I and Maria Carolina of Austria	Maria Isabella of Spain; 6 July 1802; 12 children	8 November 1830; Naples aged 53
Ferdinand II; 1830–1859	Ferdinand II	12 January 1810; Palermo son of Francis I and Maria Isabella of Spain	Maria Christina of Savoy; 21 November 1832; 1 child Maria Theresa of Austria; 9 January 1837; 12 children	22 May 1859; Caserta aged 49
Francis II; 1859–1861	Francis II	16 January 1836; Naples son of Ferdinand II and Maria Christina of Savoy	Maria Sophie of Bavaria; 8 January 1859; 1 child	27 December 1894; Arco aged 58

== Heads of the House since 1861 ==
Name Reign	Portrait	Birth	Marriage(s) Issue	Death	Claim
Francis II; 17 March 1861 – 27 December 1894		16 January 1836; Naples, Two Sicilies Son of Ferdinand II of the Two Sicilies and Maria Cristina of Savoy	Maria Sophie of Bavaria; Bari Cathedral; 3 February 1859; 1 daughter	27 December 1894; Aged 58; Arco, Trentino, Austria-Hungary	Son of Ferdinand II; Deposed king of the Two Sicilies
Prince Alfonso, Count of Caserta (Alphonse I); 27 December 1894 – 26 May 1934		28 March 1841; Caserta, Two Sicilies Son of Ferdinand II of the Two Sicilies and Maria Theresa of Austria	Maria Antonietta of Bourbon-Two Sicilies; Church in Rome; 8 June 1868; 12 children	26 May 1934; Aged 93; Cannes, France	4th son of Ferdinand II; Half-brother of Francis II
Prince Ferdinand Pius, Duke of Calabria (Ferdinand III); 26 May 1934 – 7 January 1960		25 July 1869; Rome, Papal States Son of Prince Alfonso, Count of Caserta and Maria Antonietta of Bourbon-Two Sicilies	Maria of Bavaria; Munich Frauenkirche; 31 May 1897; 6 children	7 January 1960; Aged 90; Lindau, Bavaria, Germany	1st son of Alfonso, Count of Caserta

When Prince Ferdinand Pius died in 1960, he left no male descendant, and two branches of the family claimed the right to succeed him as head of the house. Ferdinand Pius had seven younger brothers. At the time of Ferdinand Pius's death in 1960, the oldest brother, Carlos (1870–1949) was deceased, but had left descendants. The next surviving brother was Ranieri (1883–1973). By the rule of primogeniture, headship would normally pass through Carlos to his son Alfonso. Ranieri contested Alfonso's claim arguing that Carlos had renounced any claim to the Two Sicilies succession on the part of himself and his heirs when he executed the Act of Cannes in 1900 in anticipation of his marriage the next year to Mercedes, Princess of Asturias, heiress presumptive to the Spanish throne. Alfonso offered a different interpretation of the Act of Cannes, describing it as effective only if Carlos should succeed to the Spanish throne. He also took the position that the Act of Cannes was invalid under the succession rules of the house of Two Sicilies itself, since these laws provided only one, specific reason for a renunciation and that was in the event of the Spanish and Two Sicilies crowns being united in one person - which has not happened since 1759. Despite an investigation by five of the highest institutions of the Spanish state having concluded unanimously that the legitimate claimant was the late Infante Carlos, Duke of Calabria, the junior line continues to perpetuate its claim.

Senior (Calabrian) line
Name Reign	Portrait	Birth	Marriage(s) Issue	Death	Claim
Infante Alfonso, Duke of Calabria (Alphonse II); 7 January 1960 – 3 February 1964		30 November 1901; Madrid, Spain Son of Carlos of Bourbon-Two Sicilies and Mercedes, Princess of Asturias	Alicia of Bourbon-Parma; St. Stephen's Cathedral, Vienna; 13 April 1936; 3 children	3 February 1964; Aged 62; Madrid, Spain	Grandson of Alfonso, Count of Caserta; Nephew of Ferdinand Pius, Duke of Calabria
Infante Carlos, Duke of Calabria (Charles I); 3 February 1964 – 5 October 2015		16 January 1938; Lausanne, Switzerland Son of Alfonso, Duke of Calabria and Alicia of Bourbon-Parma	Anne of Orléans; St's Peter Church, Dreux; 12 May 1965; 5 children	5 October 2015; Aged 77; Retuerta del Bullaque, Ciudad Real, Spain	1st son of Alfonso, Duke of Calabria
Prince Pedro, Duke of Calabria (Peter I); 5 October 2015 – present		16 October 1968; Madrid, Spain Son of Carlos, Duke of Calabria and Anne of Orléans	Sofía Landaluce y Melgarejo; Almudena Cathedral; 30 March 2001; 7 children		1st son of Carlos, Duke of Calabria

Junior (Castrian) line
Name Reign	Portrait	Birth	Marriage(s) Issue	Death	Claim
Prince Ranieri, Duke of Castro (Rainier I); 7 January 1960 – 13 January 1973		3 December 1883; Cannes, France Son of Prince Alfonso, Count of Caserta and Maria Antonietta of Bourbon-Two Sicilies	Maria Carolina Zamoyska; Church in Vyšné Ružbachy, now Slovakia; 12 September 1923; 2 children	13 January 1973; Aged 89; Lacombe, France	5th son of Alfonso, Count of Caserta; Brother of Ferdinand Pius, Duke of Calabria; Claim based on documents reputed invalid
Prince Ferdinand, Duke of Castro (Ferdinand IV); 13 January 1973 – 20 March 2008		28 May 1926; Maciejowice, Poland Son of Prince Ranieri, Duke of Castro and Maria Carolina Zamoyska	Chantal de Chevron-Villette; Church in Giez, Switzerland; 23 July 1949; 3 children	20 March 2008; Aged 81; Draguignan, France	Son of Ranieri, Duke of Castro
Prince Carlo, Duke of Castro (Charles I); 20 March 2008 – present		23 February 1963; Saint-Raphaël, France Son of Prince Ferdinand, Duke of Castro and Chantal de Chevron-Villette	Camilla Crociani; Saint-Charles Church, Monaco; 31 October 1998; 2 daughters		Son of Ferdinand, Duke of Castro

On 25 January 2014, representatives of the two rival branches, Prince Carlo (Castro line) and Prince Pedro, then Duke of Noto (Calabria line), jointly signed a pledge of partial reconciliation. The document recognised both branches as members of the same house, committed both to pursue further reconciliation and concord, meanwhile recognising the titles then claimed by each branch.

At the Holy Mass in Saint Peter's Basilica celebrated in Rome on 14 May 2016, during a Pilgrimage by members of the Constantinian Order awarded by Prince Carlo to Rome and Vatican City, Prince Carlo made public his decision to change the rules of succession. He claimed that this change was so the rules of succession would be (as he claimed) compatible with international and European law, prohibiting any discrimination between men and women. The rule of absolute primogeniture would henceforth apply to his direct descendants, his elder daughter being named by him as heiress apparent. Prince Pedro publicly objected that Prince Carlo's declaration violated the terms of their reconciliation agreement, to which Carlo replied that further "destabilisation" could lead to termination of the 2014 pact.

== Members of the House ==
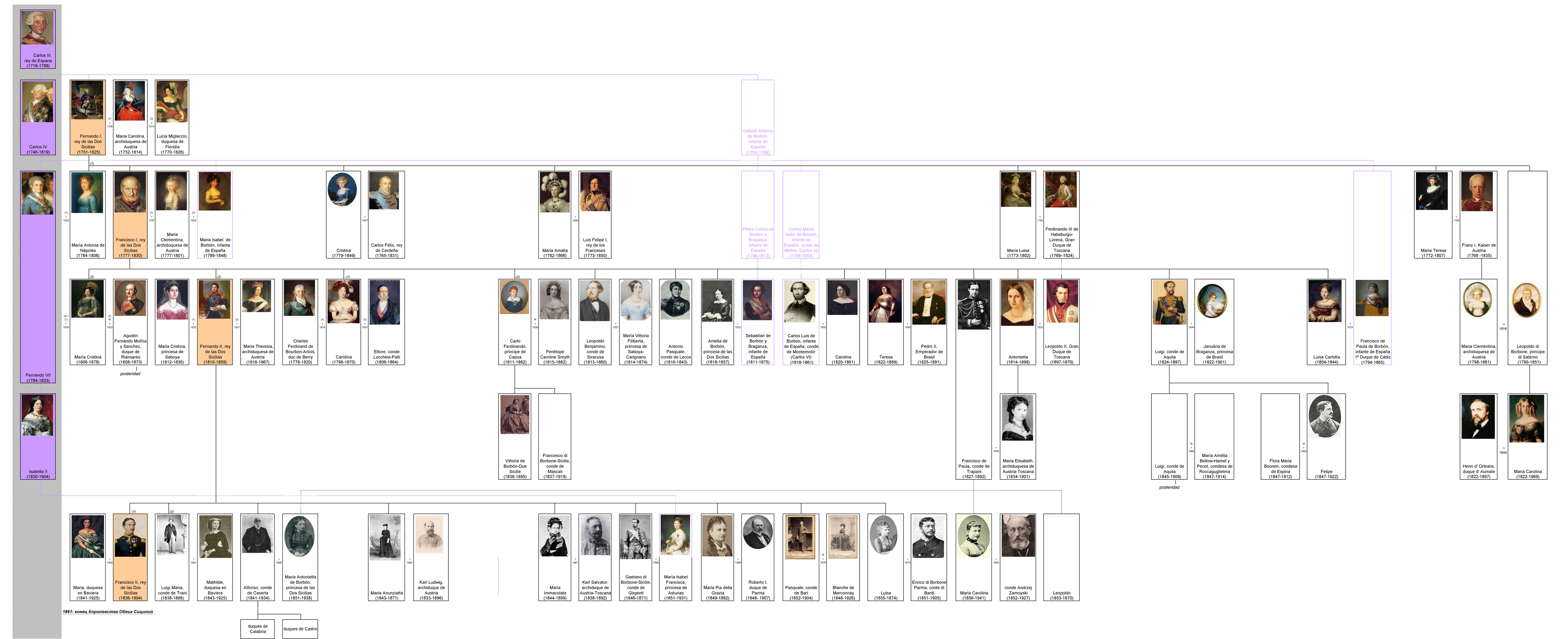
Family tree

=== Titles ===
Children and male-line grandchildren of the King of the Two Sicilies bore the title Prince(ss) Royal of the Two Sicilies with the style of Royal Highness. Other agnatic descendants of the King, born of authorized marriages, bore the title Prince(ss) of the Two Sicilies with the style of Royal Highness.

Since 1861, and similarly to members of the House of Bourbon-Parma, the style Prince(ss) of Bourbon-Two Sicilies has been used for and by members of this family to highlight their membership in the House of Bourbon. The title of princess is also borne by the wives of the princes of the house provided the marriage is dynastically approved.

=== Princes of the Two Sicilies (since 1816) ===
Name	Birth	Death	Notes
Francis I	14 August 1777	8 November 1830	Son of Ferdinand I. Title held from father's accession to own ascension in 1825.
Leopold, Prince of Salerno	2 July 1790	10 March 1851	Son of Ferdinand I. Title held from father's accession to death.
Ferdinand II	12 January 1810	22 May 1859	Son of Francis I. Title held from grandfather's accession to own ascension in 1830.
Charles Ferdinand, Prince of Capua	10 November 1811	22 April 1862	Son of Francis I. Title held from grandfather's accession to death.
Leopold, Count of Syracuse	22 May 1813	4 December 1860	Son of Francis I. Title held from grandfather's accession to death.
Anthony, Count of Lecce	23 September 1816	12 January 1843	Son of Francis I. Title held from grandfather's accession to death.
Louis, Count of Aquila	19 July 1824	5 March 1897	Son of Francis I. Title held from birth to death.
Prince Louis	19 July 1824	7 August 1824	Son of Leopold, Prince of Salerno. Title held from birth to death.
Francis, Count of Trapani	13 August 1827	24 September 1892	Son of Francis I. Title held from birth to death.
Francis II	16 January 1836	27 December 1894	Son of Ferdinand II. Title held from birth to own ascension in 1859.
Louis, Count of Trani	1 August 1838	8 June 1886	Son of Ferdinand II. Title held from birth to death.
Albert, Count of Castrogiovanni	17 September 1839	12 July 1844	Son of Ferdinand II. Title held from birth to death.
Alfonso, Count of Caserta	28 March 1841	26 May 1934	Son of Ferdinand II. Title held from birth to death.
Louis, Count of Roccaguglielma	18 July 1845	27 November 1909	Son of Louis, Count of Aquila. Title held from birth to death.
Gaetan, Count of Girgenti	12 January 1846	26 November 1871	Son of Ferdinand II. Title held from birth to death.
Prince Philip	12 August 1847	9 July 1922	Son of Louis, Count of Aquila. Title held from birth to death.
Joseph, Count of Lucera	4 March 1848	28 September 1851	Son of Ferdinand II. Title held from birth to death.
Prince Maria Emmanuel	24 January 1851	26 January 1851	Son of Louis, Count of Aquila. Title held from birth to death.
Vincent, Count of Melazzo	26 April 1851	13 October 1854	Son of Ferdinand II. Title held from birth to death.
Pasquale, Count of Bari	15 September 1852	21 December 1904	Son of Ferdinand II. Title held from birth to death.
Prince Leopold	24 September 1853	4 September 1870	Son of Francis, Count of Trapani. Title held from birth to death.
Januarius, Count of Caltagirone	28 February 1857	13 August 1867	Son of Ferdinand II. Title held from birth to death.
Prince Ferdinand	25 May 1857	22 July 1859	Son of Francis, Count of Trapani. Title held from birth to death.
Ferdinand Pius, Duke of Calabria	25 July 1869	17 January 1960	Son of Alfonso, Count of Caserta. Title held from birth to death.
Prince Carlos	10 November 1870	11 November 1949	Son of Alfonso, Count of Caserta. Title held from birth to death.
Prince Francisco Armando Federico De La Cruz De Bourbon	14 July 1873	26 June 1945	Son of Alfonso, Count of Caserta. Title held from 1960, birth to death.
Prince Gennaro	24 January 1882	11 April 1944	Son of Alfonso, Count of Caserta. Title held from birth to death.
Ranieri, Duke of Castro	3 December 1883	13 January 1973	Son of Alfonso, Count of Caserta. Title held from 1960 to death.
Prince Philip	10 December 1885	9 March 1949	Son of Alfonso, Count of Caserta. Title held from birth to death.
Prince Francis of Assisi	13 January 1888	26 March 1914	Son of Alfonso, Count of Caserta. Title held from birth to death.
Prince Gabriel	1 January 1897	22 October 1975	Son of Alfonso, Count of Caserta. Title held from birth to death.
Ruggiero, Duke of Noto	7 September 1901	1 December 1914	Son of Ferdinand Pius, Duke of Calabria. Title held from birth to death.
Alfonso, Duke of Calabria.	30 November 1901	3 February 1964	Son of Prince Carlos. Title held from 1960 to death.
Prince Ferdinand	6 March 1903	4 August 1905	Son of Prince Carlos. Title held from birth to death.
Prince Carlo	5 September 1908	27 September 1936	Son of Prince Carlos. Title held from birth to death.
Prince Gaetano	16 April 1917	27 December 1984	Son of Prince Philip. Title held from birth to death.
Ferdinand, Duke of Castro	28 May 1926	20 March 2008	Son of Ranieri, Duke of Castro. Title held from 1973 to death.
Prince Antoine	20 January 1929	11 November 2019	Son of Prince Gabriel. Title held from birth.
Prince Jean	30 June 1933	25 December 2000	Son of Prince Gabriel. Title held from birth to death.
Prince Casimir	8 November 1938		Son of Prince Gabriel. Title held from birth.
Carlos, Duke of Calabria, Count of Caserta.	16 January 1938	5 October 2015	Son of Alfonso, Duke of Calabria. Title Duke of Noto held from 1960 to 1964 Duke of Calabria, Count of Caserta from 1964 to death.
Prince François	20 June 1960		Son of Prince Antoine. Title held from birth.
Carlo, Duke of Castro	24 February 1963		Son of Ferdinand, Duke of Castro. Title held from 2008.
Prince Gennaro	27 January 1966		Son of Prince Antoine. Title held from birth.
Prince Pedro, Duke of Castro, Duke of Noto, Duke of Calabria, Count of Caserta	16 October 1968		Son of Carlos, Duke of Calabria. Title of Duke of Noto from birth to 2015, others from 2015.
Prince Luís	28 November 1970		Son of Prince Casimir. Title held from birth.
Prince Alexander	9 August 1974		Son of Prince Casimir. Title held from birth.
Prince Jaime, Duke of Noto	26 June 1993		Son of Pedro, Duke of Calabria. Duke of Capua and Duke of Noto since 2015.
Prince Antoine	6 June 2003		Son of Prince François. Title held from birth.

=== Princesses of the Two Sicilies (since 1816) ===
==== By birth ====
Name	Birth	Death	Notes
Princess Luisa Carlotta	24 October 1804	29 January 1844	Daughter of Francis I. Title held from grandfather's ascension to death.
Princess Maria Christina	27 April 1806	22 August 1878	Daughter of Francis I. Title held from grandfather's ascension to death.
Princess Maria Antonia	19 December 1814	7 November 1898	Daughter of Francis I. Title held from grandfather's ascension to death.
Princess Maria Amalia	25 February 1818	6 November 1857	Daughter of Francis I. Title held from grandfather's ascension to death.
Princess Maria Carolina	29 November 1820	14 January 1861	Daughter of Francis I. Title held from birth to death.
Princess Theresa Christina	14 March 1822	28 December 1889	Daughter of Francis I. Title held from birth to death.
Princess Maria Carolina Augusta	26 April 1822	6 December 1869	Daughter of Leopold, Prince of Salerno. Title held from birth to death.
Princess Isabella	23 March 1838	24 March 1838	Daughter of Leopold, Count of Syracuse. Title held from birth to death.
Princess Maria Annunciata	24 March 1843	4 May 1871	Daughter of Ferdinand II. Title held from birth to death.
Princess Maria Immaculata	14 April 1844	18 February 1899	Daughter of Ferdinand II. Title held from birth to death.
Princess Maria Isabella	22 July 1846	14 February 1859	Daughter of Louis, Count of Aquila. Title held from birth to death.
Princess Maria Pia	2 August 1849	29 September 1882	Daughter of Ferdinand II. Title held from birth to death.
Princess Maria Antonietta	16 March 1851	12 September 1938	Daughter of Francis, Count of Trapani. Title held from birth to death.
Princess Maria Teresa Pia	7 January 1855	1 September 1856	Daughter of Francis, Count of Trapani. Title held from birth to death.
Princess Maria Luisa Immaculata	21 January 1855	23 February 1874	Daughter of Ferdinand II. Title held from birth to death.
Princess Maria Carolina	21 February 1856	7 April 1941	Daughter of Francis, Count of Trapani. Title held from birth to death.
Princess Maria Annunziata	21 September 1858	20 March 1873	Daughter of Francis, Count of Trapani. Title held from birth to death.
Princess Maria Teresa	15 January 1867	1 March 1909	Daughter of Louis, Count of Trani. Title held from birth to death.
Princess Maria Cristina Pia	24 December 1869	28 March 1870	Daughter of Francis II. Title held from birth to death.
Princess Maria Immaculata	30 October 1874	28 November 1947	Daughter of Alfonso, Count of Caserta. Title held from birth to death.
Princess Maria Cristina	10 April 1877	4 October 1947	Daughter of Alfonso, Count of Caserta. Title held from birth to death.
Princess Maria di Grazia	12 August 1878	20 June 1973	Daughter of Alfonso, Count of Caserta. Title held from birth to death.
Princess Maria Giuseppina	25 February 1880	22 July 1971	Daughter of Alfonso, Count of Caserta. Title held from birth to death.
Princess Maria Antonietta	16 April 1898	11 January 1957	Daughter of Ferdinand Pius, Duke of Calabria. Title held from birth to death.
Princess Maria Cristina	4 May 1899	21 April 1985	Daughter of Ferdinand Pius, Duke of Calabria. Title held from birth to death.
Princess Barbara	14 December 1902	1 January 1927	Daughter of Ferdinand Pius, Duke of Calabria. Title held from birth to death.
Princess Isabel Alfonsa	10 October 1904	18 July 1985	Daughter of Prince Carlos. Title held from birth to death.
Princess Lucia	9 July 1908	3 November 2001	Daughter of Ferdinand Pius, Duke of Calabria. Title held from birth to death.
Princess Maria de los Dolores	15 November 1909	11 May 1996	Daughter of Prince Carlos. Title held from birth to death.
Princess Maria de las Mercedes	23 December 1910	2 January 2000	Daughter of Prince Carlos. Title held from birth to death. Married Infante Juan, Count of Barcelona in 1935; mother of King Juan Carlos I of Spain.
Princess Urraca	14 July 1913	3 May 1999	Daughter of Ferdinand Pius, Duke of Calabria. Title held from birth to death.
Princess Maria de la Esperanza	14 June 1914	8 August 2005	Daughter of Prince Carlos. Title held from birth to death.
Princess Maria del Carmen	13 July 1924	22 November 2018	Daughter of Ranieri, Duke of Castro. Title held from birth.
Princess Maria Margarita	16 November 1934	15 January 2014	Daughter of Prince Gabriel. Title held from birth.
Princess Teresa, Duchess of Salerno	6 February 1937		Daughter of Alfonso, Duke of Calabria. Title held from birth.
Princess Maria Immaculata	25 June 1937	14 May 2020	Daughter of Prince Gabriel. Title held from birth.
Princess Inés María	18 February 1940		Daughter of Alfonso, Duke of Calabria. Title held from birth.
Princess Béatrice	16 June 1950		Daughter of Ferdinand, Duke of Castro. Title held from birth.
Princess Anne	24 April 1957		Daughter of Ferdinand, Duke of Castro. Title held from birth.
Princess Maria Carolina	18 July 1962		Daughter of Prince Antoine. Title held from birth.
Princess Cristina	15 March 1966		Daughter of Carlos, Duke of Calabria. Title held from birth.
Princess María	5 April 1967		Daughter of Carlos, Duke of Calabria. Title held from birth.
Princess Inés	20 April 1971		Daughter of Carlos, Duke of Calabria. Title held from birth.
Princess Anna Cecilia	24 December 1971		Daughter of Prince Casimir. Title held from birth.
Princess Maria Annunziata	4 March 1973		Daughter of Prince Antoine. Title held from birth.
Princess Elena Sofia	10 September 1973		Daughter of Prince Casimir. Title held from birth.
Princess Victoria	24 May 1976		Daughter of Carlos, Duke of Calabria. Title held from birth.
Princess Anna Sophia	9 April 1999		Daughter of Prince Luís. Title held from birth.
Princess Maria-Carolina, Duchess of Calabria	23 June 2003		Daughter and Heir apparent of Carlo, Duke of Castro. Title held from birth.
Princess Maria Chiara	1 January 2005		Daughter of Carlo, Duke of Castro. Title held from birth.
Princess Dorothée	10 May 2005		Daughter of Prince François. Title held from birth.

==== By marriage ====
Princess	Date of birth	Date of death	Husband	Notes
Queen Maria Isabella	6 July 1789	13 September 1848	King Francis I	Title held from her father-in-law's ascension to her husband's ascension in 1825
Archduchess Clementina, Princess of Salerno	1 March 1798	3 September 1881	Leopold, Prince of Salerno	Title held from her father-in-law's ascension to her death
Princess Maria, Countess of Syracuse	29 September 1814	2 January 1874	Prince Leopold, Count of Syracuse	Title held from her marriage in 1837 to her death
Princess Januária, Countess of Aquila	11 March 1822	13 March 1901	Prince Louis, Count of Aquila	Title held from her marriage in 1844 to her death
Archduchess Maria Isabella, Countess of Trapani	21 May 1834	14 July 1901	Prince Francis, Count of Trapani	Title held from her marriage in 1850 to her death
Queen Maria Sophie	4 October 1841	19 January 1925	King Francis II	Title held from her marriage in 1859 to her husband's ascension three months later
Princess Mathilde Ludovika, Countess of Trani	30 September 1843	18 June 1925	Prince Louis, Count of Trani	Title held from her marriage in 1861 to her death
Infanta Isabella, Countess of Girgenti	20 December 1851	23 April 1931	Prince Gaetan, Count of Girgenti	Title held from her marriage in 1868 to her death
Princess Maria Antonietta, Countess of Caserta*	16 March 1851	12 September 1938	Prince Alfonso, Count of Caserta	Title held from birth and also from her marriage in 1868 to her death
Princess Maria Ludwiga, Duchess of Calabria	6 July 1872	10 June 1954	Prince Ferdinand Pius, Duke of Calabria	Title held from her marriage in 1897 to her death
Mercedes, Princess of Asturias	11 September 1880	17 October 1904	Prince Carlos	Title held from her marriage in 1901 to her death
Princess Louise	24 February 1882	18 April 1958	Prince Carlos	Title held from her marriage in 1907 to her death
Princess Marie Louise	31 December 1896	8 March 1973	Prince Philip	Title held from her marriage in 1916 to her divorce in 1925
Princess Beatriz, Countess of Villa Colli	29 December 1881	20 August 1963	Prince Gennaro	Title held from her marriage in 1922 to her death
Princess Maria Carolina, Duchess of Castro	22 September 1896	9 May 1968	Prince Ranieri, Duke of Castro	Title held from her marriage in 1923 to her death
Princess Odete	22 November 1902	19 June 1968	Prince Philip	Title held from her marriage in 1927 to her death
Princess Malgorzata Izabella	17 August 1902	8 March 1929	Prince Gabriel	Title held from her marriage in 1927 to her death
Princess Cecylia	28 June 1907	20 September 2001	Prince Gabriel	Title held from her marriage in 1932 to her death
Infanta Alicia, Duchess of Calabria	13 November 1917	28 March 2017	Infante Alfonso, Duke of Calabria	Title held from her marriage in 1936 to her death
Princess Chantal, Duchess of Castro	10 January 1925	24 May 2005	Prince Ferdinand, Duke of Castro	Title held from her marriage in 1949 to her death
Princess Elisabeth	2 February 1933	29 January 2022	Prince Antoine	Title held from her marriage in 1958
Infanta Anne, Duchess of Calabria	4 December 1938		Infante Carlos, Duke of Calabria	Title held from her marriage in 1965
Princess Maria Cristina	12 September 1933	18 November 2023	Prince Casimir	Title held from her marriage in 1967
Princess Christine	20 May 1969		Prince Luís	Title held from her marriage in 1998 to her divorce in 2007
Princess Camilla, Duchess of Castro	5 April 1971		Prince Carlo, Duke of Castro	Title held from her marriage in 1998
Princess Alexandra	2 June 1967		Prince François	Title held from her marriage in 2000
Princess Sofia, Duchess of Calabria	23 November 1973		Prince Pedro, Duke of Calabria	Title held from her marriage in 2001
Princess Maria da Glória	19 May 1970		Prince Luís	Title held from her marriage in 2010
Princess Charlotte, Duchess of Noto	12 May 1993		Prince Jaime, Duke of Noto	Title held from her marriage in 2021

== See also ==
- List of monarchs of the Kingdom of the Two Sicilies
- List of royal consorts of the Kingdom of the Two Sicilies
- Descendants of Louis XIV
