= Princess Maria Chiara of Bourbon-Two Sicilies =

Italian socialite

Princess Maria Chiara
- Duchess of Noto and Capri
- Born: 1 January 2005 (age 21); Rome, Italy
Names
- Italian: Maria Chiara Carola Luisa Carmen di Borbone delle Due Sicilie
- House: Bourbon-Two Sicilies
- Father: Prince Carlo, Duke of Castro
- Mother: Camilla Crociani
- Occupation: socialite, social media influencer

TikTok information
- Page: chiaradebourbon
- Followers: 66.5K
- Last updated: 16 June 2025

Princess Maria Chiara of Bourbon-Two Sicilies, Duchess of Noto and Capri (Italian: Maria Chiara di Borbone delle Due Sicilie; born 1 January 2005) is an Italian socialite and social media influencer. She serves as an ambassador for the World Wide Fund for Nature.

== Early life, family, and education ==
Maria Chiara was born in Rome on 1 January, 2005 to Prince Carlo, Duke of Castro and Camilla Crociani. She is the younger sister of Princess Maria Carolina. She grew up between Paris, Monte Carlo, and Rome. Her godparents are Princess Michael of Kent, Princess Victoria zu Windisch-Graetz, Prince Augusto Ruffo di Calabria, and Sergio Mantegazza.

She graduated from Istituto Marangoni and continued her studies at Harvard University.

== Adult life and charity work ==
Maria Chiara is a patroness of the Monaco-based charity Rokethon, which raises money for abandoned dogs, and an ambassador of the ocean conservation nonprofit organization Passion Sea Project. She worked with the Society for the Prevention of Cruelty to Animals and supported animal welfare causes through animal adoption, awareness campaigns, and volunteer efforts. She was appointed as the ambassador for the Worldwide Fund for Nature in France and Italy.

She is a social media influencer, with large followings on Instagram and TikTok. She co-launched the YouTube channel Carolina & Chiara with her sister, which they started during the COVID-19 pandemic.

In 2023, she attended the Monaco Grand Prix with Christian, Crown Prince of Denmark.

In October 2024, she attended the opening of Christie's Asia Pacific Headquarters in Hong Kong with her family.

== Honours ==
=== Dynastic ===
- (Kingdom of the Two Sicilies) House of Bourbon-Two Sicilies:
  - 2018: Dame Grand Cross of Justice of the Sacred Military Constantinian Order of Saint George.
  - 1 January 2023: Dame of the Illustrious Royal Order of Saint Januarius.

=== National ===
- Italy:
  - 2018: Gold Medal of the Italian Red Cross.

=== Foreign ===
- Monaco:
  - 2018: Medal of the Red Cross of Monaco.

== Notable published works ==
- Il giardino dei piccoli eroi (2026).
