= Princess Maria Carolina of Bourbon-Two Sicilies (born 2003) =

Italian socialite (born 2003)

Princess Maria Carolina
- Duchess of Calabria and Palermo
- Born: 23 June 2003 (age 23); Rome, Italy
Names
- Italian: Maria Carolina Chantal Eduarda Beatrice Gennara di Borbone delle Due Sicilie
- House: Bourbon-Two Sicilies
- Father: Prince Carlo, Duke of Castro
- Mother: Camilla Crociani
- Occupation: Socialite, model, social media influencer

Princess Maria Carolina of Bourbon-Two Sicilies, Duchess of Calabria and Palermo (Italian: Maria Carolina di Borbone delle Due Sicilie; born 23 June 2003) is an Italian socialite, model, and social media influencer. She is the eldest daughter and heiress of Prince Carlo, Duke of Castro, the disputed head of the House of Bourbon-Two Sicilies.

== Early life and education ==
Maria Carolina was born in Rome on 23 June 2003 to Camilla Crociani, an Italian socialite and heiress, and Prince Carlo of Bourbon-Two Sicilies, Duke of Castro, the disputed head of the House of Bourbon-Two Sicilies. Her maternal grandmother is the actress Edy Vessel. Her paternal grandfather was Prince Ferdinand, Duke of Castro. She is the older sister of Princess Maria Chiara. Her paternal aunt is Princess Béatrice of Bourbon-Two Sicilies. She is a first cousin of Jean-Christophe, Prince Napoléon. Maria Carolina was baptized in the Palatine Chapel of the Royal Palace of Caserta. Her godfather is Prince Laurent of Belgium, younger brother of King Philippe of Belgium.

Maria Carolina grew up between Paris, Monte Carlo, and Rome. She was homeschooled, following the International Cambridge Educational System and regulations set in place by the National Centre for Distance Education, supervised by the Department of Education of Monaco. She went on to study at the International University of Monaco and the Istituto Marangoni. She has also taken online courses by Harvard University.

== Career, public life, and charitable work ==
Maria Carolina is an ambassador for the Passion Sea Project, a nonprofit organization that focuses on ocean conservation. She is also involved in charitable work with the International Red Cross and the World Wide Fund for Nature.

In 2014, she made a cameo appearance in biographical drama film Grace of Monaco. She modeled for Chopard, Louis Vuitton, and Pucci. Maria Carolina is a patroness of Rokethon, a Monaco-based charity for abandoned dogs.

In 2016, following her father's abolishment of Salic law, she became the heiress apparent to the headship of the House of Bourbon-Two Sicilies.

In 2019, she was presented to society at le Bal des débutantes in Paris. She was dressed by Ralph & Russo for the event, and escorted by Prince Léopold of Nassau, son of Prince Guillaume of Luxembourg.

Maria Carolina is a social media influencer, with large followings on Instagram, YouTube, and TikTok.

In October 2024, she attended the opening of Christie's Asia Pacific Headquarters in Hong Kong.

== Personal life ==
Maria Carolina is fluent in six languages: Italian, French, Spanish, Portuguese, English, and Russian.

In July 2024, she hosted a lavish 21st birthday party at the Cervo Hotel at Costa Smeralda in Sardinia, Italy.

In May 2025, Princess Maria Carolina was involved in a near-fatal motorcycle crash in Monaco. She was saved by the helmet she was wearing and was later treated at Princess Grace Hospital Centre.

Since spring 2026, she has been in a relationship with Jordan Bardella, president of the French far-right political party National Rally.

== Honours ==
=== Dynastic ===
- (Kingdom of the Two Sicilies) House of Bourbon-Two Sicilies:
  - 2018: Dame Grand Cross of Justice of the Sacred Military Constantinian Order of Saint George.
  - 23 June 2021: Dame of the Illustrious Royal Order of Saint Januarius.

=== National ===
- Italy:
  - 2018: Gold Medal of the Italian Red Cross.

=== Foreign ===
- Monaco:
  - 2018: Red Cross of Monaco.
