= Agostino Borromeo =

Italian historian (1944–2024)

His Excellency Count Agostino Borromeo
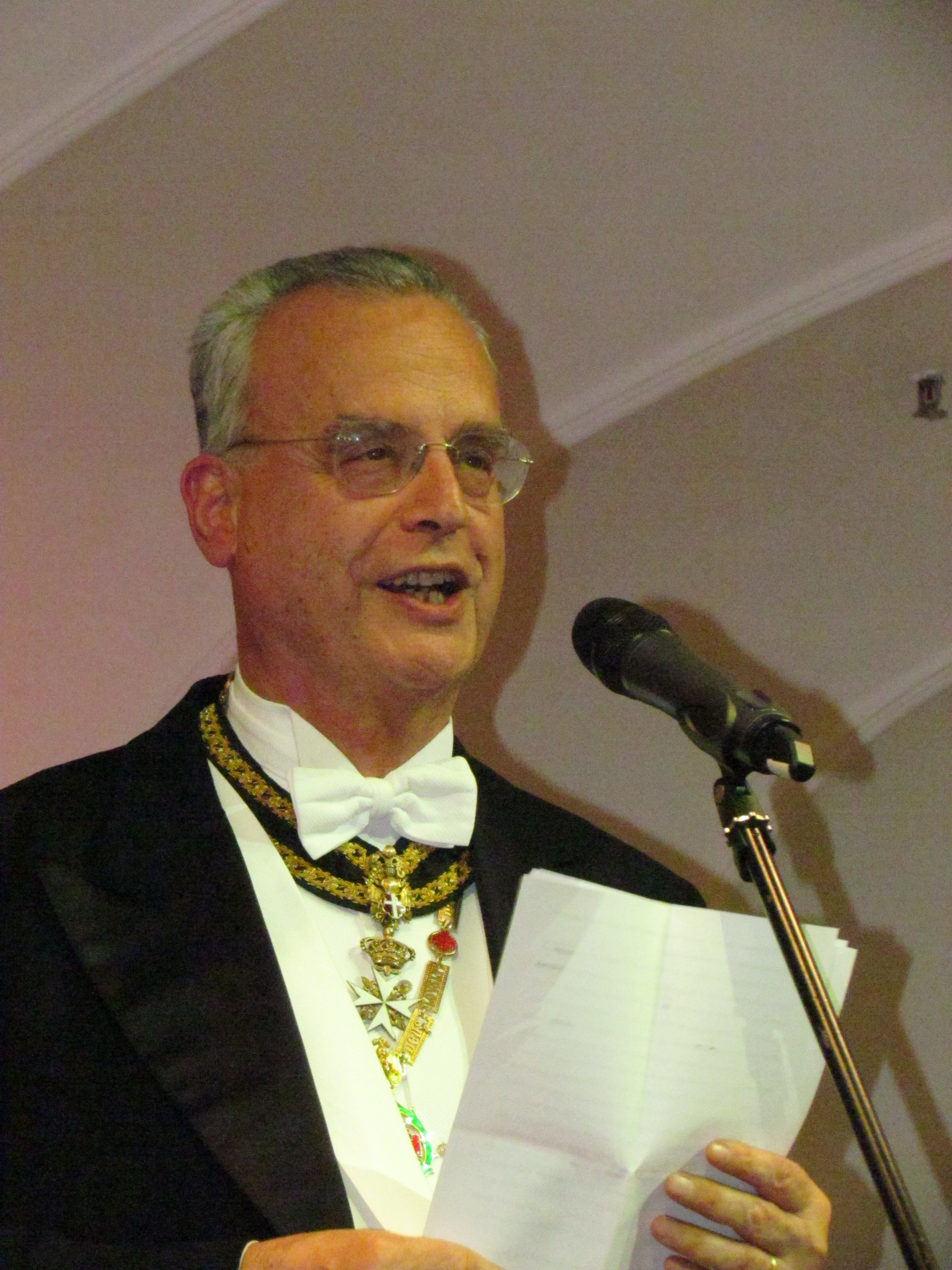
- Born: 24 January 1944; Oreno, Milan, Italy
- Died: 4 February 2024 (aged 80); Rome, Italy
- Education: Sapienza University of Rome
- Occupation: Lieutenant General of the Order of the Holy Sepulcher
- Title: Professor of history
- Spouse: Beatriz González de la Bastida Vergas
- Children: 3

Agostino Borromeo (24 January 1944 – 4 February 2024) was an Italian historian and academic who was Lieutenant General of Honor of the Order of the Holy Sepulchre.

== Early life and background ==
Count don Agostino Borromeo came forth from the aristocratic House of Borromeo family. He studied political science at the Sapienza University of Rome. He also completed his musical studies in piano, organ, and organ composition.

Borromeo married Beatriz González de la Bastida Vergas, and they had three children. He liked playing tennis, skiing, and photography.

== Career ==
Agostino Borromeo was an author of over 180 publications on the religious history of Southern Europe, musicology, and music criticism.

Borromeo was an internationally acclaimed expert on the history of the Inquisition. In October 1998, following the opening of the archive of the Congregation for the Doctrine of the Faith he coordinated the organization of an international symposium on the history of the Inquisition held at the Vatican. He was a Catholic commentator for the PBS television series Secret Files of the Inquisition.

Borromeo was also well known in the history of international relations in modern times and religious history of Spain.

Borromeo taught Modern and Contemporary History of the Catholic Church and other Christian confessions at his alma mater, Sapienza University of Rome, and gave annual courses on the History of Christianity and of the Churches at the prestigious private university Libera Università Maria SS. Assunta, Rome.

From 1992, he was president of the Italian Institute of Iberian Studies.

From 2006, he was President of the "Don Giuseppe de Luca" Association, an institution for the research in the field of religious history.

== Roman Catholic Church ==
Borromeo was an active Roman Catholic for many years. As a young man, he participated in the Catholic scout movement. In 1993 he was elected president of an international Catholic association Circolo di Roma, founded in 1949, which gathers foreign diplomats accredited to the Holy See. In 2002 he was appointed a member of the Pontifical Committee for Historical Sciences. He was vice-president of the Italian National Union for the Transport of the Sick to Lourdes and International Shrines (Unitalsi).

Borromeo was a member of the Order of the Holy Sepulchre from 1985 until his death. From 1995 to 2002 he served as a Member of the Grand Magisterium. From 2002 to 2004 he was the Orders' chancellor. In 2009 Cardinal John Patrick Foley, Grand Master of the Order, appointed him General Governor. He served in this position until 29 June 2016. On 28 July 2017, he was appointed by Cardinal Edwin O'Brien, the Grand Master, as Lieutenant General of Honor.

== Death ==
Borromeo died on 4 February 2024. His funeral was presided over by the Grand Master of the Order of the Holy Sepulchre, Cardinal Fernando Filoni, and concelebrated by Cardinal Edwin O’Brien at Santi Apostoli, Rome on 6 February 2024. Also in attendance were Fra John Dunlap, Prince and Grand Master of the Sovereign Military Order of Malta, and Leonardo Visconti di Modrone, Governor-General of the Order of the Holy Sepulchre.

== Selected works ==
Borromeo was the editor and author of hundreds of publications.

- Spain in Italy: Politics, Society, and Religion 1500–1700. Edited by Thomas James Dandelet, John A. Marino, American Academy in Rome, 2006. ISBN 9004154299, ISBN 978-9004154292
- L' inquisizione : atti del simposio internazionale: Città del Vaticano, 29-31 ottobre 1998. By Agostino Borromeo. Città del Vaticano : Biblioteca Apostolica Vaticana, 2003. ISBN 8821007618 9788821007613
- Storia religiosa della Spagna. Agostino Borromeo. Milano, Centro Ambrosiano, 1998. ISBN 8880251791 9788880251798
- La Valtellina crocevia dell'Europa : politica e religione nell'età della Guerra dei trent'anni. By Agostino Borromeo; Quintín Aldea. Milano: Mondadori, 1998. OCLC Number: 954608350

== Distinctions ==
- Knight Grand Cross of the Order of St. Gregory the Great (2017)
- Knight with Collar of the Order of the Holy Sepulchre (1985)
- Knight Grand Cross of Justice of the Sacred Military Constantinian Order of Saint George
- Order of Saint Januarius (2002)
- Member of the Italian Musicology Association (Società Italiana di Musicologia) (2000)
- Academic Correspondent of the Real Academia de la Historia (1988)
- Academic Correspondent of the Academia Portuguesa da História (Portuguese Academy of History, Lisbon) (1992)

Catholic Church titles
Preceded by Pier Luigi Parola	General Governor of the Order of the Holy Sepulchre; 2009–2016	Succeeded by
