= Muslim College =

Madrasa in London, England, United Kingdom

Coordinates: 51°30′42.75″N 0°17′13.99″W

- Established: 1983
- Religious affiliation: Islam
- Location: London, United Kingdom

The Muslim College is a postgraduate Islamic seminary situated in Ealing, West London, that trains imams and religious leaders and provides Islamic education and training programmes for its students.

== History ==
The college was officially incorporated in 1983 but didn't open to students until 1987.

In February 2004, the college was visited by Charles III (then known as the Prince of Wales).

== Principals ==
Zaki Badawi was principal of the College from 1986 until his death in 2006. Dr Mosa Albezi is the current principal.
