= Francis II of the Two Sicilies =

King of the Two Sicilies from 1859 to 1861

Francis II
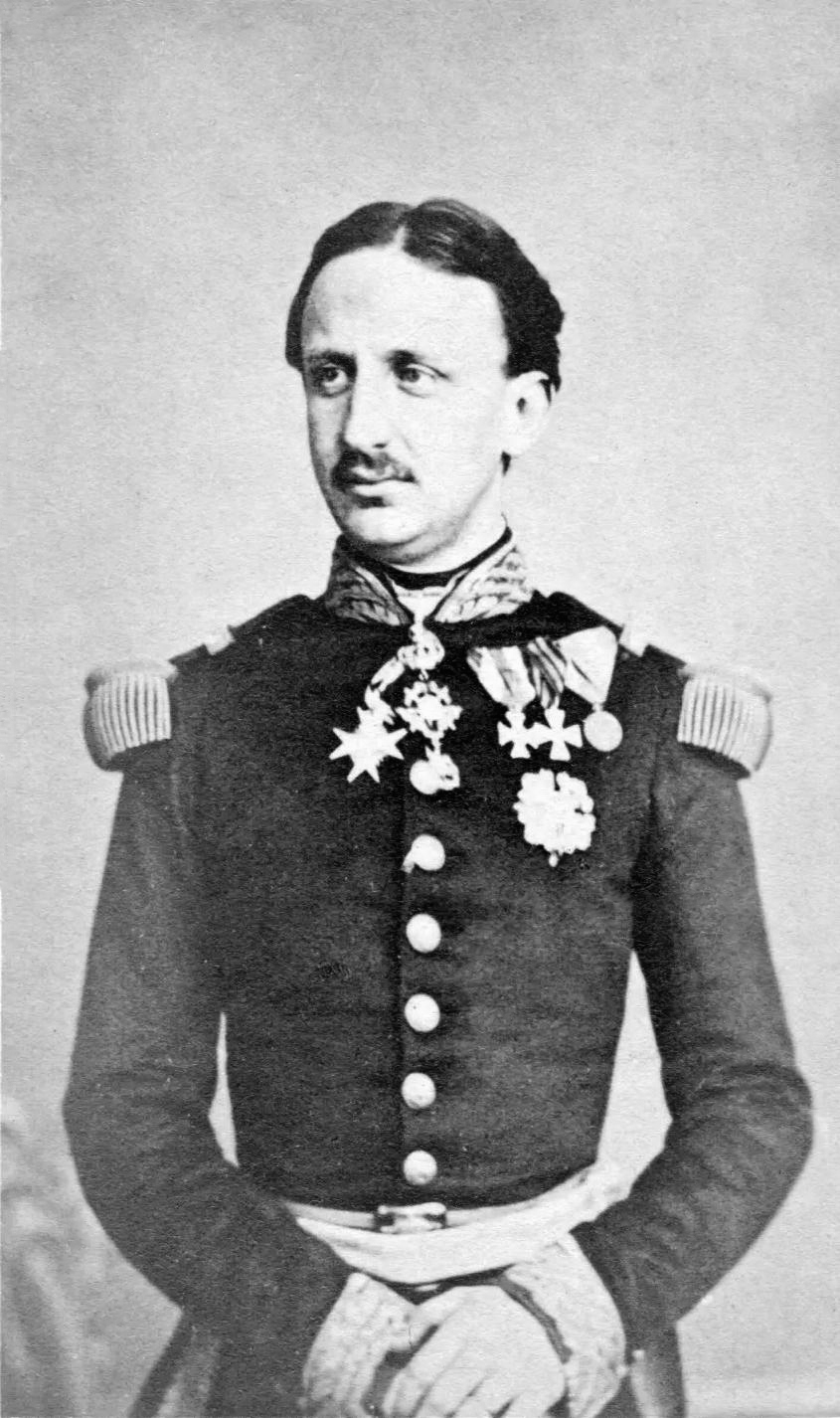
- Formal portrait, c. 1865

King of the Two Sicilies
- Reign: 22 May 1859 – 17 March 1861
- Predecessor: Ferdinand II
- Successor: Position abolished Land seized by Kingdom of Sardinia under Victor Emmanuel II

Head of the House of Bourbon-Two Sicilies
- Tenure: 17 March 1861 – 27 December 1894
- Successor: Prince Alfonso
- Born: 16 January 1836; Royal Palace of Naples, Two Sicilies
- Died: 27 December 1894 (aged 58); Arco, Austria-Hungary
- Burial: Basilica of Santa Chiara, Naples
- Spouse: Maria Sophie of Bavaria (m. 1859)
- Issue: Princess Maria Cristina Pia of Bourbon-Two Sicilies
Names
- Italian: Francesco d'Assisi Maria Leopoldo
- House: House of Bourbon-Two Sicilies
- Father: Ferdinand II
- Mother: Maria Christina of Savoy
- Religion: Catholicism

Francis II (Neapolitan and Italian: Francesco II; Sicilian: Francischieddu; christened Francesco d'Assisi Maria Leopoldo; 16 January 1836 – 27 December 1894) was the last king of the Two Sicilies before the Italian unification, led by Giuseppe Garibaldi and Victor Emmanuel II of Sardinia. After he was deposed, the Kingdom of the Two Sicilies and the Kingdom of Sardinia were merged into the newly formed Kingdom of Italy.

== Early life ==
The only son and heir of King Ferdinand II of the Two Sicilies by his first wife, Maria Christina of Savoy, Francis II was the last of the Bourbon kings of Naples, where he was born in 1836. His education had been much neglected and he proved a man of weak character, greatly influenced by his stepmother, Archduchess Maria Theresa of Austria, whom he feared, and also by the priests and the camarilla, the reactionary court set.

On 3 February 1859 in Bari, Francis married Duchess Maria Sophie of Bavaria, of the ducal Bavarian house of Wittelsbach (a younger sister of Empress Empress Elisabeth of Austria ('Sissi')). However, their marriage was unhappy. Their only daughter, Maria Cristina Pia, was born ten years after her parents married and lived only three months (24 December 1869 – 28 March 1870).

== Reign ==
Francis II took the throne on 22 May 1859, after the death of his father. For the post of prime minister, he at once appointed Carlo Filangieri, who realised the importance of the Franco-Piedmontese victories in Lombardy and advised Francis II to accept the alliance with the Kingdom of Sardinia proposed by Cavour. On 7 June, a part of the Swiss Guard mutinied, and while the King mollified them by promising to redress their grievances, General Alessandro Nunziante gathered his troops, who surrounded the mutineers and shot them down. The incident resulted in the disbanding of the whole Swiss Guard, which was the strongest bulwark of the Bourbon dynasty.

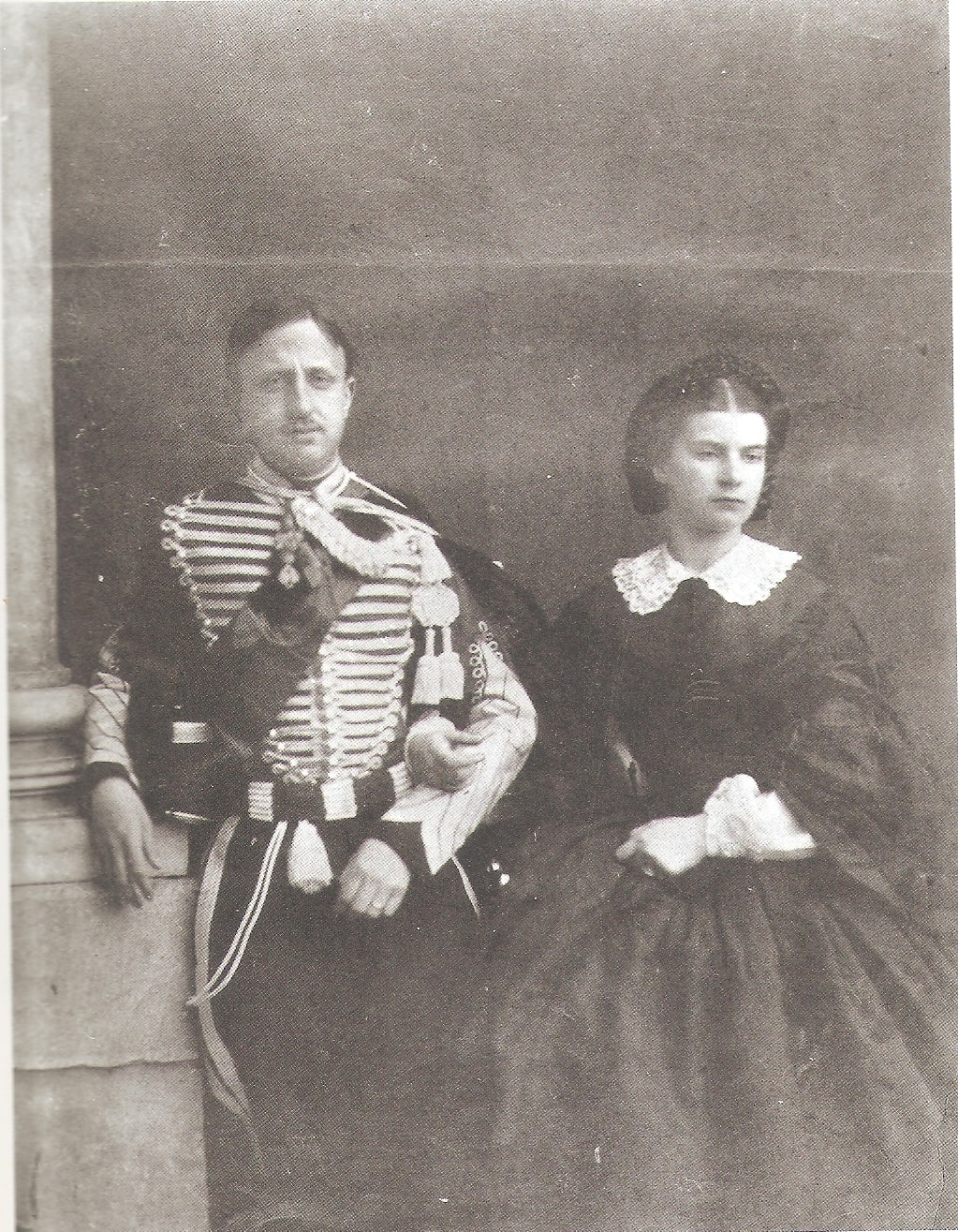
Francis II photographed with his wife Maria Sophie c. 1860

Cavour again proposed an alliance to divide the Papal States between Piedmont and Naples (the province of Rome excepted), but Francis rejected the idea, which to him seemed like heresy. Filangieri strongly advocated a constitution as the only measure which might save the dynasty, but on the King's refusal, he resigned.

=== Garibaldi's invasion ===
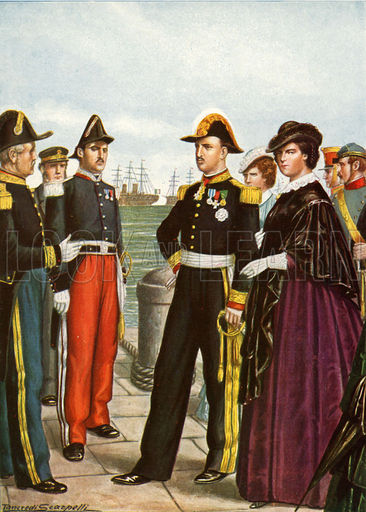
King Francis II of Naples and Queen Maria Sofia leave Gaeta of the Two Sicilies.

Meanwhile, the revolutionary parties were conspiring for the overthrow of the Bourbons in Calabria and Sicily, and Giuseppe Garibaldi was preparing for a raid in the south of Italy. A conspiracy in Sicily was discovered and the plotters punished with brutal severity, but Rosalino Pilo and Francesco Crispi, who had organised the movement, escaped execution. When Garibaldi landed at Marsala (May 1860) with his Expedition of the Thousand, he conquered the island with astonishing ease.

Those events at last coaxed Francis II into granting a constitution, but its promulgation was followed by disorders in Naples and the resignation of several ministers; Liborio Romano became head of the government. The disintegration of the army and navy proceeded apace, and Cavour sent a Piedmontese squadron carrying troops on board to watch over these events. Garibaldi had crossed the strait of Messina and was advancing northward. After long hesitations and even an appeal to Garibaldi himself and on the advice of Romano, Francis II left Naples on 6 September with his wife, Maria Sophie; the court; and the diplomatic corps (except the French and British ministers) and went by sea to Gaeta, where a large part of the army was concentrated.

The next day, Garibaldi entered Naples, was enthusiastically welcomed, and formed a provisional government.

=== Piedmontese invasion ===
King Victor Emmanuel II had decided on the invasion of the Papal States and after occupying Umbria and the Marche, he entered the Neapolitan kingdom. Garibaldi's troops defeated the Neapolitan royalists at the Battle of the Volturno, which took place on 1 October 1860, and the Piedmontese captured Capua.

By late 1860, only Gaeta, Messina and Civitella del Tronto still held out. The Siege of Gaeta by the Piedmontese began on 6 November 1860. Both Francis II and his wife behaved with great coolness and courage. Even after the French fleet, whose presence had prevented an attack by sea, was withdrawn, they still resisted. It was not until 13 February 1861 that the fortress capitulated.

== Overthrow ==
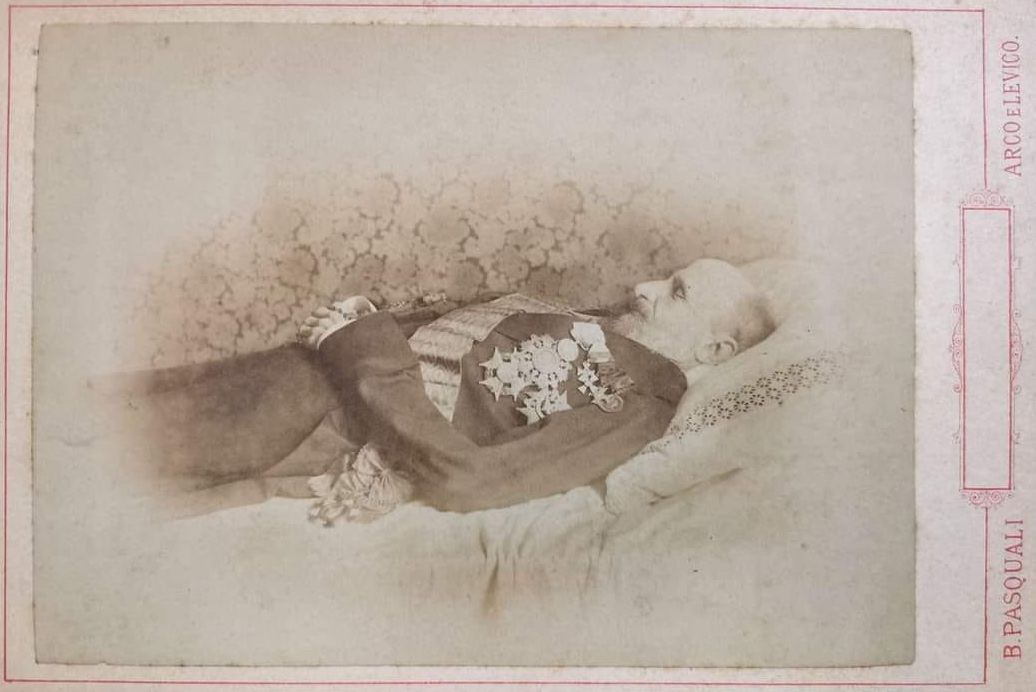
Francis on his deathbed

Thus, the Kingdom of the Two Sicilies ceased to exist, and its territory was incorporated into that of the Kingdom of Sardinia (soon renamed the Kingdom of Italy), and Francis II was deposed. Francis and Maria Sophie first lived in Rome as guests of the Pope, where they maintained a government in exile that was recognised by some Catholic powers, including France, Spain, Austria-Hungary and Bavaria. After the Prussian victory against Austria in 1866 and the subsequent expansion of Italian territory, they disbanded this government and left Rome before it was occupied by the Italians in 1870. They led a wandering life from then on by living in Austria, France and Bavaria. In 1894, Francis died at Arco in Trentino (now north-eastern Italy, but at the time in Austria-Hungary). His widow survived him by 31 years and died in Munich.

Upon the death of Francis II, his half-brother, Prince Alfonso, became the pretender to the throne of the Kingdom of the Two Sicilies.

== Cause of beatification ==
Servant of God Francis II of the Two Sicilies

On 11 December 2020, the cause of the beatification of King Francis II of the Two Sicilies was introduced by Crescenzio Cardinal Sepe, the Archbishop of Naples. Pope Francis declared the king a Servant of God.

== In popular culture ==
Francis II was portrayed by Giancarlo Giannini in the 1989 film 'O Re which was loosely based on his life. The film was well received and won several awards.

== Honours ==
Styles of Francis II of the Two Sicilies
- Reference style: His Majesty
- Spoken style: Your Majesty

- Belgium: Grand Cordon of the Order of Leopold, 9 June 1855
- Spain: Knight of the Order of the Golden Fleece, 15 June 1844
- Empire of Brazil: Grand Cross of the Order of Pedro I
- Austrian Empire:
  - Grand Cross of the Order of St. Stephen, 1849
  - Knight of the Military Order of Maria Theresa, 1861
- Kingdom of France: Knight Grand Cross of the Royal and Military Order of Saint Louis
- Kingdom of Prussia:
  - Knight of the Order of the Black Eagle, 4 June 1853
  - Pour le Mérite (military), 20 February 1861
- Kingdom of Bavaria: Knight of the Order of Saint Hubert, 1857
- Kingdom of Saxony: Knight of the Order of the Rue Crown, 1860
- Grand Duchy of Tuscany: Grand Cross of the Order of St. Joseph
- Württemberg: Grand Cross of the Order of the Württemberg Crown, 1864

== See also ==
- History of Italy
- Siege of Gaeta (1860–1861)

Francis II of the Two Sicilies House of Bourbon-Two Sicilies Cadet branch of the House of Bourbon Born: 16 January 1836 Died: 27 December 1894
Regnal titles
| Preceded by Ferdinand II | King of the Two Sicilies; 22 May 1859 – 17 March 1861 | Kingdom Abolished; Italian Unification under the House of Savoy |
Titles in pretence
| Preceded by Himself | — TITULAR — King of the Two Sicilies; 17 March 1861 – 27 December 1894 | Succeeded by Prince Alfonso, Count of Caserta |
