= Prince Alfonso, Count of Caserta =

Prince of the Two Sicilies; fourth son of Ferdinand II

Prince Alfonso
- Count of Caserta
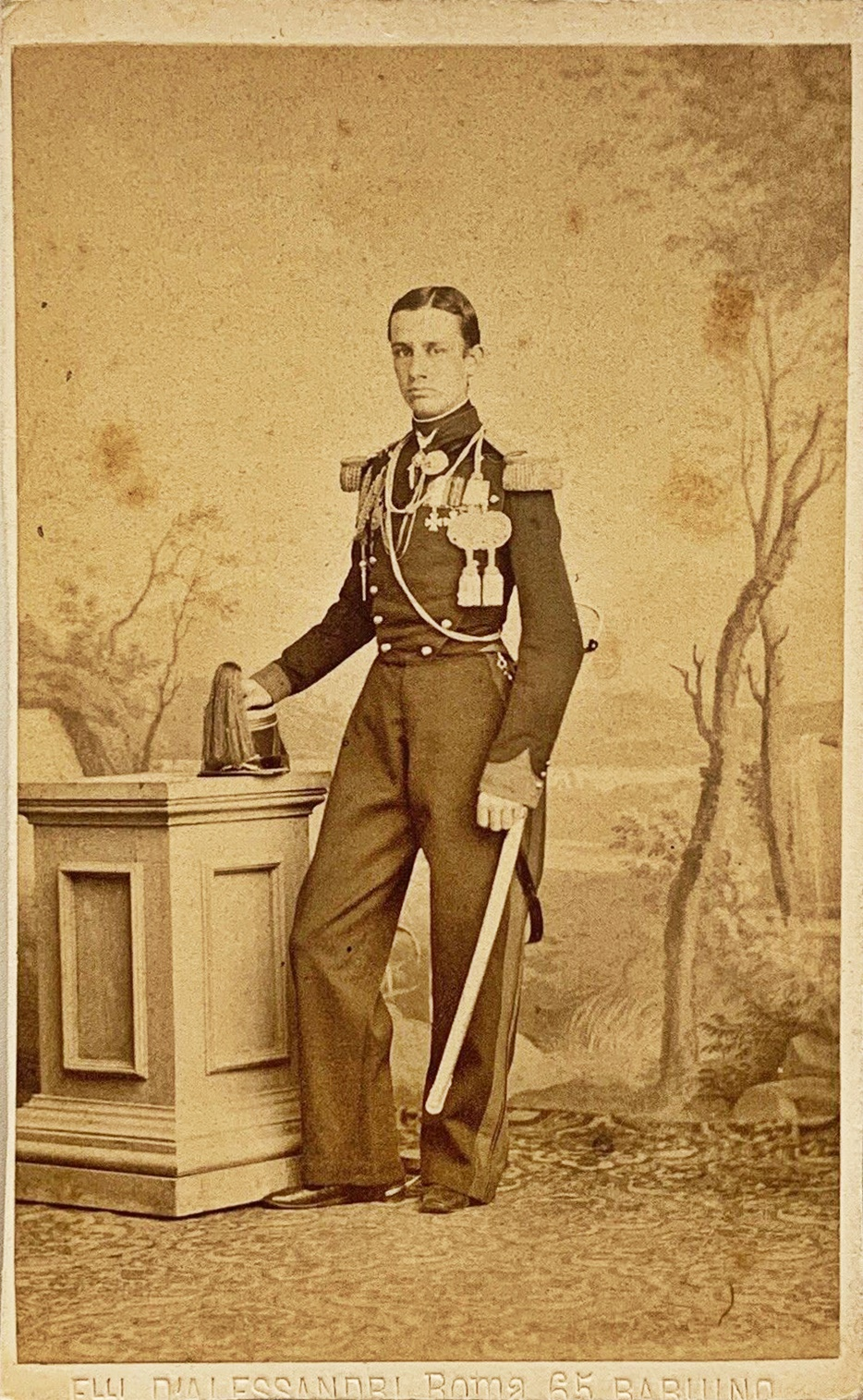
- Photograph by Fratelli D'Alessandri, c. 1860–70

Head of the House of Bourbon-Two Sicilies
- Tenure: 27 December 1894 – 26 May 1934
- Predecessor: Francis II
- Successor: Prince Ferdinand Pius
- Born: 28 March 1841; Caserta, Two Sicilies
- Died: 26 May 1934 (aged 93); Cannes, France
- Burial: Cimetière du Grand Jas, Cannes
- Spouse: Princess Maria Antonietta of the Two Sicilies (m. 1868)
- Issue: Prince Ferdinando Pio, Duke of Castro; Prince Carlos; Prince Francesco di Paola; Princess Maria Immacolata; Princess Maria Cristina; Princess Maria di Grazia; Princess Maria Giuseppina; Prince Gennaro; Prince Ranieri, Duke of Castro; Prince Filippo; Prince Francesco d'Assisi; Prince Gabriel
Names
- Italian: Alfonso Maria Giuseppe Alberto
- House: Bourbon-Two Sicilies
- Father: Ferdinand II of the Two Sicilies
- Mother: Maria Theresa of Austria

Prince Alfonso, Count of Caserta (28 March 1841 – 26 May 1934) was the third son of Ferdinand II of the Two Sicilies and Archduchess Maria Theresa of Austria.

He was pretender to the throne of the Two Sicilies in succession of his older half-brother, Francis II of the Two Sicilies. He was succeeded by his eldest son, Ferdinand Pius.

== Heir to the throne ==
Born in Caserta, Alfonso was the fourth-in-line heir to the throne of the Two Sicilies since the time of his birth. Ahead of him in line were his older half-brother Francis and older brothers Prince Louis, Count of Trani and Prince Alberto, Count of Castrogiovanni. On 12 July 1844, Alberto died, two months short of his fifth birthday and naturally childless which made Alfonso the third-in-line. On 22 May 1859, Ferdinand II died, making Francis the king. Francis had no children yet from his wife Duchess Maria Sophie in Bavaria. Louis became his heir presumptive and Alfonso the second-in-line heir to their half-brother.

The Two Sicilies were conquered by the Expedition of the Thousand under Giuseppe Garibaldi in 1861 leading to the end of the Kingdom of Two Sicilies. Garibaldi served the Kingdom of Sardinia which was in the process of Italian unification. The deposed royal house survived with Francis still at its head, even though he was no longer king. On 8 June 1886, Louis died. His only daughter Princess Maria Teresa was not in line for the throne, because females were barred from succession. Louis' death made Alfonso the heir presumptive to Francis, who had survived his own daughter. On 27 December 1894, Francis II died, making Alfonso the head of the House of Bourbon-Two Sicilies. Alfonso later died at Cannes on May 26, 1934.

== Personal life ==
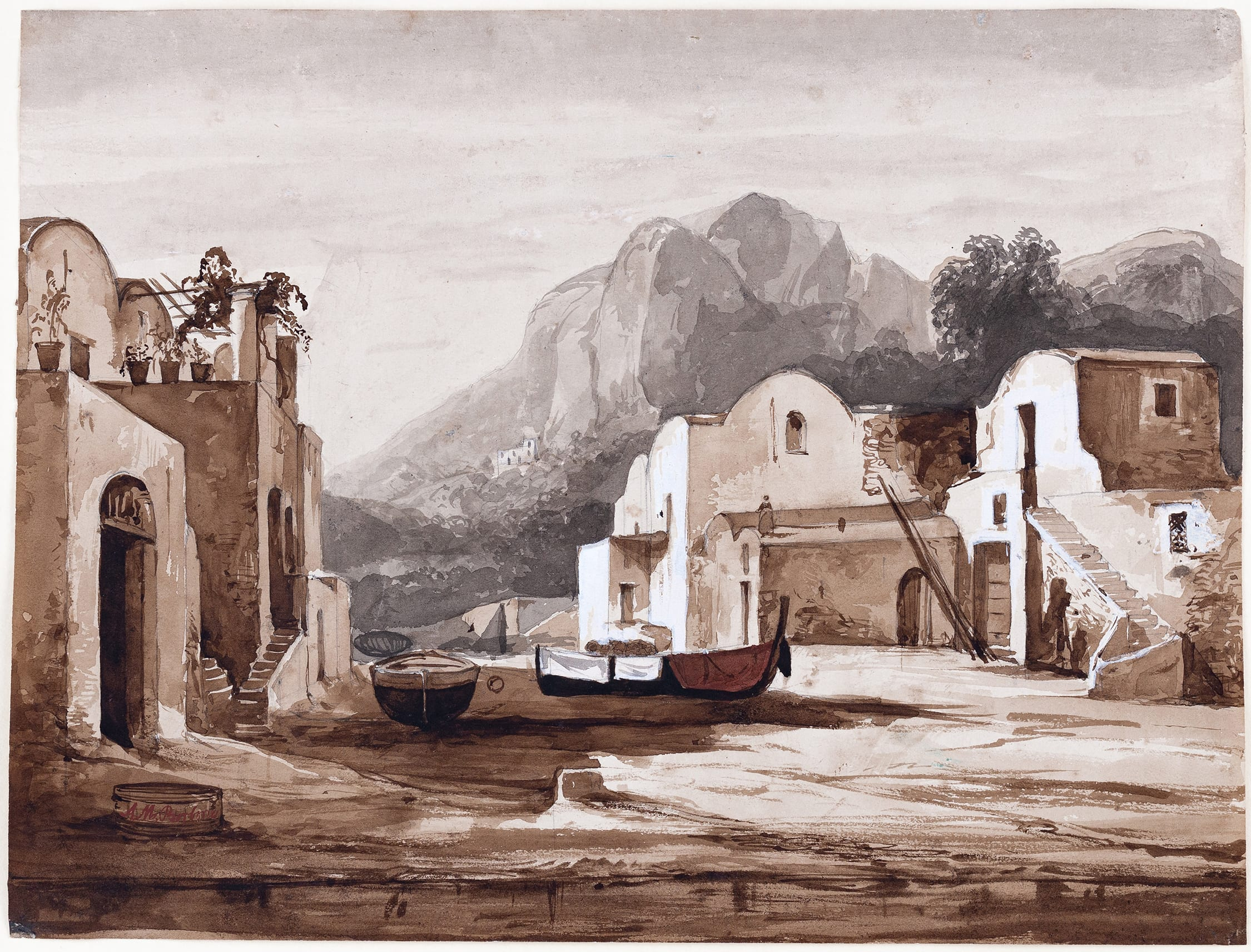
Capri (circa 1855) by Alfonso, assisted by Achille Vianelli

Alfonso was also an artist, and received tuition from Achille Vianelli.

== Marriage and issue ==
Alfonso was married to his cousin, Princess Maria Antonietta of Bourbon-Two Sicilies (16 March 1851 – 12 September 1938) on 8 June 1868. She was a daughter of Prince Francis, Count of Trapani and his wife Archduchess Maria Isabella of Austria, Princess of Tuscany.

Her paternal grandparents were Francis I of the Two Sicilies and his second wife Maria Isabella of Spain. Her maternal grandparents were Leopold II, Grand Duke of Tuscany and his second wife Maria Antonietta of the Two Sicilies.

Maria Isabella was a daughter of Charles IV of Spain and Maria Luisa of Parma. Maria Antonietta was another daughter of Francis I of the Two Sicilies and Maria Isabella of Spain.

They had twelve children.

- Prince Ferdinand Pius of Bourbon-Two Sicilies, Duke of Calabria (25 July 1869 – 17 January 1960)

∞ Princess Maria Ludwiga Theresia of Bavaria, daughter of Ludwig III of Bavaria. This marriage produced six children.

- Prince Carlos of Bourbon-Two Sicilies (10 November 1870 – 11 November 1949)

∞ Mercedes, Princess of Asturias, daughter of Alfonso XII of Spain. This marriage produced three issue.
∞ Princess Louise of Orléans, daughter of Prince Philippe of Orléans, Count of Paris. This marriage produced four children.

- Prince Francesco di Paola of Bourbon-Two Sicilies (14 July 1873 – 26 June 1876)
- Princess Maria Immaculata of Bourbon-Two Sicilies (30 October 1874 – 28 November 1947)

∞ Prince Johann Georg of Saxony, son of George of Saxony. This marriage produced no issue.

- Princess Maria Cristina of Bourbon-Two Sicilies (10 April 1877 – 4 October 1947)

∞ Archduke Peter Ferdinand of Austria, Prince of Tuscany, son of Ferdinand IV, Grand Duke of Tuscany. This marriage produced four children.

- Princess Maria di Grazia of Bourbon-Two Sicilies (12 August 1878 – 20 June 1973)

∞ Prince Luiz Maria of Orléans-Braganza, son of Isabel, Princess Imperial of Brazil. This marriage produced three children.

- Princess Maria Giuseppina of Bourbon-Two Sicilies (25 February 1880 – 22 July 1971)
- Prince Gennaro of Bourbon-Two Sicilies (24 January 1882 – 11 April 1944)

∞ Beatrice Bordessa, created Countess of Villa Colli, born into a bourgeois Italian family from Chester in the North of England. This marriage produced no issue.

- Prince Ranieri of Bourbon-Two Sicilies, Duke of Castro (3 December 1883 – 13 January 1973)

∞ Countess Maria Carolina Zamoyska, daughter of Andrzej Przemysław Zamoyski, Count Zamoyski. This marriage produced two children.

- Prince Filippo of Bourbon-Two Sicilies (10 December 1885 – 9 March 1949)

∞ Princess Marie Louise of Orléans, daughter of Prince Emmanuel of Orléans, Duke of Vendôme. This marriage produced one child.
∞ Odette Labori, daughter of the French attorney Fernand Labori. This marriage produced no issue.

- Prince Francesco d'Assisi of Bourbon-Two Sicilies (13 January 1888 – 26 March 1914)
- Prince Gabriel of Bourbon-Two Sicilies (1 January 1897 – 22 October 1975)

∞ Princess Malgorzata Izabella Czartoryska, daughter of Prince Adam Ludwik Czartoryski. This marriage produced one child.
∞ Princess Cecylia Lubomirska, daughter of Prince Kasimierz Lubomirski. This marriage produced four children.

== Honours and arms ==
=== Orders and decorations ===
- Austrian Empire:
  - Knight of the Military Order of Maria Theresa, 1861
  - Grand Cross of the Royal Hungarian Order of Saint Stephen, 1894
- Spain: Grand Cross of the Royal and Distinguished Order of Charles III, 28 January 1871
- Kingdom of Bavaria: Knight of the Royal Order of Saint Hubert, 1895

=== Arms ===
Heraldry of Prince Alfonso, Count of Caserta

Prince Alfonso's arms as Count of Caserta c.1840-1886

Prince Alfonso's arms as titular heir to the throne 1886-1894

Prince Alfonso's arms as head of the Royal House 1894-1934

== Notes ==
Prince Alfonso, Count of Caserta House of Bourbon-Two Sicilies Cadet branch of the House of Bourbon Born: 28 March 1841 Died: 26 May 1934
Titles in pretence
Preceded by Francis II	— TITULAR — King of the Two Sicilies; 27 December 1894 – 26 May 1934; Reason for succession failure: Italian Unification under the House of Savoy	Succeeded by Prince Ferdinand Pius, Duke of Calabria
