= Princess Maria Immacolata of Bourbon-Two Sicilies (1874–1947) =

French princess

Princess Maria Immaculata
- Princess Johann Georg of Saxony
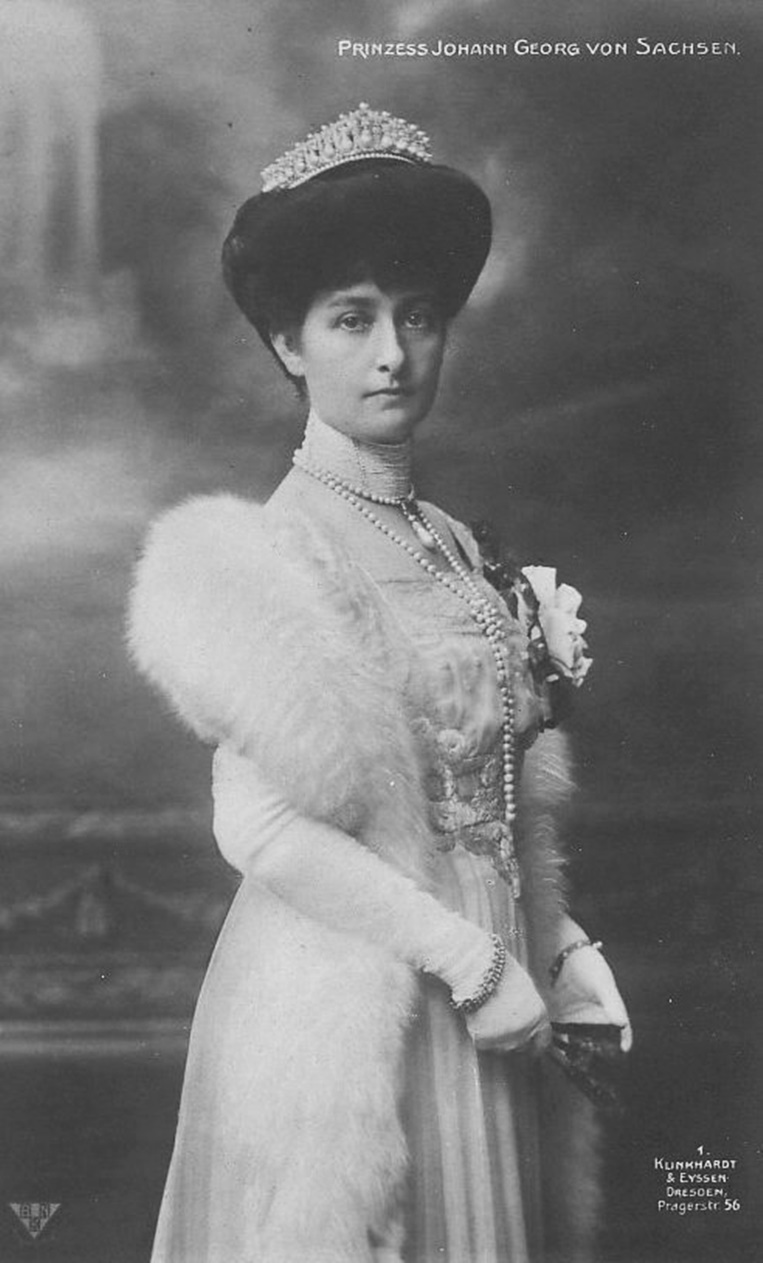
- Born: 30 October 1874; Cannes, France
- Died: 28 November 1947 (aged 73); Muri, Switzerland
- Burial: Hedinger Kirche in Sigmaringen, Germany
- Spouse: Prince Johann Georg of Saxony (m. 1906; died 1938)
Names
- Italian: Maria Immacolata Speranza Pia Teresa Cristina Filomena Lucia Anna Isabella Cecilia Apollonia Barbara Agnese Zenobia di Borbone
- House: House of Bourbon-Two Sicilies (by birth); House of Wettin (by marriage)
- Father: Prince Alfonso, Count of Caserta
- Mother: Princess Maria Antonietta of the Two Sicilies

Princess Maria Immaculata Cristina Pia Isabella of Bourbon-Two Sicilies (Full Italian name: Maria Immacolata Speranza Pia Teresa Cristina Filomena Lucia Anna Isabella Cecilia Apollonia Barbara Agnese Zenobia, Principessa di Borbone delle Due Sicilie,) (30 October 1874 – 28 November 1947) was the fourth child and eldest daughter of Prince Alfonso of Bourbon-Two Sicilies, Count of Caserta, and his wife Princess Maria Antonietta of Bourbon-Two Sicilies.

== Marriage ==
Maria Immaculata married Prince Johann Georg of Saxony, sixth child and second-eldest son of George of Saxony and his wife Maria Anna of Portugal, on 30 October 1906 in Cannes. Her mother-in-law, Maria Anna, was the daughter of Maria II of Portugal and her husband Ferdinand II of Portugal.

The couple did not have children, but Maria Immaculata cared for the children of her brother-in-law Frederick Augustus III of Saxony.
