= Vyšné Ružbachy =

- Municipality
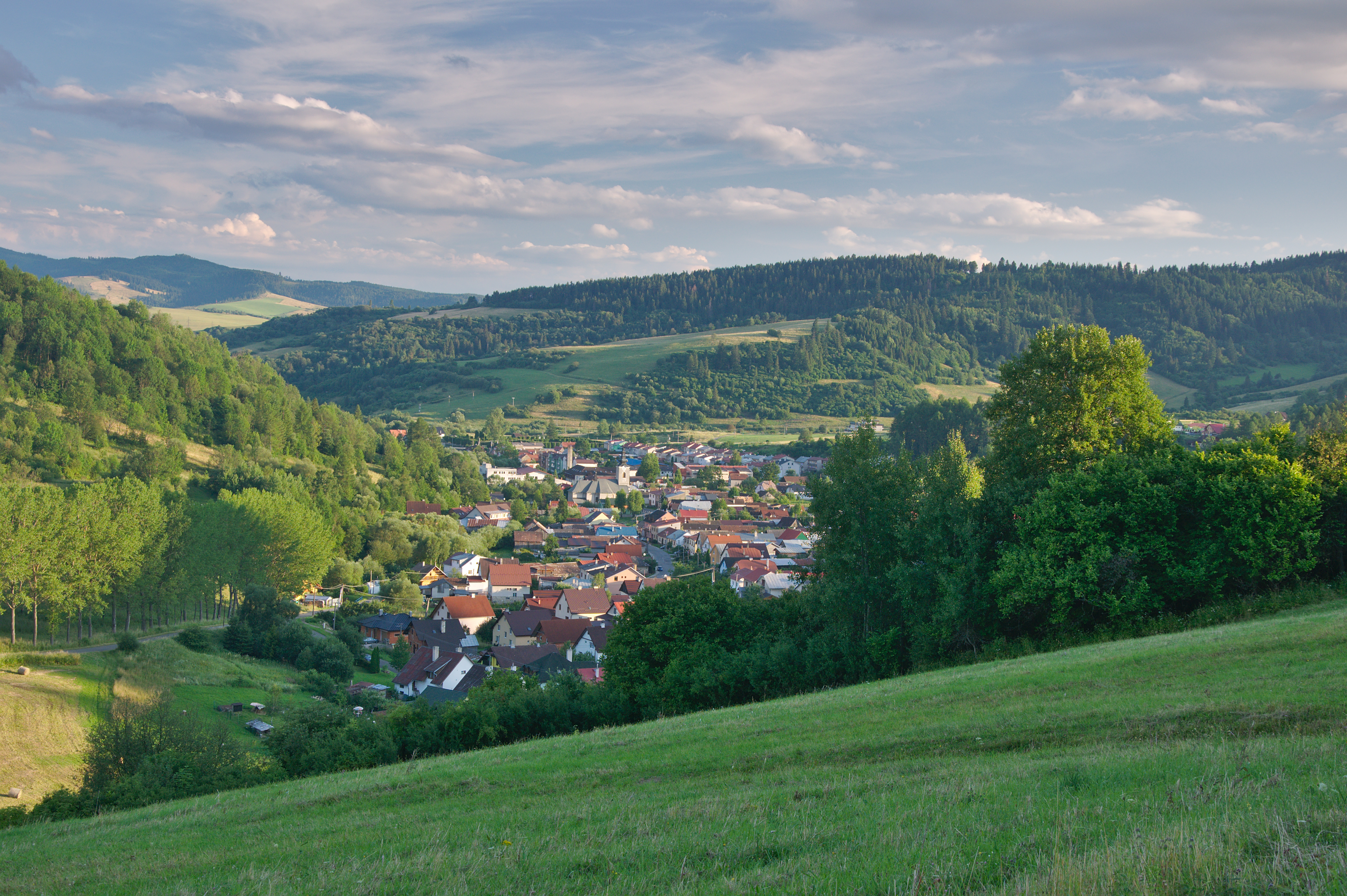

- Flag

- Location of Vyšné Ružbachy in the Prešov Region Location of Vyšné Ružbachy in Slovakia
- Coordinates: 49.30°N 20.57°E
- Country: Slovakia
- Region: Prešov Region
- District: Stará Ľubovňa District
- First mentioned: 1329

Area
  - Total: 17.95 km^{2} (6.93 sq mi)
- Elevation: 625 m (2,051 ft)

Population (2025)
  - Total: 1,465
- Time zone: UTC+1 (CET)
  - Summer (DST): UTC+2 (CEST)
- Postal code: 650 2
- Area code: +421 52
- Vehicle registration plate (until 2022): SL
- Website: www.obecvysneruzbachy.sk

Vyšné Ružbachy (German: Oberrauschenbach; Hungarian: Felsőzúgó, Rusyn: Вышнї Ружбахы) is a spa village and municipality in Stará Ľubovňa District in the Prešov Region of northern Slovakia.

== History ==
In historical records the village was first mentioned in 1329. Before the establishment of independent Czechoslovakia in 1918, Vyšné Ružbachy was part of Szepes County within the Kingdom of Hungary. From 1939 to 1945, it was part of the Slovak Republic. On 25 January 1945, the Red Army dislodged the Wehrmacht from Vyšné Ružbachy and it was once again part of Czechoslovakia.

== Geography ==
The municipality lies at an altitude of 625 metres (2,051 ft) and covers an area of 17.95 km^{2} (6.93 sq mi) (2025).

== Population ==
Population statistic (10 years)
Year	1995	2005	2015	2025
Count	1171	1288	1403	1465
Difference		+9.99%	+8.92%	+4.41%

Population statistic
Year	2024	2025
Count	1443	1465
Difference		+1.52%

It has a population of 1465 people (31 December 2025).

=== Ethnicity ===
Census 2021 (1+ %)
Ethnicity	Number	Fraction
Slovak	1373	97.79%
Romani	45	3.2%
Not found out	43	3.06%
Rusyn	20	1.42%
Total	1404	

In year 2021 was 1404 people by ethnicity 1373 as Slovak, 45 as Romani, 43 as Not found out, 20 as Rusyn, 9 as Polish, 5 as Czech, 5 as Ukrainian, 3 as German, 3 as Hungarian, 2 as Austrian, 1 as Russian and 1 as French.

Note on population: The difference values of population numbers in the table "Population statistic" and in the sections "Ethnicity" & "Religion" is caused by the use of various statistical methods.

=== Religion ===
Census 2021 (1+ %)
Religion	Number	Fraction
Roman Catholic Church	1218	86.75%
Greek Catholic Church	77	5.48%
None	65	4.63%
Not found out	21	1.5%
Total	1404	

In year 2021 was 1404 people by religion 1218 from Roman Catholic Church, 77 from Greek Catholic Church, 65 from None, 21 from Not found out, 8 from Evangelical Church, 6 from Eastern Orthodox Church, 4 from Ad hoc movements, 3 from Jehovah's Witnesses, 1 from Calvinist Church and 1 from Other and not ascertained christian church.
