= Lacombe, Aude =

Commune in Occitanie, France

Lacombe
- Commune
- Coat of arms
- Location of Lacombe
- Location within France Location within Occitanie
- Coordinates: 43°23′54″N 2°14′04″E
- Country: France
- Region: Occitania
- Department: Aude
- Arrondissement: Carcassonne
- Canton: La Malepère à la Montagne Noire

Government
  - Mayor (2020–2026): Benoît Soulié
- Area^{1}: 14.99 km^{2} (5.79 sq mi)
- Elevation: 750 m (2,460 ft)
- Highest elevation: 886 m (2,907 ft)
- Lowest elevation: 605 m (1,985 ft)
- Population (2023): 188
  - Density: 12.5/km^{2} (32.5/sq mi)
- Time zone: UTC+01:00 (CET)
  - Summer (DST): UTC+02:00 (CEST)
- INSEE/Postal code: 11182 /11310
- ^{1} French Land Register data, which excludes lakes, ponds, glaciers > 1 km^{2} (0.386 sq mi or 247 acres) and river estuaries.

Lacombe (French pronunciation: [lakɔ̃b]; Occitan: La Comba) is a commune in the Aude department in southern France.

== Population ==
Historical population
Year	Pop.	±% p.a.
1968	153	—
1975	163	+0.91%
1982	150	−1.18%
1990	139	−0.95%
1999	114	−2.18%
2007	164	+4.65%
2012	168	+0.48%
2017	172	+0.47%
2023	188	+1.49%
Source: INSEE

== See also ==
- Communes of the Aude department
