= Order of Saint Januarius =

Roman Catholic order of knighthood

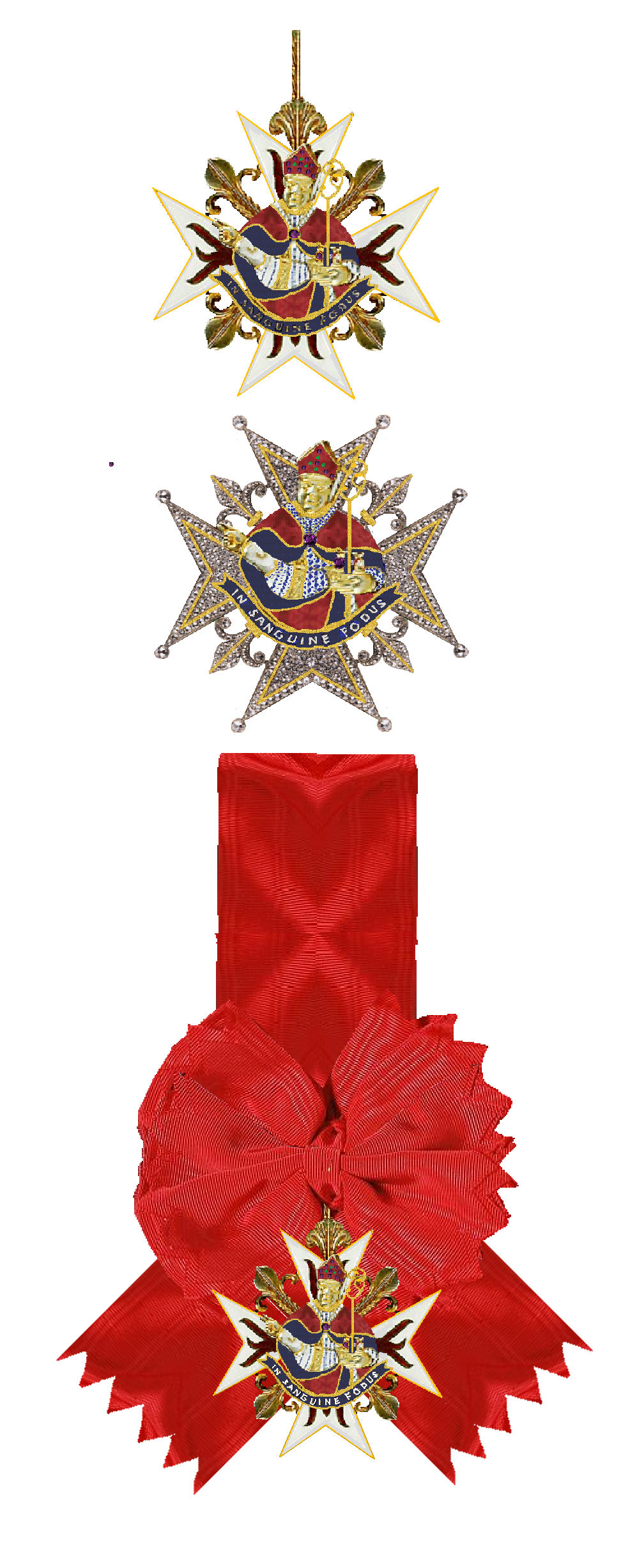
- Star and badge of the order

Awarded by the House of Bourbon-Two Sicilies
- Type: Dynastic order
- Established: 3 July 1738
- Country: Kingdom of Naples; Kingdom of the Two Sicilies
- Motto: IN SANGUINE FOEDUS (English: Union in Blood)
- Founder: Charles of Bourbon
- Grand Master: Disputed: Prince Pedro, Duke of Calabria; Prince Carlo, Duke of Castro

Precedence
- Next (higher): None
- Next (lower): Sacred Military Constantinian Order of Saint George
- Ribbon of the order

The Illustrious Royal Order of Saint Januarius (Italian: Insigne Reale Ordine di San Gennaro) is a Roman Catholic order of knighthood founded in 1738 by Charles of Bourbon, king of Naples and Sicily (as Charles VII and III, respectively) from 1735 until 1759, and later king of Spain (1759–1788).

Named after saint Januarius, patron of Naples, it was the last great dynastic order to be constituted as a chivalric fraternity, with a limitation to Roman Catholics and a direct attachment to the dynasty rather than the state. Since 1960, the grand magistery of the order is disputed among claimants to the headship of the formerly reigning House of Bourbon-Two Sicilies.

== Structure of the order ==
Originally, the order had four principal officers, whose duties were to administer its affairs:

- Chancellor
- Secretary
- Treasurer
- Master of Ceremonies

A reform of 17 August 1827, limited these duties to certain ceremonial roles at the installation of knights, and no successors were appointed to the then-holders of these offices.

== The order today ==
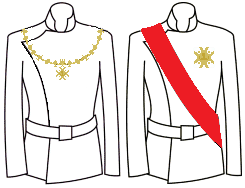
Decoration with collar (left) and with sash and star (right)

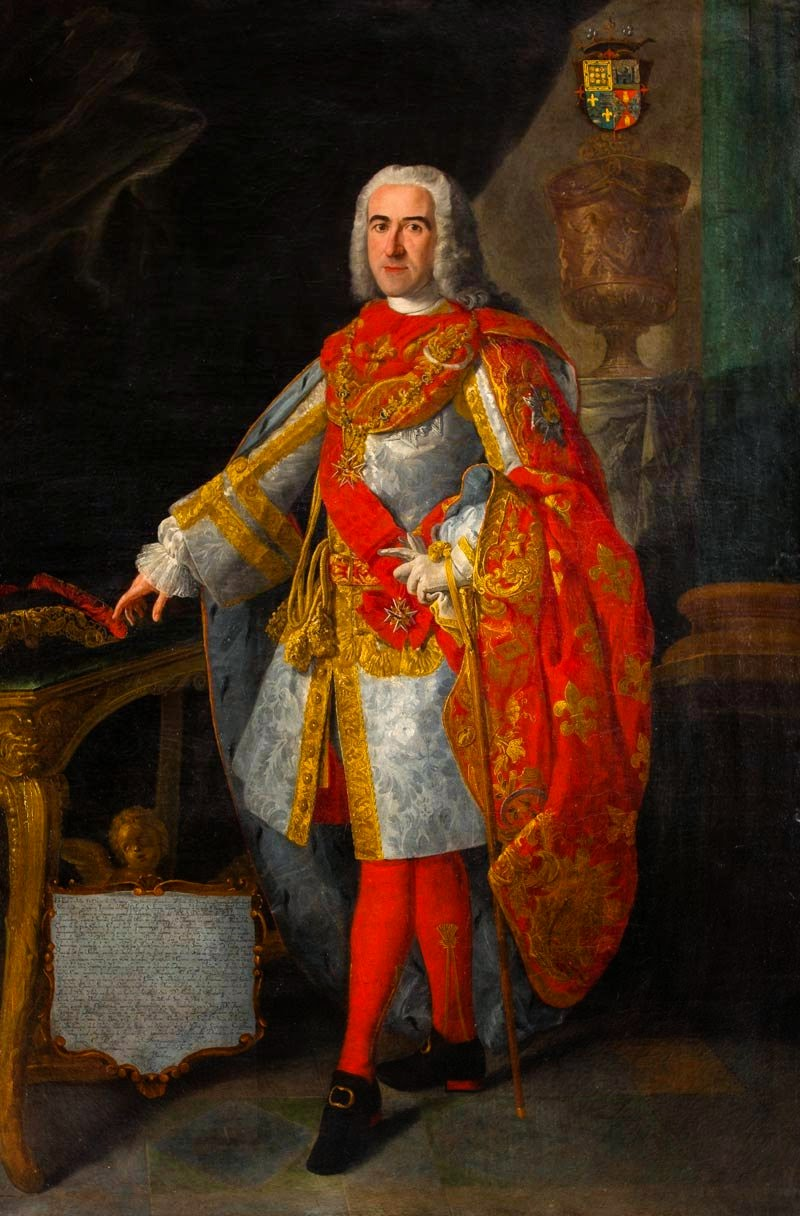
Diego de Madariaga, 2nd Marquess of Villa-Fuerte wearing the mantle and insignia of the order

Since 1960, because of the succession dispute, the order has been awarded sparingly and total membership has not exceeded eighty, most of the knights being members of royal houses, senior officers of the Sacred Military Constantinian Order of Saint George, or Italian grandees.

As of 2025, the order continues to be awarded today by the two claimants to the headship of the royal House of Bourbon-Two Sicilies, Prince Pedro, Duke of Calabria and Prince Carlo, Duke of Castro.

=== Members ===
As of 2016, the knights appointed by Prince Pedro, Duke of Calabria, his father and grandfather, were:

- HM King Juan Carlos I of Spain, 19 February 1960.
- HM King Simeon II of the Bulgarians, 30 March 1960.
- HRH Dom Duarte Pio, Duke of Braganza, 2 October 1990.
- HRH Alexander Karageorgevich of Serbia, 8 January 1991.
- HIRH Archduke Simeon of Austria, 4 November 2002.
- Don Vincenzo-Capasso Torre, XVI Count delle Pastène and V Conte of Caprara, 14 June 1960.
- Don Iñigo de Moreno e Arteaga, 1 Marquess of Laserna, 6 January 1961
- Hervé Pinoteau, VI Baron Pinoteau, 13 April 1963.
- Don José-Maria de Palacio y Oriol, IV Marquess of Villarreal de Alava, 19 September 1972
- HE Don Carlos Fitz-James Stuart, 19th Duke of Alba de Tormes, Berwick, Liria and Xerica, Grandee of Spain, 2 October 1990.
- Count Don Agostino Borromeo, 25 September 2002.
- Don Roberto Dentice di Accadia, Marquess of Accadia, 25 September 2002.
- Prince Don Alberto Giovanelli, 25 September 2002.
- HSH Prince and Marquess Don Maurizio Ferrante Gonzaga di Vescovato, 5 September 2002.
- Noble Don Alesandro of the Counts Mariotti Solimani, 25 September 2002.
- Nobile Don Lorenzo de' Notaristefani, 25 September 2002.
- Ambassador Don Giuseppe Bonanno, Prince of Linguaglossa, (... 2003).
- Guy Stair Sainty
- HEm Cardinal Dario Castrillón Hoyos, April 2016.

As of 2014, the knights appointed by Prince Carlo, Duke of Castro, his father and grandfather, were:

- Prince Carlo, Duke of Castro and Grand Master
- Antonio Maria of Bourbon Two Sicilies
- Francesco Maria of Bourbon Two Sicilies
- Gennaro Maria of Bourbon Two Sicilies
- Luigi Alfonso Maria of Bourbon Two Sicilies
- Alessandro Enrico Maria of Bourbon Two Sicilies
- Casimiro Maria of Bourbon Two Sicilies
- HMSH Fra' Matthew Festing, 80th Prince and Grand Master of the Sovereign Military Order of Malta
- Duarte Pio, Duke of Braganza
- Jean, Count of Paris (19 March 2019, installed 13 May 2019)
- Renato Raffaele Cardinal Martino
- Count Andrzej Ciechanowiecki +2015
- Ambassador Count Carlo Marullo di Condojanni, Prince of Casalnuovo
- Duke and Count Don Ferdinando Gaetani dell'Aquila d'Aragona, Prince of Piedmont, Duke of Laurenzana, Count of Alife,
- Duke Francesco d'Avalos, Prince of the Holy Roman Empire, Marquess of Pescara and Vasto
- Prince Filippo Massimo, Prince of Arsoli and Duke of Anticoli Corrado
- Prince Carlo Cito Filomarino, Prince of Rocca d'Aspro, Prince of Bitetto, Marquess of Torrecuso
- Prince Gregorio Carafa Cantelmo Stuart, Prince of the Holy Roman Empire, Prince of Roccella, Duke of Bruzzano
- Don Roberto Caracciolo, Duke of San Vito
- Prince Giovanni Battista de' Medici, Prince of Ottajano, Duke of Casalnuovo

== See also ==
- Order of Saint Ferdinand and of Merit
- Order of Saint George and Reunion
- Royal Order of Francis I
- Sacred Military Constantinian Order of Saint George
