= List of monarchs of the Kingdom of the Two Sicilies =

King of the Two Sicilies
- Royal Coat of arms

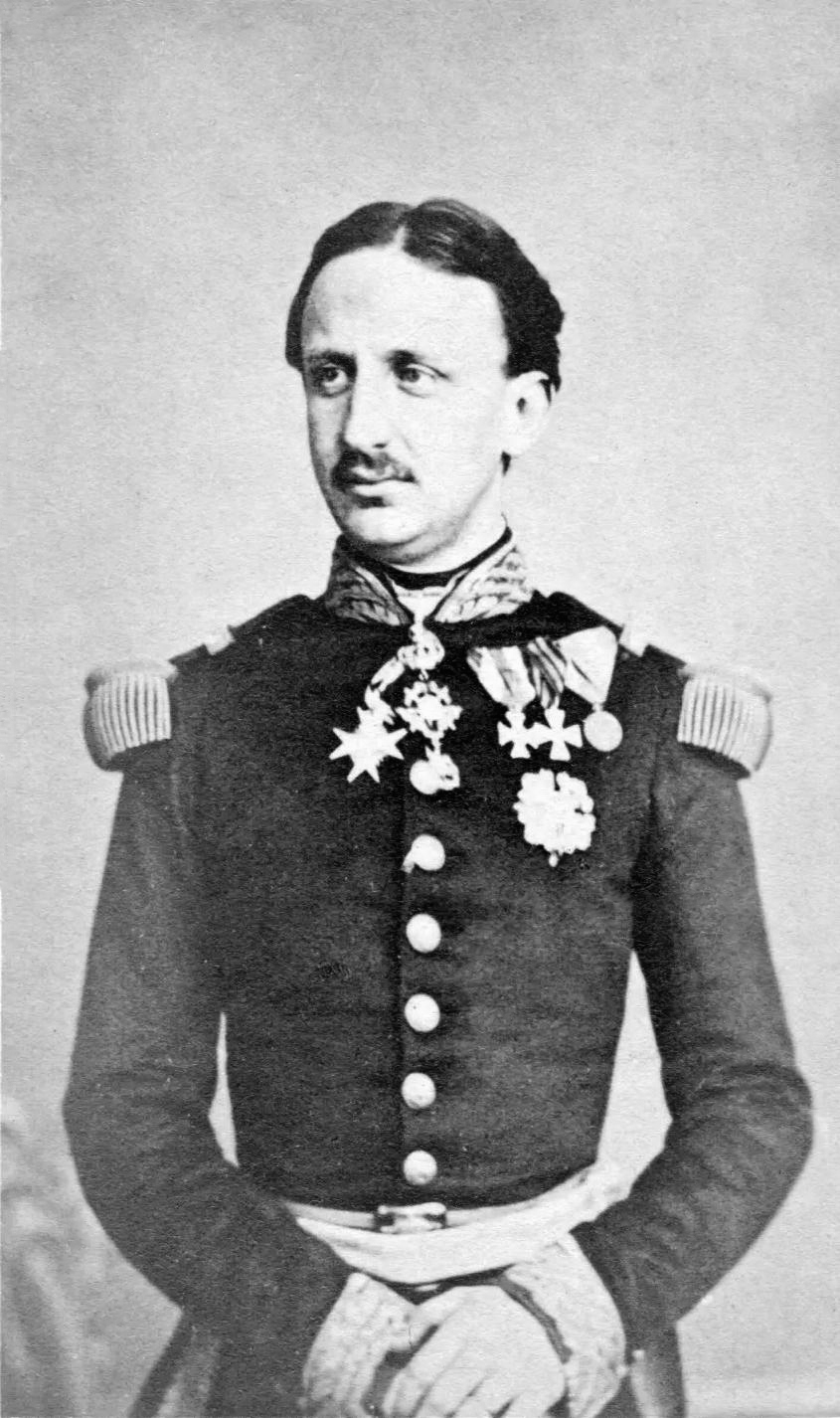
- Francis II, last king of the Two Sicilies

Details
- First monarch: Ferdinand I
- Last monarch: Francis II
- Formed: 1816
- Abolished: 1861
- Residences: Royal Palace of Naples; Palace of Caserta; Palace of Portici; Palace of Capodimonte
- Pretenders: Disputed: Prince Pedro, Duke of Calabria (Calabrian line); Prince Carlo, Duke of Castro (Castrian line)

The Kingdom of the Two Sicilies in Southern Italy was ruled by monarchs from its establishment in 1816 to its incorporation into the Kingdom of Italy in 1861.

== History ==
Joachim Murat was the first king to rule a kingdom called "Two Sicilies" by the Edict of Bayonne, in 1808. Though he controlled the mainland, he never physically controlled the island of Sicily, where his Bourbon rival had fled from Naples.

After the Congress of Vienna in 1815, the title of king of Two Sicilies was adopted by Ferdinand IV of Naples in 1816. Under Ferdinand's rule, the Kingdom of Naples and the Kingdom of Sicily were unified. He had previously been king separately of both Naples and Sicily.

== List of kings ==
Portrait	Name	Arms	Reign	Succession	Life details
	Ferdinand I Ferdinando I		12 December 1816 – 4 January 1825 (8 years and 23 days)	Son of Charles III of Spain	12 January 1751 – 4 January 1825 (aged 73)
	Francis I Francesco I		4 January 1825 – 8 November 1830 (5 years, 10 months and 4 days)	Son of Ferdinand I	19 August 1777 – 8 November 1830 (aged 53)
	Ferdinand II; Ferdinando II		8 November 1830 – 22 May 1859 (28 years, 6 months and 14 days)	Son of Francis I	12 January 1810 – 22 May 1859 (aged 49)
	Francis II; Francesco II		22 May 1859 – 20 March 1861 (1 year, 9 months and 26 days)	Son of Ferdinand II	16 January 1836 – 27 December 1894 (aged 58)

== See also ==
- List of consorts of the Kingdom of the Two Sicilies
- List of monarchs of Naples
- List of monarchs of Sicily
- County of Apulia and Calabria
- Descendants of Charles III of Spain
- House of Bourbon
