= Franz Joseph, Prince of Hohenzollern-Emden =

German prince (1891–1964)

Prince Franz Joseph
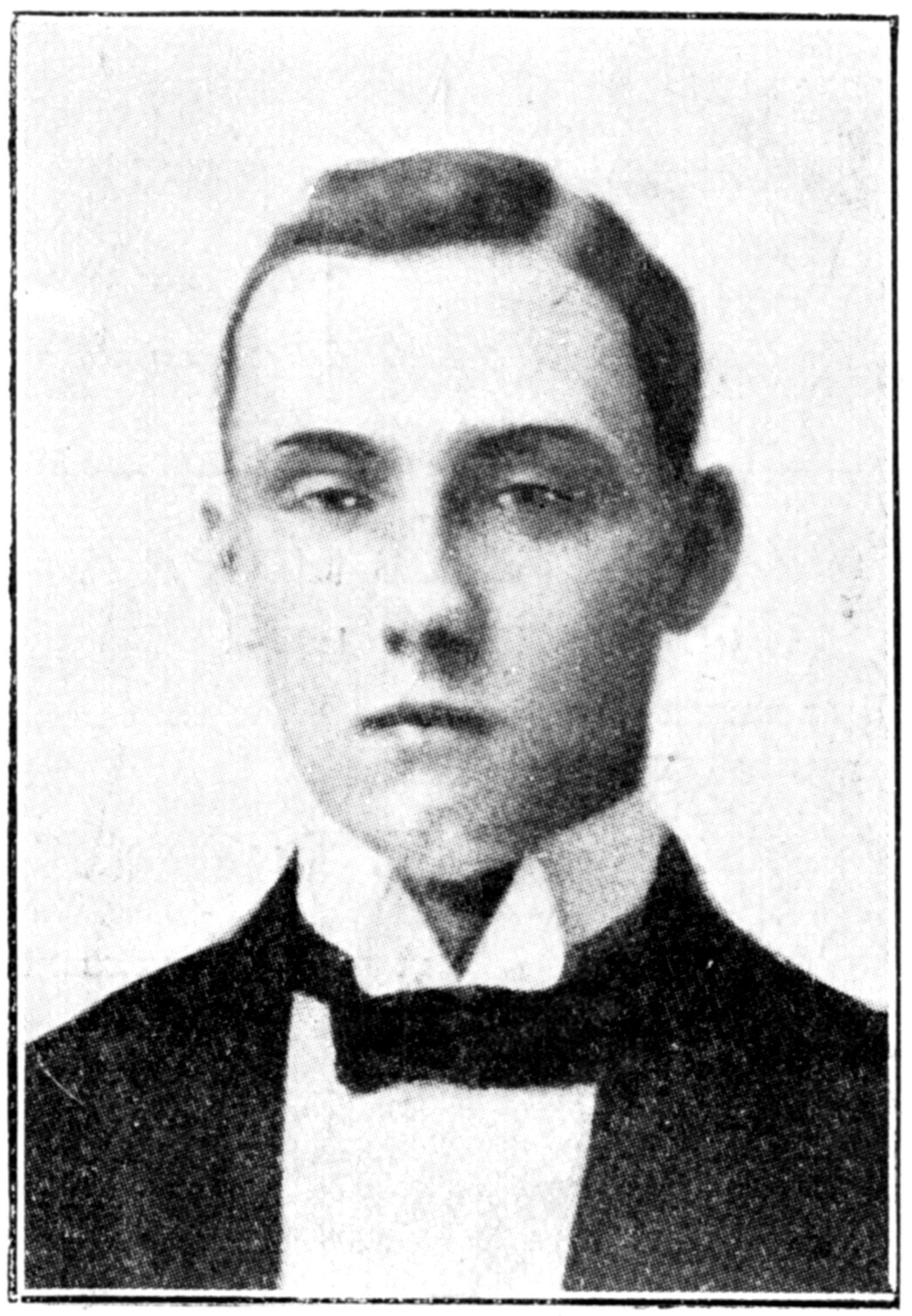
- Franz Joseph in 1914
- Born: 30 August 1891; Heiligendamm, Grand Duchy of Mecklenburg-Schwerin, German Empire
- Died: 3 April 1964 (aged 72); Tübingen, Baden-Württemberg, West Germany
- Spouse: Princess Maria Alix of Saxony (m. 1921)
- Issue: Prince Karl Anton; Prince Meinrad Leopold; Princess Maria Margarethe; Prince Emanuel Joseph
Names
- Franz Joseph Maria Ludwig Anton Thassilo
- House: Hohenzollern-Sigmaringen
- Father: William, Prince of Hohenzollern
- Mother: Princess Maria Teresa of Bourbon-Two Sicilies

Franz Joseph Maria Ludwig Anton Thassilo Prinz von Hohenzollern-Emden (English: Prince Francis Joseph of Hohenzollern-Emden; 30 August 1891 – 3 April 1964) was a member of the Roman Catholic branch of the House of Hohenzollern. He was born as Prince Franz Joseph of Hohenzollern and adopted the surname Prinz von Hohenzollern-Emden in 1933.

== Early life ==
Franz Joseph was born in Heiligendamm in the Grand Duchy of Mecklenburg-Schwerin, the second son of Wilhelm, Prince of Hohenzollern and Princess Maria Teresa of Bourbon-Two Sicilies. He had a twin brother, Prince Friedrich, Prince of Hohenzollern, who was born a few minutes before he was.

== Military service ==
During World War I, Franz Joseph served in Germany's Imperial Navy (Kaiserliche Marine) as the second torpedo officer on the light cruiser SMS Emden at the Battle of Cocos. The SMS Emden had an extraordinary record capturing British ships, and as a result all those who served on her, including Franz Joseph, were given the right to add the ship's name to the end of their surnames. Since Germany had converted titles of nobility into family names in 1919, he became Franz Joseph Prinz von Hohenzollern-Emden.

In 1925, Franz Joseph wrote a book recording his naval service, Emden: Meine Erlebnisse auf S.M Schiff Emden (Leipzig: Eckstein, 1925), translated into English and published as Emden: My Experiences in S.M.S. Emden (reprinted as Emden: The Last Cruise of the Chivalrous Raider, 1914, Brighton: Lyon, 1989, ISBN 0-904256-45-6).

Franz Joseph also had the rank of Konteradmiral in the Romanian Naval Forces.

== Nazi Party membership ==
In 1933, Franz Joseph became a member of the Schutzstaffel (SS) (member number 276 691). On 1 April 1936, he became a full member of the Nazi Party with membership number 3765580. As a leading Roman Catholic nobleman and a near relative of the Habsburg, Bourbon, and Saxon dynasties, Franz Joseph did much to lend respectability to the Nazi Party.

From 1939 to 1944, Franz Joseph commanded a marine flak battery at the Cuxhaven naval base. In June 1944 he was released from active service. In November 1944 he was expelled from the SS together with other upper class Nazis whose devotion was becoming suspect in the face of Germany's, by then, near-certain defeat. In a letter to Heinrich Himmler dated 3 January 1945, Franz Joseph proclaimed his continued devotion to the Nazi cause and unsuccessfully begged to be readmitted to the SS.

== Marriage and family ==
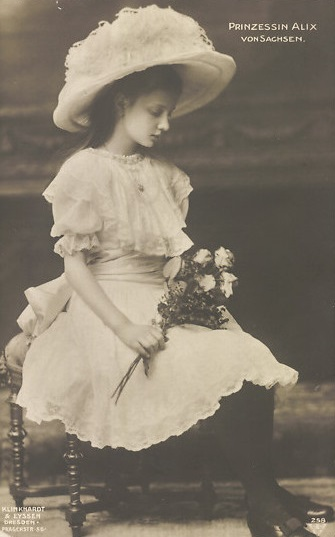
Princess Maria Alix of Saxony in the 1910s.

On 25 May 1921, Franz Joseph married his second cousin Princess Maria Alix of Saxony (1901–1990), daughter of King Friedrich August III of Saxony and Archduchess Luise, Princess of Tuscany. His twin brother was married to Maria Alix's sister, Princess Margarete Karola of Saxony (1900–1962).

They had four children:

1. Karl Anton Friedrich Wilhelm Ludwig Maria Georg Manuel Rupprecht Heinrich Benedikt Tassilo Prinz von Hohenzollern-Emden; born on 28 January 1922 in Munich, Bavaria, Germany; died on 3 November 1993 in Hechingen, Baden-Württemberg, Germany; married in Rome, Italy, on 15 August 1951 to Alexandra Afif (16 November 1919 - 26 June 1996)
2. Meinrad Leopold Maria Friedrich Christian Ferdinand Albert Prinz von Hohenzollern-Emden; born on 17 January 1925 in Sigmaringen, Baden-Württemberg, Germany; died on 9 September 2009 in Murnau Hechendorf, Germany; married (civil) in Frankfurt, Germany on 25 August 1971 and (religious) in Sigmaringen on 11 September 1971 to Edina Freijn von Kap-Herr (born 23 August 1938)
3. Maria Margarethe Anna Viktoria Luise Josephine Mathilde Theresia vom Kinde Jesu Prinzessin von Hohenzollern-Emden; born on 2 January 1928 in Sigmaringen, Baden-Württemberg, Germany; died on 4 August 2006 in Hechingen, Baden-Württemberg, Germany; married (civil) in Hechingen 18 December 1965 and (religious) at Burg Hohenzollern, Hechingen on 18 December 1965 to Duke Carl Gregor of Mecklenburg, second son of George, Duke of Mecklenburg head of the House of House of Mecklenburg-Strelitz
4. Emanuel Joseph Maria Wilhelm Ferdinand Burkhard Prinz von Hohenzollern-Emden; born in Munich, Bavaria, Germany on 23 February 1929; died in Hechingen, Baden-Württemberg, Germany on 8 February 1999; married (civil and religious) at Burg Hohenzollern on 25 May 1968 to Katharina Feodora Adelheid Sabine Sophie Felicitas Sieglinde, Princess of Saxe-Weimar-Eisenach (born 30 November 1943), granddaughter of William Ernest, the last Grand Duke of Saxe-Weimar-Eisenach; divorced in 1985

Franz Joseph lived with his family at Villa Eugenia in Hechingen.

Franz Joseph died on 3 April 1964 at Tübingen, Baden-Württemberg. He and his wife are buried in the Erlöserkirche in Sigmaringen.

== Ancestry ==
Ancestors of Franz Joseph, Prince of Hohenzollern-Emden

8. Karl Anton, Prince of Hohenzollern
4. Leopold, Prince of Hohenzollern
9. Princess Josephine of Baden
2. William, Prince of Hohenzollern
10. Ferdinand II of Portugal
5. Infanta Antónia of Portugal
11. Maria II of Portugal
1. Franz Joseph, Prince of Hohenzollern-Emden
12. Ferdinand II of the Two Sicilies
6. Prince Louis, Count of Trani
13. Archduchess Maria Theresa of Austria
3. Princess Maria Teresa of Bourbon-Two Sicilies
14. Duke Maximilian Joseph in Bavaria
7. Duchess Mathilde Ludovika in Bavaria
15. Princess Ludovika of Bavaria
