= Augusta Victoria of Hohenzollern =

Titular queen of Portugal

- Queen consort of Portugal (titular)
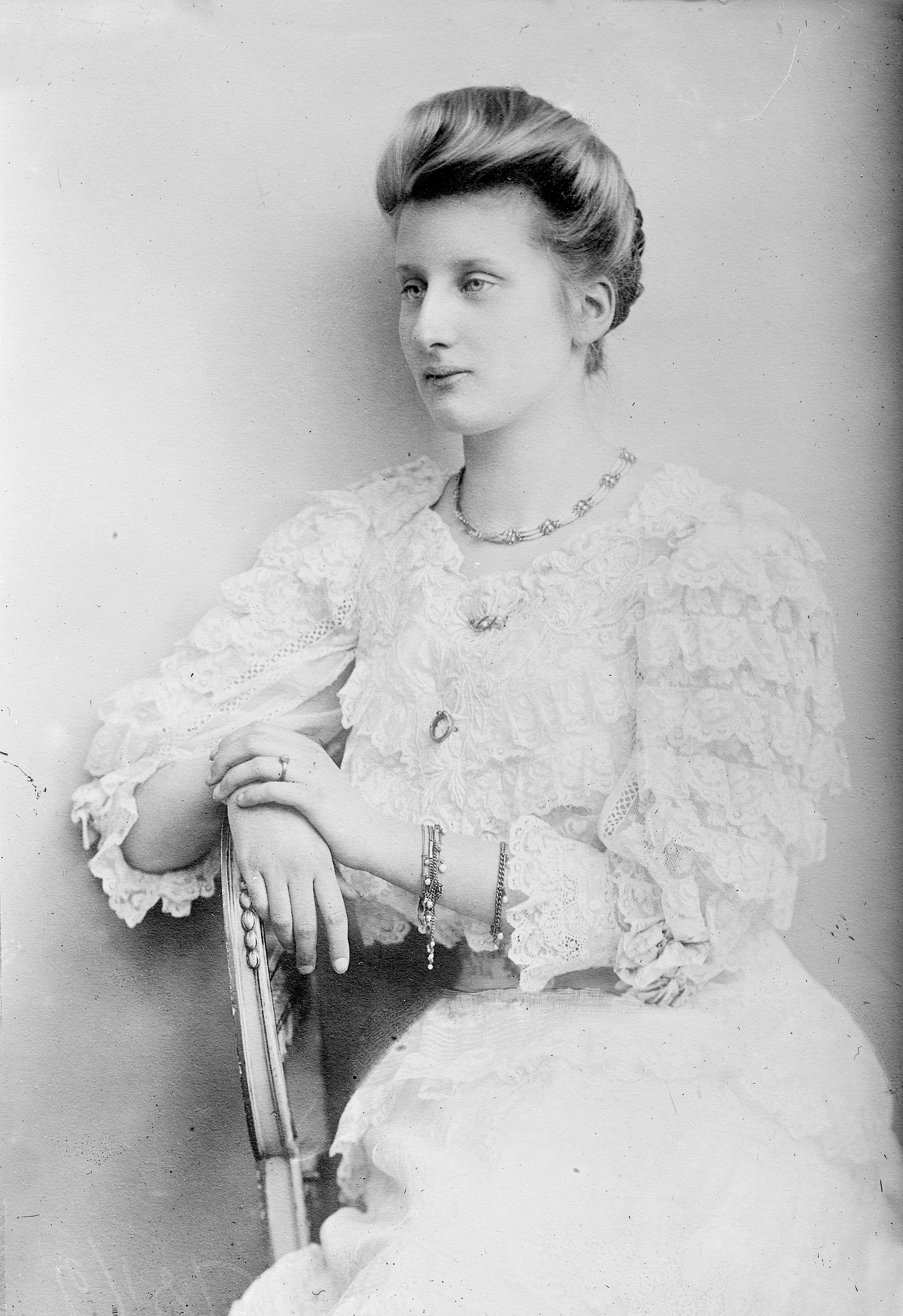
- Photograph, c. 1913
- Born: 19 August 1890; Potsdam, German Empire
- Died: 29 August 1966 (aged 76); Eigeltingen, Baden-Württemberg, West Germany
- Burial: Langenstein Castle, Germany
- Spouses: Manuel II of Portugal (m. 1913; died 1932) Count Robert Douglas, 13th Count of Skenninge and Stjernorp (m. 1939; died 1955)
Names
- German: Auguste Viktoria Wilhelmine Antonie Mathilde Ludovika Josephine Maria Elisabeth
- House: Hohenzollern-Sigmaringen
- Father: William, Prince of Hohenzollern
- Mother: Princess Maria Teresa of Bourbon-Two Sicilies

Augusta Victoria of Hohenzollern (German: Auguste Viktoria Wilhelmine Antonie Mathilde Ludovika Josephine Maria Elisabeth; 19 August 1890 – 29 August 1966) was the only daughter of William, Prince of Hohenzollern, and Princess Maria Teresa of Bourbon-Two Sicilies. In 1913, she married the deposed King Manuel II of Portugal. After his death, Augusta Victoria married a second time. She had no children from either marriage.

== Family ==
She was born in Potsdam, a daughter of William, Prince of Hohenzollern, sometime heir presumptive to the throne of the Kingdom of Romania and his first wife Princess Maria Teresa of Bourbon-Two Sicilies, niece of Empress Sisi.

== First marriage ==
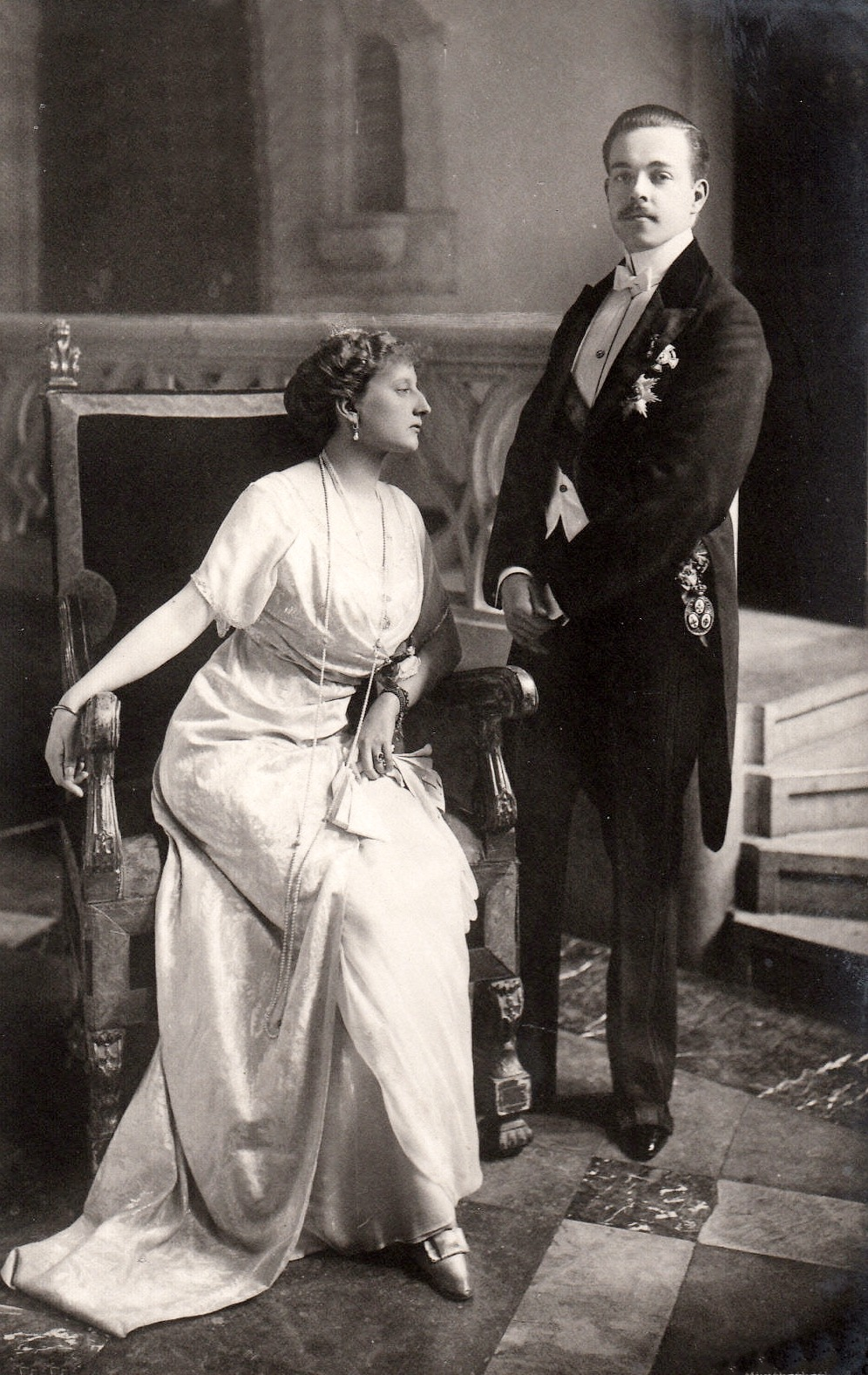
Augusta Victoria with her first husband, Manuel II of Portugal

On 4 September 1913, at Sigmaringen Castle, Augusta Victoria married King Manuel II of Portugal. He had succeeded to the Portuguese throne with the assassination of his father, Carlos I of Portugal, and older brother, Luís Filipe, Duke of Braganza, on 1 February 1908. He had been deposed by the 5 October 1910 revolution, resulting in the establishment of the Portuguese First Republic. The bride was twenty-three years-old and the groom twenty-four. They were second cousins, both being great-grandchildren of Queen Maria II of Portugal and King Ferdinand II of Portugal. Manuel died on 2 July 1932, at Fulwell Park, Twickenham, Middlesex, England. There were no children from this marriage.

== Second marriage ==
On 23 April 1939, Augusta Victoria married again. Her second husband, Count Robert Douglas von Langenstein, was the 13th head of the Swedish comital house of Douglas, lord of Langenstein Castle in Baden, and heir of the Mühlhausen fideicommiss/entail (the eldest son of Count Ludvig Douglas). They were also related, being third cousins twice removed, both descending from Charles Frederick, Grand Duke of Baden. The bride was almost 49 years old and the groom 59. There were no children from this marriage either. Douglas died on 26 August 1955. Augusta died at Eigeltingen, Baden-Württemberg, Germany, 10 days after her birthday at the age of 76.

== Ancestry ==
Ancestors of Augusta Victoria of Hohenzollern

8. Karl Anton, Prince of Hohenzollern
4. Leopold, Prince of Hohenzollern
9. Princess Josephine of Baden
2. William, Prince of Hohenzollern
10. Ferdinand II of Portugal
5. Infanta Antónia of Portugal
11. Maria II of Portugal
1. Princess Augusta Victoria of Hohenzollern
12. Ferdinand II of the Two Sicilies
6. Prince Louis, Count of Trani
13. Archduchess Maria Theresa of Austria
3. Princess Maria Teresa of Bourbon-Two Sicilies
14. Duke Maximilian Joseph in Bavaria
7. Duchess Mathilde in Bavaria
15. Princess Ludovika of Bavaria

== Sources ==
- Kenny, Peter Francis (2016). Monarchs. Xlibris. ISBN 978-1514443767.
- McNaughton, C. Arnold. The Book of Kings: A Royal Genealogy
- Van der Kiste, John (2003). Crowns in a Changing World: The British and European Monarchies, 1901-36. The History Press. ISBN 978-0750934312.

Augusta Victoria of Hohenzollern House of Hohenzollern-Sigmaringen Cadet branch of the House of Hohenzollern Born: 19 August 1890 Died: 29 August 1966
Titles in pretence
Preceded by Amélie of Orléans	— TITULAR — Queen consort of Portugal and Algarves; 4 September 1913 – 2 July 1932; Reason for succession failure: Republic declared	Succeeded by Maria Francisca of Orléans-Braganza
