= Princess Maria Theresa of Bourbon-Two Sicilies =

Maria Teresa of Bourbon-Two Sicilies
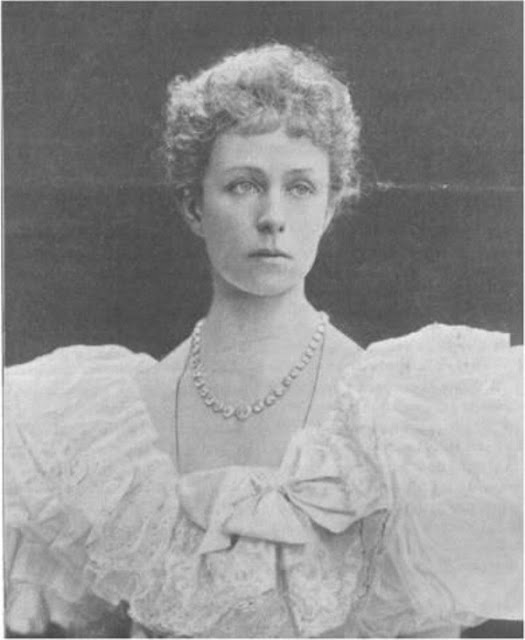
- Maria Theresa c. 1897

Princess consort of Hohenzollern
- Born: 15 January 1867; Zürich, Switzerland
- Died: 1 March 1909 (aged 42); Cannes, France
- Spouse: William, Prince of Hohenzollern (m. 1889)
- Issue: Augusta Victoria, Queen of Portugal; Frederick, Prince of Hohenzollern; Francis Joseph, Prince of Hohenzollern-Emden
Names
- Italian: Maria Teresa Maddalena; German: Maria Theresia Magdalena
- House: Bourbon
- Father: Prince Louis, Count of Trani
- Mother: Duchess Mathilde Ludovika in Bavaria

Maria Teresa of Bourbon-Two Sicilies (Full Italian name: Principessa Maria Teresa Maddalena di Borbone delle Due Sicilie) (15 January 1867, Zürich, Switzerland – 1 March 1909, Cannes, France) was the only child of Prince Louis of Bourbon-Two Sicilies, Count of Trani (heir apparent of the defunct throne of the Two Sicilies) and his wife Duchess Mathilde Ludovika in Bavaria. Maria Teresa was a member of the House of Bourbon-Two Sicilies and became a member of the House of Hohenzollern-Sigmaringen and titular princess of Hohenzollern through her marriage to Prince Wilhelm of Hohenzollern (later Prince of Hohenzollern). She was called Mädi in the family and had a lifelong friendship with her cousin Archduchess Marie Valerie of Austria.

== Marriage and issue ==
Maria Teresa married Prince Wilhelm of Hohenzollern, eldest son of Leopold, Prince of Hohenzollern and Infanta Antónia of Portugal, on 27 June 1889 in Sigmaringen. Maria Teresa and Wilhelm had three children:

- Augusta Victoria of Hohenzollern (19 August 1890 – 29 August 1966). Married first Manuel II of Portugal and secondly Robert, Count Douglas.
- Prince Frederick Victor of Hohenzollern (30 August 1891 – 6 February 1965). Married Princess Margarete Karola of Saxony. She was a daughter of Frederick Augustus III of Saxony and Archduchess Luise, Princess of Tuscany.
- Prince Francis Joseph of Hohenzollern adopted the title Prince of Hohenzollern-Emden (30 August 1891 – 3 April 1964). He married Princess Maria Alix of Saxony, also a daughter of Frederick Augustus III of Saxony and Archduchess Luise, Princess of Tuscany.

== Later life ==
Maria Teresa's husband succeeded his father as Prince of Hohenzollern on 8 June 1905. For many years, Maria Teresa had poor health. As the climate in Sigmaringen was not suitable for her constitution, she lived mostly in Bad Tölz (in the summers) and Cannes (in the winters), and was treated to regular visits from her family. It was in Cannes that she died, most likely of multiple sclerosis, on 1 March 1909 after almost four years as Princess of Hohenzollern.

According to her sister-in-law, the Queen of Romania, "Somehow, Mädi could not fit in with the Hohenzollern family; she seemed to actually take pleasure in shocking them whenever she could.and was extremely thin, with pale blue eyes and a pathetic voice. Her health was not robust and she was quite an invalid, wheeled about in a chair, before she died at the age of 42… she saw very little of her children to whom she was a mother in name more than fact… Madi's one great love was her mother, Countess Trani, sister of Empress Elisabeth of Austria [...] poor Mädi [...] seldom crossed my path."

=== Honours ===
- Kingdom of Prussia: Dame of the Order of Louise, 1st Class
- Austria-Hungary:
  - Grand Cordon of the Order of Elizabeth
  - Dame of the Starry Cross, 1st Class
- Kingdom of Portugal: Dame of the Order of Queen Saint Isabel

== Ancestry ==
Ancestors of Princess Maria Theresa of Bourbon-Two Sicilies

8. Francis I of the Two Sicilies
4. Ferdinand II of the Two Sicilies
9. Infanta Maria Isabella of Spain
2. Prince Louis, Count of Trani
10. Archduke Charles, Duke of Teschen
5. Archduchess Maria Theresa of Austria
11. Princess Henrietta of Nassau-Weilburg
1. Princess Maria Teresa of Bourbon-Two Sicilies
12. Duke Pius August in Bavaria
6. Duke Maximilian Joseph in Bavaria
13. Princess Amélie Louise of Arenberg
3. Duchess Mathilde Ludovika in Bavaria
14. Maximilian I Joseph of Bavaria
7. Princess Ludovika of Bavaria
15. Princess Caroline of Baden

Princess Maria Theresa of Bourbon-Two Sicilies House of Bourbon-Two Sicilies Cadet branch of the House of Bourbon Born: 15 January 1867 Died: 1 March 1909
Titles in pretence
Preceded by Infanta Antónia of Portugal	— TITULAR — Princess of Hohenzollern; Princess of Hohenzollern-Sigmaringen; Princess of Hohenzollern-Hechingen; Countess of Hohenzollern-Haigerloch; 8 June 1905 – 1 March 1909; Reason for succession failure: Principality annexed by the Kingdom of Prussia in 1850	Succeeded by Princess Adelgunde of Bavaria
