= William, Prince of Hohenzollern =

German prince (1864–1927)

William
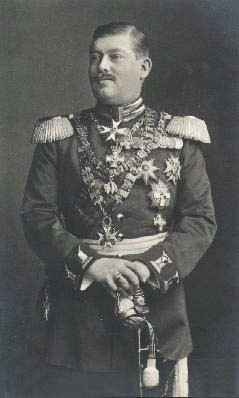
- William in 1905

Prince of Hohenzollern
- Tenure: 8 June 1905 – 22 October 1927
- Predecessor: Leopold
- Successor: Frederick
- Born: 7 March 1864; Schloss Benrath, near Düsseldorf, Rhine Province, Prussia
- Died: 22 October 1927 (aged 63); Sigmaringen, Province of Hohenzollern, German Reich
- Spouse: Princess Maria Teresa of Bourbon-Two Sicilies (m. 1889; died 1909) Princess Adelgunde of Bavaria (m. 1915)
- Issue: Princess Augusta Victoria, titular Queen of Portugal; Frederick, Prince of Hohenzollern; Francis Joseph, Prince of Hohenzollern-Emden
Names
- German: Wilhelm August Karl Joseph Peter Ferdinand Benedikt
- House: Hohenzollern
- Father: Leopold, Prince of Hohenzollern
- Mother: Infanta Antónia of Portugal

William, Prince of Hohenzollern (German: Wilhelm August Karl Joseph Peter Ferdinand Benedikt Fürst von Hohenzollern) (7 March 1864 – 22 October 1927) was the eldest son of Leopold, Prince of Hohenzollern, and Infanta Antónia of Portugal.

William was an older brother of Ferdinand of Romania. His first cousins included (among others) Carlos I of Portugal, Albert I of Belgium, Frederick Augustus III of Saxony, and Princess Maria Josepha of Saxony.

Between 1880 and 1886, William was heir presumptive to the Romanian throne. On 20 December 1886, he renounced his rights to the throne in favour of his brother Ferdinand.

== Family ==
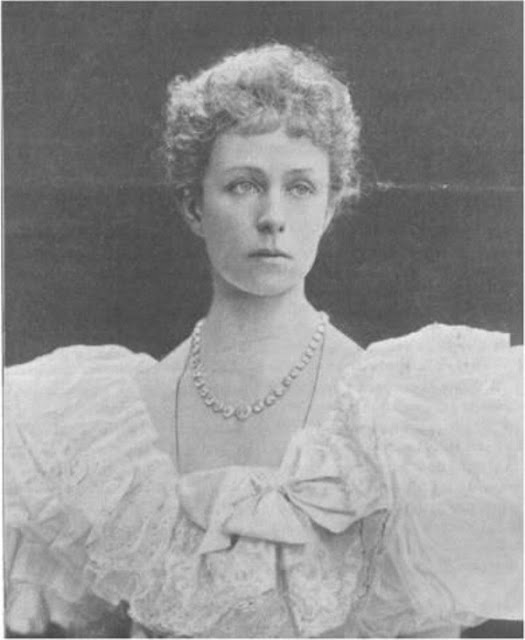
William's first wife Maria Theresa

William and his second wife Adelgunde, 1916

On 27 June 1889, William married Princess Maria Teresa of Bourbon-Two Sicilies. Her parents were Prince Louis, Count of Trani and Mathilde Ludovika, Duchess in Bavaria. Louis was the eldest son of Ferdinand II of the Two Sicilies and his second wife Archduchess Maria Theresa of Austria. Mathilde was the fourth daughter of Maximilian, Duke in Bavaria and Princess Ludovika of Bavaria. William and Maria Teresa had three children:

- Augusta Victoria of Hohenzollern (19 August 1890 – 29 August 1966). Married first Manuel II of Portugal and secondly Robert, Count Douglas.
- Prince Frederick Victor of Hohenzollern (30 August 1891 – 6 February 1965). Married Princess Margarete Karola of Saxony. She was a daughter of Frederick Augustus III of Saxony and Archduchess Luise, Princess of Tuscany.
- Prince Francis Joseph of Hohenzollern, adopted the title Prince of Hohenzollern-Emden (30 August 1891 – 3 April 1964). He married Princess Maria Alix of Saxony, also a daughter of Frederick Augustus III of Saxony and Archduchess Luise, Princess of Tuscany.

William succeeded his father as Prince of Hohenzollern on 8 June 1905. Maria Teresa died on 1 May 1909.

On 20 January 1915, Wilhelm married secondly Princess Adelgunde of Bavaria. She was a daughter of Ludwig III of Bavaria and Maria Theresia of Austria-Este. There were no children from this marriage.

William's title was effectively abolished with the collapse of the German Empire. He continued to use his princely surname, which was permitted by the constitution.

== Romanian succession ==
On 22 November 1880, William's father, Prince Leopold, renounced his rights to the succession of the principality of Romania in favour of his sons.

Having become familiar with the situation there, the 22-year-old William renounced all rights to the succession of the kingdom (since 1881) of Romania by a letter in French dated on 20 December 1886.

In 1914, upon the death of King Carol I of Romania, William's next brother Ferdinand became king.

== Honours and awards ==
German orders and decorations

- Hohenzollern-Sigmaringen: Cross of Honour of the Princely House Order of Hohenzollern, 1st Class with Swords
- Prussia:
  - Knight of the Black Eagle, with Collar
  - Grand Cross of the Red Eagle
  - Grand Commander of the Royal House Order of Hohenzollern
  - Iron Cross (1914), 1st Class
  - Military Honor Medal
  - Red Cross Medal, 1st Class
- (Duchy of Anhalt) Anhalt:
  - Grand Cross of Albert the Bear, 1887
  - Friedrich Cross
- Baden:
  - Knight of the House Order of Fidelity, 1884
  - Knight of the Order of Berthold the First, with Golden Collar, 1884
  - Grand Cross of the Military Karl-Friedrich Merit Order
- Bavaria:
  - Knight of St. Hubert, 1905
  - Grand Cross of the Military Merit Order, with Swords
- Brunswick:
  - Grand Cross of Henry the Lion
  - War Service Cross
- (Saxe-Coburg and Gotha) (Duchy of Saxe-Altenburg) (Saxe-Meiningen) Ernestine duchies:
  - Grand Cross of the Saxe-Ernestine House Order, 1887; with Swords, 1914
  - Duke Ernst Medal with Crown (Altenburg)
  - Cross for Merit in War (Meiningen)
- (Grand Duchy of Hesse) Hesse and by Rhine:
  - Grand Cross of the Ludwig Order, 12 July 1906
  - Medal of Bravery
- Mecklenburg:
  - Grand Cross of the Wendish Crown, with Crown in Ore
  - Gold Military Merit Cross (Schwerin)
  - Cross for Distinction in War, 1st Class (Strelitz)
- Oldenburg: Grand Cross of the Order of Duke Peter Friedrich Ludwig, with Golden Collar and Crown
- Saxe-Weimar-Eisenach: Grand Cross of the White Falcon
- Saxony: Knight of the Rue Crown
- Württemberg: Grand Cross of the Württemberg Crown, 1906; with Swords

Foreign orders and decorations

- Kingdom of Romania:
  - Collar of the Order of Carol I
  - Grand Cross of the Star of Romania
  - Grand Cross of the Crown of Romania
  - Decoration of Bene Merenti of the Royal House
- Austria-Hungary:
  - Grand Cross of the Imperial Order of Leopold, 1900
  - Grand Cross of St. Stephen, 1905
  - Knight of the Golden Fleece, 1907
- Belgium: Grand Cordon of the Order of Leopold
- Principality of Bulgaria: Grand Cross of St. Alexander
- Kingdom of Greece: Grand Cross of the Redeemer
- Kingdom of Italy: Knight of the Annunciation, 28 October 1913
  - (Kingdom of the Two Sicilies) Two Sicilian Royal Family: Grand Cross of St. Ferdinand and Merit
- Holy See: Grand Cross of the Holy Sepulchre of Jerusalem
- Sovereign Military Order of Malta: Grand Cross of Honour and Devotion
- Ottoman Empire: Order of the Medjidie, 1st Class
- Kingdom of Portugal:
  - Grand Cross of the Sash of the Two Orders
  - Grand Cross of the Tower and Sword, with Collar
- Russian Empire: Knight of St. Andrew
- Spain:
  - Grand Cross of the Order of Charles III, with Collar, 1907
  - Grand Cross of Military Merit
- French Tunisia: Grand Cordon of the Order of Glory

William, Prince of Hohenzollern House of Hohenzollern Cadet branch of the House of Hohenzollern Born: 7 March 1864 Died: 22 October 1927
German nobility
Preceded by Leopold	Prince of Hohenzollern; 8 June 1905 – 22 October 1927	Succeeded by Frederick
