= Princess Adelgunde of Bavaria =

Princess Adelgunde of Bavaria may refer to:

- Princess Adelgunde of Bavaria, Duchess of Modena (1823–1914)
- Princess Adelgunde of Bavaria, Princess of Hohenzollern (1870–1958)
