= Queen Augusta (disambiguation) =

Queen Augusta may refer to:

- Augusta of Saxe-Weimar-Eisenach (1811–1890), Queen consort of Prussia
- Augusta Victoria of Schleswig-Holstein (1858–1921), Queen consort of Prussia
- Augusta Victoria of Hohenzollern (1890–1966), titular Queen consort of Portugal
