= Ferdinand I of Romania =

King of Romania from 1914 to 1927

Ferdinand I
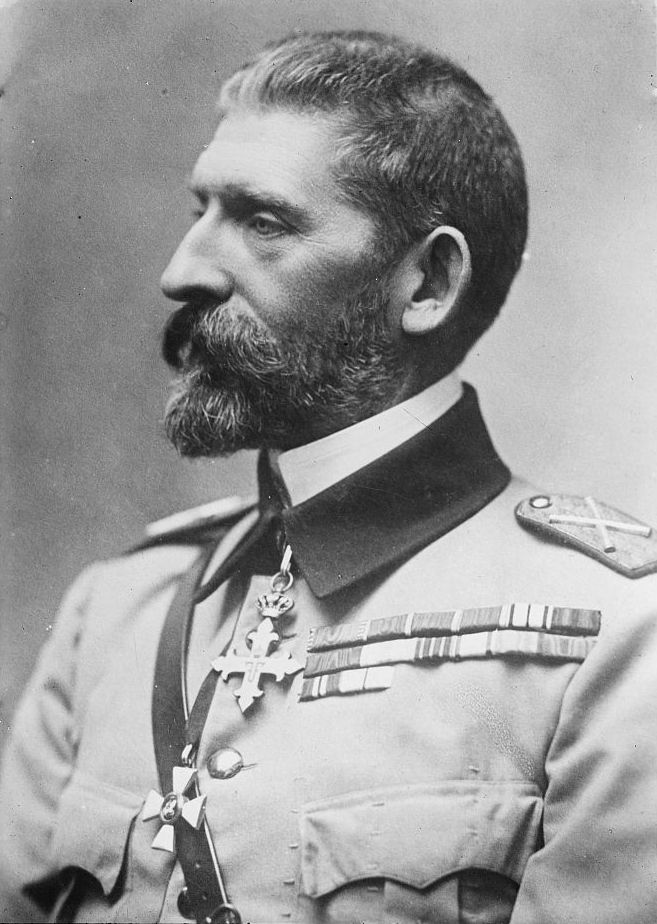
- Ferdinand I as Marshal, c. 1920

King of Romania
- Reign: 10 October 1914 – 20 July 1927
- Coronation: 15 October 1922
- Predecessor: Carol I
- Successor: Michael I
- Born: 24 August 1865; Sigmaringen Castle, Sigmaringen, German Confederation
- Died: 20 July 1927 (aged 61); Peleș Castle, Sinaia, Kingdom of Romania
- Burial: Curtea de Argeș, Romania
- Spouse: Marie of Edinburgh (m. 1893)
- Issue: Carol II, King of Romania; Elisabeth, Queen of the Hellenes; Maria, Queen of Yugoslavia; Nicholas, Prince Regent of Romania; Princess Ileana of Romania; Prince Mircea of Romania
Names
- Ferdinand Viktor Albert Meinrad
- House: Hohenzollern-Sigmaringen
- Father: Leopold, Prince of Hohenzollern
- Mother: Infanta Antónia of Portugal

Ferdinand I (Romanian pronunciation: [fer.diˈnand ɨnˈtɨj]; Ferdinand Viktor Albert Meinrad; 24 August 1865 – 20 July 1927), nicknamed the Unifier (Întregitorul [ɨn.tre.d͡ʒiˈto.rul]), was King of Romania from 10 October 1914 until his death in 1927. Ferdinand was the second son of Leopold, Prince of Hohenzollern, and Infanta Antónia of Portugal (the daughter of Queen Maria II of Portugal and Prince Ferdinand of Saxe-Coburg and Gotha-Kohary). His family was part of the Swabian Catholic branch of the Prussian royal House of Hohenzollern.

In 1886, Ferdinand became heir presumptive to the Romanian throne, following the renunciation of his father (in 1880) and older brother. From the moment he settled in Romania, he continued his military career, gaining a series of honorary commands and being promoted to the rank of corps general. He married in 1893 Princess Marie of Edinburgh, granddaughter of both Queen Victoria and Emperor Alexander II.

Ferdinand became King of Romania on 10 October 1914, under the name Ferdinand I, following the death of his uncle, King Carol I. He ruled Romania during World War I, choosing to side with the Triple Entente against the Central Powers. This led to Kaiser Wilhelm II of Germany removing his name from the royal house of Hohenzollern. At the war's end, Romania emerged as a much-enlarged kingdom due to Bessarabia, Bukovina and Transylvania and parts of Banat, Crișana, and Maramureș becoming part of the Kingdom of Romania in 1920, and Ferdinand was crowned king of "Greater Romania" in a grand ceremony in 1922. In the years following the establishment of Greater Romania, Romanian society went through a series of major transformations, especially to the application of the agrarian reform and of the universal vote. In 1925, his eldest son, Prince Carol, gave up the rights of succession to the royal crown of Romania leading to a dynastic crisis, as the next prince in line of succession was Carol's 4-year-old son, Prince Michael. This led Ferdinand to remove Prince Carol's name from the royal house of Romania.

Ferdinand died from cancer in 1927 and was succeeded by his grandson Michael under a regency formed by three people: Prince Nicholas of Romania, the younger brother of Prince Carol; patriarch Miron Cristea; and president of the Supreme Court of Justice Gheorghe Buzdugan.

== Early life ==
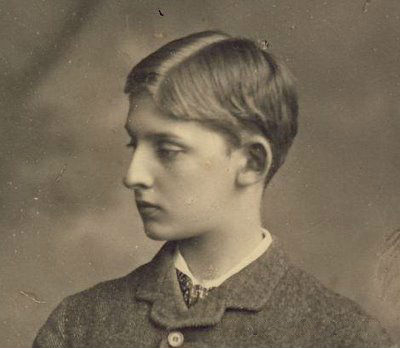
Ferdinand as a teenager, 1878

Prince Ferdinand Viktor Albert Meinrad of Hohenzollern-Sigmaringen was born in Sigmaringen in southwestern Germany. The name was later shortened simply to Hohenzollern after the extinction of the Hohenzollern-Hechingen branch in 1869. The princes of Hohenzollern-Sigmaringen had ruled the principality until 1850, when it was annexed to Prussia.

Ferdinand I was the son of Leopold, Prince of Hohenzollern-Sigmaringen, and his wife, Infanta Antónia of Portugal (1845–1913), daughter of Queen Maria II of Portugal and Prince Ferdinand of Saxe-Coburg and Gotha, heir to the Hungarian magnates of Koháry on his mother's side. He pursued higher studies in Germany, attending the University of Leipzig and the School of Political Science and Economics at the University of Tübingen, graduating from Leipzig in 1889.

Following the renunciations, first of his father in 1880 and then of his elder brother Prince Wilhelm of Hohenzollern-Sigmaringen in 1886, young Ferdinand became the heir-presumptive to the throne of his childless uncle, King Carol I of Romania, who reigned until his death in October 1914. In 1889, the Romanian parliament recognized Ferdinand as a prince of Romania. The Romanian government did not require his conversion to Eastern Orthodoxy from Catholicism, as was the common practice prior to this date, thus allowing him to continue with his born creed, but it was required that his children be raised Orthodox, the state religion of Romania. For agreeing to this, Ferdinand was excommunicated from the Catholic Church, although this was later lifted.

Ferdinand's mother's first cousin Tsar Ferdinand I of Bulgaria sat on the throne of the neighbouring Bulgaria beginning in 1887, and was to become the greatest opponent of the kingdom of his Romanian cousins. The neighboring Emperor Francis Joseph, monarch of Austria-Hungary and as such, ruler of Transylvania, was Ferdinand's grandmother's first cousin.

Ferdinand, a complete stranger in his new home, started to get close to one of Queen Elisabeth's ladies in waiting, Elena Văcărescu. Elisabeth, the Queen consort of Romania, very close to Elena herself, encouraged the romance.

The affair caused a sort of dynastic crisis in 1891. The result of this was the exile of both Elisabeth (in Neuwied) and Elena (in Paris), as well as a trip by Ferdinand through Europe in search of a suitable bride, whom he eventually found in Queen Victoria's granddaughter, Princess Marie of Edinburgh.

== Marriage ==
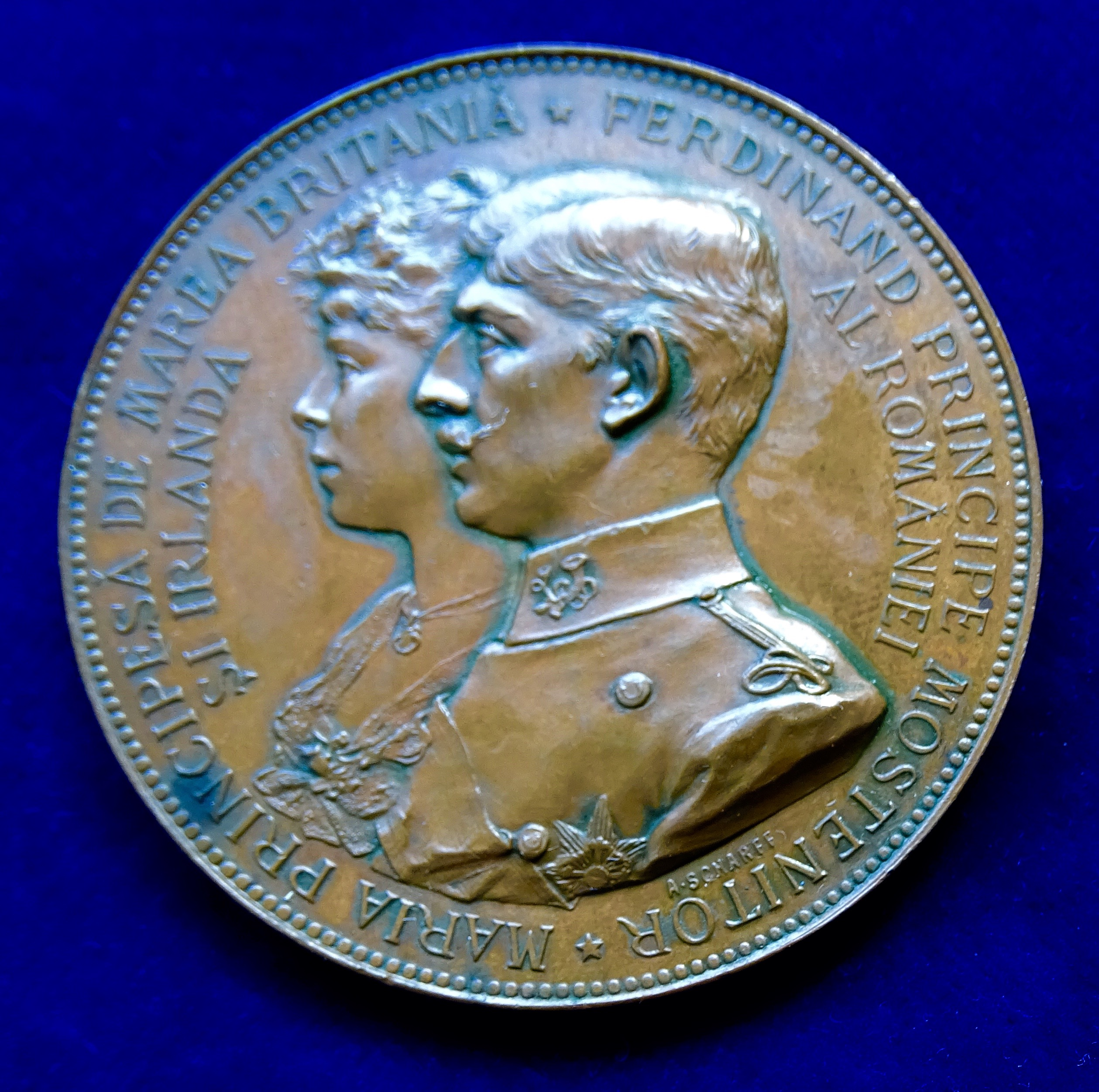
Wedding Medal of Ferdinand I of Romania 1893 by Anton Scharff. Obverse

In Sigmaringen on 10 January 1893, the Catholic Prince Ferdinand of Romania married his distant cousin, the Lutheran Princess Marie of Edinburgh, daughter of the Anglican Prince Alfred, Duke of Edinburgh, and the Orthodox Grand Duchess Marie Alexandrovna of Russia. Marie and Ferdinand were third cousins in descent from Franz Frederick Anton, Duke of Saxe-Coburg-Saalfeld. Marie's paternal grandparents were Victoria of the United Kingdom and Prince Albert of Saxe-Coburg and Gotha; her maternal grandparents were Alexander II of Russia and Marie of Hesse and by Rhine. The reigning emperor of neighbouring Russia at the time of the marriage was Marie's uncle, Tsar Alexander III, who would be succeeded by his eldest son and Marie's first cousin, Tsar Nicholas II, the following year.

The royal Romanian marriage produced three sons (Carol, Nicholas, and Mircea – the last of whom dying in infancy) and three daughters (Elisabeta, Maria – called "Mignon" – and Ileana), but it was unhappy. Indeed, the couple's two youngest children, Ileana and Mircea, are widely believed to have been sired by Marie's long-time lover, Barbu Știrbey.

== King of Romania ==
On 10 October 1914, Ferdinand's uncle, Carol I, died without surviving issue. Ferdinand succeeded him as King of Romania, reigning until his own death on 20 July 1927.

=== World War I ===
Though a member of a cadet branch of Germany's ruling Hohenzollern imperial family, Ferdinand presided over his country's entry into World War I on the side of the Triple Entente against the Central Powers, on 27 August 1916. Thus he gained the sobriquet "the Loyal", having kept the oath he swore before the Parliament of Romania in 1914: "I will reign as a good Romanian."

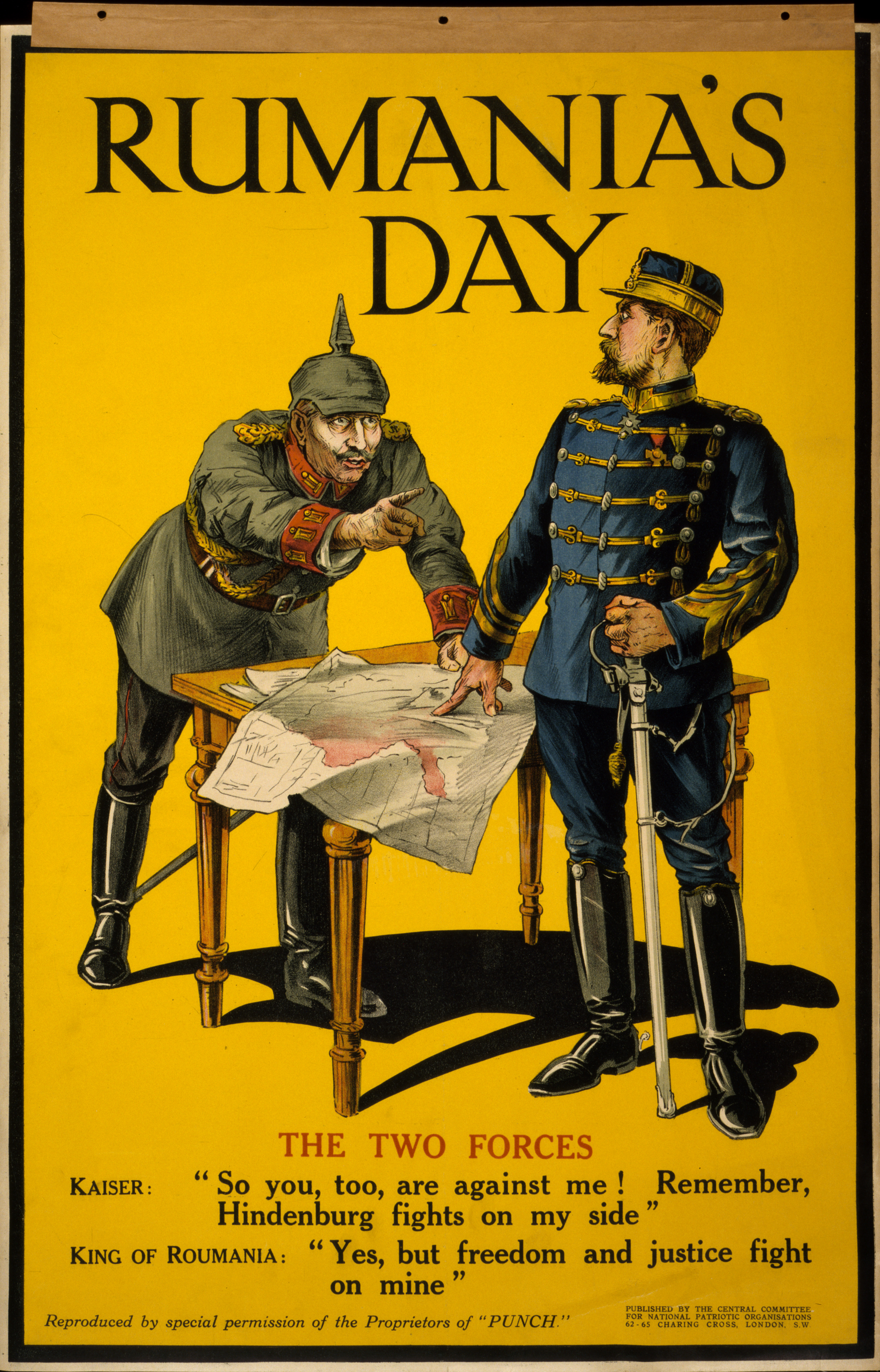
Wilhelm and Ferdinand (British World War I poster)

As a consequence of this "betrayal" of his German origin, German Emperor Wilhelm II had Ferdinand's name erased from the Hohenzollern House register.

Despite the setbacks after the entry into war, when Dobruja and Wallachia were occupied by the Central Powers, Romania fought in 1917 and stopped the German advance into Moldavia. When the new Bolshevik government of Russia sued for peace in 1918, Romania was surrounded by the Central Powers and forced to conclude a peace treaty of its own; however, Ferdinand refused to sign and ratify the Treaty of Bucharest. Allied forces then advanced on the Thessaloniki front and they knocked Bulgaria out of the war. Ferdinand ordered the re-mobilization of the Romanian Army, and Romania re-entered the war on the side of the Triple Entente.

=== After the war ===
The outcome of Romania's war effort was the union of Bessarabia, Bukovina, and Transylvania with the Kingdom of Romania in 1918. Ferdinand became the ruler of a greatly enlarged Romanian state in 1918–1920 following the victory of the Entente over the Central Powers, a war between the Kingdom of Romania and the new Hungarian Soviet Republic, and the Russian Civil War. He was crowned king of "Greater Romania" in a spectacular ceremony on 15 October 1922 in the courtyard of the newly consecrated "Coronation Cathedral" in the historic princely seat of Alba Iulia in Transylvania.

A new period of Romanian history began on the day of the Union of Transylvania with Romania (Great Union Day, Marea Unire). This period would come to an end with international treaties, in the years leading to World War II, which ceded parts of Romania to its neighbors. As such, they are widely seen as an attempt to provoke the country into taking sides and joining the war.

Domestic political life during his reign was dominated by the conservative National Liberal Party, which was led by the brothers Ion and Vintilă Brătianu. The acquisition of Transylvania had the unintended effect of enlarging the electoral base of the opposition, whose principal parties united in January 1925 – October 1926 to form the National Peasant Party.

== Death ==
Ferdinand died from colon cancer in Sinaia on 20 July 1927 at the age of 61. He was succeeded by his grandson Michael under a regency (King Michael's father having renounced his rights to the throne in December 1925). The regency had three members, one of whom was Ferdinand's second son, Prince Nicholas.

== Arms and honours ==
Coat of Arms of Ferdinand I as King (1914–1922)	Coat of Arms of Ferdinand I as King (1922–1927)	Standard of Ferdinand I as King (1914–1922)	Standard of Ferdinand I as King (1922–1927)

He received the following honours:

- Romania:
  - Grand Cross of the Star of Romania
  - Grand Cross of the Crown of Romania
  - Grand Cross of the Order of Carol I, with Collar, 1906
  - Founder of the Order of Michael the Brave, 26 September 1916
- (Hohenzollern-Sigmaringen) Hohenzollern: Cross of Honour of the Princely House Order of Hohenzollern, 1st Class
- Kingdom of Prussia:
  - Knight of the Black Eagle, 10 January 1893; with Collar
  - Grand Cross of the Red Eagle, with Swords
- Duchy of Anhalt: Grand Cross of the Order of Albert the Bear, 1887
- Kingdom of Bavaria: Knight of St. Hubert, 1908
- (Saxe-Coburg and Gotha) (Duchy of Saxe-Altenburg) (Saxe-Meiningen) Ernestine duchies: Grand Cross of the Saxe-Ernestine House Order
- Grand Duchy of Hesse: Grand Cross of the Ludwig Order, 19 April 1894
- Kingdom of Saxony: Knight of the Rue Crown
- (Austrian Empire) (Kingdom of Hungary) Austria-Hungary:
  - Grand Cross of the Royal Hungarian Order of St. Stephen, 1890
  - Knight of the Golden Fleece, 1909
- Belgium: Grand Cordon of the Order of Leopold
- Bulgaria: Grand Cross of St. Alexander
- Czechoslovakia: Collar of the White Lion, 1925
- Denmark: Knight of the Elephant, 8 January 1908
- France: Grand Cross of the Legion of Honour
- Greece: Grand Cross of the Redeemer
- Italy: Knight of the Annunciation, 30 January 1893
- Sovereign Military Order of Malta: Knight of Honour and Devotion
- Montenegro: Grand Cross of the Order of Prince Danilo I
- Netherlands: Grand Cross of the Netherlands Lion
- Poland:
  - Knight of the White Eagle, 31 August 1921
  - Grand Cross of the Virtuti Militari, with Star, 21 June 1923
- Portugal:
  - Kingdom of Portugal: Grand Cross of the Sash of the Two Orders
  - Portuguese Republic: Grand Cross of the Tower and Sword, 11 May 1921
- Russia:
  - Knight of St. Andrew, 1894
  - Knight of St. Alexander Nevsky
  - Knight of the White Eagle
  - Knight of St. Anna, 1st Class
  - Knight of St. Stanislaus, 1st Class
  - Knight of St. George, 2nd Class, 15 March 1918
- Serbia:
  - Grand Cross of the White Eagle
  - Grand Cross of the Star of Karađorđe, with Swords
- Sweden: Knight of the Seraphim, 18 December 1907
- United Kingdom:
  - Honorary Grand Cross of the Bath (civil), 21 December 1892
  - Stranger Knight Companion of the Garter, 14 May 1924
  - Royal Victorian Chain
  - Honorary Grand Cross of the Royal Victorian Order

== Ancestry ==
Ancestors of Ferdinand I of Romania

8. Karl, Prince of Hohenzollern-Sigmaringen
4. Karl Anton, Prince of Hohenzollern
9. Marie Antoinette Murat
2. Leopold, Prince of Hohenzollern
10. Charles, Grand Duke of Baden
5. Princess Josephine of Baden
11. Stéphanie de Beauharnais
1. Ferdinand I of Romania
12. Prince Ferdinand of Saxe-Coburg and Gotha
6. Fernando II of Portugal
13. Princess Maria Antonia Koháry of Csábrág and Szitnya
3. Infanta Antónia of Portugal
14. Pedro I of Brazil and IV of Portugal
7. Maria II of Portugal
15. Archduchess Leopoldina of Austria

Ferdinand I of Romania House of Hohenzollern-Sigmaringen Cadet branch of the House of Hohenzollern Born: 24 August 1865 Died: 20 July 1927
Regnal titles
Preceded by Carol I	King of Romania; 10 October 1914 – 20 July 1927	Succeeded by Michael I
