= Herzog-Max-Palais =

Former palace in Munich, Germany

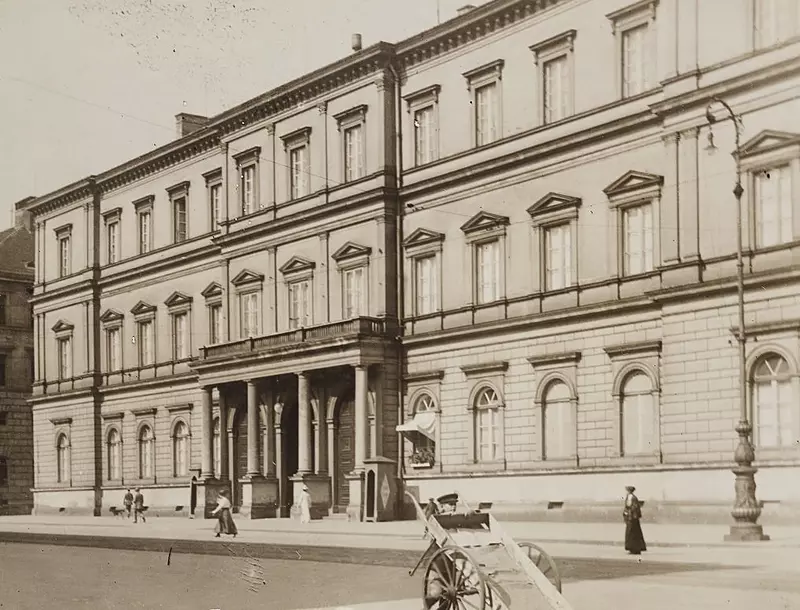
- Herzog-Max-Palais in 1900
- Interactive map of the Herzog-Max-Palais area

General information
- Status: Destroyed
- Type: Palace
- Architectural style: Neoclassical
- Location: Ludwigstraße 13; Munich, Germany
- Coordinates: 48.1458°N 11.5787°E
- Construction started: 1828
- Completed: 1831
- Destroyed: 1937

Design and construction
- Architect: Leo von Klenze

The Herzog-Max-Palais was a neoclassical palace at Ludwigstraße 13 in Munich, Germany. It belonged to the House of Wittelsbach and was built from 1828 to 1830 for Duke Maximilian Joseph in Bavaria, father of Empress Elisabeth of Austria. In 1937, the palace was destroyed by the Nazi Party in order to widen the Ludwigstraße. The successor construction was started in 1938 by Heinrich Wolff for the Reichsbank and was completed in 1951 for the Deutsche Bundesbank.

== History ==
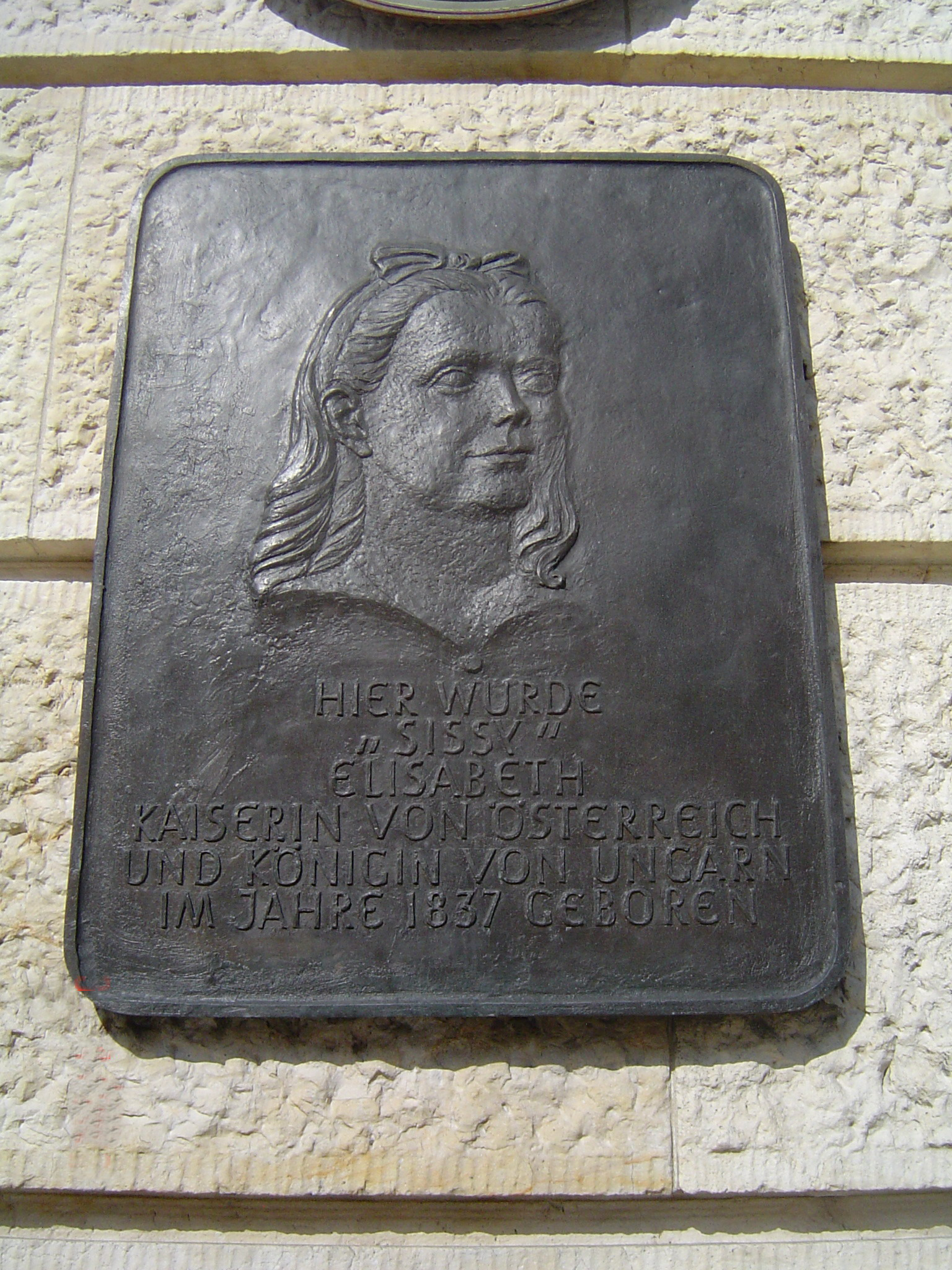
Plaque commemorating Herzog-Max-Palais as the birthplace of Empress Elisabeth of Austria

The Herzog-Max-Palais was constructed from 1828 to 1831 according to a design by Leo von Klenze for Ludwig I of Bavaria's brother-in-law Duke Maximilian Joseph in Bavaria. It was located at Ludwigstraße 13, filling up a block between the former Frühlingsstraße (now Oskar-von-Miller-Ring) and the Schönfeldstraße (now Rheinbergerstraße). The palace contained a theater, café, and extensive library. Duchess Elisabeth in Bavaria, later the Empress of Austria, was born in the palace on 24 December 1837.

In 1937, the palace was destroyed as part of the Nazi Party's urban redevelopment plan, and Heinrich Wolff began building a neoclassical building for the Munich branch of the Reichsbank in its place. The building was completed in 1951 by Carl Sattler and today houses the headquarters of the Bundesbank in Bavaria; the building features a plaque commemorating Ludwigstraße 13 as the birthplace of Empress Elisabeth.

In 1981, German architect Erwin Schleich described the Herzog-Max-Palais as "probably the most beautiful aristocratic palace that Leo von Klenze ... erected."

== Gallery ==
Herzog-Max-Palais
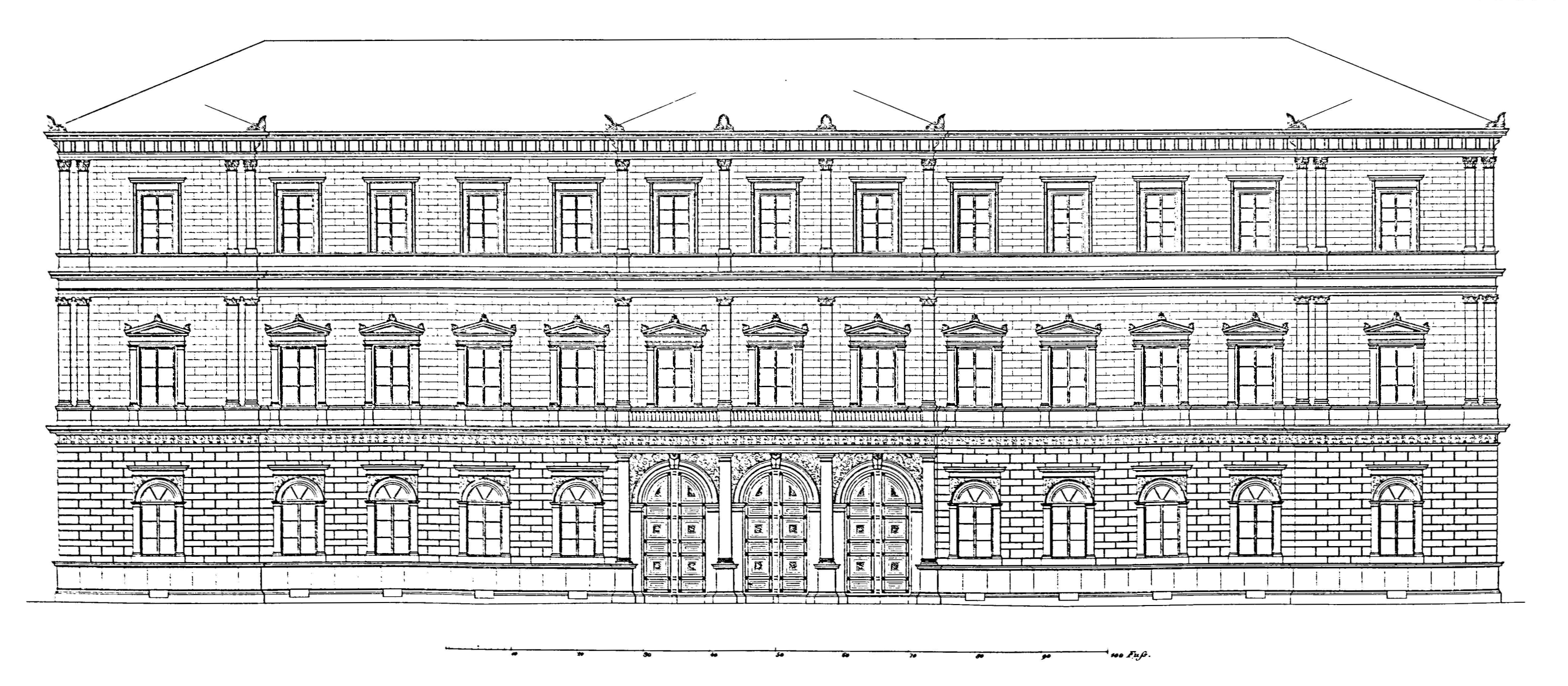
Sketch by Leo von Klenze, 1830

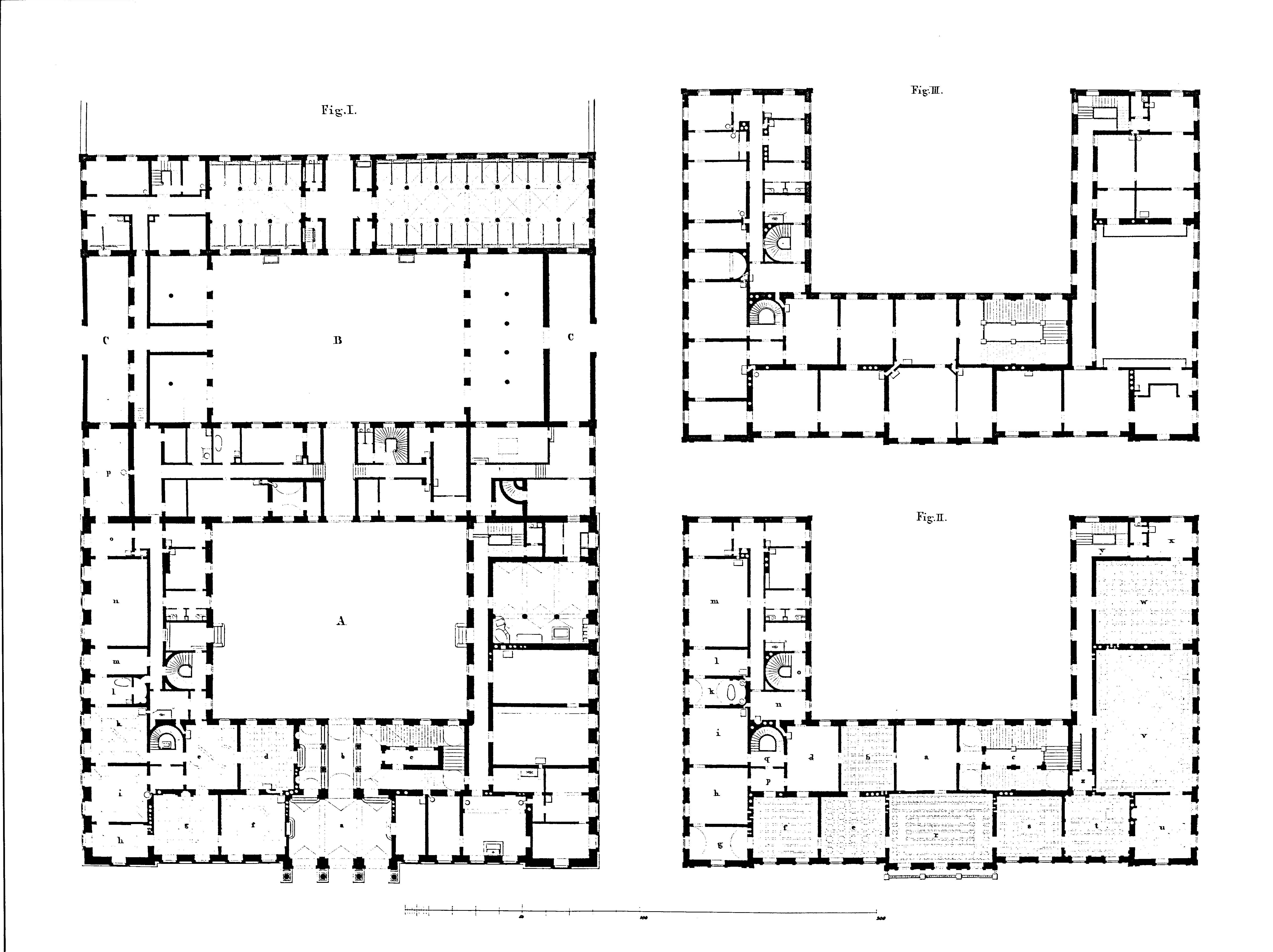
Floor plan, 1830
