= Princess Maria Alix of Saxony =

Princess of Saxony and Princess of Hohenzollern-Emden

- Princess of Hohenzollern-Emden
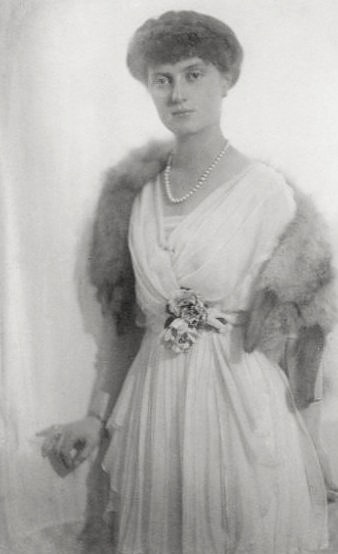
- Maria Alix in 1921
- Born: 27 September 1901; Dresden, Kingdom of Saxony
- Died: 11 December 1990 (aged 89); Hechingen, Germany
- Spouse: Franz Joseph, Prince of Hohenzollern-Emden (m. 1921; died 1964)
- Issue: Prince Karl Anton; Prince Meinrad; Princess Maria Margherita; Prince Emanuel
Names
- Maria Alix Luitpolda Anna Henrietta Germana Agnes Damian Michaela
- House: Wettin (Albertine line)
- Father: Frederick Augustus III of Saxony
- Mother: Archduchess Louise of Austria
- Religion: Roman Catholicism

Princess Maria Alix of Saxony (27 September 1901 – 11 December 1990) was a member of the House of Wettin and the daughter of the last king of Saxony, Frederick Augustus III. Through her marriage to Franz Joseph, Prince of Hohenzollern-Emden, she became a princess of the House of Hohenzollern-Sigmaringen.

== Early life ==
She was born in Dresden as the fourth child and third daughter of Crown Prince Frederick and Crown Princess Louise. Her godparents included Archduke Ludwig Victor of Austria and her maternal grandmother, Grand Duchess Alice of Tuscany.

Her childhood was profoundly affected by the domestic scandal of her parents; in December 1902, while Maria Alix was only a year old, her mother fled the Dresden court while pregnant with her youngest sister, Anna. Maria Alix was raised in the strict environment of the Saxon court under the sole custody of her father, who became King in 1904.

== Marriage and issue ==
On 25 May 1921, Princess Maria Alix married Franz Joseph, Prince of Hohenzollern-Emden at Schloss Sibyllenort. Her husband was the son of Wilhelm, Prince of Hohenzollern and Princess Maria Theresa of Bourbon-Two Sicilies.Together, they had four children:

- Prince Karl Anton (28 January 1922 – 3 November 1993). Married Alexandra Afif ạnd had no issue.
- Prince Meinrad (17 January 1925 – 20 March 2009). Married Baroness Edina von Kap-Herr and had issue.
- Princess Maria Margherita (2 January 1928 – 4 August 2006). Married Carl Gregor, Duke of Mecklenburg, the second son of George, Duke of Mecklenburg.
- Prince Emanuel (23 February 1929 – 8 February 1999). Married Princess Katharina of Saxe-Weimar-Eisenach and had issue.

== Later years and death ==
After the fall of the German monarchies in 1918, Maria Alix and her family lived as private citizens. Following the death of her husband in 1964, she lived a quiet life in Baden-Württemberg. She maintained a close relationship with her siblings but remained distant from her mother, Louise, following the family scandals.

Princess Maria Alix died in Hechingen in 1990, aged 89. She was buried at the Hedingen Monastery in Sigmaringen, the traditional burial place of the Hohenzollern-Sigmaringen family, where her mother was also interred.

== Ancestry ==
Ancestors of Princess Maria Alix of Saxony

8. John of Saxony
4. George of Saxony
9. Princess Amalie Auguste of Bavaria
2. Frederick Augustus III of Saxony
10. Fernando II of Portugal
5. Infanta Maria Ana of Portugal
11. Maria II of Portugal
1. Princess Maria Alix of Saxony
12. Leopold II, Grand Duke of Tuscany
6. Ferdinand IV, Grand Duke of Tuscany
13. Princess Maria Antonia of the Two Sicilies
3. Archduchess Louise of Austria
14. Charles III, Duke of Parma
7. Princess Alice of Bourbon-Parma
15. Princess Louise of Artois
