= Princess Adelgunde of Bavaria, Princess of Hohenzollern =

Princess Adelgunde
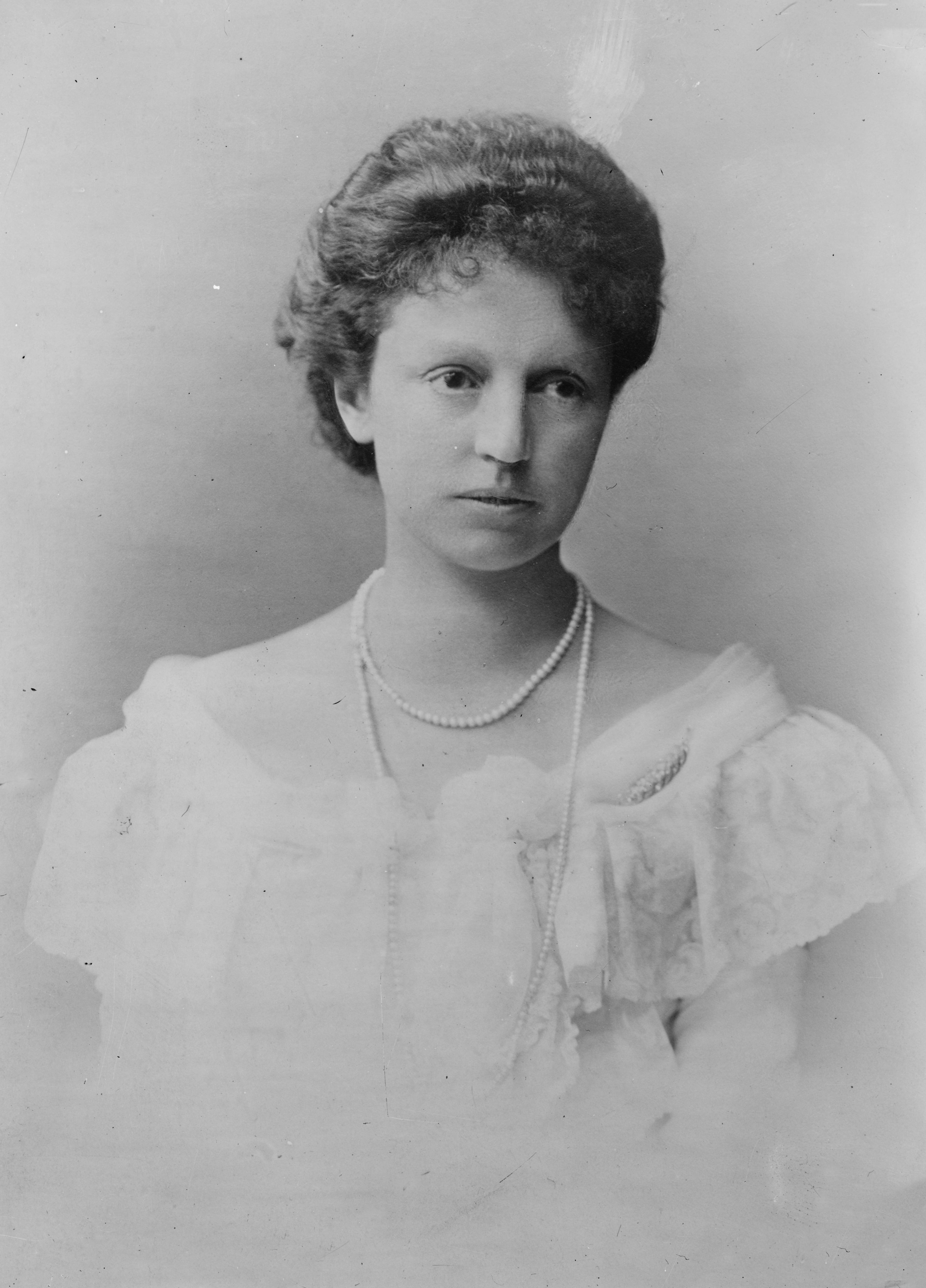
- Princess Adelgunde, 1914.

Princess of Hohenzollern
- Tenure: 20 January 1915 – 22 October 1927
- Born: 17 October 1870; Munich, Kingdom of Bavaria
- Died: 4 January 1958 (aged 87); Sigmaringen, West Germany
- Spouse: William, Prince of Hohenzollern (m. 1915; died 1927)
Names
- German: Adelgunde Marie Auguste Therese
- House: Wittelsbach
- Father: Ludwig III of Bavaria
- Mother: Maria Theresia of Austria-Este

Princess Adelgunde of Bavaria (Adelgunde Marie Auguste Therese Prinzessin von Bayern; 17 October 1870 – 4 January 1958) was a member of the royal House of Wittelsbach by birth and became the Princess of Hohenzollern through her marriage to William, Prince of Hohenzollern.

== Biography ==
=== Early life ===
Princess Adelgunde was born on 17 October 1870 in Lindau, Bavaria, as the second child and eldest daughter of King Ludwig III of Bavaria and Archduchess Maria Theresa of Austria-Este. She grew up in a large family with twelve siblings and spent the vast majority of her happy childhood split between the royal family's primary country estate at Schloss Leutstetten in Starnberg and their summer villa near Lake Constance in Lindau.

=== Marriage and later life ===
During the First World War, on 20 January 1915, she married Prince Wilhelm of Hohenzollern in Munich. Her husband was the eldest son of Leopold, Prince of Hohenzollern and Infanta Antónia of Portugal. Following the 1918 post-war collapse of the German Empire and the abolition of royal privileges, the couple withdrew from public life to their estates in Sigmaringen. The marriage produced no children.

Following her husband's death in October 1927, Princess Adelgunde remained unmarried and focused her later years on local charitable and religious initiatives in Baden-Württemberg. She died in Sigmaringen on 4 January 1958 at the age of 87 and was buried in the family crypt at Kloster Hedingen.

== Ancestry ==
Ancestors of Princess Adelgunde of Bavaria, Princess of Hohenzollern

8. Ludwig I of Bavaria
4. Luitpold, Prince Regent of Bavaria
9. Princess Therese of Saxe-Hildburghausen
2. Ludwig III of Bavaria
10. Leopold II, Grand Duke of Tuscany
5. Archduchess Auguste Ferdinande of Austria
11. Princess Maria Anna of Saxony
1. Princess Adelgunde of Bavaria
12. Francis IV, Duke of Modena
6. Archduke Ferdinand Karl Viktor of Austria-Este
13. Princess Maria Beatrice of Savoy
3. Archduchess Maria Theresa of Ausia-Este
14. Archduke Joseph, Palatine of Hungary
7. Archduchess Elisabeth Franziska of Austria
15. Duchess Maria Dorothea of Württemberg

== Bibliography ==
- Almanach de Gotha: Annuaire généalogique, diplomatique et statistique (in French). Gotha: Justus Perthes. 1923.
- Handbuch des allerhöchsten Hofes und des Hofstaates Seiner K. und K. Apostolischen Majestät (in German). Vienna: K.K. Hof- und Staatsdruckerei. 1918.
- McNaughton, Arnold (1973). The Book of Kings: A Royal Genealogy. Quadrangle/New York Times Book Company. ISBN 978-0812902808.
- Sch things- und Ehrenbuch des Hauses Wittelsbach (in German). Munich: Verlag des Heraldisch-Genealogischen Vereines. 1926.

Princess Adelgunde of Bavaria, Princess of Hohenzollern House of Wittelsbach Born: 17 October 1870 Died: 4 January 1958
Titles in pretence
| Preceded by Princess Maria Teresa of Bourbon-Two Sicilies | — TITULAR — Princess of Hohenzollern; Princess of Hohenzollern-Sigmaringen; Princess of Hohenzollern-Hechingen; Countess of Hohenzollern-Haigerloch; 20 January 1915 – 22 October 1927; Reason for succession failure: Principality annexed by the Kingdom of Prussia in 1850 | Succeeded by Princess Margarete Karola of Saxony |
