= Prince Louis, Count of Trani =

Prince of the Two Sicilies (1838–1886)

Prince Louis
- Count of Trani
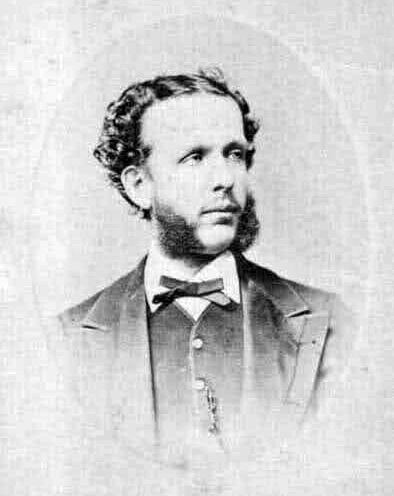
- Prince Louis c. 1870
- Born: 1 August 1838; Naples, Two Sicilies
- Died: 8 June 1886 (aged 47); Paris, France
- Spouse: Duchess Mathilde Ludovika in Bavaria (m. 1861)
- Issue: Maria Teresa, Princess of Hohenzollern
Names
- Italian: Lodovico Maria
- House: House of Bourbon-Two Sicilies
- Father: Ferdinand II of the Two Sicilies
- Mother: Maria Theresa of Austria

Prince Louis Maria of Bourbon-Two Sicilies, Count of Trani (1 August 1838 – 8 June 1886) was a member of the royal family of the Kingdom of the Two Sicilies.

The eldest son of King Ferdinand II of the Two Sicilies and his second wife Archduchess Maria Theresa of Austria, he was heir presumptive to his elder half-brother King Francis II of the Two Sicilies from 1859 to 1861.

== Heir to the throne ==
Prince Louis was born on 1 August 1838 in Naples as the second son of Ferdinand II, King of the Two Sicilies, and his second wife Maria Theresa of Austria, a daughter of Archduke Charles of Austria, Duke of Teschen. Louis was a younger half-brother of Prince Francis of the Two Sicilies, and was second-in-line to the throne of the Kingdom of the Two Sicilies since the time of his birth.

Their father died on 22 May 1859, and Luigi's older brother ascended the throne of the Two Sicilies as King Francis II. As Francis still had no children from his wife Maria Sophie of Bavaria, Prince Louis became his heir presumptive. However the Two Sicilies were conquered by the Expedition of the Thousand under Giuseppe Garibaldi in 1861. Garibaldi served the Kingdom of Sardinia which was in the process of Italian unification.

Louis was still the heir of Francis as head of a deposed royal house. He retained this position for the rest of his life but predeceased Francis. Francis was eventually succeeded by their younger brother Prince Alfonso, Count of Caserta.

== Marriage ==
On 5 June 1861, Louis married Duchess Mathilde Ludovika in Bavaria, the fourth daughter of Maximilian, Duke in Bavaria and Princess Ludovika of Bavaria. Two of Mathilde's sisters were Elisabeth of Bavaria, married to the Emperor of Austria, and Marie Sophie of Bavaria, wife of Louis's older half-brother Francis II of the Two Sicilies. The marriage was unsuccessful almost from the start, and while Louis took refuge in alcohol, Mathilde spent most of her life traveling from place to place, often accompanied by her sisters.

Louis and Mathilde had a single daughter:

- Princess Maria Teresa of Bourbon-Two Sicilies (15 January 1867, Zurich - 1 May 1909, Cannes).

Louis had one illegitimate son:

- Charles of Duzzio (1869–1931).

Princess Maria Teresa married Prince Wilhelm of Hohenzollern-Sigmaringen on 27 June 1889 and later became the Princess of Hohenzollern when her father-in-law died in 1905. She had two sons and a daughter.

== Death ==
Louis died of heart disease in Paris on 8 June 1886.

== Ancestry ==
Ancestors of Prince Louis, Count of Trani

8. Ferdinand I of the Two Sicilies
4. Francis I of the Two Sicilies
9. Archduchess Maria Carolina of Austria
2. Ferdinand II of the Two Sicilies
10. Charles IV of Spain
5. Infanta María Isabel of Spain
11. Princess Maria Luisa of Parma
1. Prince Louis, Count of Trani
12. Leopold II, Holy Roman Emperor
6. Archduke Charles, Duke of Teschen
13. Infanta Maria Luisa of Spain
3. Maria Theresa of Austria
14. Frederick William, Prince of Nassau-Weilburg
7. Princess Henrietta of Nassau-Weilburg
15. Burgravine Louise Isabelle of Kirchberg

== Sources ==
- "The Book of Kings: A Royal Genealogy" by C. Arnold McNaughton.
