= Infanta Antónia of Portugal =

Portuguese infanta (1845–1913)

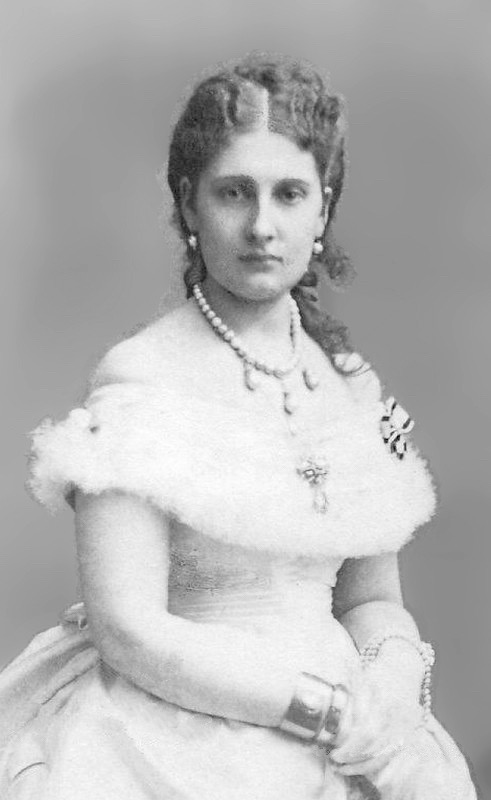
- Antónia in 1870

Princess consort of Hohenzollern
- Tenure: 2 June 1885 – 8 June 1905
- Born: 17 February 1845; Belém Palace, Lisbon, Kingdom of Portugal
- Died: 27 December 1913 (aged 68); Sigmaringen, German Empire
- Spouse: Leopold, Prince of Hohenzollern (m. 1861; died 1905)
- Issue: William, Prince of Hohenzollern; Ferdinand I of Romania; Prince Karl Anton
Names
- Portuguese: Antónia María Fernanda Micaela Gabriela Rafaela Francisca de Assis Ana Gonzaga Silvina Júlia Augusta de Saxe-Coburgo e Bragança
- House: Braganza
- Father: Ferdinand of Saxe-Coburg and Gotha
- Mother: Maria II of Portugal

Infanta Antónia of Portugal (European Portuguese: [ɐ̃ˈtɔni.ɐ, ɐ̃ˈtɔnjɐ]; Antónia Maria Fernanda Micaela Gabriela Rafaela Francisca de Assis Ana Gonzaga Silvéria Júlia Augusta de Saxe-Coburgo e Bragança; 17 February 1845 – 27 December 1913) also known as Antónia of Braganza, was a Portuguese infanta (princess) of the House of Braganza. She was the daughter of Queen Maria II of Portugal and her King consort Ferdinand II of Portugal. Through her father, she also held the titles of Princess of Saxe-Coburg and Gotha and Duchess of Saxony.

== Life ==
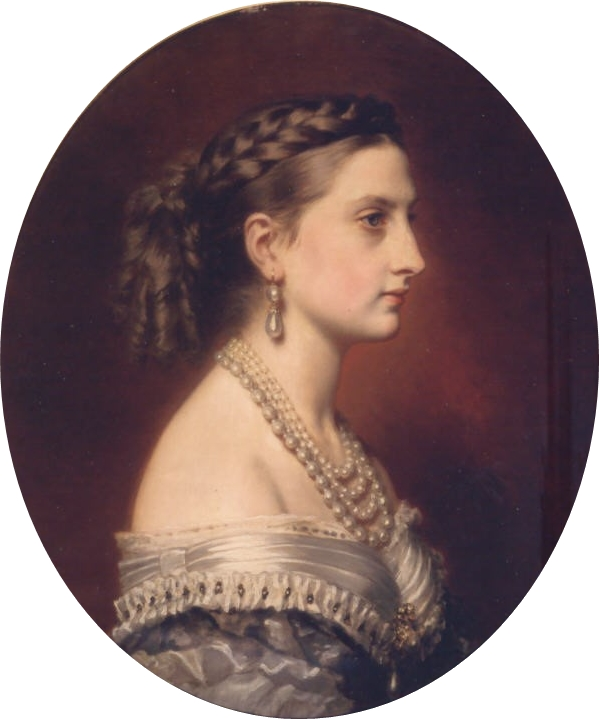
Princess Antonia of Hohenzollern-Sigmaringen, 1866.

Antónia was born on 17 February 1845 at the Palace of Belém, she was the sixth child of eleven, and the third girl. She married Leopold, Prince of Hohenzollern-Sigmaringen on 12 September 1861. They had three sons:

- William (1864–1927), who succeeded as Prince of Hohenzollern; married (1) Princess Maria Teresa of Bourbon-Two Sicilies (2) Princess Adelgunde of Bavaria
- Ferdinand (1865–1927), later King of Romania; married Princess Marie of Edinburgh
- Karl Anton (1868–1919), married Princess Josephine Caroline of Belgium

Princess Marie of Edinburgh, her daughter-in-law, described her appearance in her memoirs:

"Antonia, or Antoinette, had been one of the great beauties of her time; one of those old-fashioned, classic-featured beauties, whom one associates with the crinoline. Her profile was Grecian, her shoulders sloping, her hands long and delicate, her feet very small and useless. But her figure somehow could not fit in with the clothes of the day, there was a disproportion between the bust and the legs. The crinoline was missing. Superbly aristocratic, she moved slowly with a curious swinging of the hips. She loved fine clothes and jewels and, though leading almost an invalid's life, was always very smartly dressed." Later, Marie also wrote on their complicated relationship and views on her mother-in-law's character: "She was a curious mixture of dignity and childish futility, vain, self-centered, small in her judgements of others. [...] She lived so protected, so out of the world, hedged in by her Church, nursing her delicate health, everybody serving her, spoiling her, she was more like an exigent child than a woman who had lived a real woman's life. [..] I really think she liked me then, but there was also something else in this; I was to be shown off as a favourite to spite Mädi, her eldest daughter-in-law."

Antónia of Braganza died in the German Empire on 27 December 1913.

== Honours and awards ==
- Kingdom of Portugal:
  - Dame of the Order of Queen Saint Isabel
  - Grand Cross of the Immaculate Conception of Vila Viçosa
- Kingdom of Prussia:
  - Dame of the Order of Louise, 1st Division
  - Cross of Merit for Women and Girls, 26 June 1871
- Austria-Hungary: Dame of the Order of the Starry Cross, 1st Class
- (Saxe-Coburg and Gotha) (Duchy of Saxe-Altenburg) (Saxe-Meiningen) Ernestine duchies: Grand Cross of the Saxe-Ernestine House Order
- Kingdom of Romania: Dame of the Decoration of the Cross of Queen Elisabeth
- Spain: Dame of the Order of Queen Maria Luisa, 23 October 1855

== Ancestry ==
Ancestors of Infanta Antónia of Portugal

8. Francis, Duke of Saxe-Coburg-Saalfeld
4. Ferdinand, Prince of Saxe-Coburg and Gotha-Koháry
9. Countess Augusta Reuss of Ebersdorf
2. Fernando II of Portugal
10. Ferenc József, Prince Koháry de Csábrág et Szitnya
5. Princess Mária Antónia Koháry de Csábrág et Szitnya
11. Countess Maria Antonia von Waldstein zu Wartenberg
1. Infanta Antónia of Portugal
12. João VI of Portugal
6. Pedro I of Brazil and IV of Portugal
13. Infanta Carlota Joaquina of Spain
3. Maria II of Portugal
14. Francis II, Holy Roman Emperor
7. Archduchess Leopoldina of Austria
15. Princess Maria Theresa of Naples and Sicily

Infanta Antónia of Portugal House of Braganza Cadet branch of the House of Aviz and House of Saxe-Coburg and Gotha Born: 17 February 1845 Died: 27 December 1913
Titles in pretence
Preceded by Princess Josephine of Baden	— TITULAR — Princess consort of Hohenzollern; 2 June 1885 – 8 June 1905; Reason for succession failure: Principality annexed by the Kingdom of Prussia in 1850	Succeeded by Princess Maria Teresa of Bourbon-Two Sicilies
