= Duchess Mathilde Ludovika in Bavaria =

Princess Mathilde Ludovika
- Countess of Trani
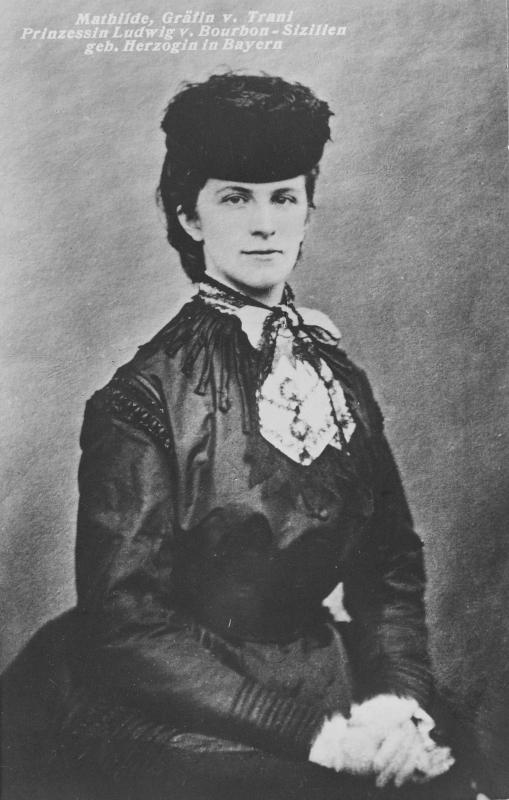
- Born: 30 September 1843; Possenhofen, Kingdom of Bavaria
- Died: 18 June 1925 (aged 81); Munich, Weimar Republic
- Spouse: Prince Louis, Count of Trani (m. 1861; died 1886)
- Issue: Maria Teresa, Princess of Hohenzollern
- House: Wittelsbach
- Father: Duke Maximilian Joseph in Bavaria
- Mother: Princess Ludovika of Bavaria

Mathilde Ludovika, Duchess in Bavaria (30 September 1843 – 18 June 1925) was the fourth daughter of Maximilian, Duke in Bavaria, and Princess Ludovika of Bavaria. Her mother was the youngest surviving daughter of King Maximilian I Joseph of Bavaria and his second wife Margravine Karoline of Baden.

== Early life ==
Born and raised at Possenhofen Castle, Mathilde was a younger sister of (among others) Duke Karl-Theodor in Bavaria, Elisabeth of Austria-Hungary, and Duchess Marie Sophie in Bavaria. She was an older sister of (among others) Duchess Sophie in Bavaria. Her godmother and namesake was her mother's aunt Grand Duchess Mathilde of Hesse and by Rhine.

== Marriage and family ==
On 5 June 1861, Mathilde married Prince Lodovico of Bourbon Two-Siclies, Count of Trani. He was heir presumptive to his older half-brother Francis II of the Two Sicilies. Francis was married to her older sister Marie Sophie. The bride was 17 years old and the groom was 22. They had one child, a daughter:

- Princess Maria Teresa Maddalena of Bourbon-Two Sicilies (15 January 1867 – 1 May 1909). She married Prince Wilhelm of Hohenzollern-Sigmaringen.

Allegedly, during the early years of her marriage, Mathilde had an affair with the Spanish diplomat Salvador Bermúdez de Castro y Díez, 1st Duke of Ripalda and Santa Lucía, with whom she had a daughter at the Villa Farnesina in Rome:

- María Salvadora Bermúdez de Castro (20 January 1864 – 18 September 1945), later 2nd Duchess of Santa Lucía. Sent to Brighton immediately after her birth, she was raised by her paternal family and legally adopted by her father only in 1879; she probably never saw her mother. She married Alvaro Pérez de Barradas y Fernández de Cordoba, 12th Marquess of Peñaflor.

== Two Sicilies Revolution ==
However, the Two Sicilies were conquered by the Expedition of the Thousand under Giuseppe Garibaldi in 1861. Garibaldi served the Kingdom of Sardinia which was in the process of Italian unification.

Lodovico was still the heir of Francis as head of a deposed Royal House. He retained this position for the rest of his life but predeceased Francis on 8 June 1886. Francis was eventually succeeded by their younger brother Prince Alfonso, Count of Caserta. Mathilde survived her husband by thirty-nine years but never remarried.

== Ancestry ==
Ancestors of Duchess Mathilde Ludovika in Bavaria

8. Duke Wilhelm in Bavaria
4. Duke Pius August in Bavaria
9. Countess Palatine Maria Anna of Zweibrücken-Birkenfeld
2. Duke Maximilian Joseph in Bavaria
10. Prince Louis of Arenberg
5. Princess Amélie Louise of Arenberg
11. Marie Adélaïde Julie de Mailly-Nesle
1. Duchess Mathilde Ludovika in Bavaria
12. Frederick Michael, Count Palatine of Zweibrücken
6. Maximilian I Joseph of Bavaria
13. Countess Palatine Maria Franziska of Sulzbach
3. Princess Ludovika of Bavaria
14. Charles Louis, Hereditary Prince of Baden
7. Princess Caroline of Baden
15. Princess Amalie of Hesse-Darmstadt
