= Duke Maximilian Joseph in Bavaria =

German noble (1808–1888)

Maximilian Joseph
- Duke of Bavaria
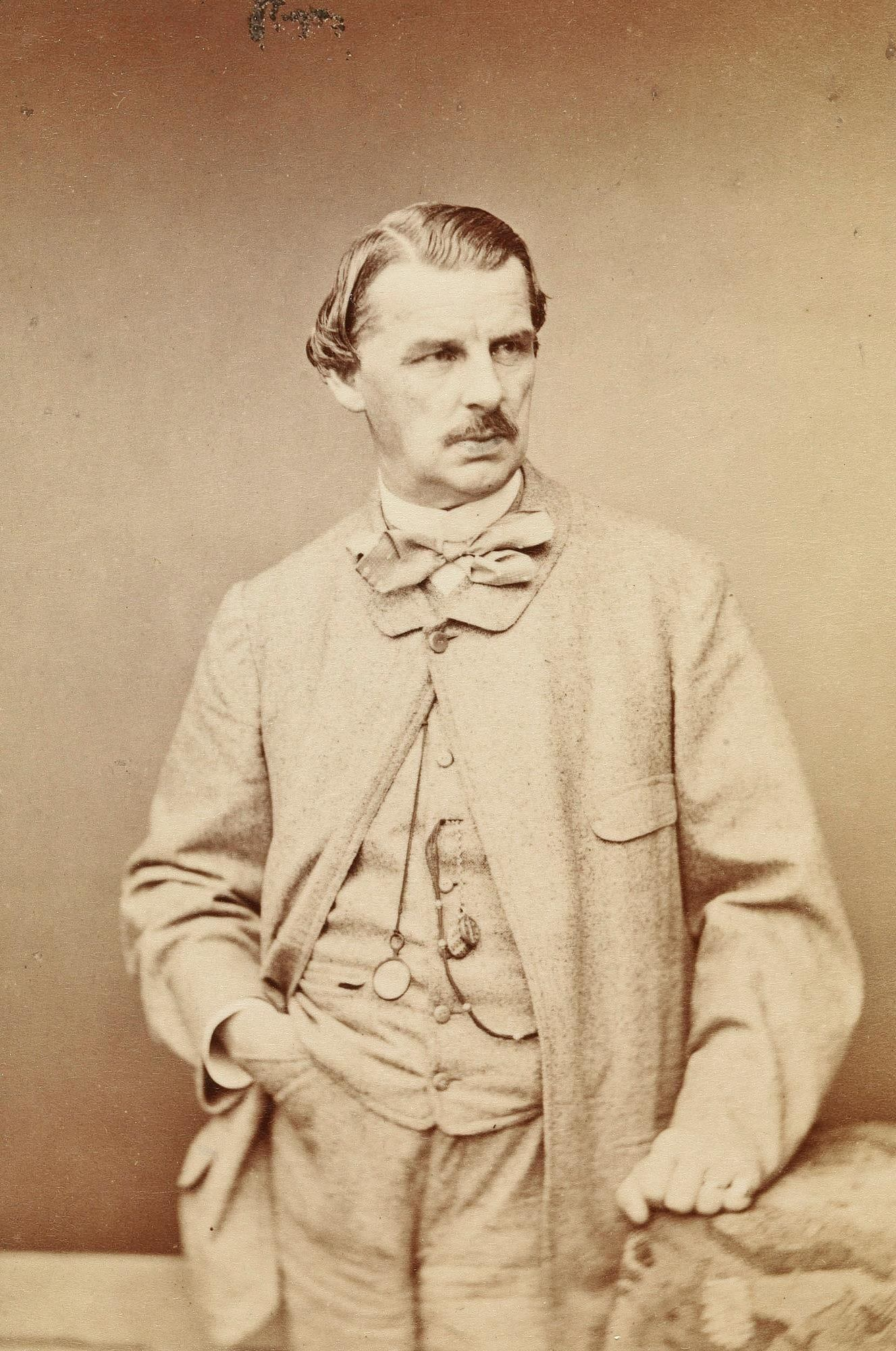
- Maximilian Joseph, c. 1870
- Born: 4 December 1808; Bamberg, Kingdom of Bavaria
- Died: 15 November 1888 (aged 79); Herzog-Max-Palais, Munich, German Empire
- Spouse: Princess Ludovika of Bavaria (m. 1828)
- Issue: Ludwig Wilhelm, Duke of Bavaria; Wilhelm Karl, Duke of Bavaria; Helene, Hereditary Princess of Thurn and Taxis; Elisabeth, Empress of Austria and Queen of Hungary; Karl Theodor, Duke in Bavaria; Marie Sophie, Queen of the Two Sicilies; Mathilde Ludovika, Countess of Trani; Maximilian, Duke of Bavaria; Sophie Charlotte, Duchess of Alençon; Maximilian Emanuel, Duke of Bavaria
- House: Wittelsbach
- Father: Duke Pius August in Bavaria
- Mother: Princess Amélie Louise of Arenberg

Duke Maximilian Joseph of Bavaria (4 December 1808 – 15 November 1888), known informally as Max in Bayern, was a member of a junior branch of the royal House of Wittelsbach who were Kings of Bavaria, and a promoter of Bavarian folk-music. He is most famous today as the father of Empress Elisabeth of Austria ("Sisi") and great-grandfather of King Leopold III of Belgium.

== Life ==
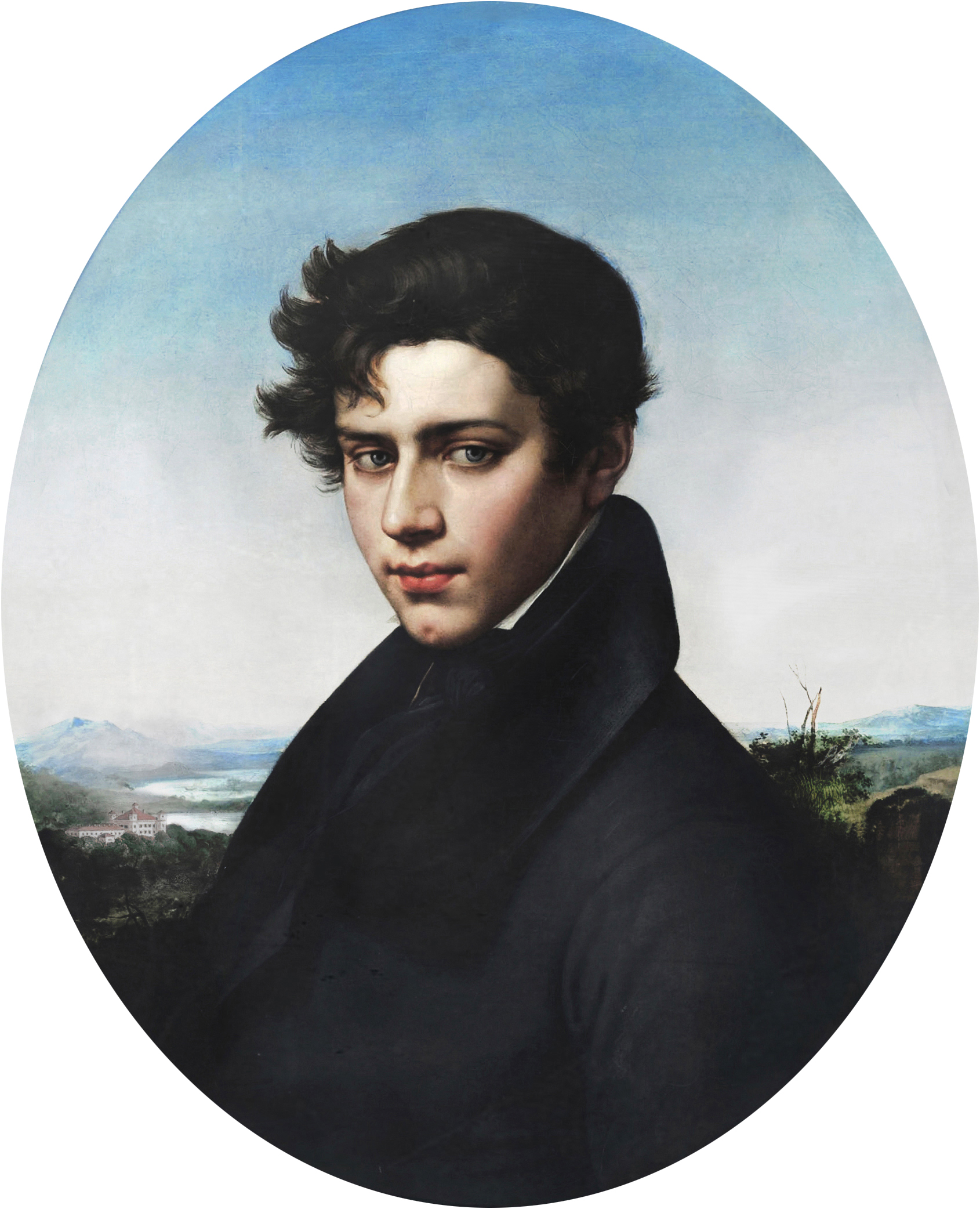
A young Duke Maximilian Joseph. Portrait painting by Joseph Karl Stieler, between 1825 and 1831.

Maximilian Joseph was born on 4 December 1808 at the Neue Residenz at Bamberg in the Kingdom of Bavaria, the only son of Duke Pius August in Bavaria (1786–1837) and his wife, Princess Amélie Louise of Arenberg (1789–1823). His father was a member of the non-reigning ducal line of the widely branched House of Wittelsbach whose members held the titles of Duke and Duchess in Bavaria.

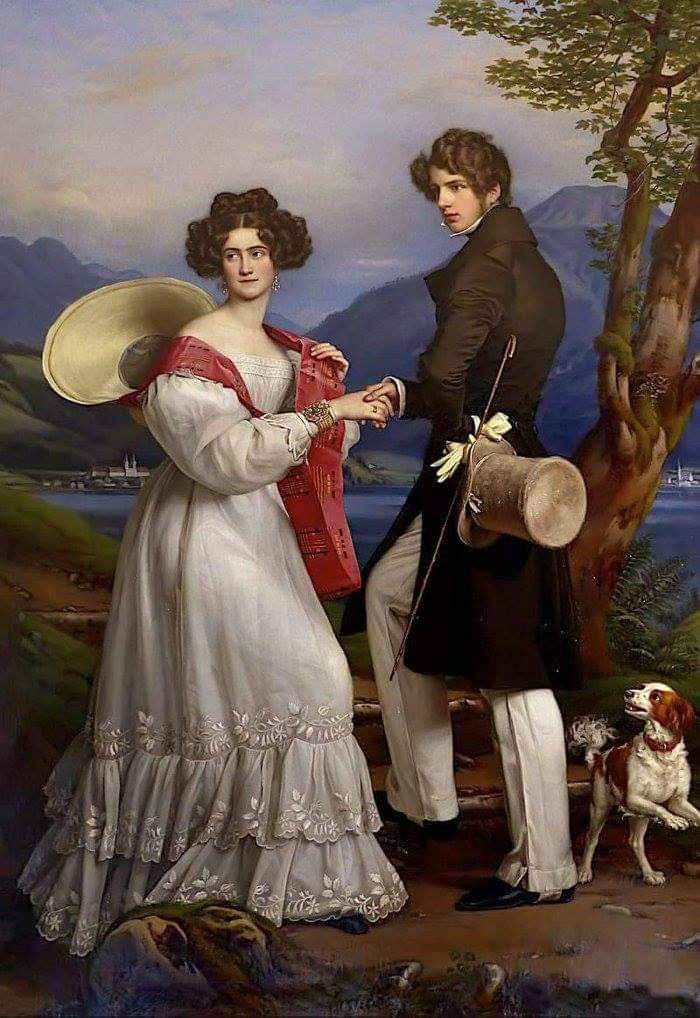
Engagement portrait of Duke Maximilian Joseph in Bavaria and Princess Ludovika of Bavaria. Painting by Joseph Karl Stieler, 1828.

On 9 September 1828, at Tegernsee, Maximilian Joseph married his father's cousin, Princess Ludovika of Bavaria, the sixth daughter of King Maximilian I Joseph of Bavaria. They had ten children.

In 1834, he purchased Possenhofen Castle on Lake Starnberg; this was his major residence for the rest of his life. In 1838 he acquired Unterwittelsbach Castle (today housing a "Sisi" museum) near the site of Burg Wittelsbach, the ancestral seat of the House of Wittelsbach. After suffering two strokes, Duke Maximilian Joseph died aged 79 on 15 November 1888 in his residence in Munich. He and his wife are buried in the family crypt in Tegernsee Abbey, a former monastery which Ludovika's father, King Maximilian I Joseph, had acquired in 1817. At the same time of the secularisation, Duke Maximilian Joseph's grandfather Duke Wilhelm in Bavaria had also purchased a former monastery, Banz Abbey. Both properties, Tegernsee and Banz, are still today owned by Prince Max, Duke in Bavaria.

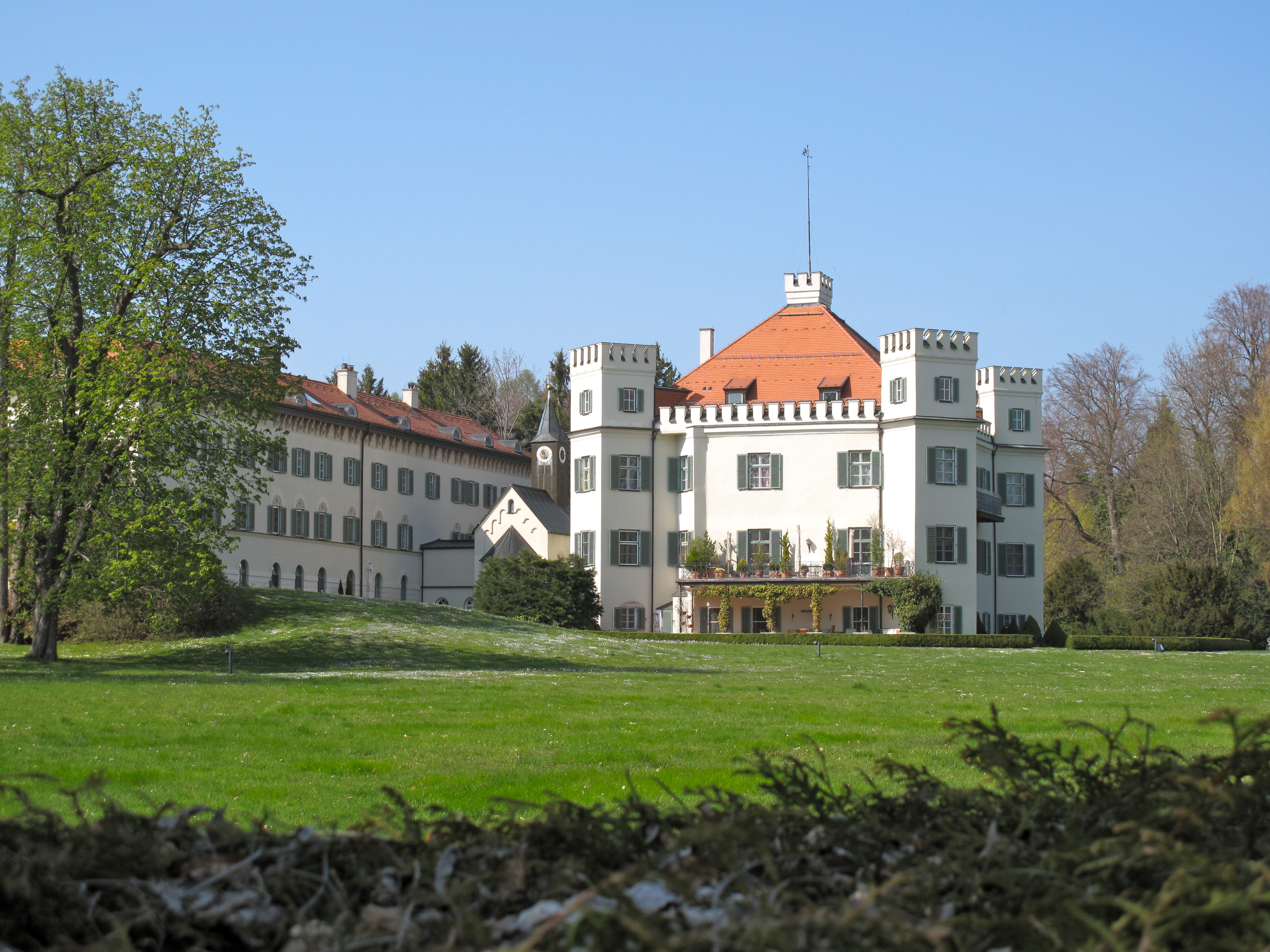
Possenhofen Castle

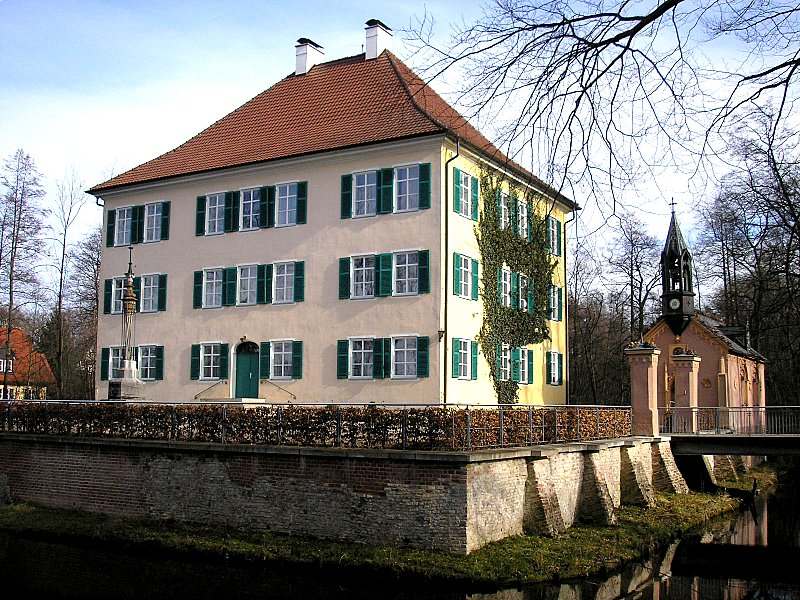
Unterwittelsbach Castle

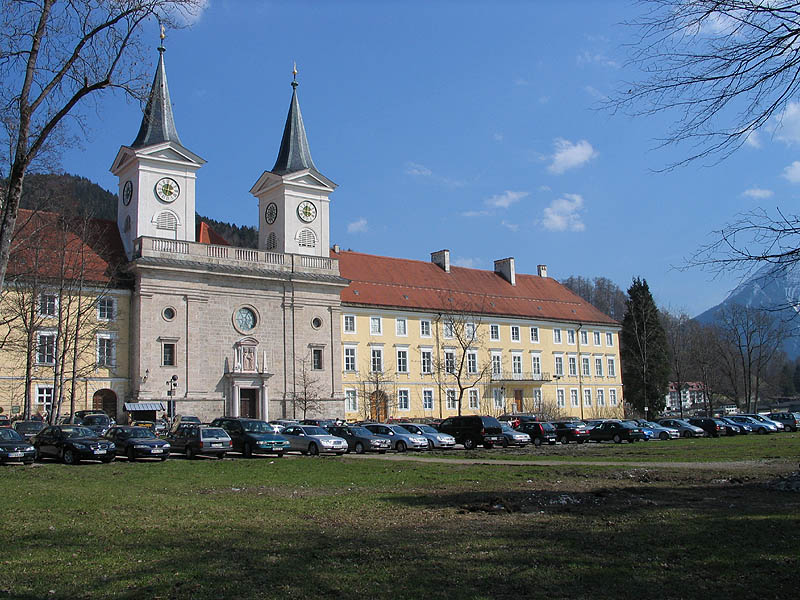
Tegernsee Abbey

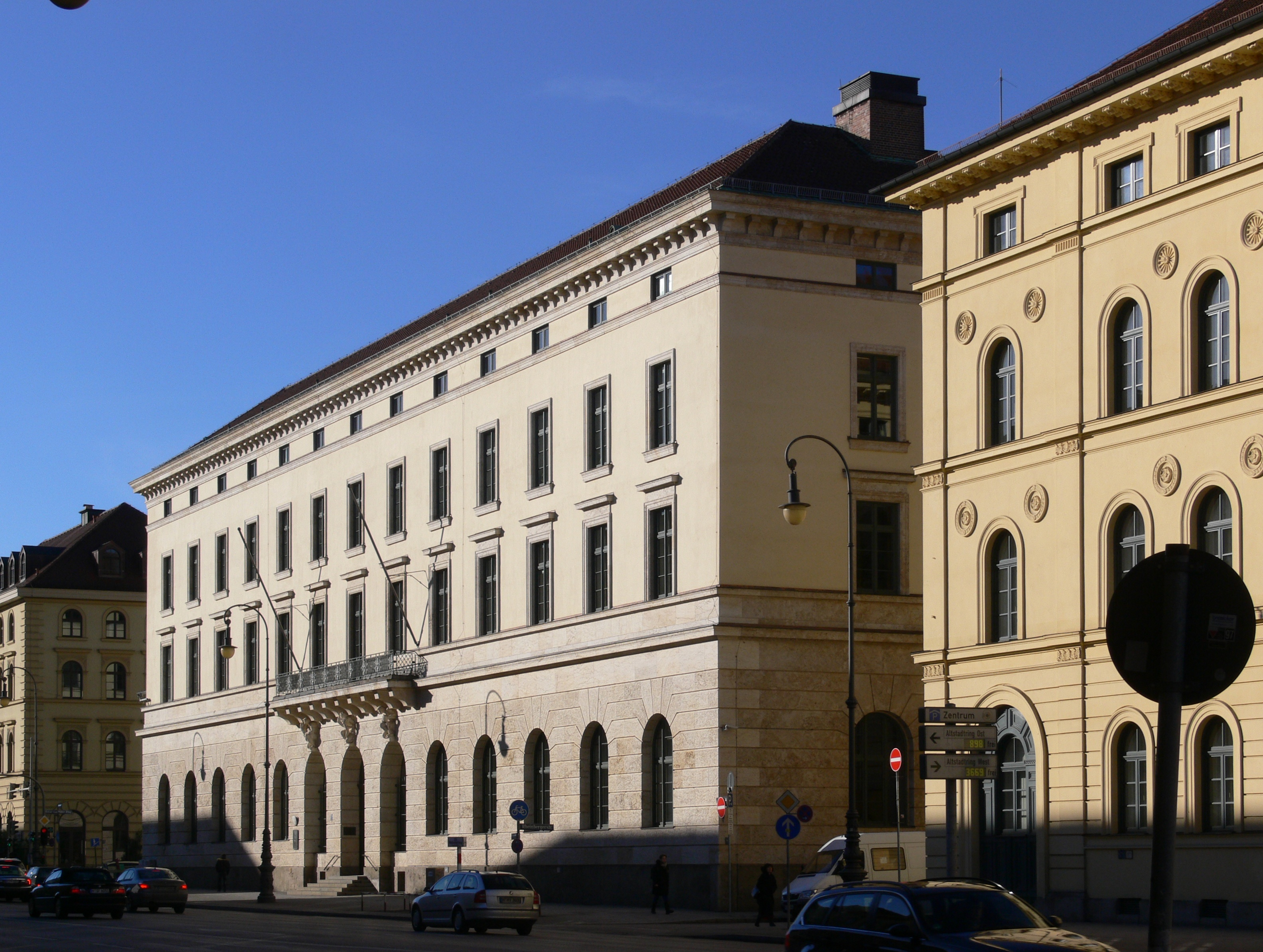
House of Duke Maximilian Joseph in Munich

== Middle East trip ==
In 1838 Maximilian Joseph travelled to Egypt and Palestine. He published an account of this trip: Wanderung nach dem Orient im Jahre 1838 (Munich: Georg Franz, 1839; reprinted Pfaffenhofen: Ludwig, 1978). While climbing the Great Pyramid, he arranged for his servants to yodel as if he were climbing in the Alps. He collected a number of antiquities which he brought back to Bavaria and displayed in his father's home, Banz Abbey; they can still be seen there today. Among the items are the mummy of a young woman, three mummies' heads, several animal mummies, shawabtis, and several stones from tombs or temples including one from the Temple of Dendur. He also bought some children in the Cairo slave market and later freed them. When Maximilian Joseph was in Jerusalem, he paid for the restoration of the Church of the Flagellation on the Via Dolorosa.

== Folk-music ==
Maximilian Joseph was one of the most prominent promoters of Bavarian folk-music in the 19th century. Under his influence the zither started to be used in court circles and eventually became identified as the national musical instrument of Bavaria. Because of his interest he received the nickname Zither-Maxl. He himself played the zither and also composed music for it.

During a visit by his cousin Ludwig II of Bavaria, Ludwig saw some sheet music on Maximilian Joseph's piano by the composer Richard Wagner, which led on to Ludwig's financial support for Wagner from 1863.

Maximilian Joseph's musical compositions have been collected in the work: Die im Druck erschienenen Kompositionen von Herzog Maximilian in Bayern: Ländler, Walzer, Polka, Schottisch, Mazurka, Quadrillen und Märsche für Pianoforte, Zither, Gitarre oder Streichinstrumente (Munich: Musikverlag Emil Katzbichler, 1992).

== Issue ==
Issue
Name	Portrait	Lifespan	Notes
Ludwig Wilhelm ("Louis")		21 June 1831 – 6 November 1920	Married twice (morganatically): 1. Henriette Mendel, Freiin von Wallersee (1833–1891) in 1859; Issue: 1 daughter, 1 son.; 2. Barbara Antonie Barth, Frau von Bartolf (1871–1956) in 1892, divorced 1913; Issue: None.
Wilhelm Karl		24 December 1832 – 13 February 1833	Died in infancy
Helene Caroline Therese ("Nene")		4 April 1834 – 16 May 1890	Married Maximilian, Hereditary Prince of Thurn and Taxis (1831–1867) in 1858; Issue: 2 daughters, 2 sons.
Elisabeth Amalie Eugenie ("Sisi")		24 December 1837 – 10 September 1898	Married Francis Joseph, Emperor of Austria (1830–1916); Issue: 3 daughters, 1 son.
Karl Theodor ("Gackl")		9 August 1839 – 30 November 1909	Married twice: 1. Princess Sophie of Saxony (1845–1867), his cousin, in 1865; Issue: One daughter.; 2. Maria Josepha of Portugal (1857–1943); Issue: 3 daughters, 2 sons.
Marie Sophie Amalie		4 October 1841 – 19 January 1925	Married Francis II, King of the Two Sicilies (1836–1894); Issue: 1 daughter.
Mathilde Ludovika		30 September 1843 – 18 June 1925	Married Lodovico, Count of Trani (1838–1886); Issue: 1 daughter.
Maximilian		8 December 1845	Stillborn
Sophie Charlotte Augustine ("Sopherl")		23 February 1847 – 4 May 1897	Married Ferdinand Philippe Marie, Duke of Alençon (1844–1910); Issue: 1 daughter, 1 son.
Maximilian Emanuel ("Mapperl")		7 December 1849 – 12 June 1893	Married Princess Amalie of Saxe-Coburg and Gotha (1848–1894); Issue: 3 sons.

== Honours ==
He received the following orders and decorations:

- Kingdom of Bavaria: Knight of the Order of Saint Hubert
- Grand Duchy of Hesse: Grand Cross of the Grand Ducal Hessian Order of Ludwig, 26 November 1849
- Kingdom of Prussia: Knight of the Order of the Black Eagle, 20 November 1841
- Kingdom of Saxony: Knight of the Order of the Rue Crown, 1864
- Austrian Empire:
  - Grand Cross of the Royal Hungarian Order of Saint Stephen, 1853
  - Knight of the Distinguished Order of the Golden Fleece, 1854
- Kingdom of Greece: Grand Cross of the Order of the Redeemer
- Two Sicilies: Grand Cross of the Illustrious Royal Order of Saint Ferdinand and Merit
