= Princess Ludovika of Bavaria =

- Duchess in Bavaria
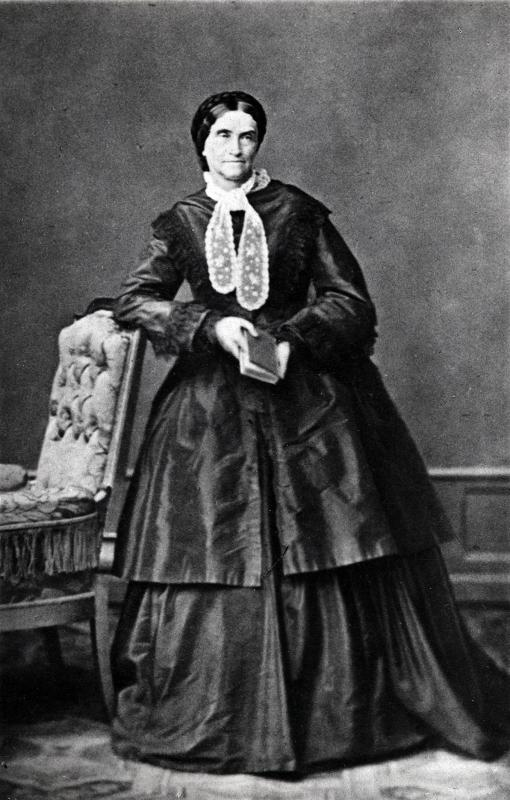
- Born: 30 August 1808; Munich, Kingdom of Bavaria
- Died: 25 January 1892 (aged 83); Munich, German Empire
- Spouse: Duke Maximilian Joseph in Bavaria (m. 1828; died 1888)
- Issue: Ludwig Wilhelm, Duke in Bavaria; Wilhelm Karl, Duke in Bavaria; Helene, Hereditary Princess of Thurn and Taxis; Elisabeth, Empress of Austria and Queen of Hungary; Karl Theodor, Duke in Bavaria; Marie Sophie, Queen of the Two Sicilies; Mathilde Ludovika, Countess of Trani; Maximilian, Duke in Bavaria; Sophie Charlotte, Duchess of Alençon; Maximilian Emanuel, Duke in Bavaria
Names
- Maria Ludovika Wilhelmine
- House: Wittelsbach
- Father: Maximilian I Joseph, King of Bavaria
- Mother: Caroline of Baden

Princess Ludovika of Bavaria (Maria Ludovika Wilhelmine; 30 August 1808 – 25 January 1892) was the fifth child of King Maximilian I Joseph of Bavaria and his second wife Queen Caroline. She was the mother of Empress Elisabeth of Austria and as well as the grandmother of Queen Elisabeth of the Belgians and an ancestor of the current generations of the Belgian and Italian Royal Families and the Grand Ducal Family of Luxembourg.

== Early years ==
Maria Ludovika Wilhelmine was born to King Maximilian I Joseph of Bavaria and Caroline of Baden as their sixth child. The birth of Ludovika was known to be difficult. Ludovika was christened one day after her birth as Ludovika Wilhelmine.

Ludovika and her sisters received many lessons in literature as well as geography and history. They spoke both German and French.

Among her sisters were Elisabeth of Bavaria, Queen of Prussia, and two Queens of Saxony, her older sisters Amalie and Maria Anna.

== Marriage ==
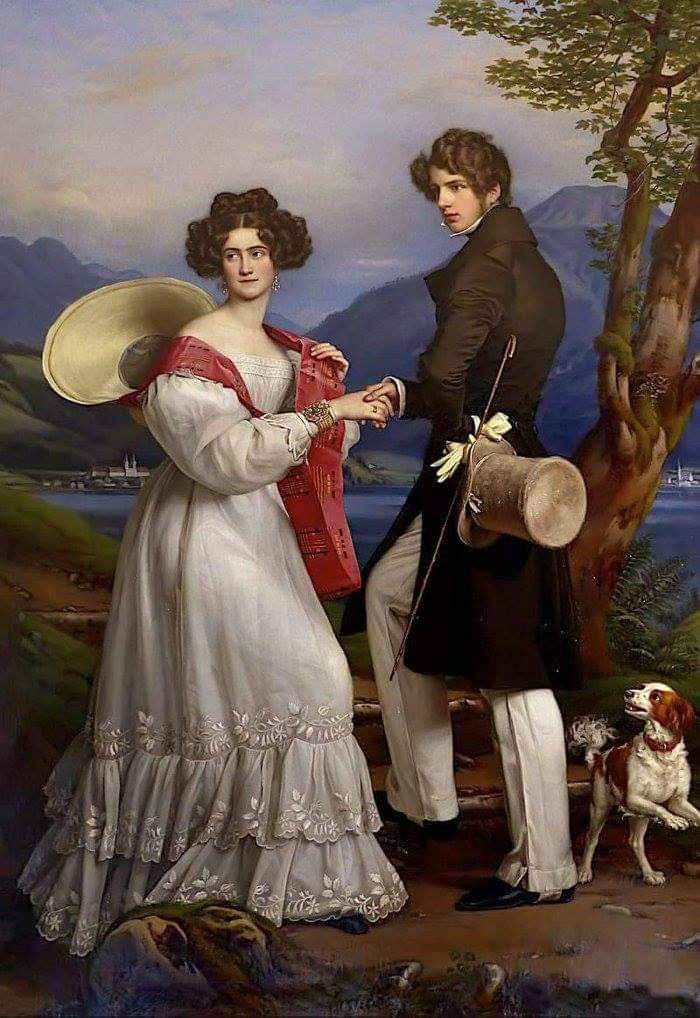
Portrait of Ludovika and Maximilian Joseph, 1828

Ludovika married Maximilian Joseph, Duke in Bavaria, whose father Duke Pius August in Bavaria was her cousin, on 9 September 1828 in Tegernsee. Ludovika was always frustrated that, unlike her elder sisters who married kings and Archdukes, she would not be marrying someone with a grand title, but rather a "peculiar" and "childish" duke who had a fondness for circuses. Ludovika was determined to create dynastic marriages for her daughters. According to her granddaughter:

The marriage of my grandparents was, like most of the family's matrimonial ventures, somewhat of a failure. [...] My grandparents walks unattended down the corridor which led to their bridal chamber, and my grandmother's aversion to her husband suddenly became so acute that she decided she could not and would not allow him to share her room that night. A happy thought seized her as they passed one of the half-open doors; the bride expressed some curiosity to know what was inside, so the bridegroom obligingly went to investigate, and, once inside, my grandmother locked him in, put the key in her pocket, and ran away. [...] After this black beginning of their married life, it is hardly surprising that my grandparents were not on the best of terms, and during the last years of their life, although they lived under the same roof, they rarely met.

She and her husband had ten children, including Empress Elisabeth of Austria and Queen Maria Sofia of the Two Sicilies.

Maximilian was mostly away from home; due to this, Ludovika wrote that she spent their first wedding anniversary alone and wept. In 1830, Ludovika found herself pregnant with their first child. On 21 June 1831, she gave birth to a son whom they named Ludwig Wilhelm.

== Issue ==
She had a total of 10 children.

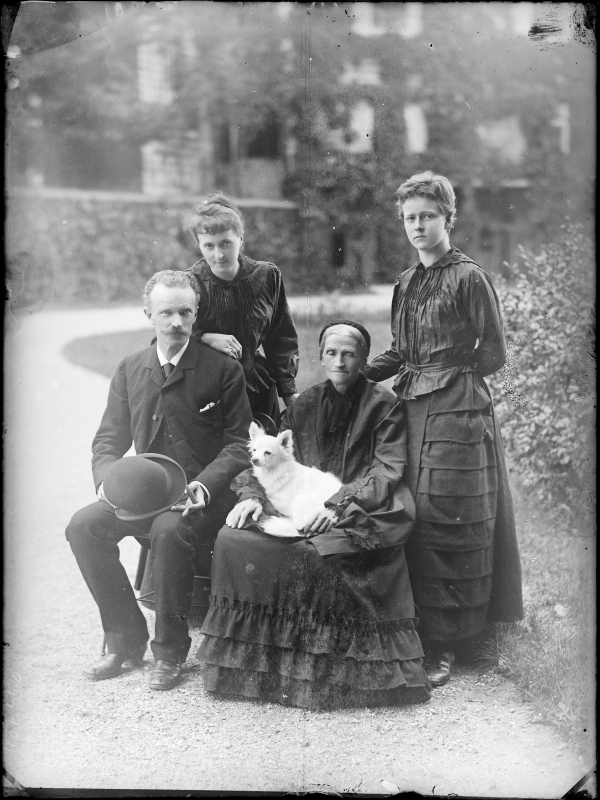
Princess Ludovika with her family in 1890

Children	Birth	Death	Notes
Ludwig Wilhelm, Duke in Bavaria	21 June 1831	6 November 1920 (aged 89)	Married Henriette, Freiin von Wallersee (morganatically) on 28 May 1859. They had two children.
Wilhelm Karl, Duke in Bavaria	24 December 1832	13 February 1833 (aged 0)	Died in infancy at seven weeks old.
Helene Caroline Therese, Duchess in Bavaria	4 April 1834	16 May 1890 (aged 56)	Nicknamed "Néné". Married Maximilian Anton Lamoral, Hereditary Prince of Thurn and Taxis on 24 August 1858. They had four children.
Elisabeth Amalie Eugenie, Duchess in Bavaria	24 December 1837	10 September 1898 (aged 60)	Nicknamed "Sisi". Married Franz Joseph I of Austria on 24 April 1854. They had four children.
Karl Theodor, Duke in Bavaria	9 August 1839	30 November 1909 (aged 70)	Married Sophie of Saxony on 11 February 1865. They had one daughter. Karl Theodor remarried Maria Josepha of Portugal on 29 April 1874. They had five children.
Marie Sophie Amalie, Duchess in Bavaria	4 October 1841	19 January 1925 (aged 83)	Married Francis II of the Two Sicilies on 3 February 1859. They had one daughter.
Mathilde Ludovika, Duchess in Bavaria	30 September 1843	18 June 1925 (aged 81)	Married Lodovico, Count of Trani on 5 June 1861. They had one daughter.
Maximilian, Duke in Bavaria	8 December 1845	8 December 1845 (aged 0)	Stillborn.
Sophie Charlotte Augustine, Duchess in Bavaria	23 February 1847	4 May 1897 (aged 50)	Married Ferdinand Philippe Marie, duc d'Alençon on 28 September 1868. They had two children.
Duke Maximilian Emanuel in Bavaria	7 December 1849	12 June 1893 (aged 43)	Married Princess Amalie of Saxe-Coburg and Gotha on 20 September 1875. They had three sons.

== Ancestry ==
Ancestors of Princess Ludovika of Bavaria

8. Christian III, Count Palatine of Zweibrücken
4. Frederick Michael, Count Palatine of Zweibrücken
9. Countess Caroline of Nassau-Saarbrücken
2. Maximilian I Joseph of Bavaria
10. Joseph Charles, Hereditary Prince of Sulzbach
5. Countess Palatine Maria Franziska of Sulzbach
11. Countess Palatine Elisabeth Auguste Sofie of Neuburg
1. Princess Ludovika of Bavaria
12. Charles Frederick, Grand Duke of Baden
6. Charles Louis, Hereditary Prince of Baden
13. Princess Caroline Louise of Hesse-Darmstadt
3. Princess Caroline of Baden
14. Louis IX, Landgrave of Hesse-Darmstadt
7. Princess Amalie of Hesse-Darmstadt
15. Countess Palatine Caroline of Zweibrücken
