= List of queens consort of the Two Sicilies =

The following is a list of queens consort of the Two Sicilies.

== Queen consort of the Two Sicilies ==
=== House of Bonaparte (Edict of Bayonne), 1806–1815 ===
Picture	Name	Father	Birth	Marriage	Became Consort	Ceased to be Consort	Death	Spouse
	Maria Annunziata Carolina Bonaparte	Carlo Maria Buonaparte (Bonaparte)	25 March 1782	20 January 1800	1 August 1808 husband's accession	3 May 1815 husband's deposition	18 May 1839	Joachim

Joachim Murat was the first king to rule a kingdom which was called "Two Sicilies" by the Edict of Bayonne, in 1808, though he controlled the mainland, he never physically controlled the island of Sicily which his Bourbon rival had fled from Naples to. After the Congress of Vienna, the title king of Two Sicilies was adopted by Ferdinand IV of Naples, in 1816. Under Ferdinand the Kingdom of Naples and the Kingdom of Sicily were unified, he had previously been king of both Naples and Sicily.

=== House of Bourbon, 1815–1861 ===
Picture	Name	Father	Birth	Marriage	Became Consort	Ceased to be Consort	Death	Spouse
	María Isabella of Spain	Charles IV of Spain (Bourbon-Spain)	6 July 1789	6 July 1802	4 January 1825 husband's accession	8 November 1830 husband's death	13 September 1848	Francis I
	Maria Cristina of Savoy	Victor Emmanuel I of Sardinia (Savoy)	14 November 1812	21 November 1832		21 January 1836		Ferdinand II
	Maria Theresa of Austria	Archduke Charles, Duke of Teschen (Habsburg-Lorraine)	31 July 1816	27 January 1837		22 May 1859 husband's death	8 August 1867	Ferdinand II
	Maria Sophie of Bavaria	Maximilian Joseph, Duke in Bavaria (Wittelsbach)	4 October 1841	3 February 1859	22 May 1859 husband's accession	20 March 1861 husband's deposition	19 January 1925	Francis II

In 1861 Two Sicilies became part of the newly founded Kingdom of Italy

== See also ==
- List of monarchs of the Two Sicilies
- House of Bourbon-Two Sicilies
- Duchess of Calabria
- List of Neapolitan consorts
- List of Sicilian consorts
- List of Italian consorts
- List of Sardinian consorts
- Royal Consorts of Spain
- List of Tuscan consorts
