= Queen Maria Christina =

Queen Maria Christina or Queen Maria Cristina may refer to:

- Maria Cristina of Naples and Sicily (1779–1849), wife of King Charles Felix of Sardinia
- Maria Christina of the Two Sicilies (1806–1878), wife of King Ferdinand VII of Spain
- Maria Cristina of Savoy (1812–1836), wife of King Ferdinand II of the Two Sicilies
- Maria Christina of Austria (1858–1929), wife of King Alfonso XII of Spain
