= Archduchess Theresa of Austria =

Archduchess Theresa of Austria may refer to:

- Archduchess Amalie Theresa of Austria (1807-1807), daughter of Francis II, Holy Roman Emperor and Maria Teresa of the Two Sicilies
- Archduchess Maria Theresa of Austria (1717-1780), Holy Roman Empress
- Archduchess Maria Theresa of Austria (1816-1867), Queen Consort of the Two Sicilies
