= Princess Maria Luisa of the Two Sicilies =

Countess of Bardi; youngest daughter of Ferdinand II

Princess Maria Luisa
- Countess of Bardi
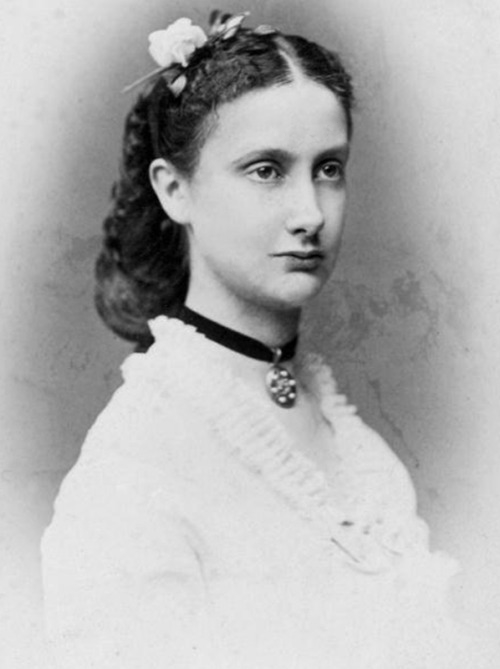
- Maria Luisa in 1872
- Born: 21 January 1855; Naples, Two Sicilies
- Died: 23 August 1874 (aged 19); Pau, Pyrénées-Atlantiques, France
- Spouse: Prince Henry of Bourbon-Parma, Count of Bardi (m. 1873)
Names
- Maria Luisa Immacolata di Borbone delle Due Sicilie
- House: Bourbon-Two Sicilies
- Father: Ferdinand II of the Two Sicilies
- Mother: Archduchess Maria Theresa of Austria

Princess Maria Luisa of the Two Sicilies (full Italian name: Maria Luisa Immacolata di Borbone, Principessa di Borbone delle Due Sicilie) (21 January 1855, Naples, Two Sicilies – 23 August 1874, Pau, Armagnac, France) was the youngest daughter of King Ferdinand II of the Two Sicilies and his wife Archduchess Maria Theresa of Austria. She was known for her piety and for her charity to the poor.

== Early life ==
Maria Luisa was born at the Palace of Caserta. She was baptised with the names Maria Luisa Immacolata; her godmother was Princess Maria Luisa Carlota of Parma. Her father died when she was only four years old and she was raised primarily by her mother.

In 1860, when Maria Luisa was five, her half-brother King Francis II of the Two Sicilies was defeated by the Expedition of the Thousand. She and her family fled to Rome where they resided briefly at the Quirinal Palace at the invitation of the Pope Pius IX. Her mother rented the Palazzo Nipoti in Rome, and it was there that she lived for the next seven years.

Even as a child Maria Luisa was known for her piety. She was particularly devoted to her namesake patrons, the Immaculate Heart of Mary and Saint Aloysius Gonzaga. On 24 December 1865, she made her first communion in the chapel in the Roman College where Saint Aloysius made his vows.

In the summer of 1867 Maria Luisa and her family were vacationing at Albano Laziale when cholera broke out. Her mother died on 8 August, followed by her youngest brother Gennaro on 13 August.

Following their mother's death, Maria Luisa and her siblings moved into the Palazzo Farnese, the residence of her half-brother King Francis II. She was taught Italian, French, and German. She became a competent artist in both oil and watercolour.

In October 1867 Rome was attacked by the forces of Giuseppe Garibaldi. Maria Luisa and her sister Maria Pia were given refuge in the Apostolic Palace in Vatican City until the papal victory at the Battle of Mentana.

In 1870 Rome was again attacked by the armies of the King of Italy. Maria Luisa and her sister Maria Pia fled to Bolzano and then to Cannes in France.

== Marriage ==
On 25 November 1873 in Cannes, Maria Luisa married Prince Henry of Bourbon-Parma, Count of Bardi, son of Charles III, Duke of Parma and his wife Princess Louise Marie Thérèse of France. Henry's older brother Robert had married Maria Luisa's older sister Maria Pia in 1869.

After the wedding Henry and Maria Luisa went to Egypt for their honeymoon. There she became sick with a fever. The couple decided to return home, and on 30 March 1874 they disembarked at Marseille.

== Death ==
It was decided to take Maria Luisa to the town of Cauterets where there were sulphur baths. On the way they stopped at the Sanctuary of Our Lady of Lourdes where she was immersed in the water twice. Her physicians said that her case was hopeless, and at the end of July it was decided to move her to Pau. She died there on 23 August, the Feast of the Immaculate Heart of Mary.

Maria Luisa's remains were buried in the chapel at Villa Borbone, near Viareggio.

== Ancestry ==
Ancestors of Princess Maria Luisa of the Two Sicilies

8. Ferdinand I of the Two Sicilies
4. Francis I of the Two Sicilies
9. Archduchess Maria Carolina of Austria
2. Ferdinand II of the Two Sicilies
10. Charles IV of Spain
5. Infanta María Isabel of Spain
11. Princess Maria Luisa of Parma
1. Princess Maria Luisa of Bourbon-Two Sicilies
12. Leopold II, Holy Roman Emperor
6. Archduke Charles, Duke of Teschen
13. Infanta Maria Luisa of Spain
3. Archduchess Maria Theresa of Austria
14. Frederick William, Prince of Nassau-Weilburg
7. Princess Henrietta of Nassau-Weilburg
15. Burgravine Louise Isabelle of Kirchberg
