= Maria Sophie of Bavaria =

Queen of the Two Sicilies from 1859 to 1861

Maria Sophie
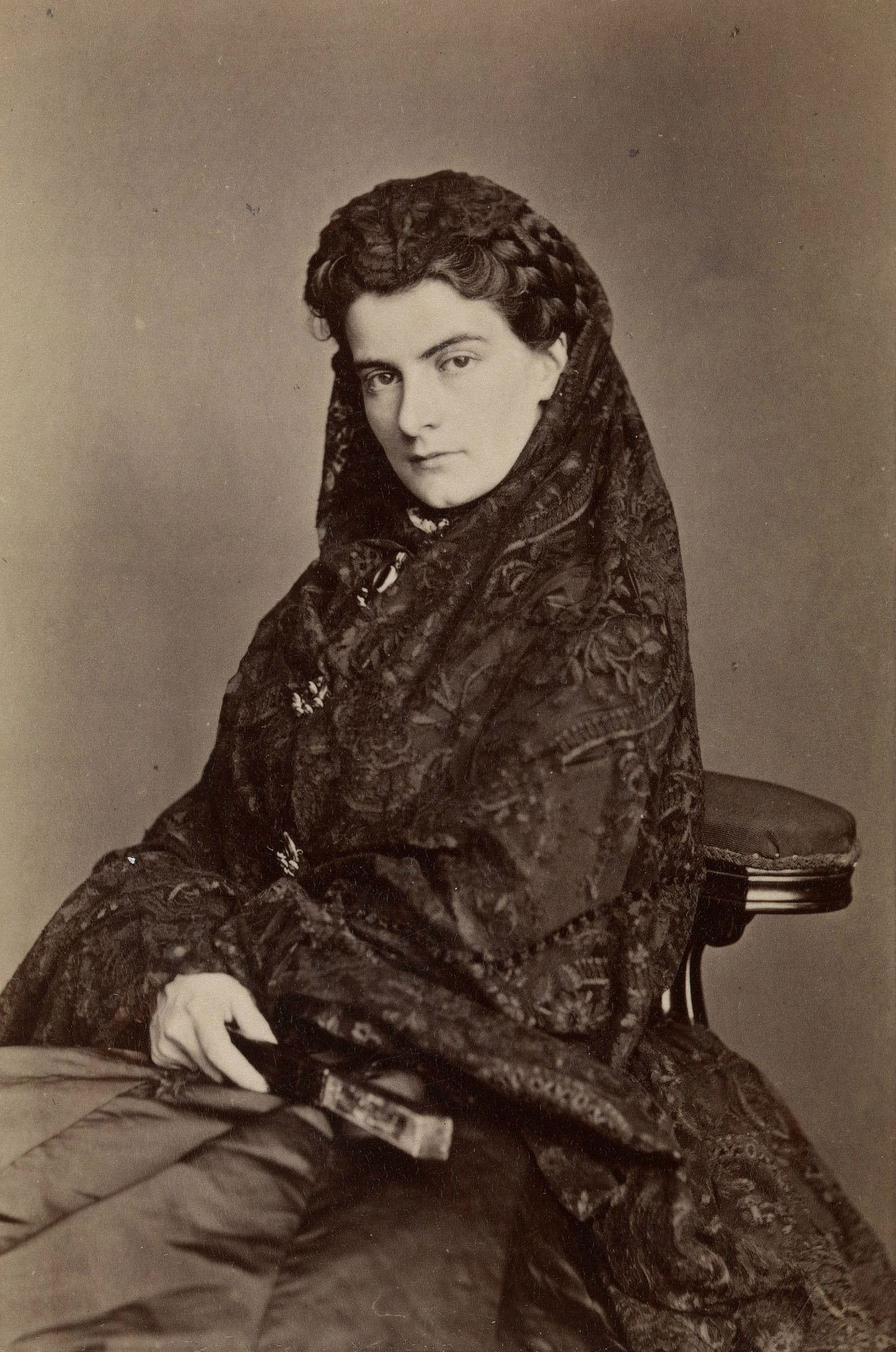
- 1875 portrait

Queen consort of the Two Sicilies
- Tenure: 22 May 1859 – 20 March 1861
- Born: 4 October 1841; Possenhofen Castle, Possenhofen, Kingdom of Bavaria
- Died: 19 January 1925 (aged 83); Munich, Bavaria, Weimar Republic
- Burial: Santa Chiara, Naples
- Spouse: Francis II of the Two Sicilies (m. 1859; died 1894)
- Issue: Princess Maria Cristina Pia of Bourbon-Two Sicilies; Mathilde (Daisy) de Lavaÿsse (illeg.)
- House: Wittelsbach
- Father: Duke Maximilian Joseph in Bavaria
- Mother: Princess Ludovika of Bavaria
- Coat of arms Queen Maria Sophie of the Two Sicilies

Maria Sophie of Bavaria (Maria Sophie Amalie; Italian: Maria Sofia; 4 October 1841 – 19 January 1925) was the last Queen of the Two Sicilies as the wife of Francis II of the Two Sicilies. She was one of the ten children of Maximilian Joseph, Duke in Bavaria and Princess Ludovika of Bavaria. She was born as Duchess Maria Sophie in Bavaria. She was the younger sister of the better-known Elisabeth of Bavaria ("Sisi") who married Emperor Franz Joseph I of Austria.

== Early life ==
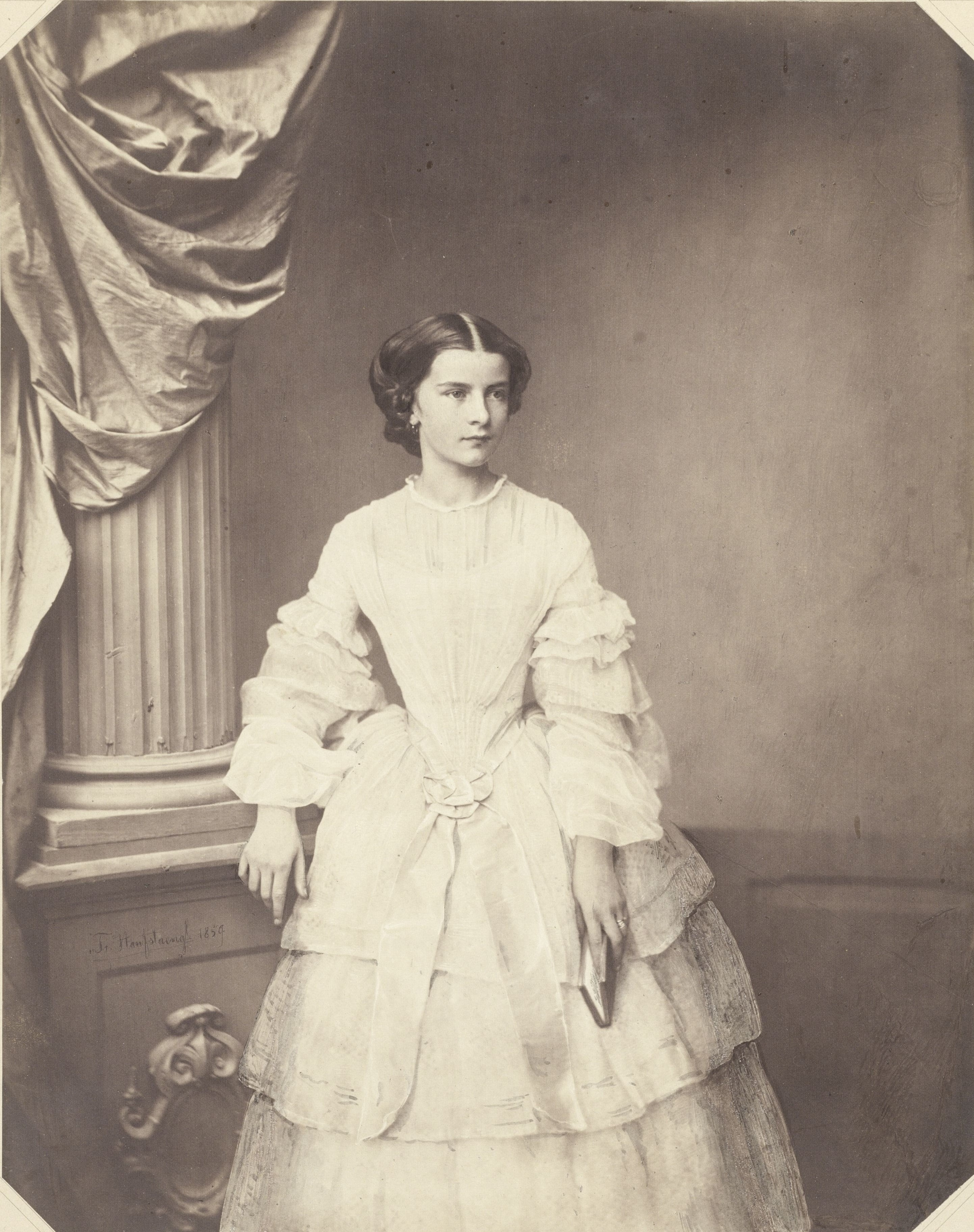
Maria Sophie, 1859

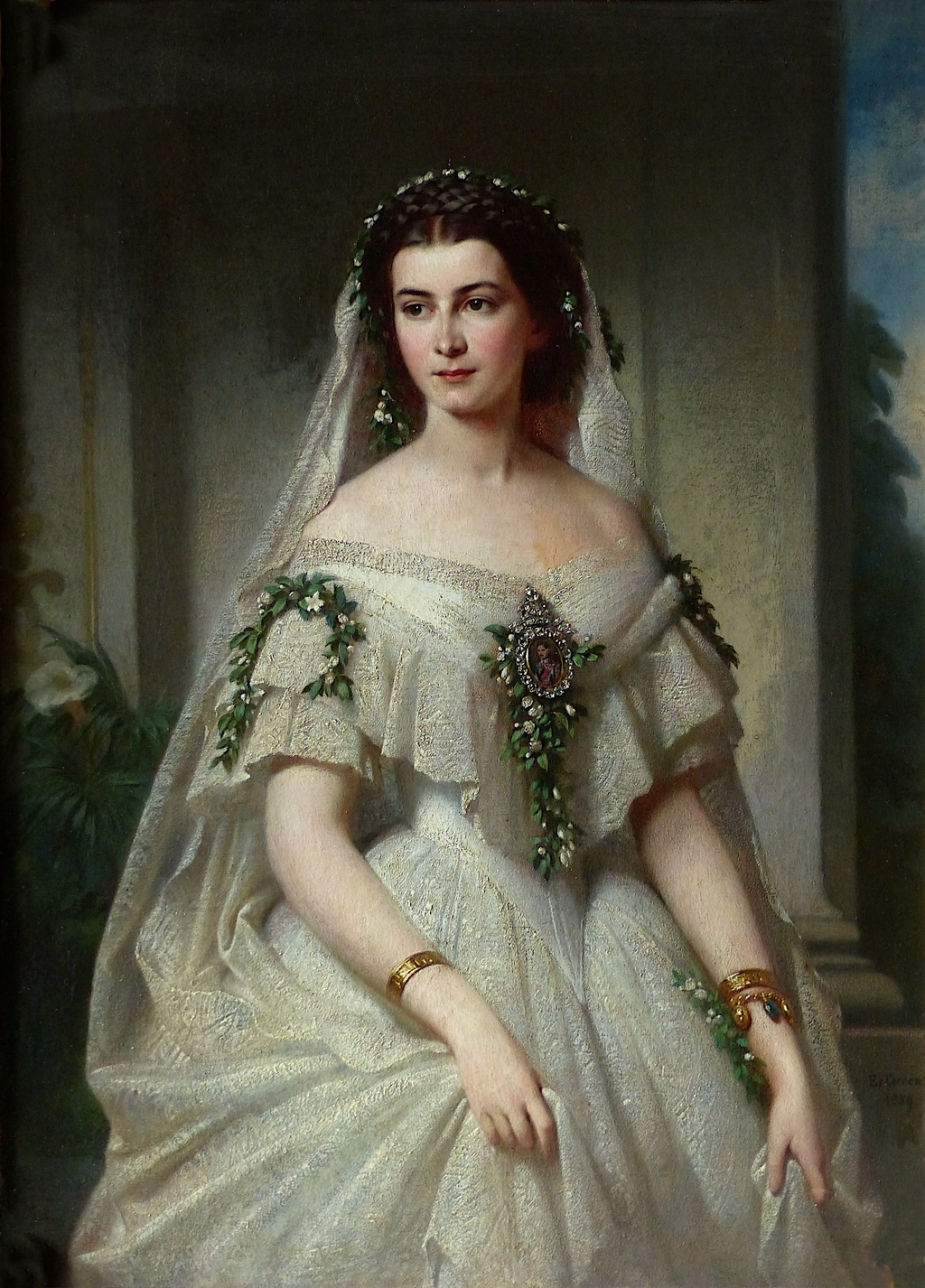
The last Queen consort of the Two Sicilies, 1859

Maria Sophie was born on October 4, 1841, at the Possenhofen Castle in Possenhofen, the Kingdom of Bavaria. Her parents were Duke Maximilian Joseph in Bavaria and Princess Ludovika of Bavaria. She was the sixth of ten children and one of the eight that survived to adulthood and in her family, she is often called "Mimi". She and her siblings enjoyed an unrestricted childhood, shared between Possenhofen Castle in the summers and the Herzog-Max-Palais in Munich.

In the winter of 1857, at the age of 16, Maria Sophie's hand was sought by Francis II of the Two Sicilies, the eldest son of King Ferdinand II of the Two Sicilies. The marriage was political, since Ferdinand wished to ally himself with the Emperor of Austria, Franz Josef I, a powerful fellow absolutist. At that time the kingdom was already threatened by revolutionary forces.

Maria Sophie had not experienced menarche, and underwent treatments to induce menses. She also had to learn Italian. She was married by proxy. In January 1859 she traveled to Vienna to spend time with her sister before they went to Trieste to formally enter her new kingdom, and say farewell to her family on the Neapolitan royal yacht Fulminante. She set sail for Bari and on 3 February 1859 was married there.

== Reign ==
Within the year, with the death of the king, her husband ascended to the throne as Francis II of the Two Sicilies, and Maria Sophie became queen of a realm that was shortly to be overwhelmed by the forces of Giuseppe Garibaldi and the Piedmontese army.

In September 1860, as the Garibaldine troops were moving towards Naples, his capital, Francis II decided to leave the city. At the beginning, he planned to organise a resistance in Capua. However, after that city had also been lost to the Garibaldines in the aftermath of the Battle of the Volturnus, he and Maria Sophie took refuge in the strong coastal fortress of Gaeta, 80 km north of Naples.

During the Siege of Gaeta in late 1860 and early 1861, the forces of Victor Emmanuel II bombarded and eventually overcame the defenders. It was this brief "last stand of the Bourbons" that gained Maria Sophie the reputation of the strong "warrior queen" that stayed with her for the rest of her life. She was tireless in her efforts to rally the defenders, giving them her own food, caring for the wounded, and daring the attackers to come within range of the fortress cannon.

On 13 February 1861, the fortress capitulated, and thus the Kingdom of the Two Sicilies ceased to exist, effectively deposing Francis II and Maria Sophie.

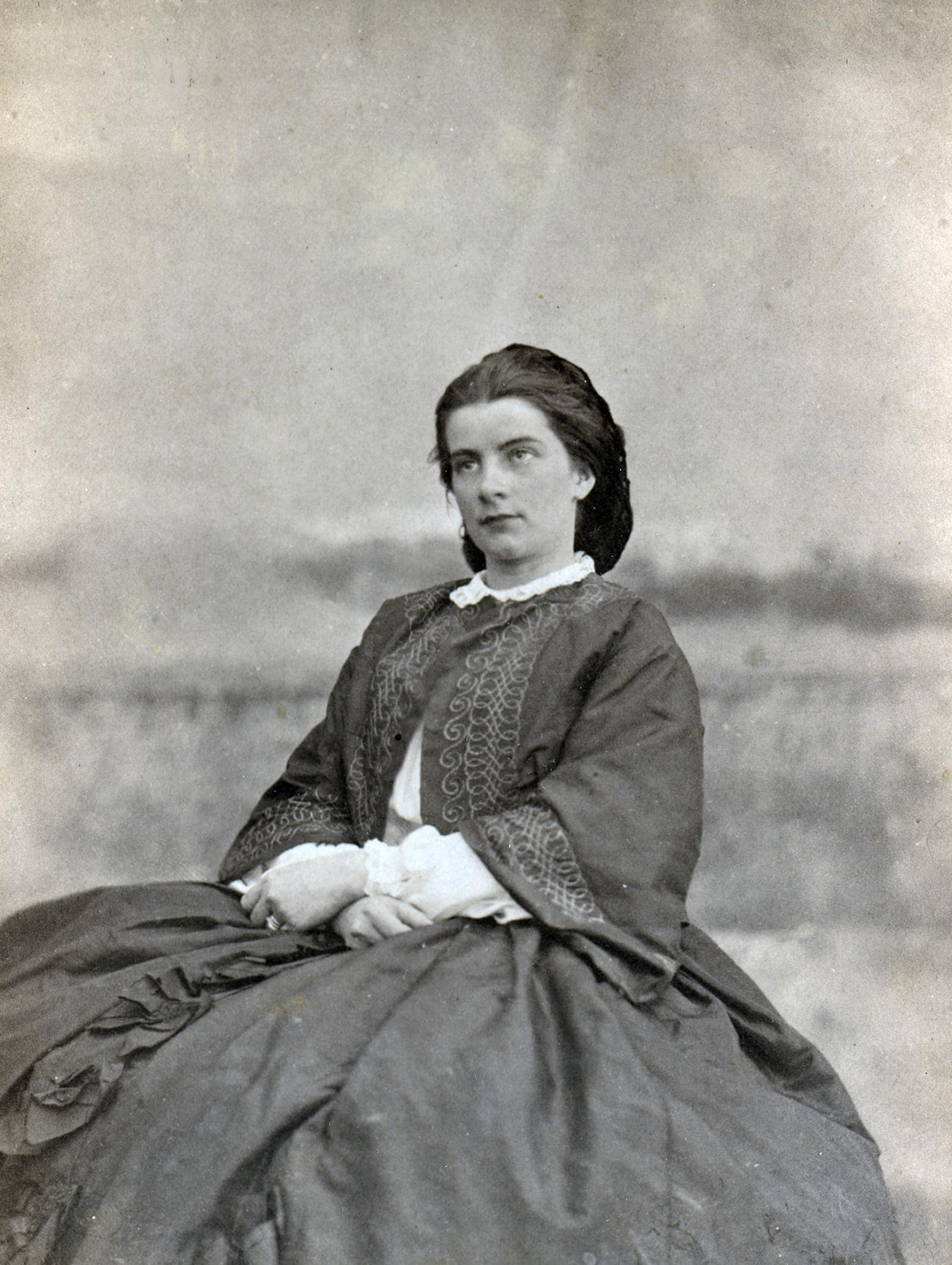
A rare close-up portrait of Maria Sophie – Queen of the Two Sicilies, 1860s

== Life in Rome ==
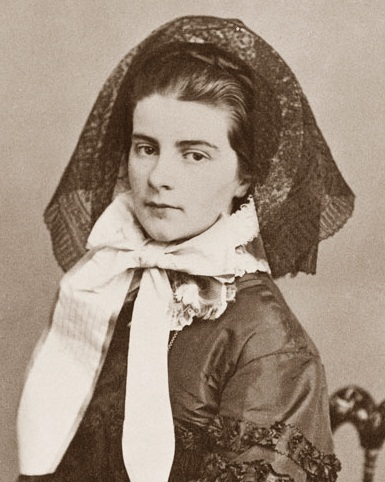
Maria Sophie, 1861

With the fall of Gaeta and the Kingdom of the Two Sicilies, Maria Sophie and her husband went into exile in Rome, the capital of what for 1,000 years had been the sizeable Papal States, a large piece of central Italy but which, by 1860, had been reduced to the city of Rome, itself, as the armies of Victor Emanuel II came down from the north to join up with Garibaldi, the conqueror of the south. King Francis set up a government in exile in Rome that enjoyed diplomatic recognition by most European states for a few years as still the legitimate government of the Kingdom of the Two Sicilies.

Her wealth and privilege were, to a certain extent, overshadowed by personal tragedies. Her marriage was not consummated for many years, as her husband suffered from phimosis. While in exile in Rome, rumours were spreading that the ex-queen had become pregnant with an illegitimate child and that - in order to avoid a public scandal - she gave health reasons to urgently visit her parents' house in Possenhofen; furthermore, it was decided, in a family council, that Maria Sophia should retire to the Ursuline Convent in Augsburg, where on 24 November, 1862, she gave birth to a daughter. The daughter, who was named Mathilde Marie Sophie Henriette Elisabeth Louise, was immediately given to foster parents, the Count and Countess de Gineste, who raised her at the Château de Garrevaques in Tarn. Maria Sophie was said to be able to keep in touch with her daughter until she died, in January 1886, and that the queen even attended her funeral in Paris. Countess Marie Larisch von Moennich, niece of Maria Sophie, had spread the story that the child's father was a Belgian officer of the papal guard named Count Armand de Lavaÿss. Although Countess Larisch's biographer Brigitte Sokop refuted this assertion and speculated that a possible father of the child would be the Spanish diplomat Salvador Bermúdez de Castro (later Duke of Ripalda and Santa Lucía), who was often to be seen in the company of the Neapolitan royal couple and who was also said to have had an affair (and also an illegitimate daughter) with Maria Sophie's sister Mathilde, Countess of Trani, a great-great-grandniece of the Ginestes, Lorraine Kaltenbach, took up this issue in a book published in 2021, but without providing any conclusive evidence for her sometimes bold claims. Lorraine Kaltenbach affirmed that the father of Maria Sophie's illegitimate daughter was a relative of hers, a nobleman called Félix-Emmanuel de Lavaÿsse, serving as a pontifical zouave, who officially recognized Daisy as his daughter on 16 May 1867 shortly before his death on 18 April 1868, aged 32. Kaltenbach relies mainly on oral statements from a deceased relative, which can no longer be verified, and cleverly constructs a plausible but speculative story that, despite numerous footnotes, she cannot substantiate with historical documents. The only historical evidence that can be verified is Marie's lung disease, as historian Astrid Mathyshek detailed in her biography published in 2025. According to this biography, although there was a German-French woman who had a friendly relationship with Marie Larisch, Queen Maria Sophie's niece, there is no evidence that the young woman had any kind of family relationship with Queen Maria Sophie or ever came into contact with her.

Afterwards, the relationship between the royal couple improved for a time. Francis submitted to an operation which allowed him to consummate the marriage, and Maria Sophie became pregnant. The couple was overjoyed at the turn of events and full of hope. On 24 December 1869, after ten years of marriage, Maria Sophie gave birth to a daughter, Maria Cristina Pia, who was born on the birthday of her aunt, Empress Elisabeth, who became her godmother. Unfortunately, the baby lived only three months and died on 28 March 1870. Maria Sophie and her husband never had another child.

== Later life ==
In 1870, Rome fell to the forces of Italy and the King and Queen fled to Bavaria. The king died in 1894. Maria Sophie spent time in Munich, and then moved to Paris where she presided over somewhat of an informal Bourbon court-in-exile. It was rumored she was involved in the anarchist assassination of King Humbert in 1900 in hopes of destabilizing the new nation-state of Italy. Recent historians have resurrected that rumor based on the apparent credence given to this conspiracy theory by the then Prime Minister of Italy, Giovanni Giolitti. Others regard it as anecdotal. In any event, the case against Maria Sophie is circumstantial.

During World War I, Maria Sophie was actively on the side of the German Empire and Austria-Hungary in their war with the Kingdom of Italy. Again, the rumors claimed she was involved in sabotage and espionage against Italy in the hope that an Italian defeat would tear the nation apart and that the kingdom of Naples would be restored.

During her life, she generated an almost cult-like air of admiration even among her political enemies. Gabriele d'Annunzio called her the "stern little Bavarian eagle" and Marcel Proust spoke of the "soldier queen on the ramparts of Gaeta". She and her sister Elisabeth were considered amongst the great beauties of their age.

Maria Sophie died in Munich in 1925. Since 1984 her remains now rest with those of her husband and their daughter in the Church of Santa Chiara in Naples.

== Issue ==
Name	Picture	Lifespan	Notes
Mathilde Marie Sophie Henriette Elisabeth Louise		24 November 1862 – January 1886	
Maria Cristina Pia Anna Isabella Natalia Elisa		24 December 1869 – 28 March 1870	Died aged 3 months.

== Ancestors ==
Ancestors of Maria Sophie of Bavaria

8. Duke Wilhelm in Bavaria
4. Duke Pius August in Bavaria
9. Countess Palatine Maria Anna of Zweibrücken-Birkenfeld
2. Duke Maximilian Joseph in Bavaria
10. Prince Louis of Arenberg
5. Princess Amélie Louise of Arenberg
11. Marie Adélaïde Julie de Mailly-Nesle
1. Maria Sophie in Bavaria
12. Frederick Michael, Count Palatine of Zweibrücken
6. Maximilian I Joseph of Bavaria
13. Countess Palatine Maria Franziska of Sulzbach
3. Princess Ludovika of Bavaria
14. Charles Louis, Hereditary Prince of Baden
7. Princess Caroline of Baden
15. Princess Amalie of Hesse-Darmstadt

== Sources ==
This item originated as an abridged and edited version of an article that appears in an online encyclopedia of Naples and has been inserted here by the author and copyright holder of that article.

=== Bibliography ===
- Alio, Jacqueline (2018). Queens of Sicily 1061–1266. Sicilian Medieval Studies. New York: Trinacria. ISBN 978-1-943-63914-4.
- Bestenreiner, Erika (2003). Sisi und ihre Geschwister [Sisi and her siblings] (in German) (2nd ed.). Munich: Piper. ISBN 3-492-24006-2.
- Graf, Bernhard (2017). Sisis Geschwister [Sisi's siblings] (in German). Munich: Allitera. ISBN 978-3-86906-977-7.
- Hamann, Brigitte (1986). The Reluctant Empress: A Biography of Empress Elisabeth of Austria. New York: Alfred A. Knopf. ISBN 0-394-53717-3.
- Küchler, Carl (1910). Queen Maria Sophia of Naples, A Forgotten Heroine (Hardback). Life Stories for Young People. Translated by Upton, George P. Chicago: A. C. McClurg.
- Kaltenbach, Lorraine (2021). Le secret de la reine soldat: L'extraordinaire soeur de Sissi (in French). Monaco: Éditions du Rocher. ISBN 978-2268104829.
- Sokop, Brigitte (1985). Jene Gräfin Larisch: Marie Louise Gräfin Larisch-Wallersee, Vertraute der Kaiserin – Verfemte nach Mayerling (4th ed.). Vienna: Böhlau. ISBN 3-205-07231-6.
- Tschudi, Clara (1905). Maria Sophia, Queen of Naples: A Continuation of "The Empress Elizabeth". Translated by Hearn, Ethel Harriet. London: Swan Sonnenschein. OCLC 838411.
- Van der Kiste, John (2019). The Heroine of Gaeta: Queen Maria Sophia of the Two Sicilies. Independently Published. ISBN 978-1798944387.
- von Witzleben, Hermann; von Vignau, Ilka (1976). Die Herzöge in Bayern. Von der Pfalz zum Tegernsee [The dukes in Bavaria. From the Palatinate to Tegernsee] (in German). Munich. ISBN 3-7913-0394-5.

Maria Sophie of Bavaria House of Wittelsbach Born: 4 October 1841 Died: 19 January 1925
Regnal titles
Preceded by Maria Theresa of Austria	Queen consort of the Two Sicilies; 22 May 1859 – 20 March 1861	Kingdom disbanded
Titles in pretence
Kingdom disbanded	— TITULAR — Queen consort of the Two Sicilies; 20 March 1861 – 27 December 1894	Succeeded by Maria Antoinetta of Bourbon-Two Sicilies
