= Prince Januarius, Count of Caltagirone =

Prince of the Two Sicilies; youngest son of Ferdinand II

Prince Januarius
- Count of Caltagirone
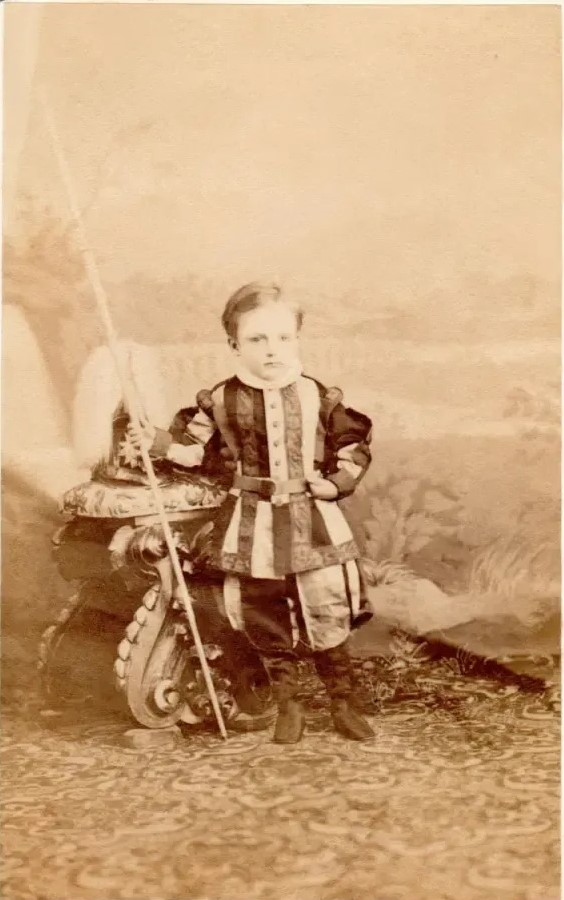
- Prince Januarius c. 1859
- Born: 28 February 1857; Caserta Palace, Caserta, Two Sicilies
- Died: 13 August 1867 (aged 10); Albano Laziale, Papal States
- Burial: Basilica of Santa Chiara, Naples
Names
- Italian: Gennaro Maria Immacolata Luigi; English: Januarius Maria Immaculata Louis
- House: Bourbon-Two Sicilies
- Father: Ferdinand II of the Two Sicilies
- Mother: Maria Theresa of Austria

Prince Januarius Maria Immaculata Louis of Bourbon-Two Sicilies, Count of Caltagirone (Italian: Gennaro Maria Immacolata Luigi, Principe di Borbone delle Due Sicilie, Conte di Caltagirone) (28 February 1857 – 13 August 1867) was the twelfth and youngest child of Ferdinand II of the Two Sicilies and Maria Theresa of Austria. He was a member of the House of Bourbon-Two Sicilies. The prince was named after Saint Januarius (Italian: San Gennaro), patron saint of Naples.

== Life ==
Januarius was born in the Caserta Palace, two years before the death of his father Ferdinand II, the penultimate King of the Two Sicilies. At the time of the Prince's birth, Ferdinand was already ill and too weak to play with his youngest son as he had done with his previous eleven children. The young Prince would never know of the carefree experience of growing up in the opulence of the Neapolitan court.

In 1860, the Royal Family of the Two Sicilies was driven from Naples and from the kingdom by Giuseppe Garibaldi and his Expedition of the Thousand. Garibaldi and his troops deprived Januarius and his family of their properties and wealth forcing the family and their descendants into a financially strained and nomadic existence. Pope Pius IX offered the family a residence at Quirinal Palace in Rome as gratitude for their loyalty.

In 1867, a cholera epidemic forced the population, or at least those who could, to leave the capital. Januarius's mother Maria Theresa took the children who still lived with her at Quirinal Palace and moved them over the Alban Hills to Albano Laziale. Despite his mother's efforts to spare her children from illness, the small Januarius contracted cholera. Januarius died almost immediately. Maria Theresa was also infected and died after atrocious suffering, having refused treatment from a doctor whom she considered to be "liberal."

== Ancestry ==
Ancestors of Prince Januarius, Count of Caltagirone

8. Ferdinand I of the Two Sicilies
4. Francis I of the Two Sicilies
9. Archduchess Maria Carolina of Austria
2. Ferdinand II of the Two Sicilies
10. Charles IV of Spain
5. Infanta Maria Isabella of Spain
11. Princess Maria Luisa of Parma
1. Prince Januarius, Count of Caltagirone
12. Leopold II, Holy Roman Emperor
6. Archduke Charles, Duke of Teschen
13. Infanta Maria Louisa of Spain
3. Archduchess Maria Theresa of Austria
14. Frederick William, Prince of Nassau-Weilburg
7. Princess Henrietta of Nassau-Weilburg
15. Burgravine Louise Isabelle of Kirchberg
