= Prince Pasquale, Count of Bari =

Prince of the Two Sicilies; eighth son of Ferdinand II

Prince Pasquale
- Count of Bari
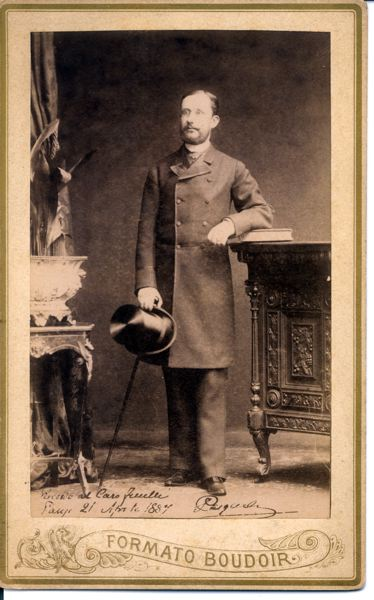
- Prince Pasquale in 1889
- Born: 15 September 1852; Caserta Palace, Caserta, Two Sicilies
- Died: 21 December 1904 (aged 52); Château de Malmaison, Rueil-Malmaison, France
- Spouse: Blanche de Marconnay (m. 1878)
Names
- Italian: Pasquale Baylen Maria del Carmine Giovanni-Battista Vincenzo-Ferreri Michele Arcangelo Francesco di Paola Ferdinando Francesco di Assisi Luigi-Re Alfonso Gaetano Giuseppe Pietro Paolo Gennaro Luigi-Gonzaga Giovanni Giuseppe della Croce Gaspare Melchiore Baldassare Alberto Sebastiano Giorgio Venanzio Emanuele Placido Andrea-Avelino Rocco Pacifico Francesco di Geronimo Felice Teziano Anna Filomena Sebazia Lucia Luitgarda Apollina
- House: Bourbon-Two Sicilies
- Father: Ferdinand II of the Two Sicilies
- Mother: Maria Theresa of Austria

Prince Pasquale of Bourbon-Two Sicilies, Count of Bari, (full Italian name: Pasquale Baylen Maria del Carmine Giovanni-Battista Vincenzo-Ferreri Michele Arcangelo Francesco di Paola Ferdinando Francesco di Assisi Luigi-Re Alfonso Gaetano Giuseppe Pietro Paolo Gennaro Luigi-Gonzaga Giovanni Giuseppe della Croce Gaspare Melchiore Baldassare Alberto Sebastiano Giorgio Venanzio Emanuele Placido Andrea-Avelino Rocco Pacifico Francesco di Geronimo Felice Teziano Anna Filomena Sebazia Lucia Luitgarda Apollina, Principe di Borbone delle Due Sicilie, Conte di Bari) (15 September 1852, Caserta Palace, Caserta, Two Sicilies – 21 December 1904, Château de Malmaison, Rueil-Malmaison, France) was the eleventh child of Ferdinand II of the Two Sicilies and his second wife Maria Theresa of Austria.

== Early life ==
Pasquale was a cheerful and playful child, raised with loving care by his mother Maria Theresa. Ferdinand was also affectionate and involved with Pasquale and his siblings. Following the expulsion of the Bourbons from Naples and the Kingdom of the Two Sicilies, Pasquale followed his mother and brothers to Rome where Pope Pius IX hosted the Neapolitan Royal Family at the Quirinal Palace.

== Marriage ==
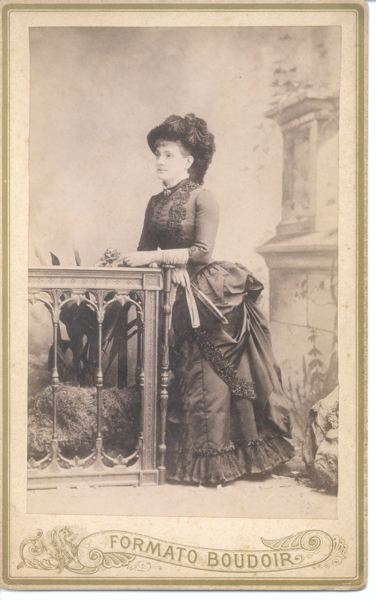
Blanche de Marconnay

Pasquale married morganatically to Blanche de Marconnay, natural daughter of Henriette de Marconnay, on 20 November 1878 in Clichy, Hauts-de-Seine.

== Ancestry ==
Ancestors of Prince Pasquale, Count of Bari

8. Ferdinand I of the Two Sicilies
4. Francis I of the Two Sicilies
9. Archduchess Maria Carolina of Austria
2. Ferdinand II of the Two Sicilies
10. Charles IV of Spain
5. Infanta Maria Isabella of Spain
11. Princess Maria Luisa of Parma
1. Prince Pasquale, Count of Bari
12. Leopold II, Holy Roman Emperor
6. Archduke Charles, Duke of Teschen
13. Infanta Maria Louisa of Spain
3. Archduchess Maria Theresa of Austria
14. Frederick William, Prince of Nassau-Weilburg
7. Princess Henrietta of Nassau-Weilburg
15. Burgravine Louise Isabelle of Kirchberg
