= Ferdinand II of the Two Sicilies =

King of the Two Sicilies from 1830 to 1859

Ferdinand II
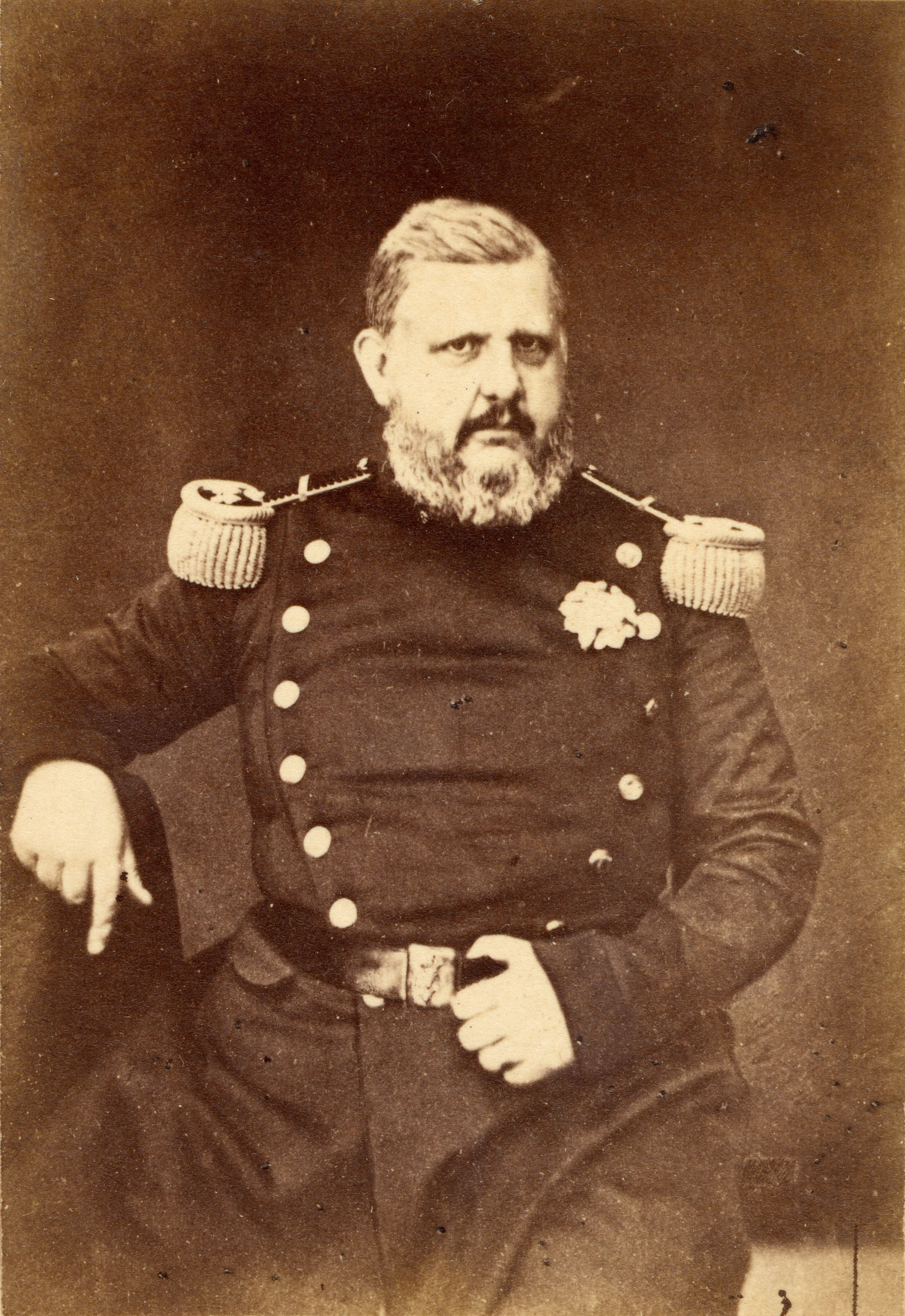
- Ferdinand in 1859

King of the Two Sicilies
- Reign: 8 November 1830 – 22 May 1859
- Predecessor: Francis I
- Successor: Francis II
- Born: 12 January 1810; Palazzo dei Normanni, Palermo, Kingdom of Sicily
- Died: 22 May 1859 (aged 49); Caserta Palace, Caserta, Kingdom of the Two Sicilies
- Burial: Basilica of Santa Chiara, Naples
- Spouse: Maria Cristina of Savoy (m. 1832; died 1836) Maria Theresa of Austria (m. 1837)
- Issue see details...: Francis II of the Two Sicilies; Prince Luigi, Count of Trani; Prince Alberto, Count of Castrogiovanni; Prince Alfonso, Count of Caserta; Maria Annunziata, Archduchess of Austria; Maria Immacolata, Archduchess of Austria; Prince Gaetano, Count of Girgenti; Prince Giuseppe, Count of Lucera; Maria Pia, Duchess of Parma; Prince Vincenzo, Count of Melazzo; Prince Pasquale, Count of Bari; Princess Maria Luisa, Countess of Bardi; Prince Gennaro, Count of Caltagirone
Names
- Italian: Ferdinando Carlo Maria
- House: Bourbon-Two Sicilies
- Father: Francis I of the Two Sicilies
- Mother: Maria Isabella of Spain
- Religion: Catholic Church

Ferdinand II (Italian: Ferdinando Carlo Maria; Sicilian: Ferdinannu Carlu Maria; Neapolitan: Ferdinando Carlo Maria; 12 January 1810 – 22 May 1859) was King of the Two Sicilies from 1830 until his death in 1859.

== Family ==
Ferdinand was born in Palermo to King Francis I of the Two Sicilies and his second wife Maria Isabella of Spain. His paternal grandparents were King Ferdinand I of the Two Sicilies and Queen Maria Carolina of Austria. His maternal grandparents were Charles IV of Spain and Maria Luisa of Parma. Ferdinand I and Charles IV were brothers, both sons of Charles III of Spain and Maria Amalia of Saxony. His sister was Teresa Cristina of the Two Sicilies, Empress of Brazil, wife of the last Brazilian emperor Pedro II.

== Early reign ==
In his early years, he was fairly popular. Progressives credited him with Liberal ideas and, in addition, his free and easy manners endeared him to the so-called lazzaroni, the lower classes of Neapolitan society.

On succeeding to the throne in 1830, he published an edict in which he promised to give his most anxious attention to the impartial administration of justice, to reform the finances, and to use every effort to heal the wounds which had afflicted the Kingdom for so many years. His goal, he said, was to govern his Kingdom in a way that would bring the greatest happiness to the greatest number of his subjects while respecting the rights of his fellow monarchs and those of the Roman Catholic Church.

The early years of his reign were comparatively peaceful: he cut taxes and expenditures, had the first railway in Italy built (between Naples and the royal palace at Portici), his fleet had the first steamship in the Italian Peninsula and he had telegraphic connections established between Naples and Palermo, Sicily.

However, in 1837, he violently suppressed Sicilian demonstrators demanding a constitution and maintained strict police surveillance in his domains. Liberal reformists, who were motivated by visions of a new society founded upon a modern constitution, continued to demand that the King grant a constitution and liberalize his rule.

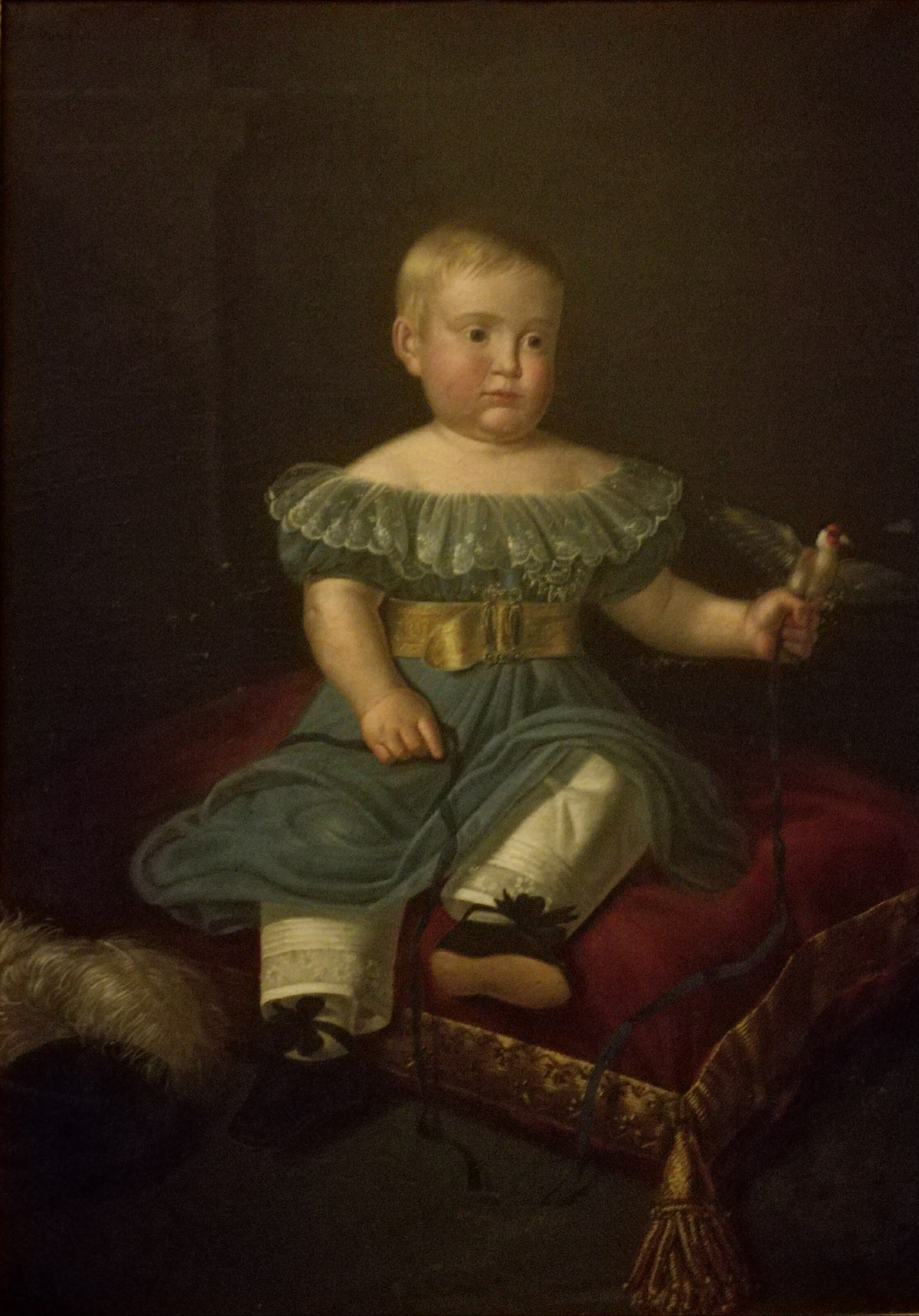
Portrait of Ferdinand II as a child, located in the Royal Palace of Caserta

== Revolutions of 1848 ==
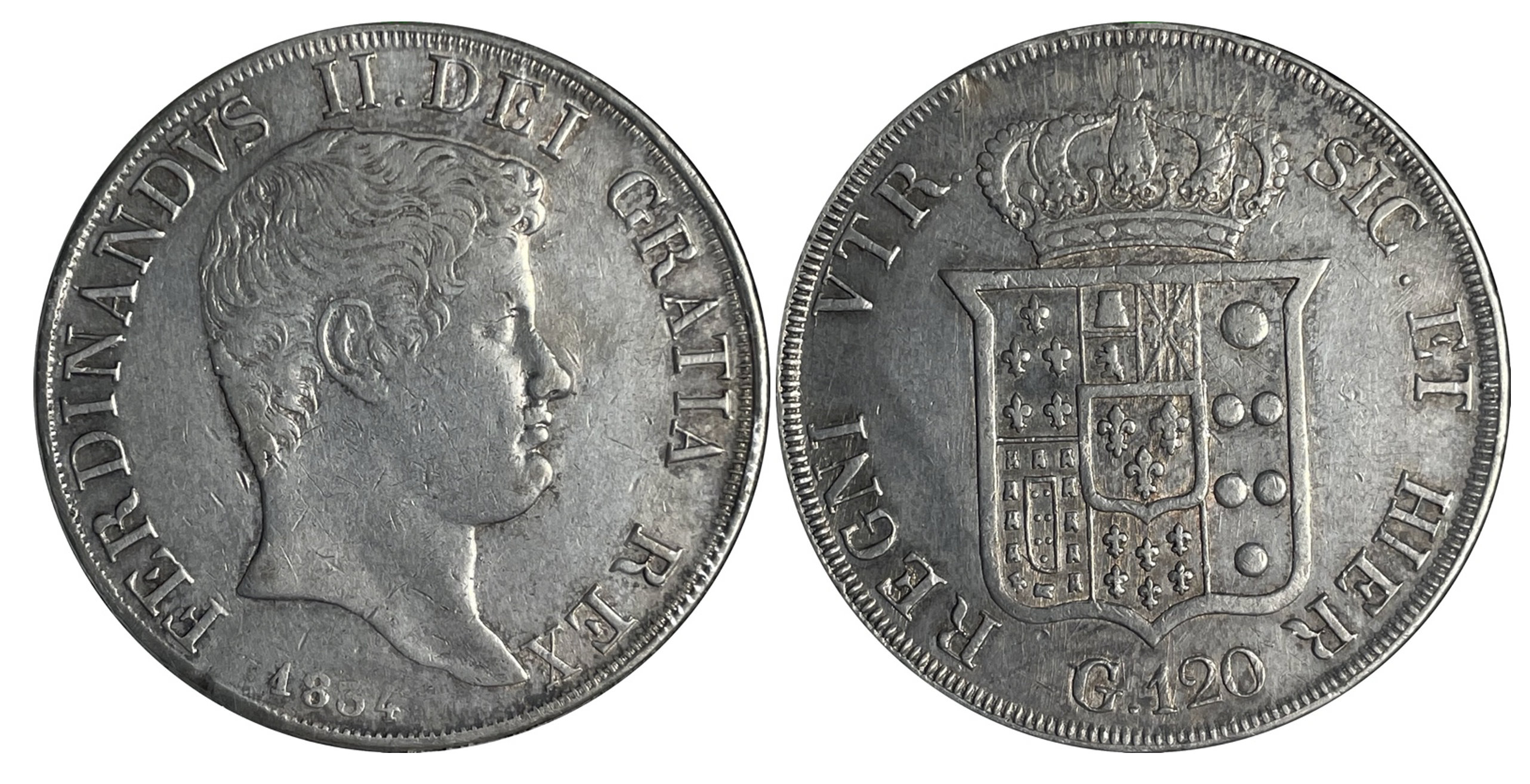
Silver coin: 120 grana Ferdinand II - 1834

In September 1847, violent riots inspired by Liberals broke out in Reggio Calabria and in Messina, which were put down by the military. On 12 January 1848 a rising in Palermo spread throughout the island of Sicily and served as a spark for the Revolutions of 1848 all over Europe.

After similar revolutionary outbursts in Salerno, south of Naples, and in the Cilento region which were backed by the majority of the intelligentsia of the Kingdom, on 29 January 1848 King Ferdinand was forced to grant a constitution, using for a pattern the French Charter of 1830.

However a dispute arose as to the nature of the oath which should be taken by the members of the chamber of deputies. As an agreement could not be reached and the King refused to compromise, riots continued in the streets. Eventually, the King ordered the army to disperse the rioters by force and dissolved the national parliament on 13 March 1849. Although the constitution was never formally abrogated, the King resumed his rule as an absolute monarch.

During this period, Ferdinand showed his attachment to Pope Pius IX by granting him asylum at Gaeta. The Pope had been temporarily forced to flee from Rome following similar revolutionary disturbances.

In the meantime, Sicily declared independence under the leadership of Ruggero Settimo, who on 13 April 1848 pronounced the King deposed. In response, the King assembled an army of 20,000 men under the command of General Carlo Filangieri and dispatched it to Sicily. A naval flotilla sent to Sicilian waters bombarded the city of Messina with "savage barbarity" for eight hours after its defenders had already surrendered, killing many civilians and earning the King the nickname re bomba ("The Bomb King").

After a campaign lasting close to nine months, Sicily's Liberal regime was completely subdued on 15 May 1849.

== Later reign ==
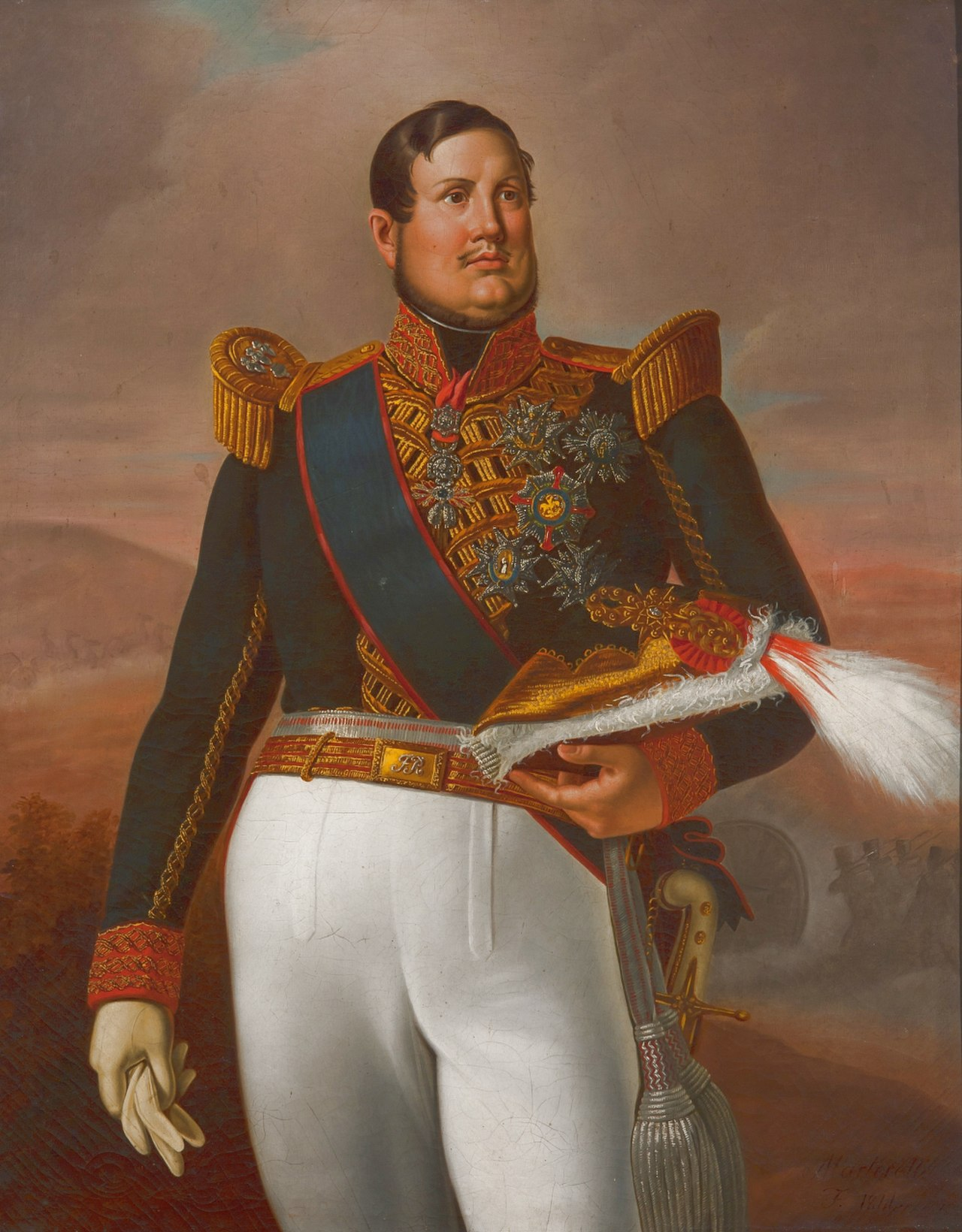
Portrait of Ferdinand by F. Martorell, 1844

Between 1848 and 1851, the policies of King Ferdinand caused many to go into exile. Meanwhile, an estimated 2,000 suspected revolutionaries or dissidents were jailed.

After visiting Naples on private business in 1850, William Gladstone the British former government minister and future prime minister, began to support Neapolitan opponents of the Bourbon rulers: his "support" consisted of a couple of letters that he sent from Naples to Parliament in London, describing the "awful conditions" of the Kingdom of Southern Italy and claiming that "it is the negation of God erected into a system of government". Gladstone's letters provoked reactions of outrage in much of Europe and helped to cause the kingdom's diplomatic isolation, which facilitated its subsequent invasion and annexation by the Savoyard Kingdom of Sardinia, and the foundation of modern unified Italy in 1861.

The British government, which had been the ally and protector of the Bourbon dynasty during the Napoleonic Wars, had already additional interests in limiting the independence of the kingdom. It had extensive business interests in Sicily and relied on Sicilian sulphur for certain industries. The King had endeavoured to limit British influence, which had begun to cause tension. As Ferdinand ignored the advice of the British and French governments, those powers recalled their ambassadors in 1856.

A soldier attempted to assassinate Ferdinand in 1856, and many believe that the infection he received from the soldier's bayonet led to his ultimate demise. He died on 22 May 1859, shortly after the Second French Empire and the Kingdom of Sardinia had declared war against the Austrian Empire. This would later lead to the invasion of his Kingdom by Giuseppe Garibaldi and Italian unification in 1861.

== Honours ==
- Two Sicilies:
  - Grand Master of the Order of St. Januarius
  - Grand Master of the Order of St. Ferdinand and Merit
  - Grand Master of the Sacred Military Constantinian Order of St. George
  - Grand Master of the Order of St. George of the Reunion
  - Grand Master of the Royal Order of Francis I
- Austrian Empire: Grand Cross of the Royal Hungarian Order of St. Stephen, 1832
- Baden:
  - Knight of the House Order of Fidelity, 1853
  - Grand Cross of the Zähringer Lion, 1853
- Kingdom of Bavaria: Knight of St. Hubert, 1832
- Belgium: Grand Cordon of the Order of Leopold, 11 March 1847
- Denmark: Knight of the Elephant, 4 August 1829
- Kingdom of France: Knight of the Holy Spirit, 1821
- Duchy of Parma: Grand Cross of St. Louis for Civil Merit, in Diamonds, 1851
- Kingdom of Prussia: Knight of the Black Eagle, 23 March 1832
- Kingdom of Sardinia: Knight of the Annunciation, 11 July 1829
- Spain: Knight of the Golden Fleece, 22 April 1821
- Grand Duchy of Tuscany: Grand Cross of St. Joseph

== Issue ==
Name	Birth	Death	Notes
By Princess Maria Cristina of Savoy (married 21 November 1832 in Cagliari; b. 12 November 1812, d. 21 January 1836)
Francesco II of the Two Sicilies	16 January 1836	27 December 1894	succeeded as King of the Two Sicilies married Duchess Maria Sophie in Bavaria. They had one daughter.
By Archduchess Maria Theresa of Austria (married 9 January 1837 in Vienna; b. 31 July 1816, d. 8 August 1867)
Luigi, Count of Trani	1 August 1838	8 June 1886	married Duchess Mathilde Ludovika in Bavaria; their only daughter, Princess Maria Teresa, married Prince Wilhelm of Hohenzollern-Sigmaringen.
Alberto, Count of Castrogiovanni	17 September 1839	12 July 1844	died in childhood.
Alfonso, Count of Caserta	28 March 1841	26 May 1934	married his first cousin Maria Antonia of the Two Sicilies. They had 12 children. The current lines of Bourbon-Sicily descend from him.
Maria Annunciata of the Two Sicilies	24 March 1843	4 May 1871	married Archduke Karl Ludwig of Austria. They had four children, including Archduke Franz Ferdinand, whose assassination sparked World War I.
Maria Immacolata Clementina of the Two Sicilies	14 April 1844	18 February 1899	married Archduke Karl Salvator of Austria. They had ten children.
Gaetano, Count of Girgenti	12 January 1846	26 November 1871	married Infanta Isabel of Spain (eldest daughter of Queen Isabella II of Spain) and was created Infante of Spain; no issue.
Giuseppe, Count of Lucera	4 March 1848	28 September 1851	died in childhood.
Maria Pia of the Two Sicilies	21 August 1849	29 September 1882	married Roberto I, Duke of Parma and Piacenza. They had 12 children.
Vincenzo, Count of Melazzo	26 April 1851	13 October 1854	died in childhood.
Pasquale, Count of Bari	15 September 1852	21 December 1904	married morganatically to Blanche Marconnay; no issue.
Maria Luisa of the Two Sicilies	21 January 1855	23 August 1874	married Prince Henry of Bourbon-Parma, Count of Bardi; no issue.
Gennaro, Count of Caltagirone	28 February 1857	13 August 1867	died in childhood.

== Ancestry ==
Ancestors of Ferdinand II of the Two Sicilies

8. Charles III of Spain (= 12)
4. Ferdinand I of the Two Sicilies
9. Maria Amalia of Saxony (= 13)
2. Francis I of the Two Sicilies
10. Francis I, Holy Roman Emperor
5. Maria Carolina of Austria
11. Maria Theresa of Austria
1. Ferdinand II of the Two Sicilies
12. Charles III of Spain (= 8)
6. Charles IV of Spain
13. Maria Amalia of Saxony (= 9)
3. Maria Isabella of Spain
14. Philip, Duke of Parma
7. Maria Luisa of Parma
15. Louise Élisabeth of France

== See also ==
- Naples–Portici railway line

== Notes ==
Ferdinand II of the Two Sicilies House of Bourbon-Two Sicilies Cadet branch of the House of Bourbon Born: 12 January 1810 Died: 22 May 1859
Regnal titles
Preceded by Francis I	King of the Two Sicilies; 8 November 1830 – 22 May 1859	Succeeded by Francis II
