= Maria Theresa of Austria, Queen of the Two Sicilies =

Queen of the Two Sicilies from 1837 to 1859

Maria Theresa of Austria
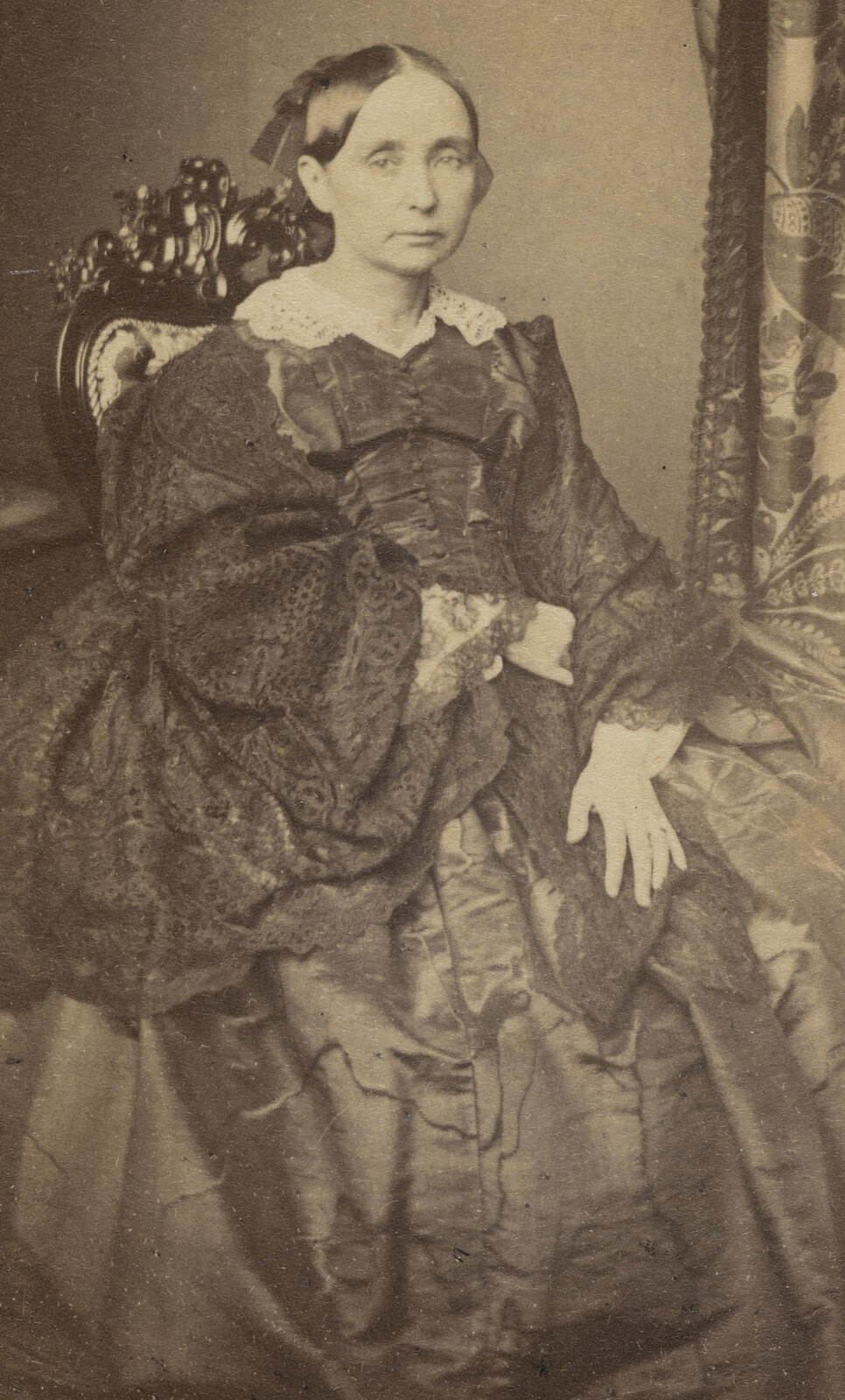
- Maria Theresa in 1862

Queen consort of the Two Sicilies
- Tenure: 27 January 1837 – 22 May 1859
- Born: 31 July 1816; Vienna, Austrian Empire
- Died: 8 August 1867 (aged 51); Albano Laziale, Papal States
- Burial: Basilica of Saint Chiara
- Spouse: Ferdinand II of the Two Sicilies (m. 1837; died 1859)
- Issue more...: Prince Louis, Count of Trani; Prince Alfonso, Count of Caserta; Princess Maria Annunziata, Archduchess of Austria; Princess Maria Immaculata, Archduchess of Austria; Prince Gaetan, Count of Girgenti; Princess Maria Pia, Duchess of Parma; Prince Pasquale, Count of Bari; Princess Maria Luisa, Countess of Bardi; Prince Januarius, Count of Caltagirone
Names
- German: Maria Theresia Isabella von Österreich; Italian: Maria Teresa Isabella d'Austria
- House: Habsburg-Lorraine
- Father: Archduke Charles, Duke of Teschen
- Mother: Princess Henrietta of Nassau-Weilburg

Maria Theresa of Austria (31 July 1816 – 8 August 1867) was the second wife of King Ferdinand II of the Two Sicilies, making her Queen of the Two Sicilies. She was the eldest daughter of Archduke Charles, Duke of Teschen, and Princess Henrietta of Nassau-Weilburg.

== Early life (1816–1837) ==
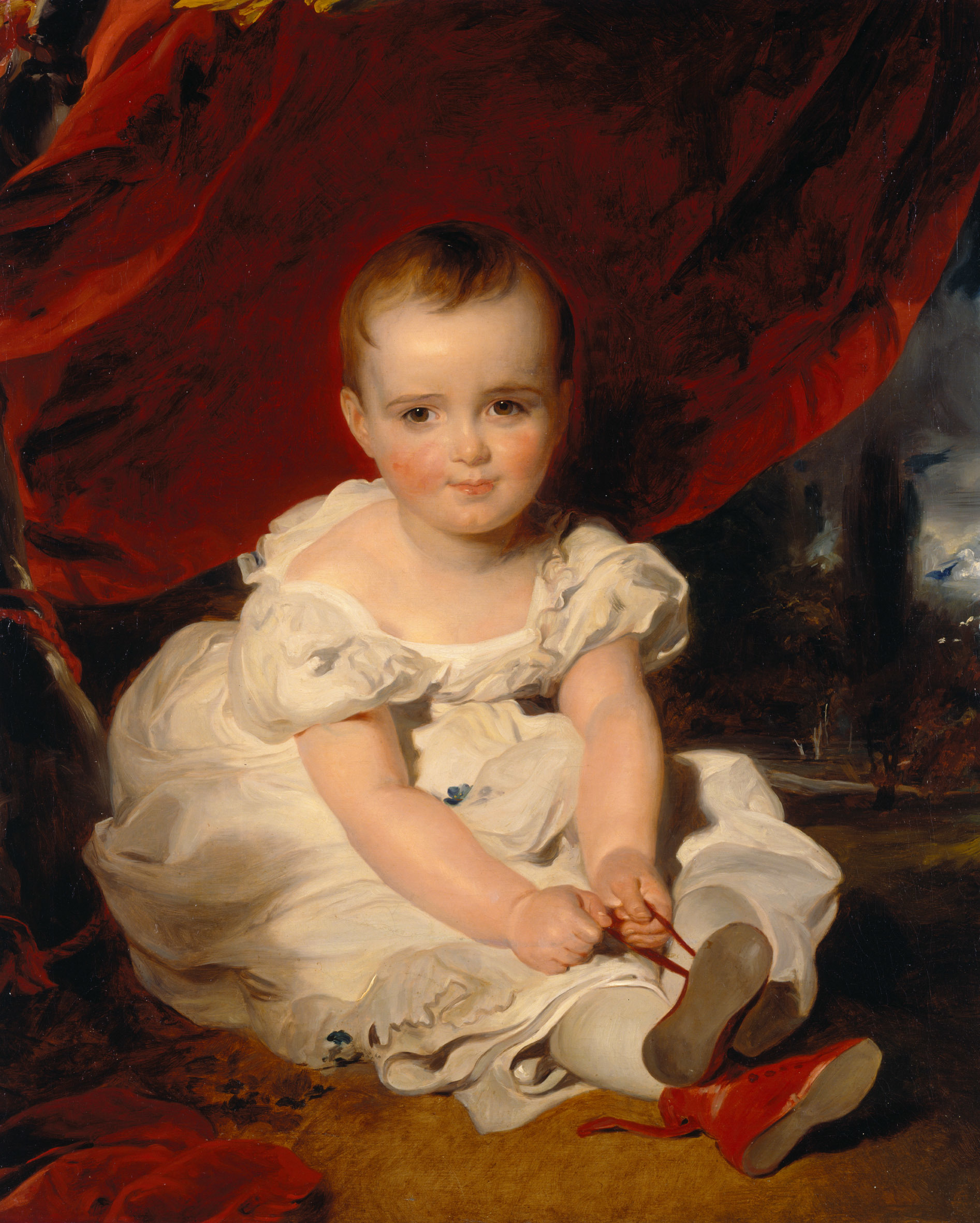
Archduchess Maria Theresa as a toddler in 1819

Archduchess Maria Theresa of Austria was born on 31 July 1816 in Vienna, Austria. She was the eldest child of Archduke Charles, Duke of Teschen and Princess Henrietta of Nassau-Weilburg. Maria Theresa spent her youth with her parents and siblings in the family home.

Shortly before her marriage, Maria Theresa served as Princess-Abbess of the Theresian Institution of Noble Ladies in Prague Castle from 1834 to 1835.

== Queen consort (1837–1859) ==
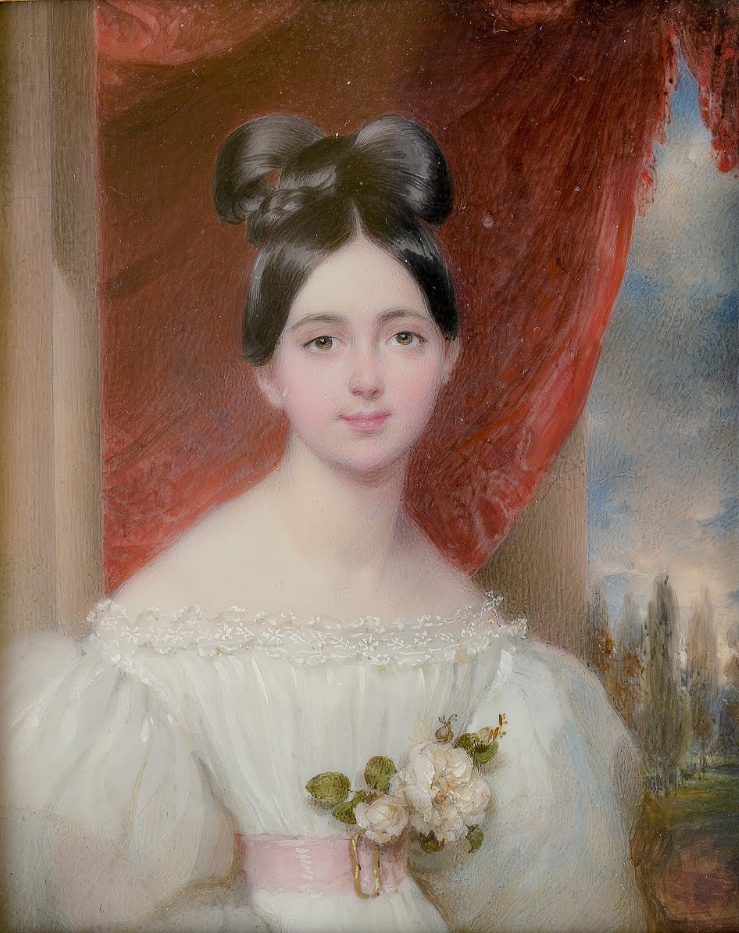
Queen Maria Theresa in 1837

In 1836, King Ferdinand II of the Two Sicilies lost his first wife, Maria Cristina of Savoy in childbirth; they had one son, the future Francis II, last king of the Two Sicilies.

Maria Theresa had met her future husband in July 1837, when Ferdinand had traveled to Vienna to reassure the Austrian government of his support for the conservative cause. Their engagement was kept a secret until December, and they married in January of the next year.

Queen Maria Theresa was described as badly dressed and did not answer to the ideal image of a regal person. She disliked her public role and life at court, and preferred to confine herself in her private rooms dedicated to needlework and her children.

She had a good relationship with both her spouse and her stepson Francis: her stepson respected her and she used to demonstratively call him her son. Maria Theresa was interested in politics; she is known to have acted as the king's advisor and to have influenced him to be strict, and when she could not be present at the reception of officials and wished to hear the conversation, she listened to the talk behind the door.

She nursed Ferdinand on his deathbed.

== Queen dowager (1859–1867) ==
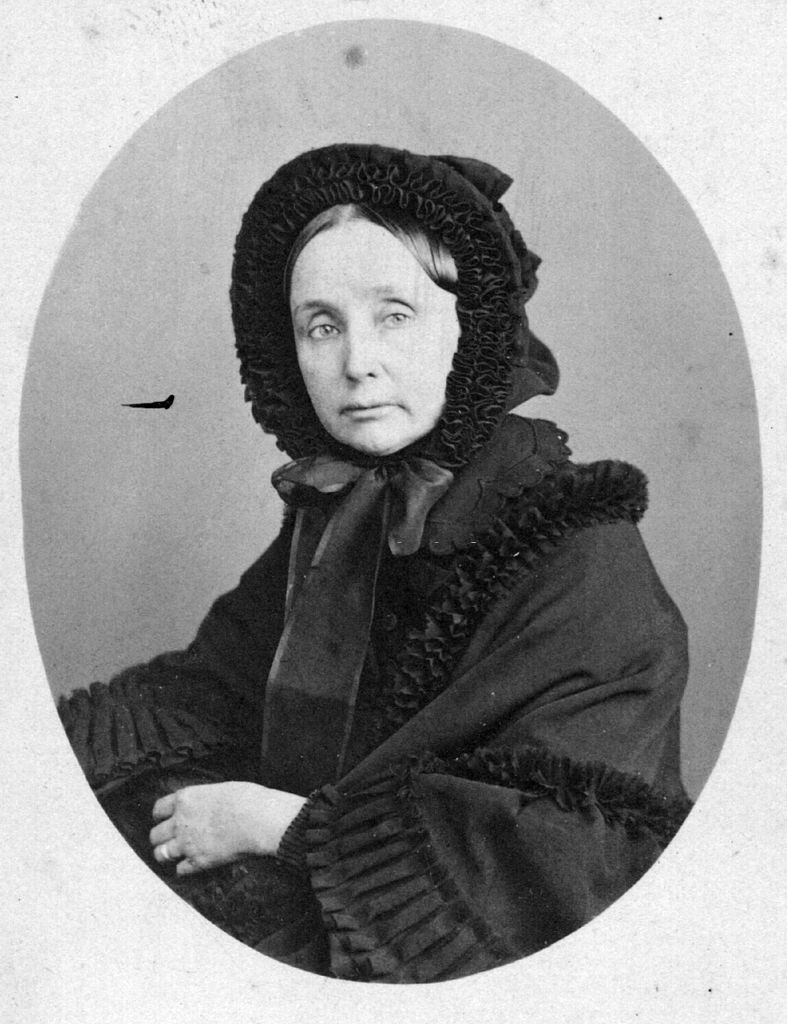
Dowager Queen Maria Theresa in exile, 1866

At the death of her spouse in 1859, she intended to continue her political activity by being the advisor to her stepson Francis, who was the new monarch. Francis was willing, and her authoritarian policy has been considered to contribute to the public discontent which led to the abolishment of the Kingdom of the Two Sicilies. Francis' spouse Duchess Maria Sophia in Bavaria, however, disputed her influence and Francis had a difficult position in the conflict between his wife and stepmother, without being able to satisfy either. Maria Sophia informed Francis about a plot created by Maria Theresa with the attempt to put the biological son of Maria Theresa on the throne, but Francis chose to believe Maria Theresa when she swore her innocence. It was not until the revolts against the monarchy had already begun that Francis decided to listen to the advice of his wife rather than his stepmother.

It was first believed that Maria Theresa would take up exile in Vienna, however, she was among the first to leave Naples during the revolt: first to Gaeta with her children and advisors, and then to Rome. She resided in the same palace that Francis and Maria Sophia would use when they arrived. She died from cholera, nursed by her stepson Francis, who mourned her greatly.

== Issue ==
Maria Theresa gave birth to twelve children, but only seven of them lived to mature adulthood:

Children	Birth	Death	Notes
Lodovico, Count of Trani	1 August 1838	8 June 1886	Married Mathilde Ludovika, Duchess in Bavaria, sister of Empress Elisabeth of Austria. Their only daughter, Princess Maria Teresa of Bourbon-Two Sicilies, married Prince Wilhelm of Hohenzollern-Sigmaringen.
Alberto, Count of Castrogiovanni	17 September 1839	12 July 1844	Died in childhood.
Alfonso, Count of Caserta	28 March 1841	26 May 1934	Married his first cousin Princess Antonietta of Bourbon-Two Sicilies and had issue. The current lines of Bourbon-Two Sicilies descend from him.
Maria Annunciata of the Two Sicilies	24 March 1843	4 May 1871	Married Archduke Karl Ludwig of Austria.
Maria Immaculata of the Two Sicilies	14 April 1844	18 February 1899	Married Archduke Karl Salvator of Austria, Prince of Tuscany.
Gaetano, Count of Girgenti	12 January 1846	26 November 1871	In 1868, he married Isabel, Infanta of Spain (eldest daughter of Queen Isabella II of Spain) and was created Infante of Spain.
Giuseppe, Count of Lucera	4 March 1848	28 September 1851	Died in childhood.
Maria Pia of the Two Sicilies	21 August 1849	29 September 1882	Married Robert I, Duke of Parma.
Vincenzo, Count of Melazzo	26 April 1851	13 October 1854	Died in childhood.
Pasquale, Count of Bari	15 September 1852	21 December 1904	Married morganatically to Blanche Marconnay.
Maria Louisa of the Two Sicilies	21 January 1855	23 August 1874	Married Prince Henry of Bourbon-Parma, Count of Bardi. Died in adolescence, no issue.
Gennaro, Count of Caltagirone	28 February 1857	13 August 1867	Died in childhood.

== Ancestry ==
Ancestors of Maria Theresa of Austria, Queen of the Two Sicilies

8. Francis I, Holy Roman Emperor
4. Leopold II, Holy Roman Emperor
9. Maria Theresa, Queen of Hungary
2. Archduke Charles, Duke of Teschen
10. Charles III of Spain
5. Infanta Maria Luisa of Spain
11. Princess Maria Amalia of Saxony
1. Maria Theresa of Austria
12. Charles Christian, Prince of Nassau-Weilburg
6. Frederick William, Prince of Nassau-Weilburg
13. Princess Carolina of Orange-Nassau
3. Princess Henrietta of Nassau-Weilburg
14. Wilhelm Georg, Burgrave of Kirchberg
7. Burgravine Louise Isabella of Kirchberg
15. Princess Isabelle Auguste Reuss of Greiz

Maria Theresa of Austria, Queen of the Two Sicilies House of Habsburg-Lorraine Born: 31 July 1816 Died: 8 August 1867
Italian royalty
Vacant Title last held by Princess Maria Cristina of Savoy	Queen consort of the Two Sicilies; 27 January 1837 – 22 May 1859	Succeeded by Duchess Maria Sophie of Bavaria
