= Maria Cristina of Savoy =

Queen of the Two Sicilies from 1832 to 1836

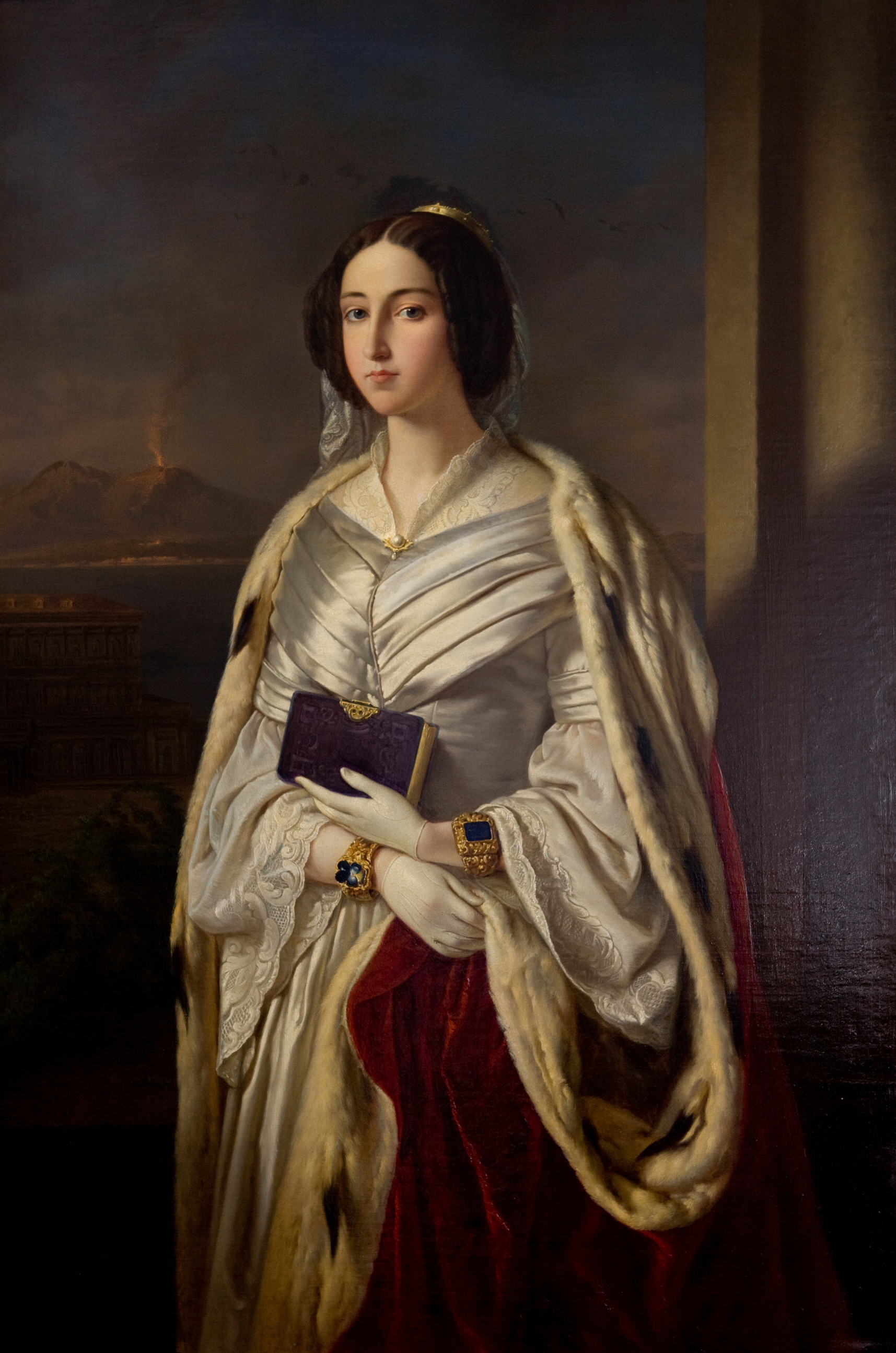
- Portrait by unknown, 19th century

Queen consort of the Two Sicilies
- Tenure: 21 November 1832 – 31 January 1836
- Born: 14 November 1812; Cagliari, Kingdom of Sardinia
- Died: 31 January 1836 (aged 23); Naples, Two Sicilies
- Burial: Basilica di Santa Chiara (Naples)
- Spouse: Ferdinand II of the Two Sicilies (m. 1832)
- Issue: Francis II of the Two Sicilies
Names
- Italian: Maria Cristina Carlotta Giuseppa Gaetana Efisia di Savoia
- House: Savoy
- Father: Victor Emmanuel I of Sardinia
- Mother: Maria Teresa of Austria-Este
- Religion: Roman Catholicism
- Coat of arms of Queen Maria Cristina of Savoy

Maria Cristina of Savoy (Maria Cristina Carlotta Giuseppa Gaetana Efisia; 14 November 1812 – 21 January 1836) was Queen of the Two Sicilies as the first wife of Ferdinand II of the Two Sicilies. She died as a result of childbirth. She is venerated in the Catholic Church, having been beatified by Pope Francis.

== Family ==
Maria Cristina was the youngest daughter of King Victor Emmanuel I of Sardinia and Archduchess Maria Teresa of Austria-Este.

Her maternal grandparents were Archduke Ferdinand of Austria-Este and Maria Beatrice Ricciarda d'Este. Ferdinand was the fourteenth child and third son born to Francis I, Holy Roman Emperor, and Maria Theresa of Austria. Maria Beatrice was the eldest daughter of Ercole III d'Este and Maria Teresa Cybo-Malaspina, Duchess of Massa and Princess of Carrara.

== Queen ==
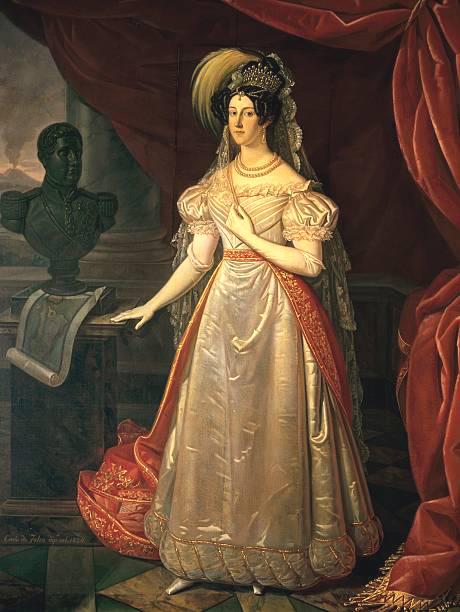
Maria Cristina as Queen

On 21 November 1832, Maria Cristina married Ferdinand II of the Two Sicilies at the sanctuary of Our Lady of Acquasanta. The bride was twenty years old and the groom twenty-two. The next day, she donated her gold-threaded wedding dress to the Redemptorists to adorn a statue of Our Lady of the Rosary.

Maria Cristina was described as beautiful but also timid and shy: modest and reserved, she was deeply religious. Her relationship to Ferdinand was not happy, and he had little patience for her nervous modesty. While she was Queen of the Two Sicilies, she prevented the use of death sentences, and was known as "the Holy Queen".

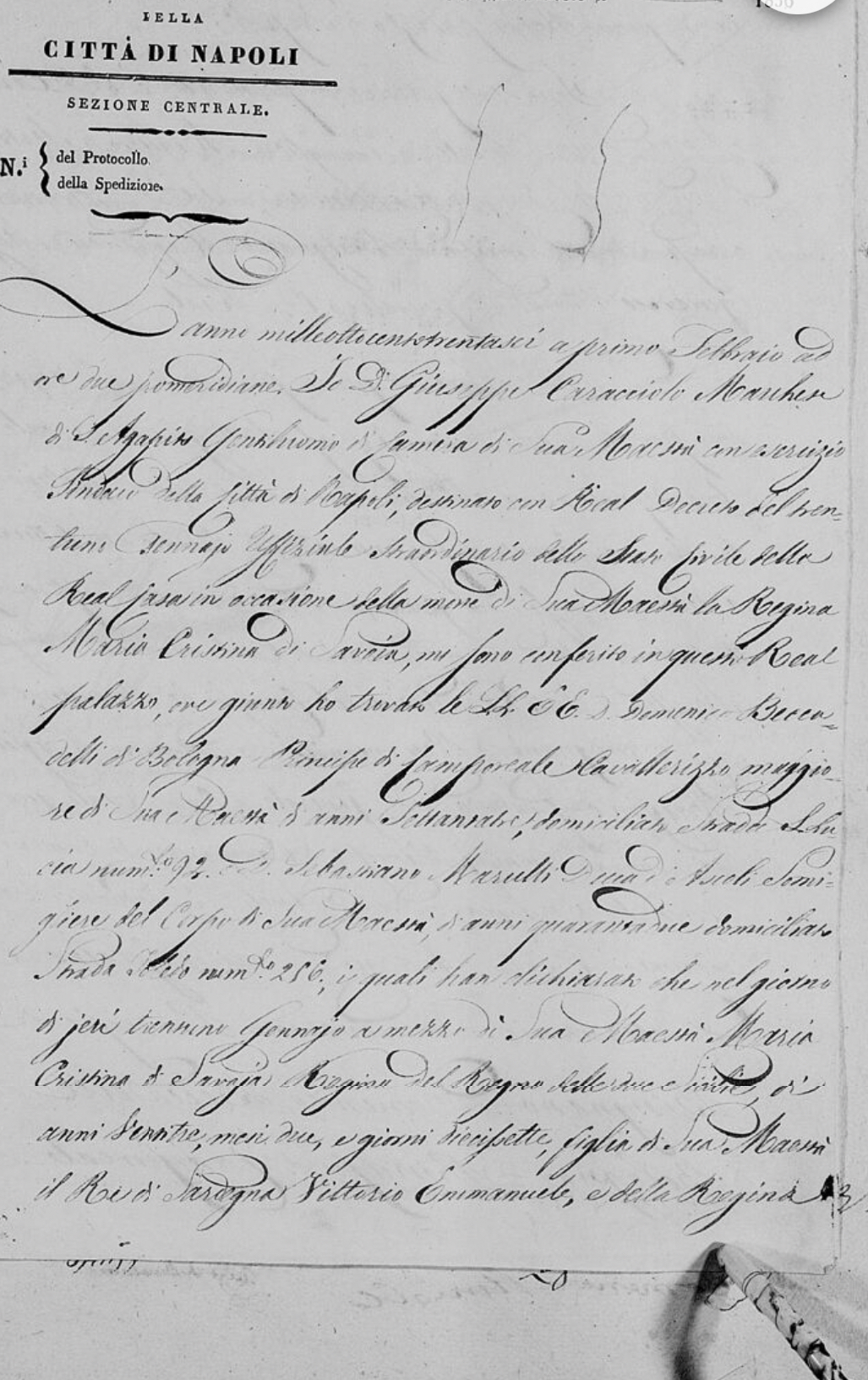
Death certificate of Maria Cristina of Savoy

She died at the age of 23, after having given birth five days before to her only child, later Francis II of the Two Sicilies.

== Beatification ==
Blessed Maria Cristina of Savoy
- Venerated in: Catholic Church
- Beatified: 25 January 2014, Naples, Italy by Pope Francis
- Major shrine: Basilica of Santa Chiara, Naples, Italy
- Feast: 31 January

On 9 July 1859 she was declared to be a Servant of God, on 6 May 1939 a Venerable Servant of God, and on 3 May 2013 Pope Francis authorized a decree recognizing a miracle due to her intercession, a further stage on her process to beatification. Her beatification took place on 25 January 2014 at the Basilica of Santa Chiara (Naples), where she is buried, making her Blessed Maria Cristina of Savoy.

== Ancestry ==
Ancestors of Maria Cristina of Savoy

Charles Emmanuel III of Sardinia
Victor Amadeus III of Sardinia
Polyxena of Hesse-Rotenburg
Victor Emmanuel I of Sardinia
Philip V of Spain
Maria Antonietta of Spain
Elisabeth Farnese
Maria Cristina of Savoy
Francis I, Holy Roman Emperor
Archduke Ferdinand of Austria-Este
Maria Theresa of Austria
Maria Theresa of Austria-Este
Ercole III d'Este, Duke of Modena
Maria Beatrice Ricciarda d'Este
Maria Teresa Cybo-Malaspina

Maria Cristina of Savoy House of Savoy Born: 14 November 1812 Died: 21 January 1836
Italian royalty
| Vacant Title last held by Maria Isabella of Spain | Queen consort of the Two Sicilies; 21 November 1832 – 31 January 1836 | Vacant Title next held by Maria Theresa of Austria |
