= Santa Chiara, Naples =

Religious complex in Naples, Italy

Basilica of Santa Chiara Basilica di Santa Chiara (in Italian)
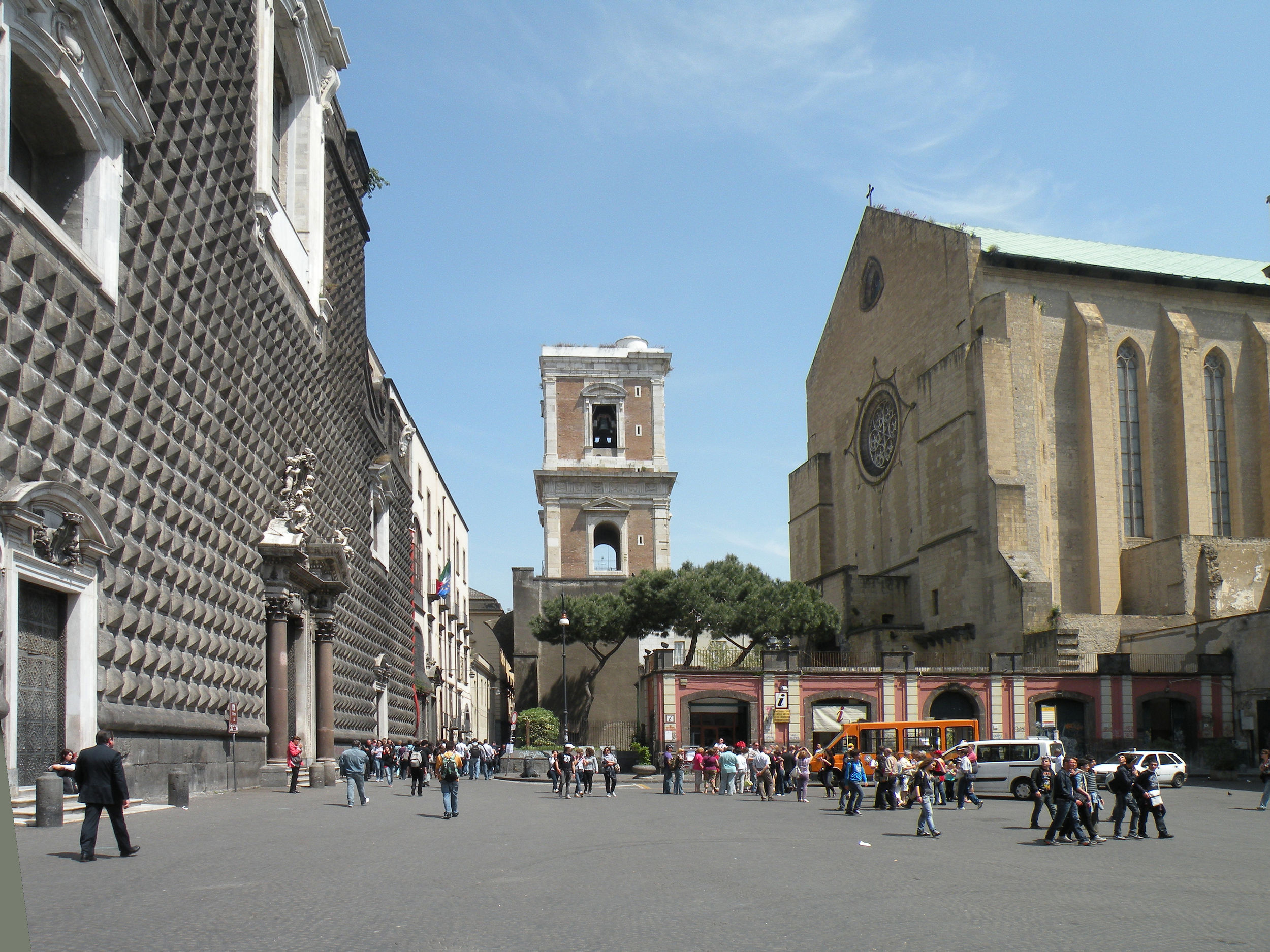
- Façade (right) and belltower of Santa Chiara.

Religion
- Affiliation: Catholic
- Diocese: Archdiocese of Naples
- Ecclesiastical or organisational status: Minor basilica

Location
- Location: Naples, Campania, Italy
- Interactive map of Basilica of Santa Chiara; Basilica di Santa Chiara (in Italian)
- Coordinates: 40.846490°N 14.253055°E

Architecture
- Type: Church
- Style: Early Gothic architecture retaining Romanesque elements

Santa Chiara is a religious complex in Naples, Italy, that includes the church of Santa Chiara, a monastery, tombs and an archeological museum. The basilica church of Santa Chiara faces Via Benedetto Croce, which is the easternmost leg of Via Spaccanapoli. The church façade of Santa Chiara is diagonally across from the church of Gesù Nuovo.

== Architecture ==
The double monastic complex was built in 1313–1340 by Queen Sancha of Majorca and her husband King Robert of Naples, who is also buried in the complex. The original church was in Gotico Angioino style, but was decorated in the 17th century in Baroque style by Domenico Antonio Vaccaro. After the edifice was partially destroyed by a fire after the Allied bombings during World War II, it was brought back to the alleged original state by a disputed restoration, which was completed in 1953.

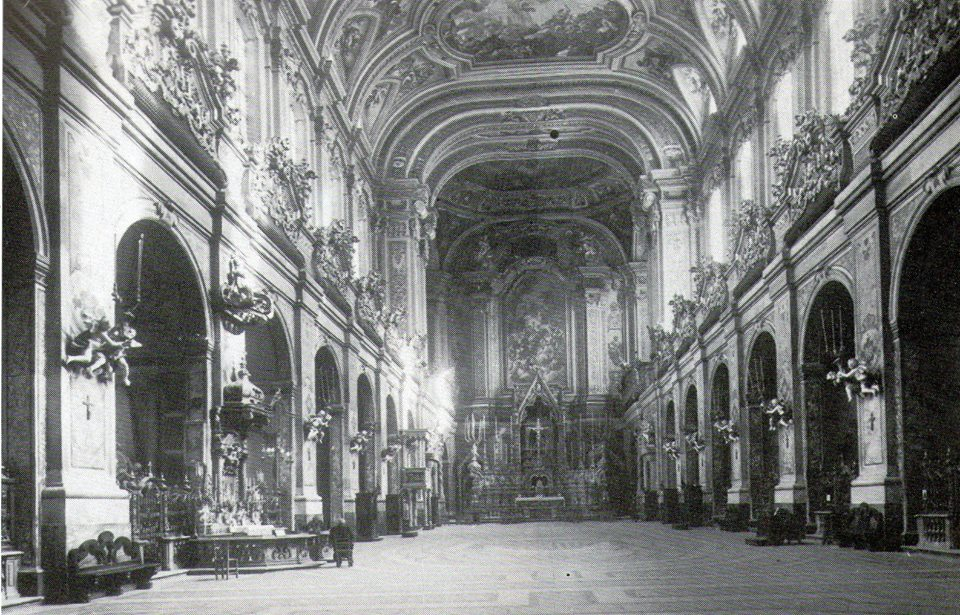
Pre-war baroque interior

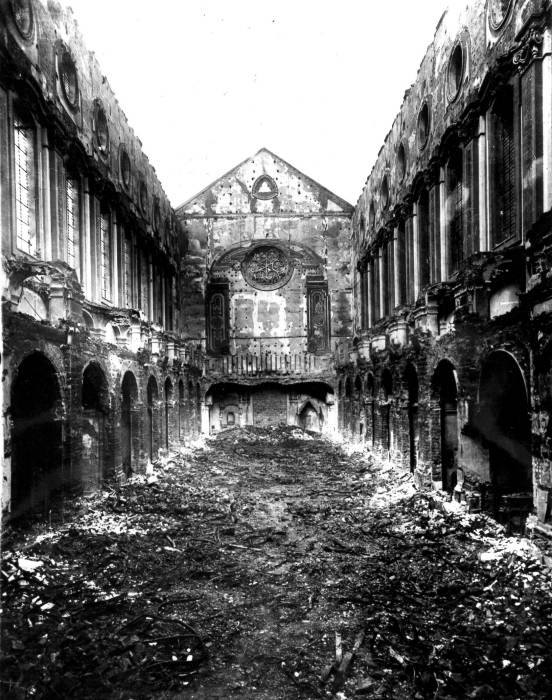
Aftermath of 4 August 1943 bombing and fire

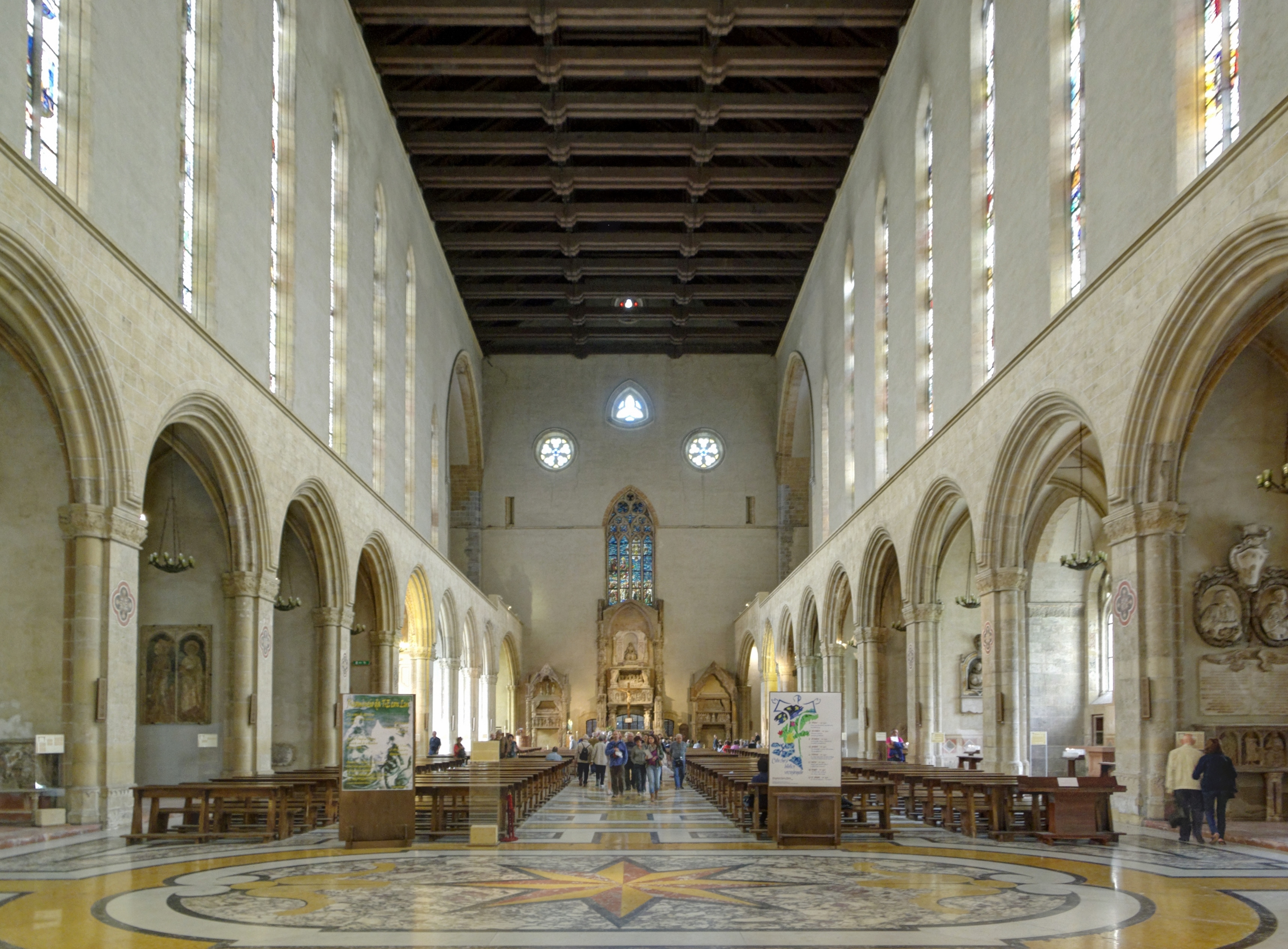
The restoration in Gothic style

The large rectangular building is 110.5 m long inside the walls, and 33 m wide. The walls of the nave are 47.5 m tall, and the nave itself is 82 m long. There are nine lateral chapels on each side of the nave, the roofs of the chapels are vaulted, and they support the gallery that runs the length of the nave. Above the gallery are the lancet windows of the clerestory. An unusual feature of the building is that the lateral chapels are absorbed into the body of the church, giving Santa Chiara its distinctive rectangular appearance. Another unusual feature of the building is the fact that the church does not have an apse, after the lateral chapels there is a section of the church with the high altar in the centre, flanked by the rectangular friars’ choirs on either side. Behind the altar is the tomb of King Robert, behind that is a wall separating the main body of the church from the nuns' choir.

The wall between the nave of the church and the retrochoir is penetrated by three screened grilles through which the nuns could observe the mass, while being invisible to anybody in the nave. There are also four windows in the wall which mirror the four windows on the exterior of the church. There is a large stained glass lancet window above the altar. Above this is a triangular pattern are three rose windows. At the apex of the point of the roof, above the level of the wooden beams of the ceiling is a fourth, smaller, rose window. The nuns choir is different in plan from the main body of the church, with two large piers supported by rib vaults dividing the space into three sections. Santa Chiara was the largest Clarissan church ever built and it was the first Clarissan church built where the nuns in their choir would have been able to view the performance of Mass.

The bell tower, separated from the main edifice, was begun in 1328 but was completed only in Renaissance times.

== Interior ==
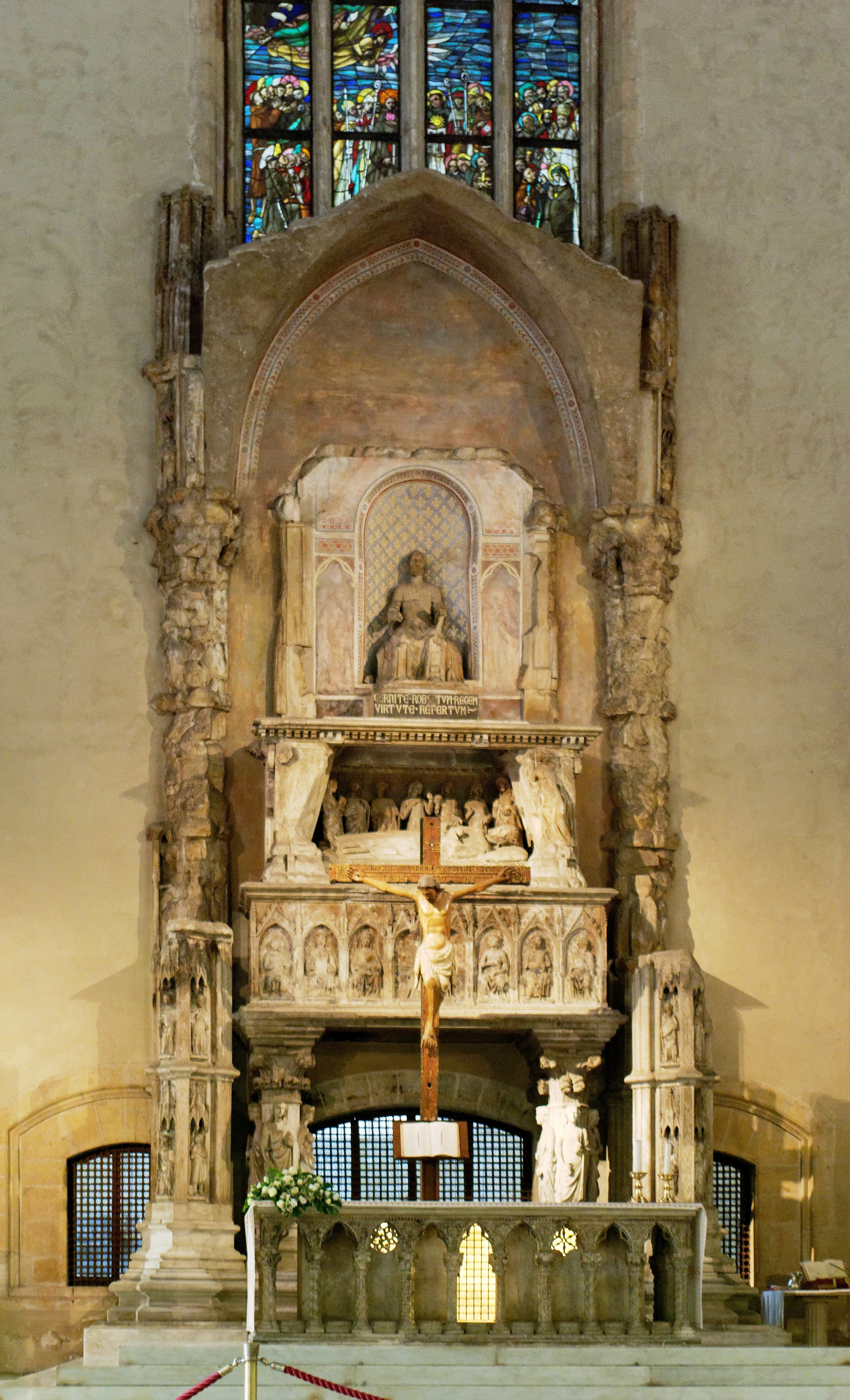
Tomb of Robert of Anjou

Behind the main altar is the tomb of King Robert of Anjou, which was sculpted by Pacio and Giovanni Bertini in 1343. In the side chapels are the tombs of the Bourbon king of Naples, Francis II and his consort Maria Sophie of Bavaria, as well as those of Queen Maria Christina of Savoy and of the national hero Salvo D'Acquisto (a carabiniere who sacrificed his life to save the lives of 22 civilian hostages during the Nazi occupation). The church was used, even before it was formally completed, to hold the relics of Saint Louis of Toulouse, elder brother of King Robert. One of these relics was the brain of St. Louis, in an ornate reliquary decorated with a crown Queen Sancha had donated in memory of her brother-in-law.

Initially, the interior had a Gothic style, but reconstruction from 1742 to 1762 by Domenico Vaccaro, Gaetano Buonocore, and Giovanni del Gaizo, refurbished the interior in a Baroque style. The stuccoed ceiling was frescoed by a team of artists, including Francesco De Mura, Giuseppe Bonito, Sebastiano Conca, and Paolo de Maio. The floor was paved with a design by Ferdinando Fuga. Unfortunately much of the interior decoration was destroyed in the aerial bombardment of 1943.

On the counterfacade is the tomb of Antonio Penna, by Antonio Baboccio. In the Chapel of the Sacred Heart is the tomb of Raimondo de' Cabanni.

In the sixth chapel to the left, are 14th-century bas reliefs depicting the Martyrdom of the wife of Massenzio, while the seventh has a tomb of Louis, a son of Charles, Duke of Durazzo, another 14th-century work by the Florentine Pacio Bertini.

To the right of the presbytery is access to the Baroque sacristy with frescoes from 1692. Through the sacristy, one can reach the Choir of the Nuns. The choir houses fragments of frescoes depicting Biblical Stories by Giotto.

== Majolica Cloister ==
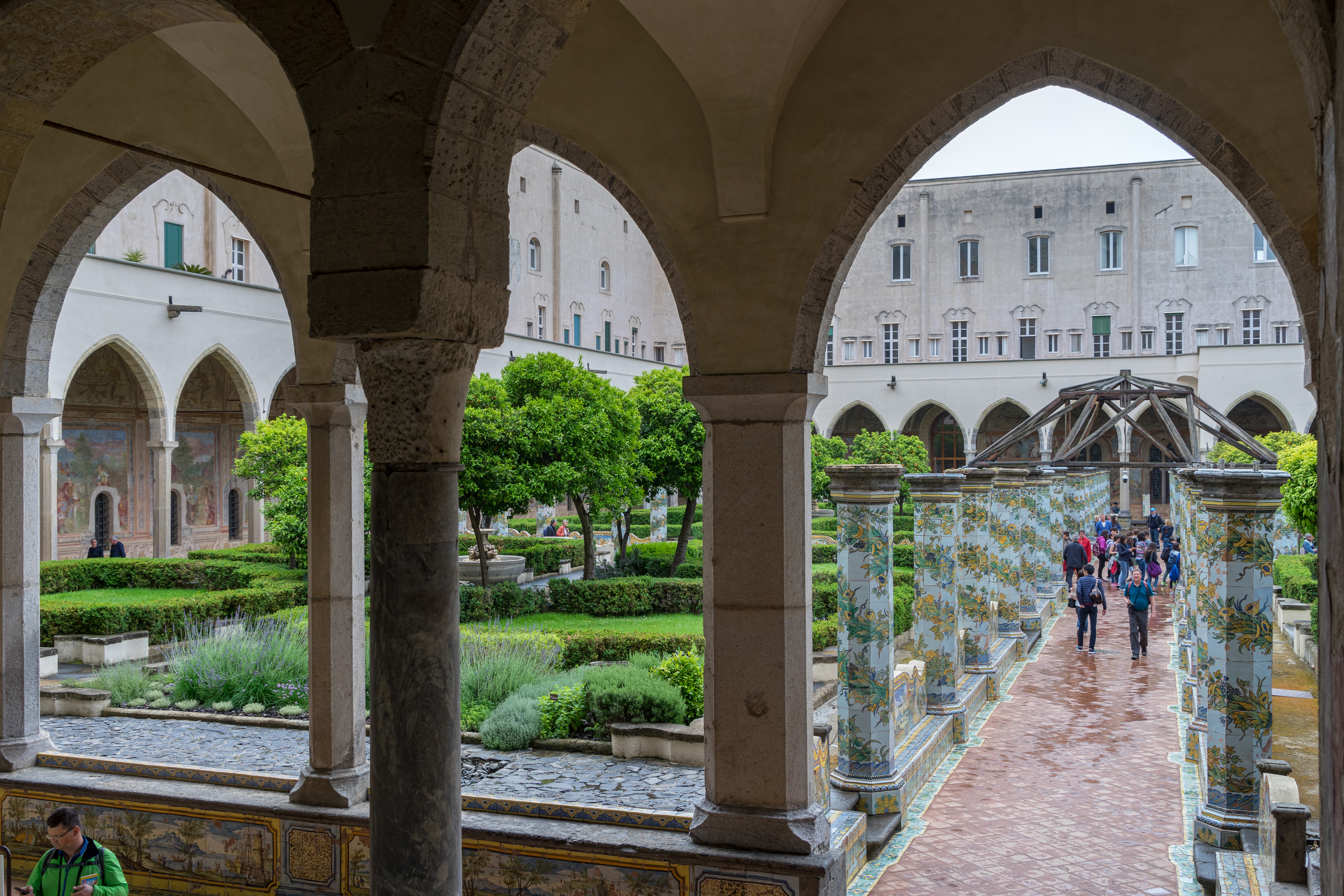
Cloister

The cloister of the Clarisses is known for the unique addition of majolica tiles, added in 1742 by Domenico Antonio Vaccaro in Rococò style. The brash color floral decoration makes this cloister, with octagonal columns in pergola-like structure, likely unique and would seem to clash with the introspective world of cloistered nuns. The cloister arcades are also decorated by frescoes, now much degraded.

== Museum ==
The museum houses information on the history of the church, archaeological findings and materials remaining after the fire that destroyed part of the church in 1943. It also has a collection of baroque presepi (nativity scenes).
