= Francis I and His Family =

1820 painting by Giuseppe Cammarano

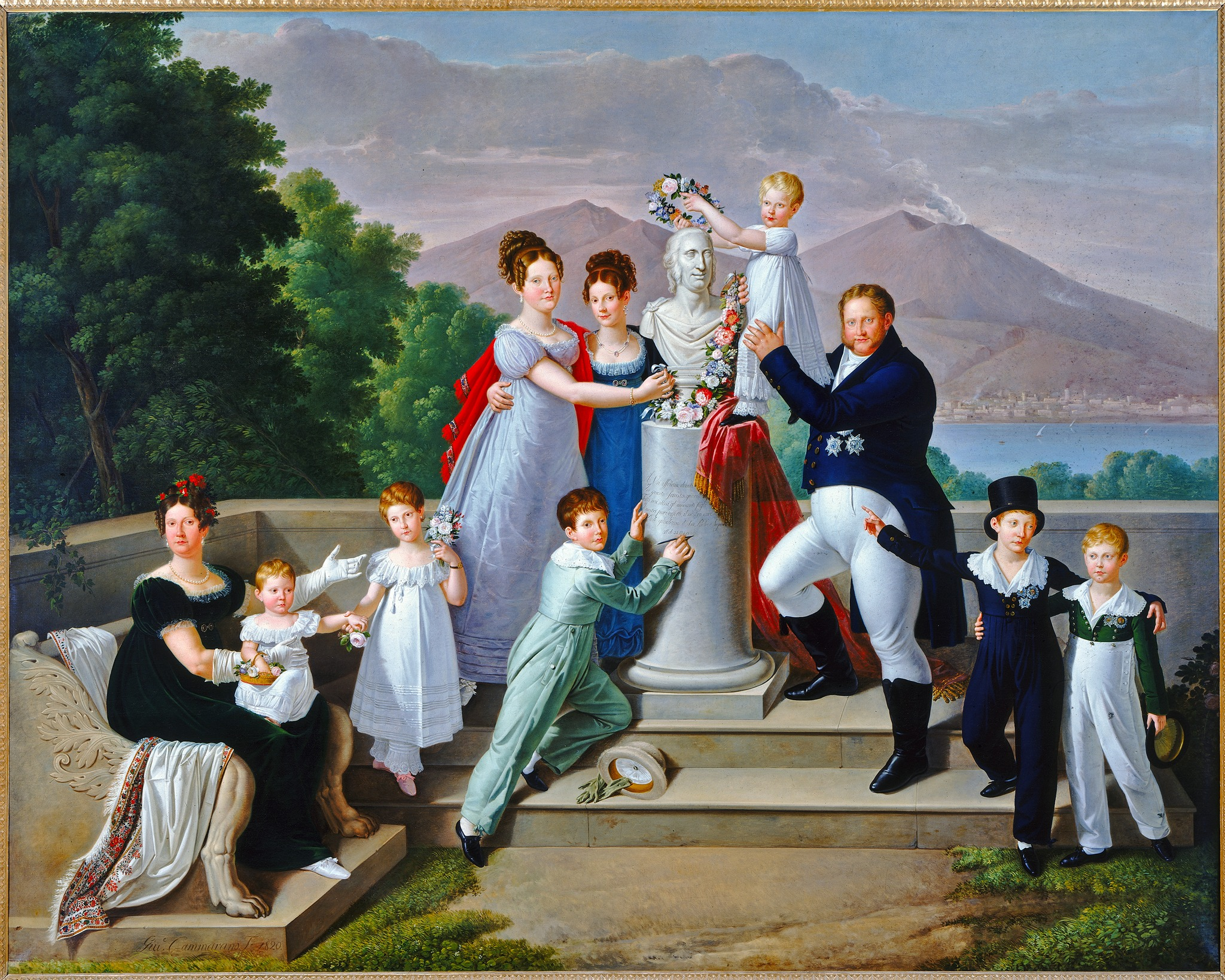

Francis I and His Family is an 1820 oil on canvas painting by Giuseppe Cammarano, now in the National Museum of Capodimonte in Naples.

Crown prince Francis had to remain in Sicily to act as vicar general even after the overthrow of Joachim Murat and French rule in Naples. He finally returned to Naples where in 1820 he commissioned Cammarano to produce the work in honour of his father Ferdinand I's sixtieth birthday. It initially hung in the Portici Palace in 1823 before being moved to the Capodimonte Palace seven years later. On the unification of Italy it was moved to the palace in Caserta and finally moved to its present home.

At the far left the work shows Francis's wife Maria Isabella with their daughter Maria Carolina. Next are Maria Antonia and Luisa Carlotta. On the right are Charles Ferdinand and Leopold. In the centre Maria Christina, Ferdinand II, Maria Amalia and Francis himself, all gathered around a marble bust of Ferdinand I in the style of Antonio Canova - Maria Amalia places a floral crown on the bust. On the column is a phrase in honour of his grandfather's name. The two children missing are Marie-Caroline (Francis' daughter with Maria Clementina) and Antonio. In the background is a landscape of the Bay of Naples and Mount Vesuvius.

== Sources ==
- Touring Club Italiano, Museo di Capodimonte, Milano, Touring Club Editore, 2012. ISBN 978-88-365-2577-5
