= Portrait of Maria Luisa of Parma =

Painting by Francisco de Goya

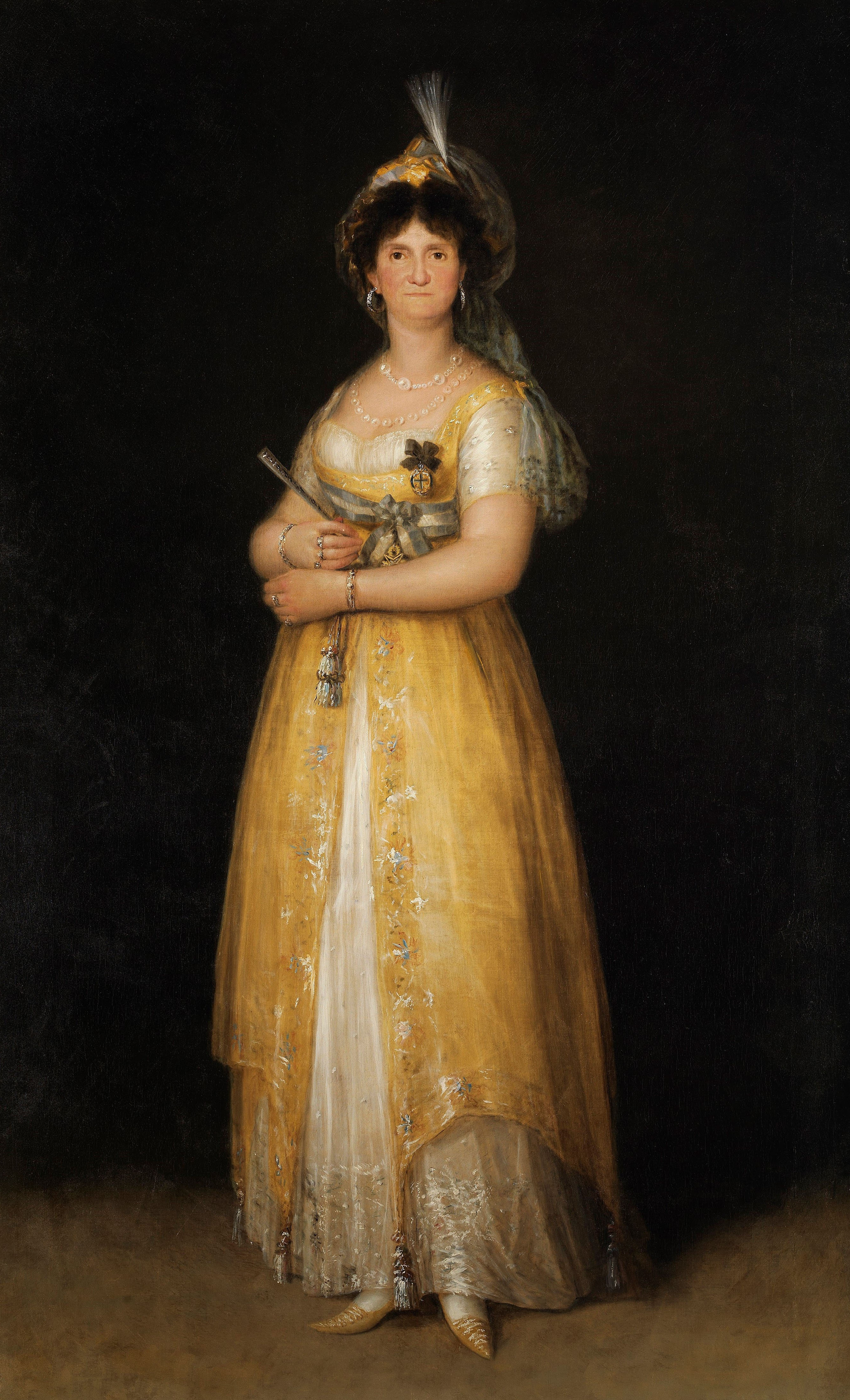
- Artist: Francisco Goya
- Year: 1799–1800
- Medium: Oil on canvas
- Dimensions: 202 cm × 124 cm (80 in × 49 in)
- Location: National Museum of Capodimonte; Naples

Portrait of Maria Luisa of Parma is a portrait of Maria Luisa of Parma, wife of Charles IV of Spain, from 1799–1800. It was produced as a pendant painting to a portrait of her husband. Both works were long thought to be a copy after an autograph work by Francisco Goya, but they have now been definitively reattributed as autograph works by Goya himself, produced late in the 18th century. Goya was a court artist to the royal family, though most of his paintings of them are still in the Prado Museum. The two works were commissioned by the couple's daughter Maria Isabella of Spain. They were sent to Maria Isabella and they are both now in the National Museum of Capodimonte in Naples.

== See also ==
- List of works by Francisco Goya

== Sources ==
- Mario Sapio, Il Museo di Capodimonte, Napoli, Arte'm, 2012. ISBN 978-88-569-0303-4
- Touring Club Italiano, Museo di Capodimonte, Milano, Touring Club Editore, 2012. ISBN 978-88-365-2577-5
