= John Rowland Smyth =

British Army general

Lieutenant-General Sir John Rowland Smyth KCB
- Born: 1803; County Waterford, Ireland
- Died: 14 May 1873; Kensington, London
- Military career
- Allegiance: United Kingdom
- Branch: British Army
- Service years: 1821–1873
- Rank: Lieutenant-General
- Units: 16th The Queen's Lancers; 32nd (Cornwall) Regiment of Foot; 6th Dragoon Guards
- Commands: 6th Dragoon Guards
- Conflicts: Siege of Bharatpur; Battle of Aliwal
- Awards: Knight Commander of the Order of the Bath

Lieutenant-General Sir John Rowland Smyth KCB (1803 – 14 May 1873) was an Anglo-Irish officer in the British Army who saw service in British India.

== Early life and education ==
Smyth was born at Ballynatray House, Templemichael, County Waterford, the fifth and youngest son of Grice Smyth and his wife, Mary Brodrick Mitchell. He was educated at Trinity College, Dublin.

He had three sisters, including Gertrude, who married William Hughes, 1st Baron Dinorben, and Penelope, who eloped with HRH Prince Charles of the Two Sicilies, Prince of Capua.

== Career ==
Smyth was commissioned as a cornet into the on 5 July 1821 and, promoted to Lieutenant on 26 May 1825, he fought at the Capture of Bharatpur later that year. He was made a Captain on 22 April 1826, and transferred to the 32nd (Cornwall) Regiment of Foot. After 10 years with the 32nd he moved to the 6th Dragoon Guards, before being given a year-long leave of absence in 1830 to serve a prison sentence. Smyth had fought one of the last duels in the United Kingdom, and both he and his second, Capt. Frederick Markham, were imprisoned for manslaughter in the death of Standish Stanley O'Grady on 18 March 1830 in Ireland.

Promoted to Major on 17 August 1841, he returned to the 16th Lancers on 6 May 1842 and served with it during the Gwalior campaign and First Anglo-Sikh War. At the Battle of Aliwal, Smyth led the 16th Lancers to rout the Sikh cavalry and break a square of infantry; he was mentioned in dispatches and made a brevet Lieutenant-Colonel.

After a series of promotions and successes he was made a Knight Commander of the Order of the Bath on 13 March 1867, promoted to Lieutenant-General on 1 April 1870, and became Colonel of the 6th Dragoon Guards on 21 January 1868.

He was married to Hon. Catherine Alice Abbott, daughter of Lord Tenterden, who survived him following his death on 14 May 1873. They had a daughter, Penelope Mary Gertrude, who in 1859 married her cousin Charles Abbott, 3rd Baron Tenterden.
