= Portrait of Charles IV of Spain =

Painting by Francisco de Goya

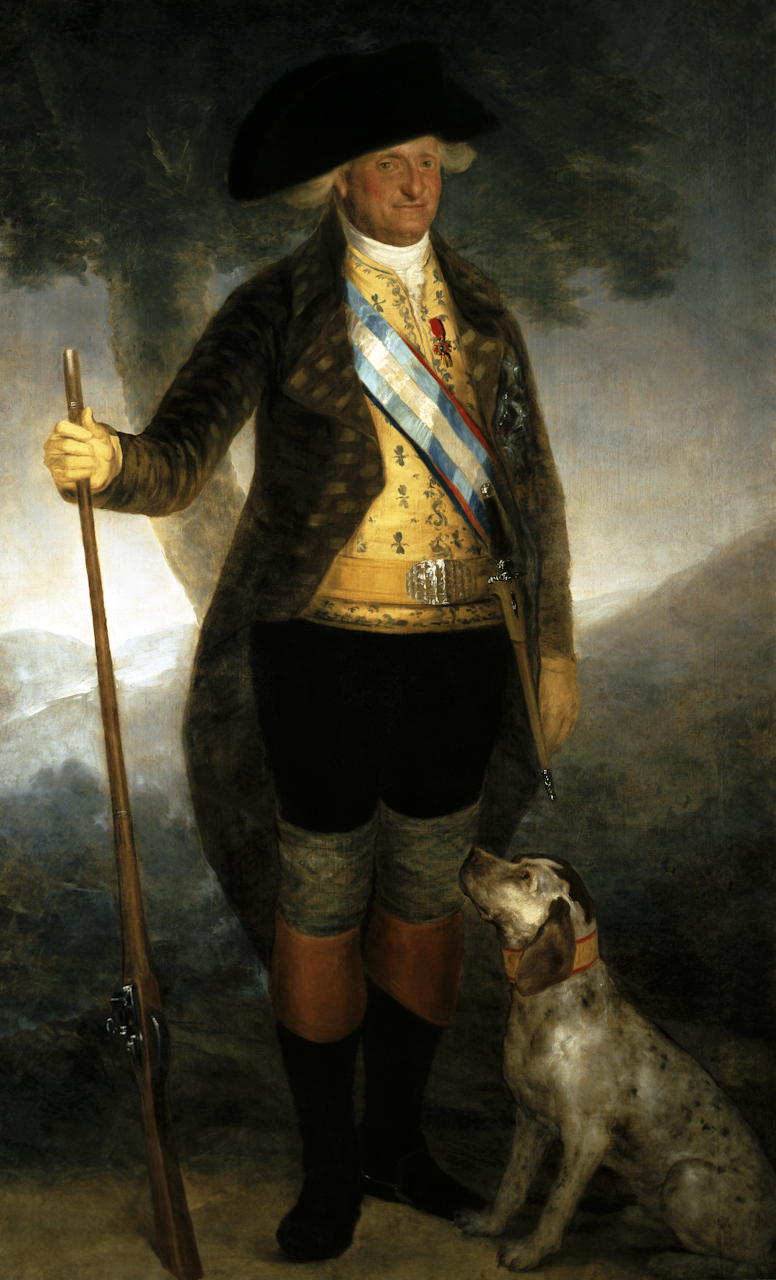
Portrait of Charles IV of Spain (1790s) by Francisco Goya

Portrait of Charles IV of Spain is a portrait of Charles IV of Spain in hunting dress with a hunting dog. Both it and a pendant of his wife were long thought to be a copy after an autograph work by Francisco Goya, but they have now been definitively reattributed as autograph works by Goya himself, produced late in the 18th century. Goya was a court artist to the royal family, though most of his paintings of them are still in the Prado Museum. The two works were commissioned by Charles's daughter Maria Isabella of Spain along with. It was sent to Maria Isabella and they are both now in the National Museum of Capodimonte in Naples.

== See also ==
- List of works by Francisco Goya

== Sources ==
- "SPMN - Museo di Capodimonte (Sito Ufficiale)". Archived from the original on 2015-02-03.
- Mario Sapio, Il Museo di Capodimonte, Napoli, Arte'm, 2012. ISBN 978-88-569-0303-4
- Touring Club Italiano, Museo di Capodimonte, Milano, Touring Club Editore, 2012. ISBN 978-88-365-2577-5
