= Charles Abbott, 3rd Baron Tenterden =

British diplomat

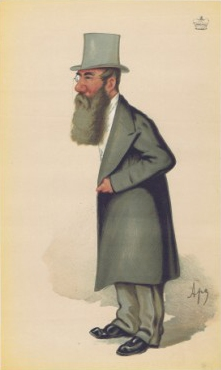
Vanity Fair caricature.

Charles Stuart Aubrey Abbott, 3rd Baron Tenterden KCB (26 December 1834 – 22 September 1882), was a British diplomat.

== Biography ==
Abbott was born in London, the son of Charles Abbott (1803–1838), younger son of Charles Abbott, 1st Baron Tenterden. The title passed to the younger Charles on the death of his uncle John Henry Abbott, 2nd Baron Tenterden (1796–1870). He was educated at Eton College (1848–53), and entered into service at the Foreign Office in 1854 by the patronage of the foreign secretary, Lord Clarendon.

In the 1860s and '70s Abbott was involved in the negotiations of the famous Alabama Claims. His sense of moderation came to good use in the successful arbitration of the dispute. In 1873 Tenterden was promoted to the post of permanent under-secretary, and in 1878 he was created KCB.

He was married twice; his first wife was his cousin Penelope Smyth, with whom he had four children - Audrey Mary Florence born 1861, Geraldine Alice Ellen born 1863, Charles Stuart Henry born 1865, and Gwen Elca Violet born 1868. Penelope died in 1879. The year after Tenterden married the widow Emma Rowcliffe (née Bailey, d. 1928). He died in Lynmouth in 1882.

== Arms ==
Coat of arms of Charles Abbott, 3rd Baron Tenterden
Crest A fox statant per pale Or and Argent charged on the shoulder with a water bouget Sable. Escutcheon Purpure a pile wavy vairy Or and Gules in base two water bougets fesswise of the second on a canton Argent a crozier erect Azure. Supporters Dexter a dragon wings elevated Vert gorged with a collar of roses and portcullises alternately and charged on the wing with a water bouget Or; sinister a pelican wings elevated Or vulned and gorged with a wreath of roses Gules. Motto Labore (By Labour)

Peerage of the United Kingdom
Preceded by John Henry Abbott	Baron Tenterden; 1870–1882	Succeeded by Charles Stuart Henry Abbott
