= Charles Abbott, 1st Baron Tenterden =

British barrister and judge, Lord Chief Justice of the King's Bench (1762–1832)

The Right Honourable The Lord Tenterden PC
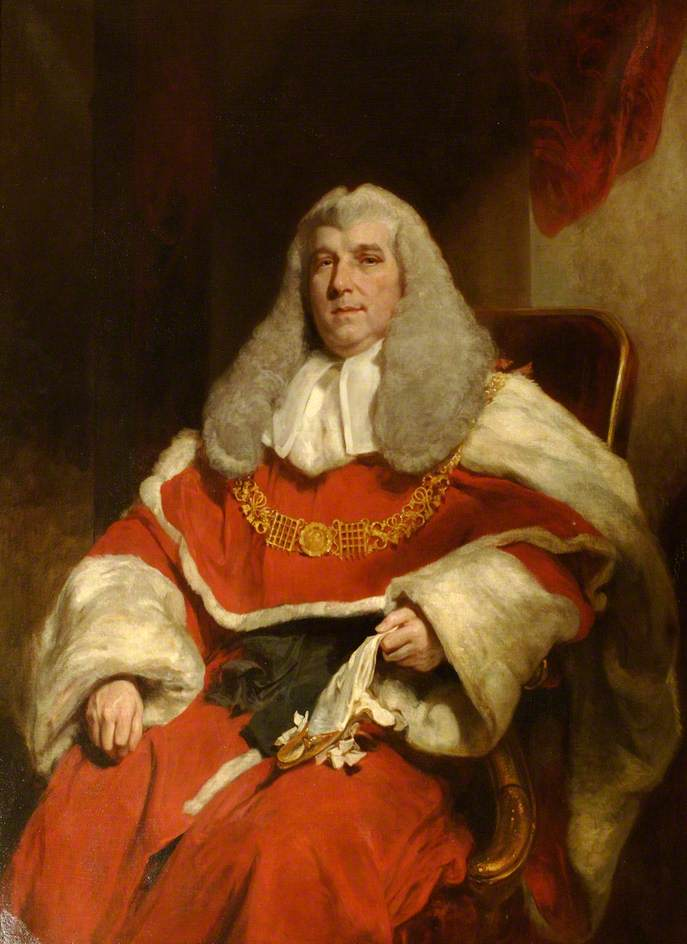
- Portrait by William Owen

Lord Chief Justice
- In office 4 November 1818 – 4 November 1832
- Preceded by: The Lord Ellenborough
- Succeeded by: Sir Thomas Denman

Personal details
- Born: 7 October 1762 Canterbury, Kent, England
- Died: 4 November 1832 (aged 70) Bloomsbury, Middlesex, England
- Party: Tory
- Spouse: Mary Lamotte
- Education: Corpus Christi College, Oxford
- Profession: Barrister, judge

Charles Abbott, 1st Baron Tenterden PC (7 October 1762 – 4 November 1832), was a British barrister and judge who served as Lord Chief Justice of the King's Bench between 1818 and 1832. Born in obscure circumstances to a barber and his wife in Canterbury, Abbott was educated initially at a dame school before moving to The King's School, Canterbury in 1769. He was noted as an excellent student, receiving an exhibition scholarship from the school in March 1781, when he matriculated at Corpus Christi College, Oxford. Here he was elected a fellow, and also served as a tutor to the son of Sir Francis Buller, which first made him consider becoming a barrister. He joined the Middle Temple in 1787, transferring to the Inner Temple in 1793, and was called to the Bar by the Inner Temple in 1796. Abbott was noted as an excellent barrister, earning more than any other during his time at the Bar, despite being considered unimaginative and a poor speaker. He was offered a position as a Justice of the Court of Common Pleas in 1808, which he turned down; he accepted the same offer in 1816, receiving the customary knighthood and being appointed a Serjeant-at-Law.

Three months after he started sitting as a judge he was transferred to the Court of King's Bench, where he was initially rather poor, being unfamiliar with the court's business. Within two years he showed "the highest judicial excellence", and when Lord Ellenborough had a stroke in 1818, Abbott was chosen to replace him as Lord Chief Justice. His reign at the head of the Court of King's Bench saw the court flourish, with strong justices and his own much-admired abilities. He was appointed to the peerage in 1827, sitting as Charles Abbott, 1st Baron Tenterden, and initially attended the House of Lords regularly. His opposition to the Reform Act 1832, which he claimed treated city corporations "with absolute contempt", led to his refusal to attend the Lords. Continuing to sit as Lord Chief Justice, Abbott gradually grew weaker, and finally fell ill halfway through a two-day trial. His disease baffled doctors, and he died on 4 November 1832 at his home in Queen Square, London.

== Early life and education ==
Abbott was born 7 October 1762 in Canterbury to John Abbott, a barber, and his wife Alice. Abbot lived in a "small, mean-looking house" near the Cathedral, and was initially educated at a dame school. During his childhood he was noted as "industrious, apprehensive, regular and correct in all his conduct". He attended The King's School, Canterbury, from 1769, where he was such a good student that he received an exhibition scholarship on his matriculation at Corpus Christi College, Oxford, in March 1781. At the time there were only two awards at Oxford: the Chancellor's medals for English and Latin prose. After an initial attempt to win them which failed, he won the Latin prize in his second year and the English prize in the third. Abbot was then elected a fellow of Corpus Christi where, acting as a tutor to the son of Sir Francis Buller, he first considered becoming a barrister. On 16 November 1787 he became a member of the Middle Temple, transferring to the Inner Temple in 1793, and worked for two years under Sir George Wood as a special pleader; it was said that he had finished his work as a special pleader faster than "any man before or since". He was called to the Bar by the Inner Temple in 1796.

== Career ==
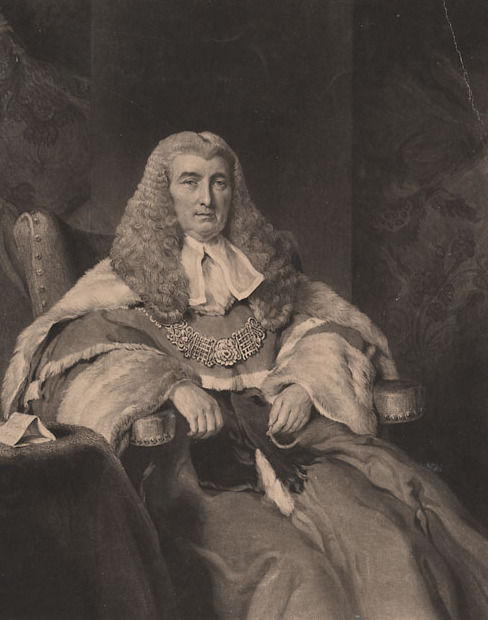
Abbott, after his ascension to the peerage

Abbott began practising on the Oxford Circuit; while travelling there he had a fall from his horse, which broke his leg in two places and left him permanently lame. In 1802, he published a legal tract, On Merchants' Ships and Seamen, which was praised by his fellow lawyers and earned him a large amount of commercial work; it was later republished in the United States, where it was misattributed to Charles Abbot, the Speaker of the House of Commons. He would be "as eminent and prosperous as a counsel can be at the English bar", although he refused to apply for silk. From 1802 to 1816 he served as "Devil to the Attorney General", opening all government prosecutions, and was standing counsel for the Bank of England and many Deans and Prelates in the Church of England. By 1807, he was making £8,000 a year, and later exceeded this amount; it was remarked that he earned more money than any other barrister of that time. Abbott was not a "flashy" barrister; although known as an excellent lawyer, his speeches were monotonous and he lacked an imagination.

In 1808 he was offered a position as a Justice of the Court of Common Pleas, but refused it. After eight more years of work, however, he felt that his health could no longer take the strain, and accepted a position in the Court of Common Pleas on 24 January 1816, along with becoming a Serjeant-at-Law as required. Abbott was granted the customary knighthood, with the motto "Labore", which he also used for his peerage. He stayed in this post for barely three months, with no records of his work there surviving, before being transferred against his will to the Court of King's Bench on 3 May to replace Simon Le Blanc.

Abbott, unfamiliar with the Court of King's Bench (having been a regional lawyer rather than a London-based one), was initially a disappointment, but soon improved. By 1818, he showed "the highest judicial excellence", although he was criticised for snapping at boring barristers and for taking the government's side in prosecutions.

That year, the Lord Chief Justice Lord Ellenborough had a stroke, forcing his retirement. Most of the other judges and legal figures were inappropriate for the role; Sir Samuel Shepherd, for example, was while an able lawyer too deaf to sit as a judge. As a result, Abbott was appointed, and formally took up his position on 4 November 1818.

As Lord Chief Justice he saw the Court of King's Bench flourish, with competent Justices and his own abilities; "[Abbott] had more knowledge of mankind than any of [the Justices], and was more skilful as a moderator in forensic disputation". Abbott's central weakness as a judge was seen to be his support of James Scarlett, his leader when Abbott was a barrister; "The timid junior, become Chief Justice, still looked up to his old leader with dread, was afraid of offending him, and was always delighted when he could decide in his favour".

On 30 April 1827, Abbott was made Baron Tenterden, of Hendon in the County of Middlesex; having feared that "Lord Abbott" would leave him open to ridicule, he instead picked the name of a Kentish town near his roots. On 24 May, Abbott formally took up his position, attending the House of Lords regularly, and was the last Chief Justice to wear his official robes to the Lords (other than those acting as interim Speakers).

In 1830, he introduced several bills to Parliament following reports on the state of the Ecclesiastical Courts, common law courts and law of real property; all were passed, except the ecclesiastical bills, as Parliament ran out of time to hear them. They were heard during the next Parliamentary session in 1831, and both passed; they "by no means established for him the reputation of a skilful legislator... the judges have found it infinitely difficult to put a reasonable construction upon them". The Reform Act 1832 led to his departure from the Lords, and is considered to have greatly shortened his life; he fought strongly for the city corporations, which he claimed the bill treated "with absolute contempt", but would be defeated. Having threatened that, should it pass, "Never, never my Lords, shall I enter the doors of this House", he was true to his word, and never returned to politics, although from 8 August to 3 September 1827 he was interim Chancellor of the Exchequer, following the convention that, when vacant, the position should be held by the Lord Chief Justice.

== Death ==
Abbott first began to grow ill in May 1832, when he wrote to Sir Egerton Brydges that "My spirit is so depressed, that when I am not strongly excited by some present object that admits of no delay, I sink into something very nearly approaching torpidity". Although he got somewhat better, giving his annual dinner to the King's Counsel, it was noticed that he was unable to drink his wine properly.

He went to the Midland Circuit in June, as it was the easiest one, but he suffered from "a violent cough" and other symptoms, returning to his home in Hendon. After the first day of a two-day case he found himself losing his appetite and suffering from a fever, which caused him to talk incoherently and become delirious. The disease baffled doctors, and finally killed him on 4 November 1832 at his home in Queen Square, London; his last words were "and now, gentlemen of the jury, you will consider of your verdict". He was interred at the Foundling Hospital, of which he was a governor.

== Personal life ==
Abbott married Mary Lamotte on 30 July 1795. He enjoyed the domestic element of his life, and records show love poetry written to his wife. Prior to their marriage Mary had sent him a lock of her hair; in exchange, he wrote a poem for her entitled "The Answer of a Lock of Hair to the Inquiries of its Former Mistress". The couple had two sons and two daughters; John (2nd Baron Tenterden), Charles, Mary, and Catherine. Catherine later married John Rowland Smyth.

Abbott was considered cautious, with an "aversion to all that was experimental" and a "want of fancy" which were considered excellent traits for a judge, giving him "a very prominent rank indeed amongst our ablest judges". He possessed a violent disposition; "his temper was naturally bad; it was hasty and it was violent; forming a natural contrast with the rest of his mind", but he successfully controlled this. This occasionally came out in court, however, and he was noted as particularly caustic and intolerant of unnecessarily complex sentences. When one witness, an apothecary, used a particularly complex medical phrase, Abbott shouted that he should "Speak English sir, if you can, or I must swear in an interpreter". He was considered "dull in private life as well as in public; and neither crimes nor follies could ever be imputed upon him"; despite this he was "a great magistrate, and his judgments [were] studied and admired".

Edward Foss wrote of him that "no judge ever sat on the bench who displayed greater learning, cleverness and discrimination; nor whose judgments have ever been so undisputed.

== Arms ==
Coat of arms of Charles Abbott, 1st Baron Tenterden
Crest A fox statant per pale Or and Argent charged on the shoulder with a water bouget Sable. Escutcheon Purpure a pile wavy vairy Or and Gules in base two water bougets fesswise of the second on a canton Argent a crozier erect Azure. Supporters Dexter a dragon wings elevated Vert gorged with a collar of roses and portcullises alternately and charged on the wing with a water bouget Or; sinister a pelican wings elevated Or vulned and gorged with a wreath of roses Gules. Motto Labore (By Labour)

== Bibliography ==
- Brightwell, C.L. (1866). Memorials of the early lives and doings of great lawyers. T. Nelson and Sons. OCLC 60719249.
- Campbell, John (2006). The Lives of the Chief Justices of England: From the Norman Conquest till the death of Lord Tenterden. Vol. 3. Elibron Classics. ISBN 0-543-95981-3.
- Chisholm, Hugh, ed. (1911). "Tenterden, Charles Abbott, 1st Baron" . Encyclopædia Britannica. Vol. 26 (11th ed.). Cambridge University Press.
- Foss, Edward (1843). The grandeur of the law; or, The legal peers of England;. E.Spettigue. OCLC 7599534.
- Foss, Edward (2000). Biographia Juridica: A Biographical Dictionary of the Judges of England from the Conquest to the Present Time, 1066-1870. The Lawbook Exchange, Ltd. ISBN 1-886363-86-2.
- The Gentleman's magazine (1832). Lord Tenterden. Vol. 102. F. Jefferies.
- Grant, James (1837). The bench and the bar. Vol. 1. H. Colburn. OCLC 60718542.
- Macdonell, John (1885). "Abbott, Charles (1762-1832)" . In Stephen, Leslie (ed.). Dictionary of National Biography. Vol. 1. London: Smith, Elder & Co.
- Society for the Diffusion of Useful Knowledge (1842). The biographical Dictionary of the Society for the diffusion of useful Knowledge. Longmans. OCLC 18067040.
- Townsend, William C. (1846). The lives of twelve eminent judges of the last and of the present century. Longman. OCLC 60719586.

Legal offices
Preceded by The Lord Ellenborough	Lord Chief Justice, King's Bench; 1818–1832	Succeeded by Sir Thomas Denman
Political offices
Preceded by George Canning	Interim Chancellor of the Exchequer; 1827	Succeeded by John Charles Herries
Peerage of the United Kingdom
New creation	Baron Tenterden; 1827–1832	Succeeded by John Henry Abbott
