= Baron Tenterden =

Extinct barony in the Peerage of the United Kingdom

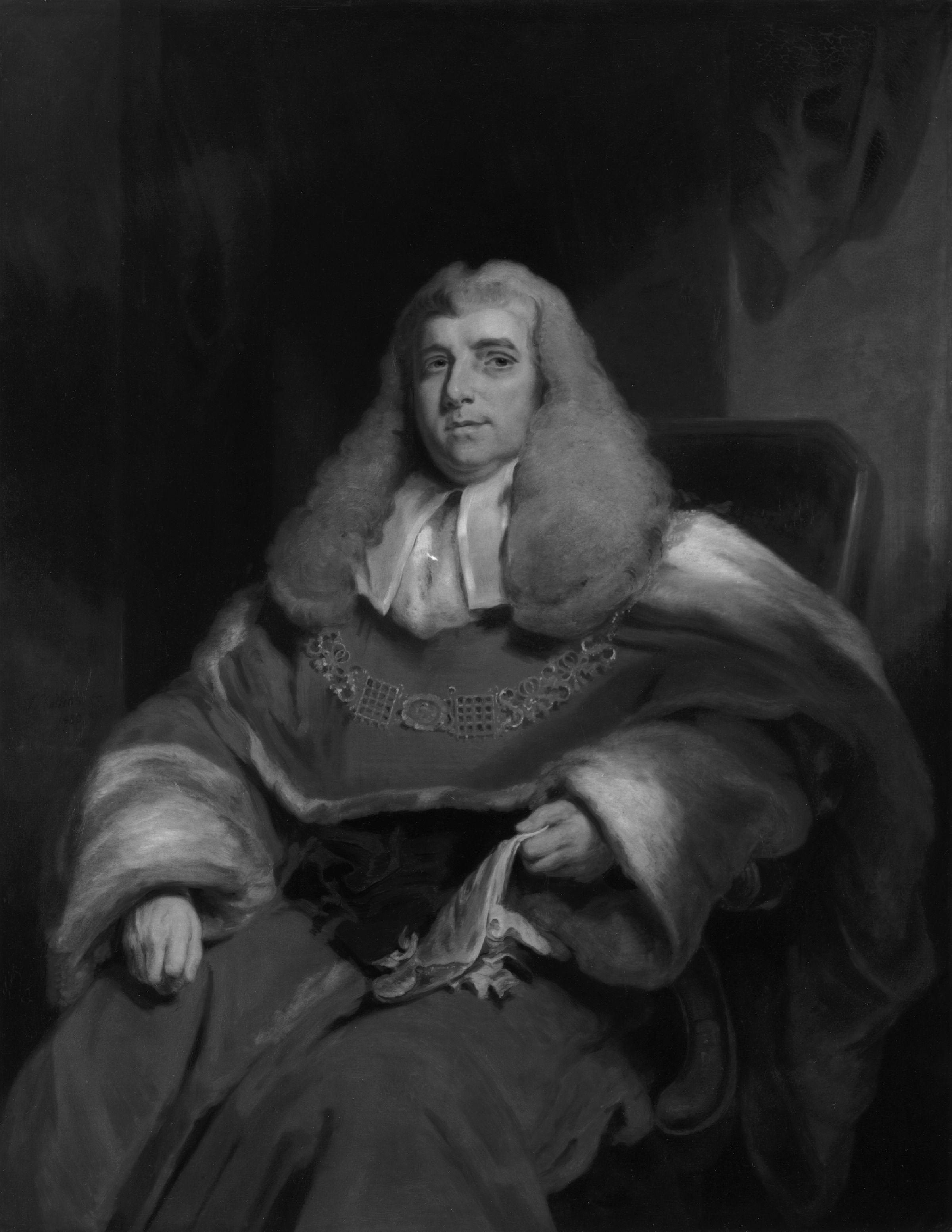
Charles Abbott, 1st Baron Tenterden.

Baron Tenterden, of Hendon in the County of Middlesex, was a title in the Peerage of the United Kingdom. It was created in 1827 for Sir Charles Abbott, Lord Chief Justice of the King's Bench from 1818 to 1832. His grandson, the third Baron (who succeeded his uncle), was Permanent Under-Secretary of State for Foreign Affairs between 1873 and 1882. The title became extinct on the death of the third Baron's son, the fourth Baron, in 1939.

== Barons Tenterden (1827) ==
- Charles Abbott, 1st Baron Tenterden (1762–1832)
- John Henry Abbott, 2nd Baron Tenterden (1796–1870)
  - Hon. Charles Abbott (1803-1838)
- Charles Stuart Aubrey Abbott, 3rd Baron Tenterden (1834–1882)
- Charles Stuart Henry Abbott, 4th Baron Tenterden (1865–1939)

== Arms ==
Coat of arms of Baron Tenterden
Crest A fox statant per pale Or and Argent charged on the shoulder with a water bouget Sable. Escutcheon Purpure a pile wavy vairy Or and Gules in base two water bougets fesswise of the second on a canton Argent a crozier erect Azure. Supporters Dexter a dragon wings elevated Vert gorged with a collar of roses and portcullises alternately and charged on the wing with a water bouget Or; sinister a pelican wings elevated Or vulned and gorged with a wreath of roses Gules. Motto Labore (By Labour)
