= Giuseppe Cammarano =

Italian painter

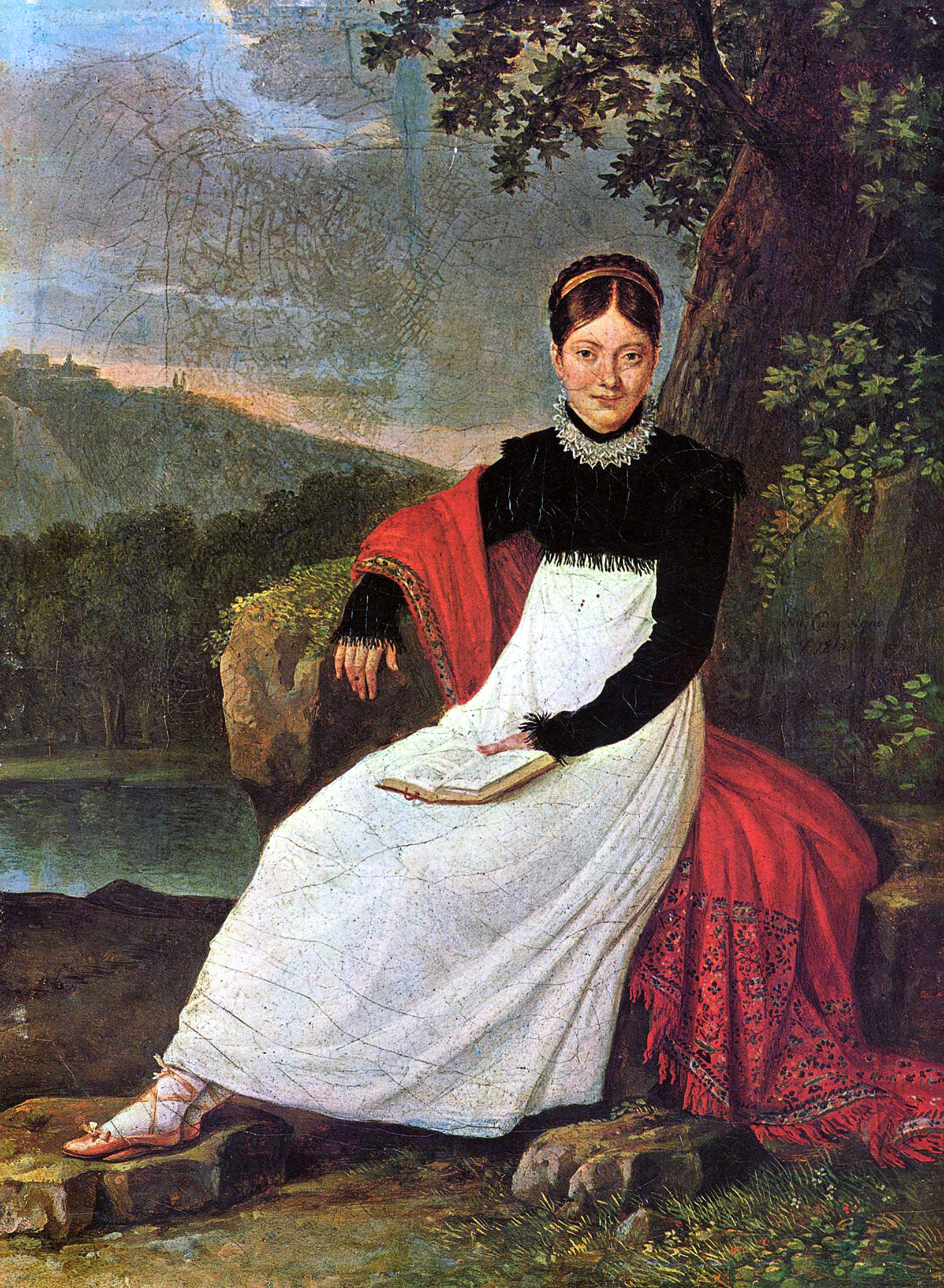
Caroline Bonaparte, the Wife of Joachim Murat

Portrait of Francis I and His Family (1820)

Giuseppe Cammarano (4 June 1766 – 8 October 1850) was an Italian painter of frescoes and portraits.

== Biography ==
He was born in Sciacca. His father, Vincenzo (1720–1809), was a comic actor known as "Giancola". While still very young, he began working at the Royal Court of Naples. His first notable works were frescoes, which have since degraded, in the Reggia di Carditello. They were inspired by the works of Fedele Fischetti, one of his teachers, and Domenico Chelli, a scenographer. These enabled him to find a patron in King Ferdinand I, who funded his studies in Rome. There, he developed a style with both Rococo and Neoclassic elements. Intending to stay for five years, illness forced him to return to Naples after only two.

Upon returning in 1788, he opened his own painting school, which he operated until 1799. Later that year, he was commissioned by the King to restore the frescoes in the Royal Palace, which had been damaged by the French troops that were sent in to quell the Neapolitan Revolution. He also applied for a position at the Reale Accademia di Belle Arti, but was not accepted. In 1806, Joseph Bonaparte appointed him to succeed Domenico Mondo as the Accademia's Deputy Director. That position was eliminated after only five months, but he remained as a "Master of Painting" until 1824.

During that time, he was entrusted with the decorations of the Royal Palace of Caserta. His most important fresco there is Minerva Awarding Prizes to Arts and Sciences, on the Ceiling of the Council Hall (1814). Also at the Palace, he created Hector Reproves Paris (1818) and, outside of what later became the bedchamber of King Francis II, he depicted the Victory of Theseus Over the Minotaur (1824). In 1827, he was allowed to share the Accademia's Chair of Drawing with Costanzo Angelini and Joseph Franque. He continued to work for the Royal Family until his retirement. A collection of his portraits of them is preserved at the Palace.

In addition to his work there, he did restorations and original frescoes at the Belvedere of San Leucio, and painted a Last Supper for the Cattedrale di San Michele Arcangelo. He acted occasionally, with other members of his family, and wrote lyric poems in the Neapolitan dialect.

His brother, Antonio, was also an artist, but, except for a few drawings, very little is known of him. His son, Salvadore, was a librettist and playwright. His grandson, Michele, took his first drawing lessons from him and became a well-known history painter. Cammarano died in Naples of typhus, aged 84.
