= Princess Maria Amalia of the Two Sicilies (born 1818) =

Princess of Bourbon-Two Sicilies

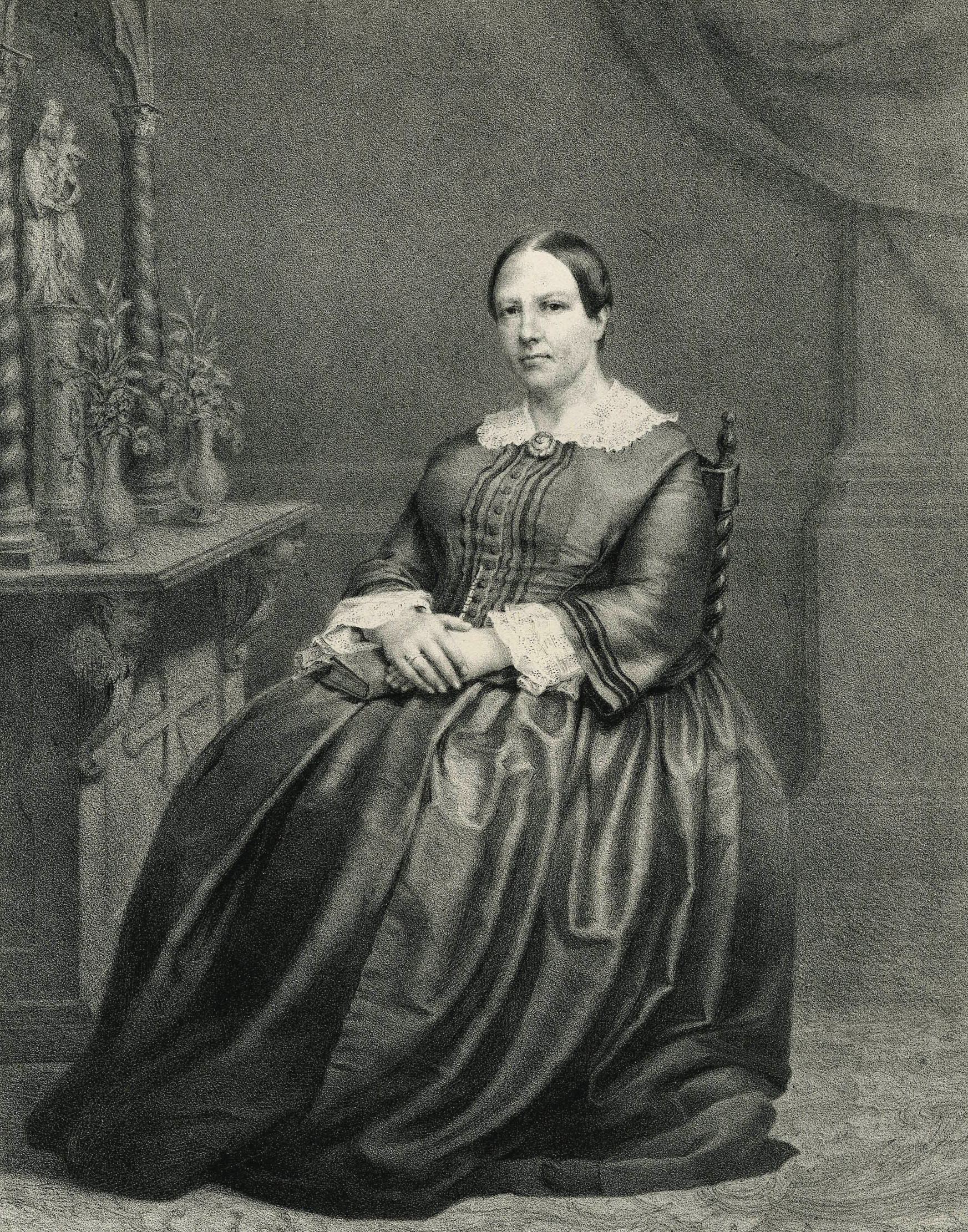
- Born: 25 February 1818; Pozzuoli, Two Sicilies
- Died: 6 November 1857 (aged 39); Madrid, Spain
- Burial: Basilica of Santa Chiara, Naples
- Spouse: Infante Sebastian of Portugal and Spain (m. 1842)
Names
- Italian: Maria Amalia Ferdinanda
- House: Bourbon-Two Sicilies
- Father: Francis I of the Two Sicilies
- Mother: Maria Isabella of Spain

Princess Maria Amalia of the Two Sicilies (Italian: Maria Amalia di Borbone, Principessa di Borbone delle Due Sicilie; 25 February 1818 in Pozzuoli, Two Sicilies – 6 November 1857 in Madrid, Spain) was a Princess of Bourbon-Two Sicilies by birth and an Infanta of Portugal and Spain through her marriage to Infante Sebastian of Portugal and Spain.

== Family ==
Maria Amalia was the tenth child of Francis I of the Two Sicilies and his wife Maria Isabella of Spain.

== Marriage ==
Maria Amalia married Infante Sebastian of Portugal and Spain, only son of Infante Pedro Carlos of Spain and Portugal and his wife Teresa, Princess of Beira, on 25 May 1842 in Madrid, Spain. The marriage remained childless.

Coat of arms of Maria Amalia marshalled with those of her husband

== Ancestry ==
Ancestors of Princess Maria Amalia of Bourbon-Two Sicilies

8. Charles III of Spain (= 12)
4. Ferdinand I of the Two Sicilies
9. Maria Amalia of Saxony (= 13)
2. Francis I of the Two Sicilies
10. Francis I, Holy Roman Emperor
5. Maria Carolina of Austria
11. Maria Theresa of Austria
1. Maria Amalia of Bourbon-Two Sicilies
12. Charles III of Spain (= 8)
6. Charles IV of Spain
13. Maria Amalia of Saxony (= 9)
3. Maria Isabella of Spain
14. Philip, Duke of Parma
7. Maria Luisa of Parma
15. Louise Élisabeth of France
