= Francis I of the Two Sicilies =

King of the Two Sicilies from 1825 to 1830

Francis I
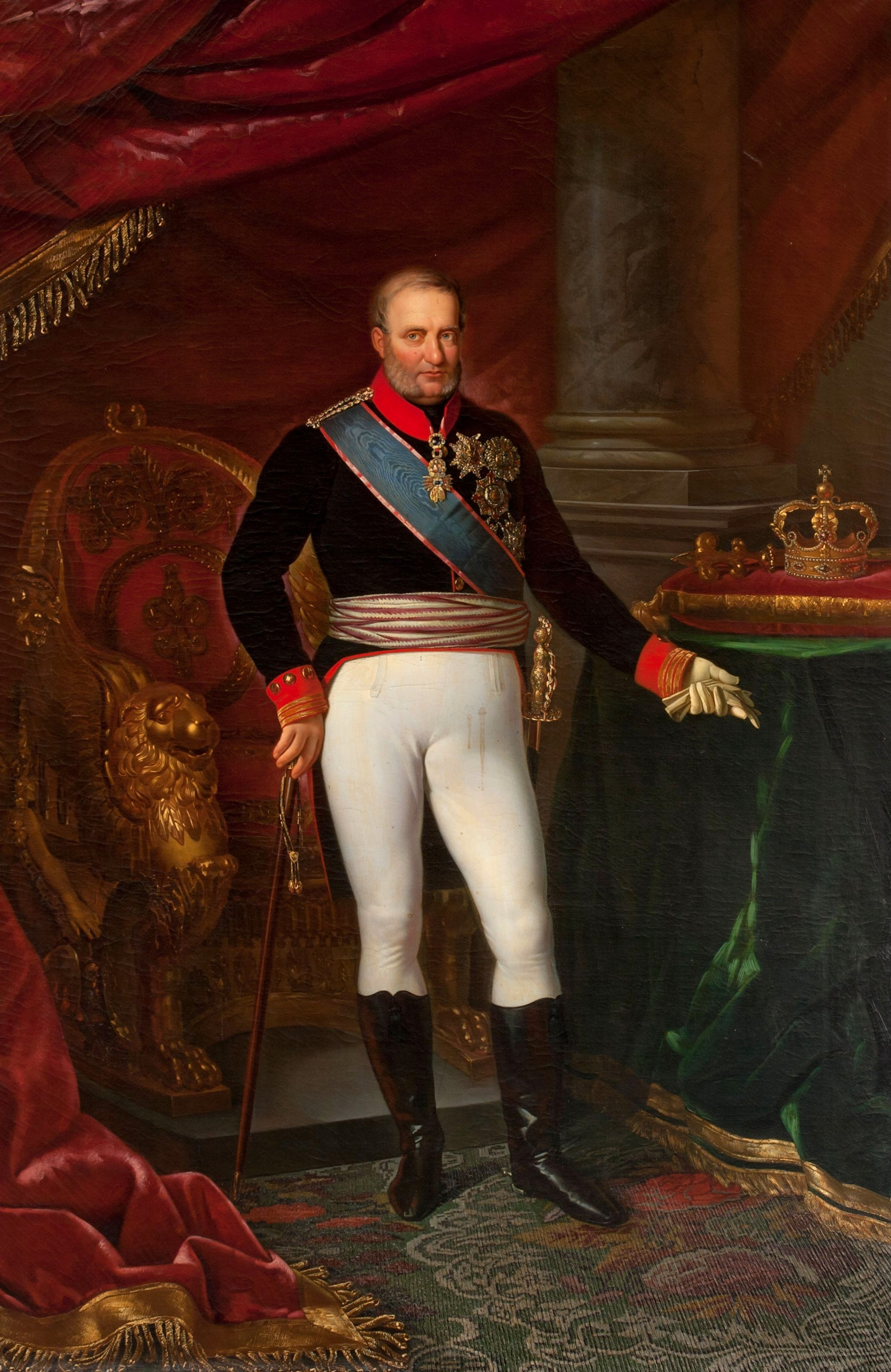
- Portrait by Carlo De Falco, c. 1828

King of the Two Sicilies
- Reign: 4 January 1825 – 8 November 1830
- Predecessor: Ferdinand I
- Successor: Ferdinand II
- Born: 19 August 1777; Royal Palace of Naples, Naples, Kingdom of Naples
- Died: 8 November 1830 (aged 53); Naples, Kingdom of the Two Sicilies
- Burial: Basilica of Santa Chiara, Naples
- Spouses: Maria Clementina of Austria (m. 1797; died 1801) Maria Isabella of Spain (m. 1802)
- Issue Detail: Maria Carolina, Duchess of Berry; Luisa Carlotta, Infanta of Spain; Maria Cristina, Queen of Spain; Ferdinand II, King of the Two Sicilies; Carlo Ferdinando, Prince of Capua; Prince Leopoldo, Count of Siracusa; Maria Antonia, Grand Duchess of Tuscany; Prince Antonio, Count of Lecce; Maria Amalia, Infanta of Portugal and Spain; Princess Maria Carolina, Countess of Montemolín; Teresa Cristina, Empress of Brazil; Prince Luigi, Count of Aquila; Prince Francesco, Count of Trapani
Names
- Italian: Francesco Gennaro Giuseppe Saverio Giovanni Battista
- House: Bourbon
- Father: Ferdinand I of the Two Sicilies
- Mother: Maria Carolina of Austria
- Religion: Catholic Church

Styles of Francis I of the Two Sicilies
- Reference style: His Majesty
- Spoken style: Your Majesty

Francis I (Italian: Francesco I; 19 August 1777 – 8 November 1830) was King of the Two Sicilies from 1825 to 1830 and regent of the Kingdom of Sicily from 1806 to 1814.

== Early life ==
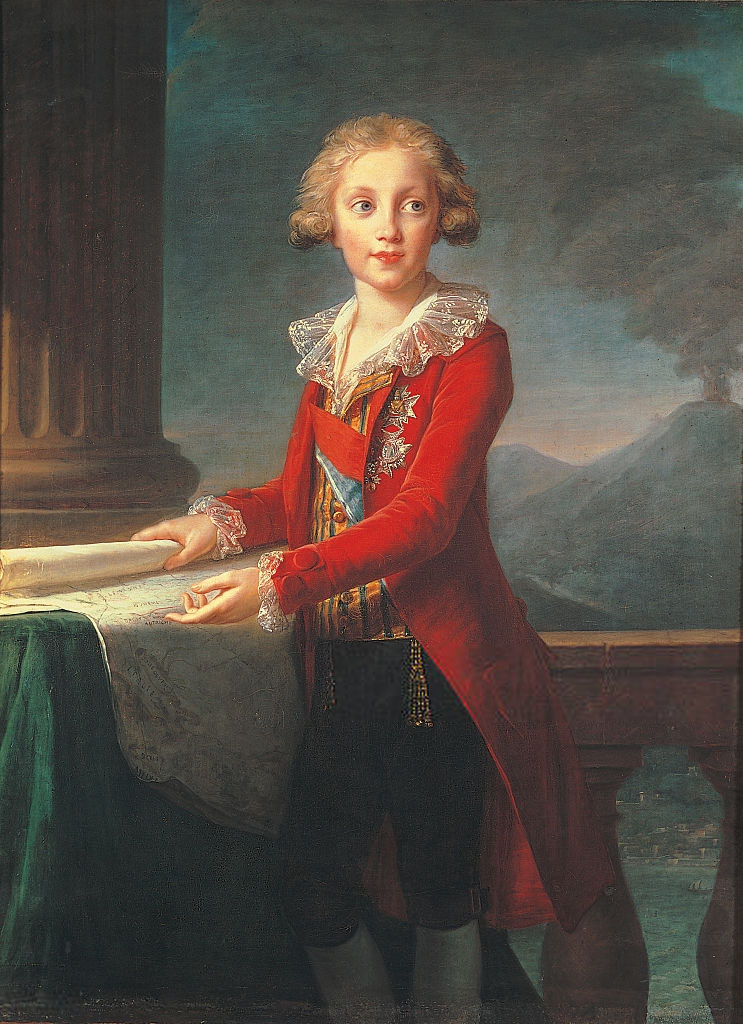
Francis in 1790. Portrait by Élisabeth Vigée Le Brun.

Francis was born the son of Ferdinand I of the Two Sicilies and his wife Archduchess Maria Carolina of Austria in Naples. He was also the nephew of Marie Antoinette and Louis XVI, the last King and Queen of France before the first French Republic, and grandson of Empress Maria Theresa, the Empress of Habsburg and Holy Roman Empress.

At the death of his older brother Carlo, Duke of Calabria in 1778, Francis became the heir-apparent to the thrones of Naples and Sicily with the title Duke of Calabria, the traditional title of the heir apparent to the Neapolitan throne.

== Later life ==
On 26 June 1797, Francis married his double first cousin Archduchess Maria Clementina of Austria, daughter of Leopold II, Holy Roman Emperor. When she died in 1801, he married his paternal first cousin María Isabella, youngest daughter of King Charles IV of Spain, on 6 July 1802. His youngest sister, Princess Maria Antonia of Naples and Sicily, also married Maria Isabella's elder brother, the future Ferdinand VII of Spain, then Prince of Asturias.

After the Bourbon family fled from Naples to Sicily in 1806, Lord William Bentinck, the British resident, had drafted a new constitution along British and French lines. Ferdinand agreed to abdicate his throne, with Francis being appointed regent in 1812.

On the abdication of Napoleon I, his father returned to Naples and suppressed the Sicilian constitution, incorporating his two kingdoms into that of the Two Sicilies (1816); Francis then assumed the revived title of duke of Calabria. While still heir apparent, he professed liberal ideas, and on the outbreak of the revolution of 1820, he accepted the regency, apparently in a friendly spirit towards the new constitution, although he was actually as conservative as his father.

On succeeding to the throne in 1825, he pursued a conservative course. He took little part in the government, which he left in the hands of favourites and police officials, and lived with his mistresses, surrounded by soldiers, ever in dread of assassination. During his reign, the only revolutionary movement was the outbreak on the Cilento (1828), repressed by the Marquis Delcarretto, an ex-Liberal. He was, however, successful in having the Austrian occupation force withdrawn (1827), thereby relieving a large financial burden on the treasury.

During his reign, the Royal Order of Francis I was founded to reward civil merit.

== Issue ==
With Maria Clementina of Austria:

- Maria Carolina (1798–1870), who married, firstly, Charles Ferdinand, Duke of Berry, the second son of King Charles X of France; and secondly, Ettore Count Lucchesi Palli, Prince di Campofranco, Duke della Grazia.
- Ferdinando, Duke of Noto (27 August 1800 – 1 July 1801) died in infancy.

With Isabella of Spain:

- Luisa Carlotta (1804–1844), who married her mother's younger brother Infante Francisco de Paula of Spain.
- María Cristina (1806–1878), who married firstly her uncle Ferdinand VII of Spain (her mother's older brother); and secondly, Ferdinand Muñoz, Duke of Rianzares.
- Ferdinand II of the Two Sicilies (1810–1859), who became Francis I's successor and married twice.
- Carlo Ferdinando, Prince of Capua (1811–1862), who morganatically wed Penelope Smyth and had issue.
- Leopoldo Beniamino, Count of Syracuse (1813–1860), who married Princess Maria Filiberta of Savoy. Had no surviving issue.
- Maria Antonia (1814–1898) who married Leopold II, Grand Duke of Tuscany.
- Antonio Pasquale, Count of Lecce (1816–1843).
- Maria Amalia (1818–1857), who married Infante Sebastian of Portugal and Spain.
- Maria Carolina (1820–1861), who married Don Carlos de Bourbon, Count of Montemolin, Carlist pretender to the throne of Spain.
- Teresa Cristina (1822–1889), who married Emperor Pedro II of Brazil.
- Luigi Carlo, Count of Aquila (1824–1897), who married Januária, Princess Imperial of Brazil (sister of Pedro II of Brazil and Maria II of Portugal). Had issue.
- Francesco di Paola, Count of Trapani (1827–1892), who married Archduchess Maria Isabella of Austria, Princess of Tuscany, and had issue.

== Ancestry ==
Ancestors of Francis I of the Two Sicilies

8. Philip V of Spain
4. Charles III of Spain
9. Elisabeth Farnese
2. Ferdinand I of the Two Sicilies
10. Augustus III of Poland
5. Maria Amalia of Saxony
11. Maria Josepha of Austria
1. Francis I of the Two Sicilies
12. Leopold, Duke of Lorraine
6. Francis I, Holy Roman Emperor
13. Élisabeth Charlotte of Orléans
3. Maria Carolina of Austria
14. Charles VI, Holy Roman Emperor
7. Maria Theresa of Austria
15. Elisabeth Christine of Brunswick

Francis I of the Two Sicilies House of Bourbon-Two Sicilies Cadet branch of the House of Bourbon Born: 19 August 1777 Died: 8 November 1830
Regnal titles
| Preceded by Ferdinand I | King of the Two Sicilies; 4 January 1825 – 8 November 1830 | Succeeded by Ferdinand II |
