= Prince Antonio, Count of Lecce =

Prince Antonio
- Count of Lecce
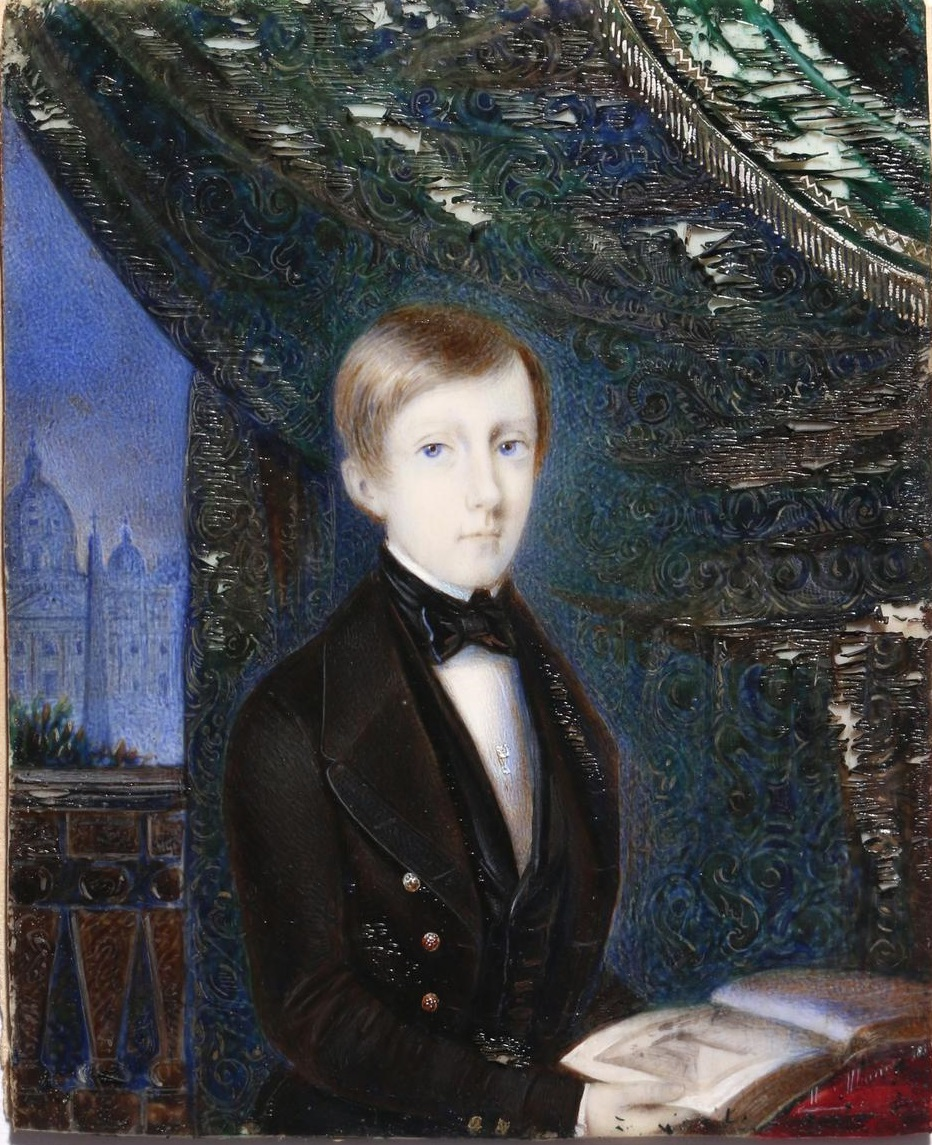
- Portrait by Michele Albanes, 1830s
- Born: 23 September 1816; Palermo
- Died: 12 January 1843 (aged 26); Pozzuoli
- Burial: Basilica of Santa Chiara, Naples
Names
- Italian: Antonio Pasquale di Borbone, Principe di Borbone delle Due Sicilie
- House: Bourbon-Two Sicilies
- Father: Francis I of the Two Sicilies
- Mother: Maria Isabella of Spain

Prince Antonio of the Two Sicilies (23 September 1816 – 12 January 1843) was a son of Francis I of the Two Sicilies and a brother of Ferdinand II King of the Two Sicilies. Known by his title of Count of Lecce, he was killed at age 26.

== Life ==
Antonio, Count of Lecce was the fourth son of King Francis I of the Two Sicilies and his second wife Maria Isabella of Spain. He was born on 23 September 1816 at Palermo, during the reign of his paternal grandfather, Ferdinand I of the Two Sicilies who gave him the title of Count of Lecce. In 1830 the Count of Lecce accompanied his parents in their long trip to Spain, Italy and France when his sister Maria Christina married King Ferdinand VII of Spain. His father died few months after their return to Naples.

During the reign of his brother King Ferdinand II, Antonio quickly became known for his restless behavior. By age sixteen in 1832, he was already a consummate womanizer. In 1837, Ferdinand II arranged his marriage to Louise Marie Thérèse d'Artois, his niece, a daughter of his half sister Caroline, Duchess of Berry. The marriage negotiation failed as the Duchess of Angoulême opposed the union.

By 1842 Antonio, only twenty six, had been of frail health after overcoming repeated attacks of paralyses. On top of that, he contracted cholera from which he also recovered. He had a small house at Giugliano that he used for his romantic adventures. His lifestyle ultimately caught up with him. He was clubbed to death on 12 January 1843 by the jealous husband of a married woman he had tried to seduce. The crime was not made public to avoid a scandal.

== Ancestry ==
Ancestors of Prince Antonio, Count of Lecce

8. Charles III of Spain (= 12)
4. Ferdinand I of the Two Sicilies
9. Maria Amalia of Saxony (= 13)
2. Francis I of the Two Sicilies
10. Francis I, Holy Roman Emperor
5. Maria Carolina of Austria
11. Maria Theresa of Austria
1. Prince Antonio, Count of Lecce
12. Charles III of Spain (= 8)
6. Charles IV of Spain
13. Maria Amalia of Saxony (= 9)
3. Maria Isabella of Spain
14. Philip, Duke of Parma
7. Maria Luisa of Parma
15. Louise Élisabeth of France
