= Carlo Ferdinando, Prince of Capua =

Prince Charles
- Prince of Capua
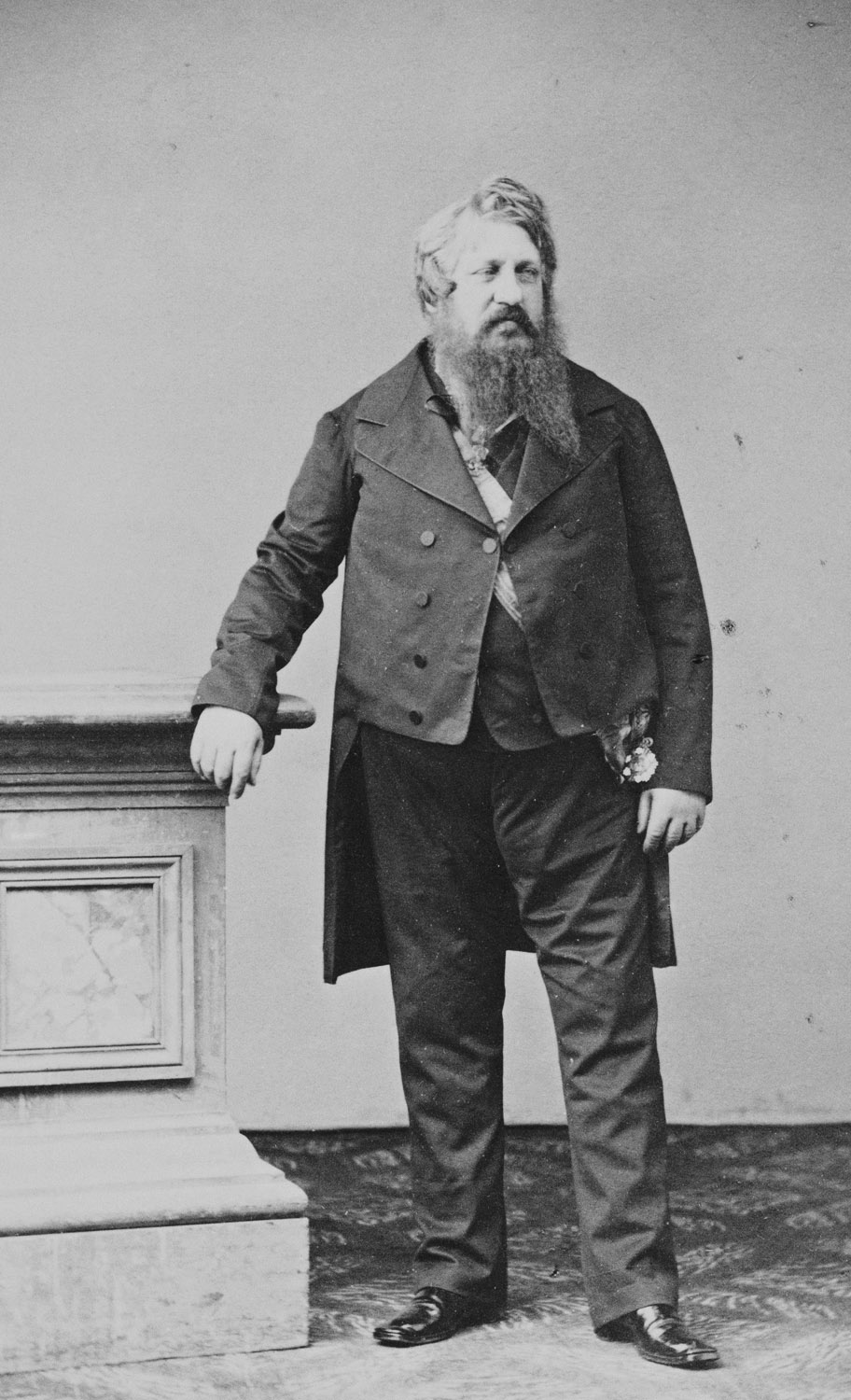
- Charles Ferdinand c. 1862
- Born: 10 November 1811; Palermo, Kingdom of Sicily
- Died: 22 April 1862 (aged 50); Turin, Kingdom of Italy
- Spouse: Penelope Smyth (m. 1836)
- Issue: Francesco, Count of Mascali; Vittoria, Countess of Mascali
Names
- Carlo Ferdinando
- House: Bourbon-Two Sicilies
- Father: Francis I of the Two Sicilies
- Mother: Maria Isabella of Spain

Prince Charles of the Two Sicilies, Prince of Capua (Full Italian name: Carlo Ferdinando, Principe di Borbone delle Due Sicilie, Principe di Capua) (10 November 1811 – 22 April 1862 in Turin, Kingdom of Italy) was the second son of Francis I of the Two Sicilies and his second wife, Maria Isabella of Spain. He contracted a morganatic marriage in 1836 and had to live for the rest of his life in exile.

== Early life ==
Charles was the second-eldest son of Francis I of the Two Sicilies and his second wife Maria Isabella of Spain. Frivolous and more outgoing than his eldest brother, King Ferdinand II, he was his parents' favorite. Ferdinand II resented that fact, and the relationship between the two brothers was strained.

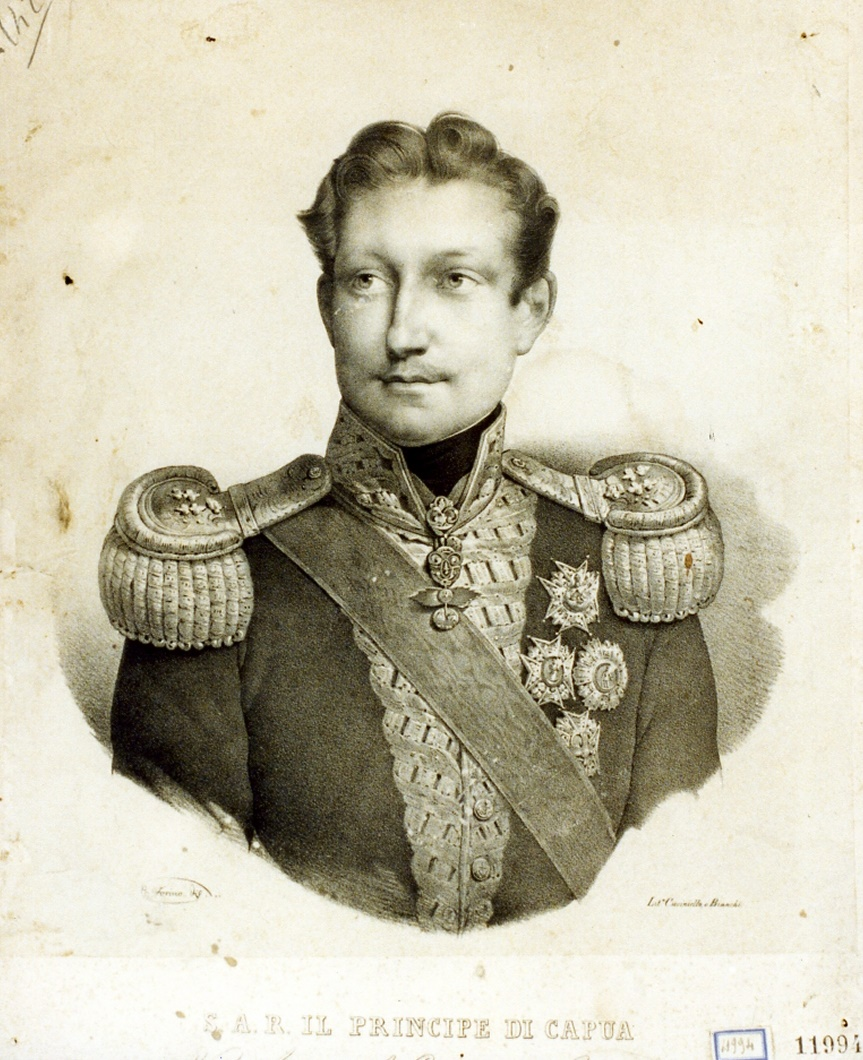
Charles as a young man

At age 19, Charles was named Vice-Admiral. Between March and June 1829, the Neapolitan government put forward his candidature to the Greek throne, which fell through by Metternich's opposition. In 1831 he was a candidate to become King of Belgium. In his youth, the Prince of Capua displayed a restless behaviour and a weakness for pretty women. As his brother had yet to produce children, Charles held a high position at court as heir presumptive to the crown until 1836.

During the winter of 1835, the Prince of Capua fell in love with Penelope Smyth, the younger daughter of Grice Smyth (1762-1816), Esquire of Ballynatray House, Co. Waterford, Ireland, and sister of Sir John Rowland Smyth, a beautiful Anglo-Irish woman visiting Naples. Ferdinand II forbade their union, as it would be a morganatic marriage. On 12 January 1836 the couple eloped. Ferdinand II forfeited his brother's income, denounced Charles's departure as illegal and tried to prevent the marriage.

On 12 March 1836, King Ferdinand II of the Two Sicilies, issued a decree upholding the 1829 decision of the brothers' late father, King Francis I of the Two Sicilies, that members of the blood-royal of the kingdom whatever their age were required to obtain the consent of the sovereign to marry, and marriages made without this consent were to be deemed to be null and void.

== Exile ==
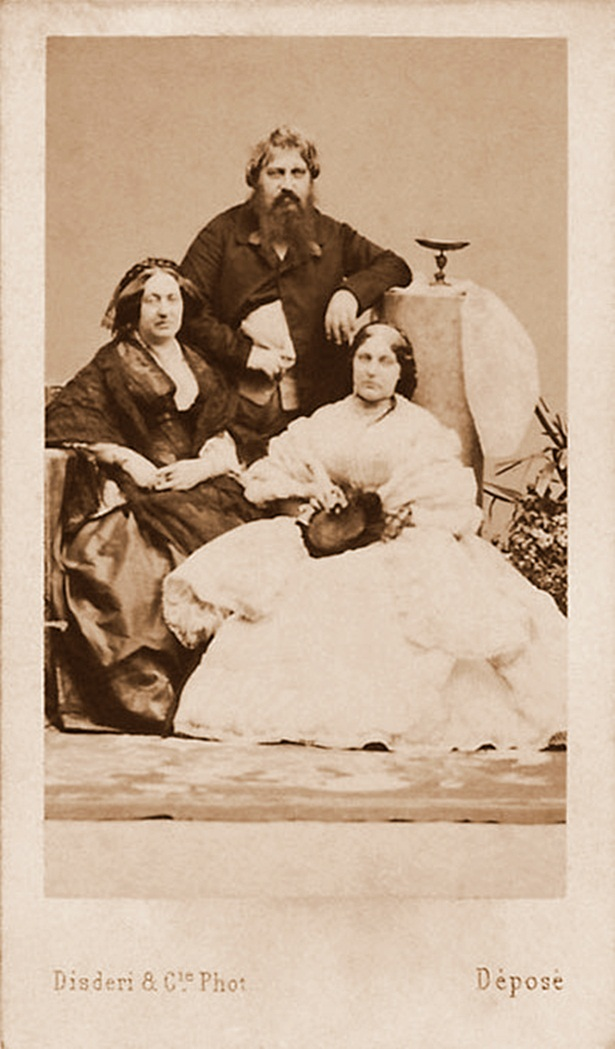
The Prince of Capua with his wife, The Countess of Mascali, and their daughter, Vittoria.

Defying his brother's will, Charles married morganatically Penelope Smyth on 5 April 1836 in Gretna Green, the first stagecoach stop in Scotland after the border city of Carlisle. It was a popular place for young lovers to marry since it was sufficient there for couples to declare their wish to marry before witnesses, and residence requirement or parental consent was not needed.

Later, Charles applied for special license from the Archbishop of Canterbury to marry (or remarry) Miss Smyth at St George's, Hanover Square. In the court order, they were described as a bachelor and a spinster respectively. The King's Envoy Extraordinary and Minister Plenipotentiary, Count de Ludolf, objected to the grant of the licence and a hearing took place in the Court of Faculties on 4 May 1836. The Master of the Faculties, Dr John Nicholl, refused to grant the licence on the grounds that the royal succession might be affected by the non-recognition of the marriage in Naples. Banns of Marriage were read for the final time in St George's, Hanover Square, on 8 May 1836.

The Prince of Capua and Penelope had two children:

- Francesco, Conte di Mascali (24 March 1837 – 2 June 1862)
- Vittoria Augusta di Borbone, Contessa di Mascali (15 May 1838 – 9 August 1895)

Ferdinand II never forgave his runaway brother. Charles was forced to live for the rest of his life in exile. He remained loyal to his wife, but all of his estates were confiscated except the county of Mascali in Sicily, which he had inherited from his father. As Mascali was not run efficiently, it provided just a small revenue and the prince had to live modestly. For years, Charles tried to obtain a pardon from his brother and be allowed to return to Naples but to no avail. He had to settle in London at the expense of his wife and her relatives and accumulated debts.

The government of Lord Palmerston tried to intervene in his favour as a counterbalance to Ferdinand II's despotism. In 1848, Charles aspired in vain to the crown of Sicily. When Palmerston got tired of him, Charles moved to Turin. Pursued by his creditors the prince moved constantly.

A contemporary who met him in the Tuileries Palace in 1853 described him as follows: "The Prince is stout, vulgar, and usually rigged up like a rustic charlatan. He is adorned with a long and dirty grey beard, and his hair is also long, dirty and grey".

When his brother Ferdinand II died on 22 May 1859, Charles's hopes were raised. Ferdinand II bequeathed him a small amount of money, and the new King Francis II, his nephew, ordered the restoration of all of his income and property. However, Charles, who moved between Geneva, Spa and Aix les Bains with his wife and their two adolescent children, did not see any of it. The following year, the Bourbons were overthrown. With the Piedmontese invasion, everything was confiscated by Giuseppe Garibaldi.

Charles was offered an allowance by King Victor Emanuel II, but he rejected it for fear that it would affect further claims.

== Death ==
Prince Charles Ferdinand died on 21 April 1862 at Turin, aged 50. His son, Count Francesco Ferdinando Carlo di Mascali, who suffered from mental illness, died a few months later. His widow, Penelope, received a pension and a villa near Lucca.

== Honours ==
- Knight of the Order of Saint Januarius
- Knight of the Spanish Order of the Golden Fleece (1826)
- Knight Grand Cross of the Order of Saint Ferdinand and of Merit
- Knight of the Order of the Holy Spirit

== Ancestry ==
Ancestors of Carlo Ferdinando, Prince of Capua

8. Charles III of Spain (= 12)
4. Ferdinand I of the Two Sicilies
9. Maria Amalia of Saxony (= 13)
2. Francis I of the Two Sicilies
10. Francis I, Holy Roman Emperor
5. Maria Carolina of Austria
11. Maria Theresa of Austria
1. Charles Ferdinand, Prince of Capua
12. Charles III of Spain (= 8)
6. Charles IV of Spain
13. Maria Amalia of Saxony (= 9)
3. Maria Isabella of Spain
14. Philip, Duke of Parma
7. Maria Luisa of Parma
15. Louise Élisabeth of France
