= William Charles Townsend =

- Born: 1803; Walton, Lancashire, England
- Died: May 8, 1850; Wandsworth Common, Surrey, England
- Education: The Queen's College, Oxford
- Alma mater: University of Oxford
- Occupation(s): Barrister, legal writer, historian
- Known for: Historical and legal writings

William Charles Townsend (1803–1850) was an English barrister, known as a historical and legal writer.

== Life ==
He was the second son of William Townsend of Walton, Lancashire, and matriculated at The Queen's College, Oxford, on 4 July 1820, graduating B.A. in 1824 and M.A. in 1827. On 25 November 1828 he was called to the bar at Lincoln's Inn.

Townsend first attached himself to the northern circuit, and then practised at the Cheshire and Manchester assizes. Later he obtained a practice on the North Wales circuit. In 1833 he was elected recorder of Macclesfield. In March 1850 he was appointed a queen's counsel, and in the same year became a bencher of Lincoln's Inn. He died shortly, on 8 May at Burntwood Lodge, Wandsworth Common, the house of his elder brother Richard Lateward Townsend, vicar of All Saints', Wandsworth, Surrey. He was buried in the vaults of Lincoln's Inn.

== Works ==
Townsend wrote:

- The Pæan of Orford, a poem, London, 1826.
- The History and Memoirs of the House of Commons, London, 1843–4.
- The Lives of Twelve Eminent Judges of the Last and of the Present Century, London, 1846.
- Modern State Trials revised and illustrated, London, 1850.

He also contributed poems to Henry Fisher's Imperial Magazine, around 1820.

== Family ==
In 1834 Townsend married Frances, second daughter of Richard Wood of Macclesfield, who survived him; he died without issue.

== Notes ==
Attribution

This article incorporates text from a publication now in the public domain: Lee, Sidney, ed. (1899). "Townsend, William Charles". Dictionary of National Biography. Vol. 57. London: Smith, Elder & Co.
