= María Isabel of Spain =

Queen of the Two Sicilies from 1825 to 1830

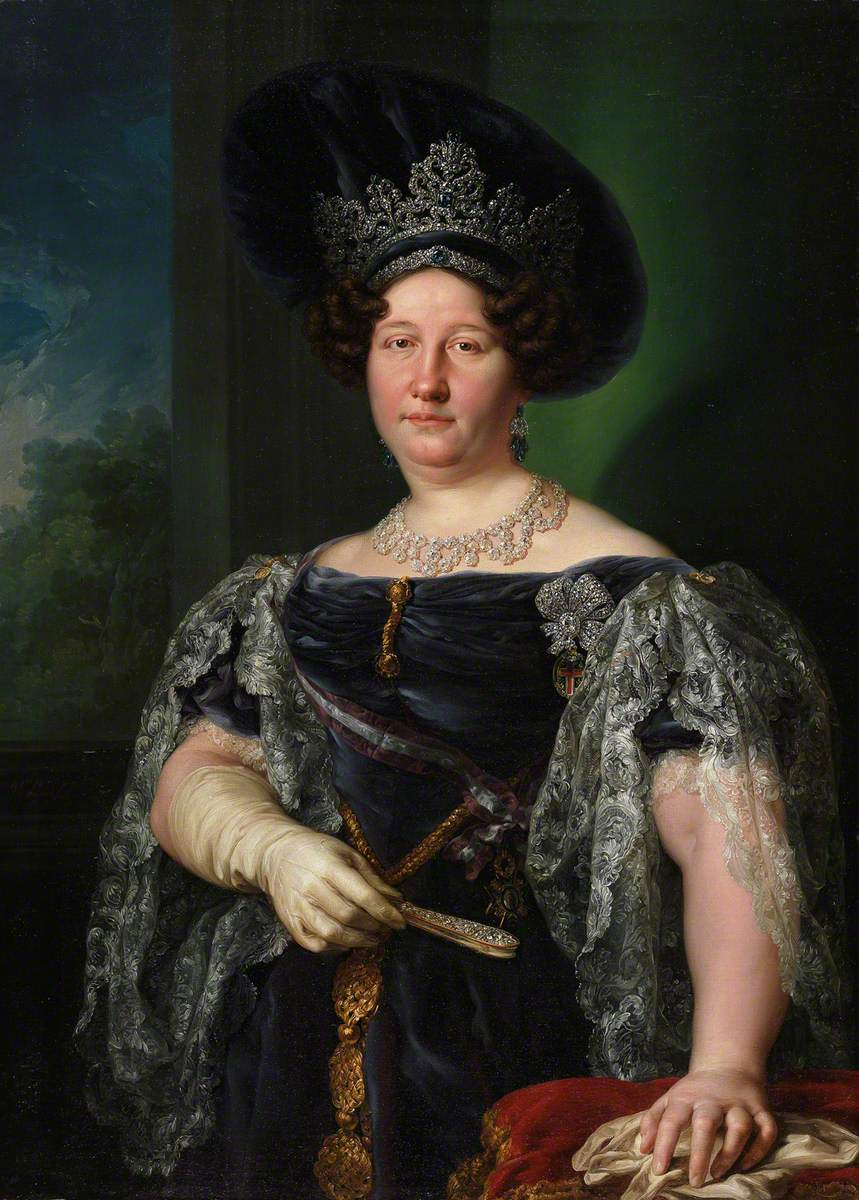
- Portrait by Vicente López y Portaña, c. 1831

Queen consort of the Two Sicilies
- Tenure: 4 January 1825 – 8 November 1830
- Born: 6 July 1789; Royal Palace of Madrid, Spain
- Died: 13 September 1848 (aged 59); Palace of Portici, Two Sicilies
- Burial: Basilica di Santa Chiara
- Spouses: Francis I of the Two Sicilies (m. 1802; died 1830) Count Francesco dal Balzo dei Duchi di Presenzano (m. 1839)
- Issue: Luisa Carlota, Infanta of Spain; Maria Cristina, Queen of Spain; Ferdinand II of the Two Sicilies; Carlo Ferdinando, Prince of Capua; Prince Leopoldo, Count of Syracuse; Maria Antonia, Grand Duchess of Tuscany; Prince Antonio, Count of Lecce; Maria Amalia, Infanta of Portugal and Spain; Maria Carolina, Countess of Montemolín; Teresa Cristina, Empress of Brazil; Prince Luigi, Count of Aquila; Prince Francesco, Count of Trapani
Names
- Spanish: María Isabel Antonia Josefa Ana Filipina de Borbón y Borbón-Parma
- House: Bourbon
- Father: Charles IV of Spain
- Mother: Maria Luisa of Parma

María Isabel of Spain (Spanish: María Isabel de Borbón y Borbón-Parma; 6 July 1789 – 13 September 1848) was Queen of the Two Sicilies from 4 January 1825 until 8 November 1830 as the wife of Francis I of the Two Sicilies.

María Isabel was the youngest daughter of King Charles IV of Spain and Maria Luisa of Parma, the second daughter of Philip, Duke of Parma, and Louise-Élisabeth of France, and thus a granddaughter of King Louis XV and Queen Marie Leszczyńska. María Isabel's siblings included King Ferdinand VII of Spain, Carlota Joaquina, Queen of Portugal, and the Count of Molina.

María Isabel was born into political turmoil, coinciding with the events of the French Revolution and the rise of Manuel Godoy. She received a rudimentary education and was featured in the painting Charles IV of Spain and His Family, painted by Francisco Goya.

Considered by her mother as a potential Empress of France, María Isabel instead married her cousin Prince Francesco, Duke of Calabria, later King Francis I of the Two Sicilies, and had many children. The family was forced to flee to Sicily in early 1806 when after several attempted invasions by Joachim Murat, brother-in-law of Emperor Napoleon, who had already succeeded in becoming King of Naples. However, they were returned to the mainland in Naples with the intervention of the British military.

In 1812, her husband was appointed regent for his elderly father and in 1825, the old king died, making María Isabel Queen consort of the Two Sicilies. She was known for her frivolity, and kept an active correspondence with her family in Spain, later marrying a young nobleman of the House of Baux. She died in 1848 at the age of 59; many of her children making marriages to their Spanish and Portuguese relatives.

== Infanta of Spain ==
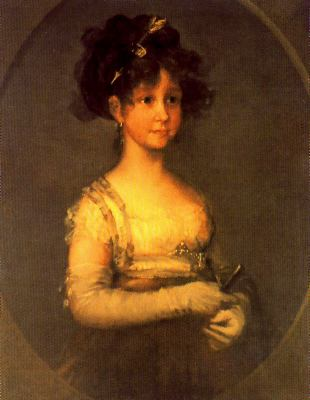
Portrait of Infanta María Isabel by Francisco Goya

She was the youngest daughter of King Carlos IV of Spain and his wife Maria Luisa of Parma a granddaughter of King Louis XV and his popular wife Queen Marie Leszczyńska. María Isabel's birth coincided with the rise to power in Spain of her mother's favorite, Manuel Godoy. Court rumour attributed María Isabel's paternity not to the king, but to the young Godoy, who became Spain's prime minister in 1792.

The Infanta's childhood coincided with the events of the French revolution and political turbulence in Spain. The youngest surviving daughter in a large family, María Isabel was spoilt by both of her parents and her education was rudimentary. She and her family members were painted by Francisco Goya in his 1800–1801 portrait Charles IV of Spain and His Family.

In December 1800, Lucien Bonaparte arrived in Spain as the new French ambassador. Through him, Queen Maria Luisa offered María Isabel in marriage to Napoleon Bonaparte in April 1801. Then First Consul, Napoleon had been married to Joséphine de Beauharnais for two years, but it had been suggested that he should divorce her to marry a princess of royal blood. Napoleon had a low opinion of the House of Bourbon and commented privately, "If I would have to remarry, I wouldn't look in a house in ruins for my descendants"

== Marriage ==
Anxious to find a crown for María Isabel, in the spring 1801, her mother looked to marry her to her paternal first cousin the Duke of Calabria, Prince Francesco of Naples and Sicily, whose wife, Archduchess Maria Clementina of Austria, was then still alive, but died of consumption in November of that year.

The idea came from the French diplomat Alquier, who had been ambassador in Madrid and Naples. His plan was to bring the Kingdom of Naples, an ally of England and hostile to France, into the recently formed Spanish-French alliance, proposing a closer relationship between the two families through double marriages. Infanta María Isabel and her eldest brother, Fernando, Prince of Asturias, would marry their first cousins: Princess Maria Antonia of Naples and Sicily and Prince Francesco, Duke of Calabria. The Queen, Maria Carolina of Austria, who hated France and mistrusted Spain for its good will toward Napoleon, opposed the match. Infanta María Isabel was only twelve years old; even at a time when princesses married very young, she was unusually so for a bride. But her early marriage was justified by the need to secure the hasty resumption of close relations between Spain and Naples at a particularly critical time for the European courts, struggling with the expansionist policy of Napoleon.

The contracts of the two marriages were signed in Aranjuez in April 1802. On 6 July 1802, her thirteenth birthday, María Isabel married in Madrid her 25-year-old cousin, Francesco by proxy, as his second wife. Her brother Ferdinand stood in the ceremony in place of the groom. The Spanish royal family traveled to Barcelona on 13 August. The two couples were married in person on 4 October at the arrival of Francesco and his sister. The festivities lasted until 12 October when María Isabel, in Italian Maria Isabella, left Barcelona towards Naples.

== Duchess of Calabria ==
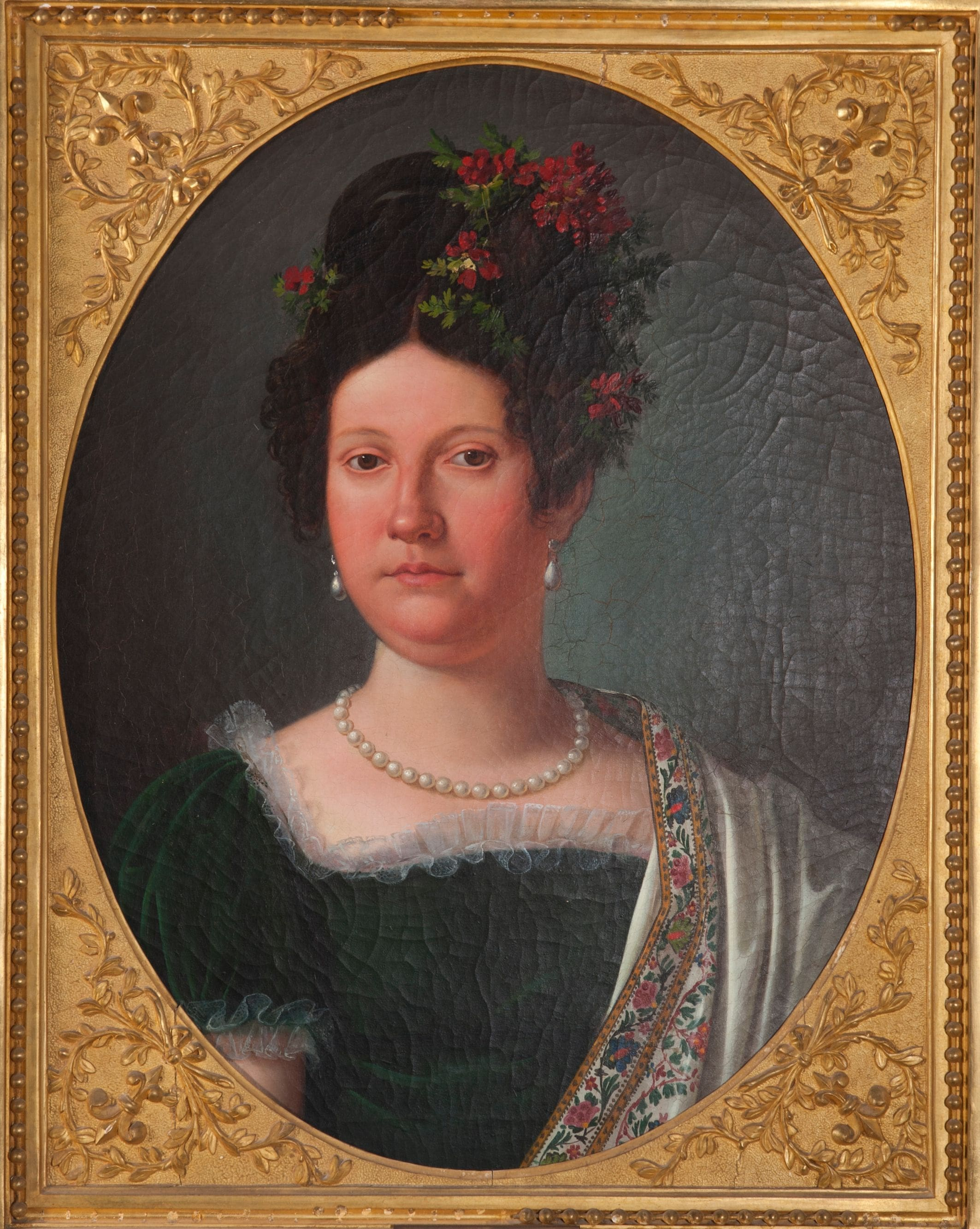
María Isabel, Duchess of Calabria, by Giuseppe Cammarano

María Isabel did not evoke a good impression upon her arrival at the court of Naples. All four daughters of Charles IV (Carlota Joaquina, María Amalia, María Luisa and María Isabel) were short and plain. María Isabel had regular features and was relatively better-looking compared to Carlota Joaquina and Maria Amalia, but she looked even younger than her thirteen years. She was described as "little, and round as a ball". Her mother-in-law, Queen Maria Carolina, had been close to her son's first wife, who was also her niece. She had an unfavorable first impression of the young María Isabel, about whom she wrote:

A fine, fresh, healthy face, not Bourbon in the least, but white and red, with black eyes. She is very stout and sturdy, yet her legs are very short. So much for her exterior. The rest cannot be described because I myself cannot understand it. She is null in every respect, knowledge, ideas, curiosity. Nothing, absolutely nothing. She speaks a little Spanish but neither Italian nor French, and only monosyllables, Yes or No, indiscriminately. She smiles all the time, whether she is pleased or not...Francis's child aged four has far more intelligence. Francis has engaged masters to teach her Italian and the rudiments of geography and arithmetic. She knows nothing except a little piano. I have tried to praise and enliven her. She feels nothing; she laughs. She is an automaton which might acquire certain attitudes but never real maturity. Were I the ambitious, intriguing woman I am said to be, I should be enchanted to have such a daughter in law who will never become anything, but I am too conscientious for that. I tried every means to mold her as a companion for her husband, even if this may turn her against myself. Believe me this child is a tight present, for she will neither ennoble nor improve our race. All the numerous Spanish clique, all their projects and schemes, have received a knock out blow by the arrival of this Princess and her perfect nullity.

She was only fifteen years old when her first daughter, Luisa Carlotta, was born in Portici on 24 October 1804. She also had a step-daughter, Princess Carolina, who would marry the French-born Charles Ferdinand, Duke of Berry (the second son of the future King Charles X of France).

María Isabel's life was deeply marked by Napoleon's actions. Fearing for his crown, King Ferdinand joined the Third Coalition against Bonaparte. Napoleon's troops defeated the allied armies at the Battle of Austerlitz in December 1805 and the Neapolitan corps at Campo Tenese. Following these victories, Napoleon's forces occupied Naples in 1806. The Emperor gave the crown of Naples to his brother Joseph Bonaparte, and four years later to his brother-in-law Joachim Murat.

María Isabel, with the rest of the royal family, had to flee from Naples to Sicily in February 1806. In a letter to her daughter, the Empress of Austria, Maria Carolina relates how exasperated she felt at the apathy of Isabel, the Princess Royal, who while the preparations for embarkation were going on and everyone else was in the deepest grief, seemed to feel nothing: "She is just like a log, understanding and feeling nothing, as unconcerned as if nothing was the matter."

Despite successive attempts by Murat to invade the island, King Ferdinand and Maria Carolina held their status and power in Sicily under the protection of British troops, but would be unable to challenge French control of the Italian mainland. The real power in Sicily was held by Lord William Bentinck, commander of British troops on the island. The king spent the following years hunting, appearing at Palermo only when his presence was required.

In 1812, Francesco, María Isabel's husband, was appointed regent. María Isabel did not get involved in the complex Sicilian affairs of the Neapolitan court in exile in Palermo. Francesco clashed with the aristocracy of the island who opposed new taxes to finance the war against France, claiming a high degree of autonomy. Queen Maria Carolina was exiled to her homeland Austria in 1813, where she died in 1814.

== Return to Naples ==
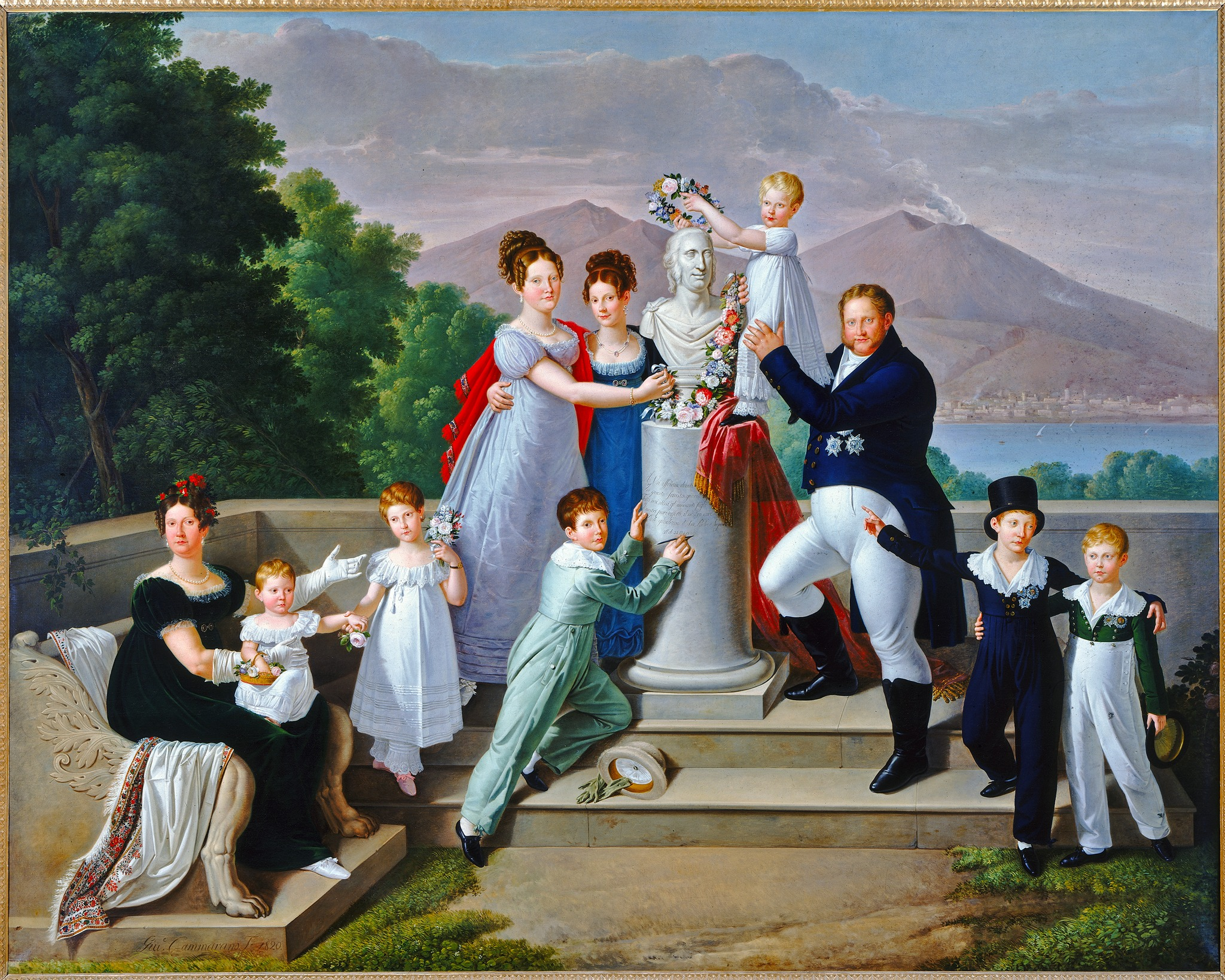
Francis and María Isabel's family in 1820; she is at the far left, holding Maria Carolina Ferdinanda.

In 1815, under Austrian protection, Ferdinand returned to Naples. He suppressed the Sicilian constitution and joined his two kingdoms into that of the Two Sicilies in 1816, bestowing on Francesco the title of Duke of Calabria as heir of the combined kingdoms. Serving as lieutenant in Sicily (1815–20), Francesco and María Isabel remained in Sicily, seldom visiting Naples.

Although she left Spain at an early age, María Isabel remained attached to her family and native country. In the autumn of 1818, she visited her parents who were living in exile in Rome. She was still with her mother when Queen Maria Luisa died in January 1819. María Isabel was instrumental in the marital choices of the Neapolitan court for her daughters, of whom four (out of six) married members of the Spanish royal family. The first of these marriages took place in April 1819 between her eldest child Luisa Carlotta and María Isabel's younger brother, Infante Francisco de Paula of Spain in a union between niece and uncle.

During these troubled years María Isabel was constantly pregnant. At intervals of less than two years, she gave birth to nine children born in Palermo. She finally returned to Naples with her husband in July 1820. Her father-in-law King Ferdinand was now completely subservient to Austria; an Austrian, Count Nugent, was commander-in-chief of the army. For the next four years her father-in-law reigned as an absolute monarch within his domain, granting no constitutional reforms. In this period, María Isabel had two more children born in Naples.

== Queen of the Two Sicilies ==
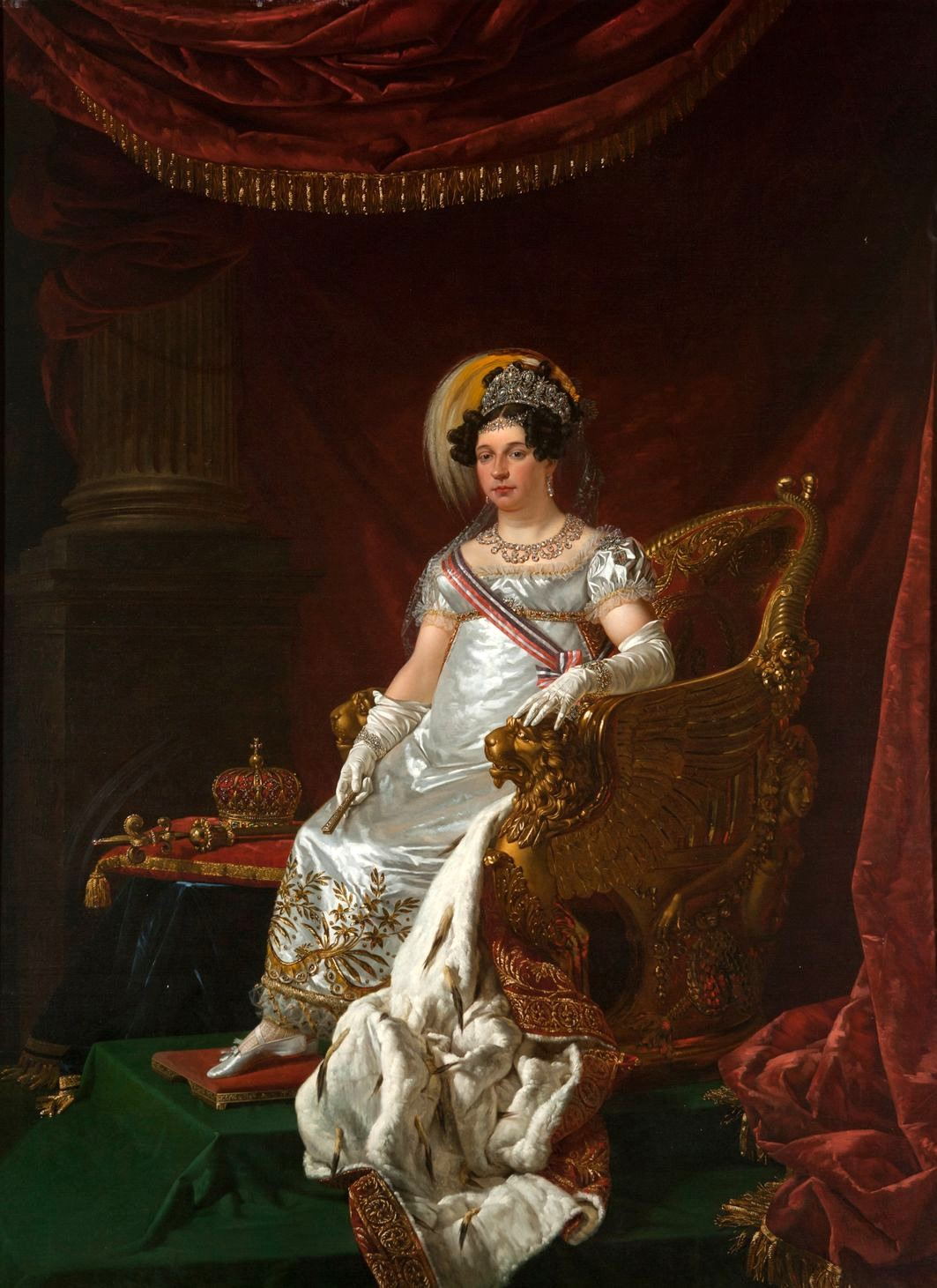
María Isabel, Queen of the Two Sicilies. Portrait by P.V. Hanselaere, Palace of Caserta

King Ferdinand I of the Two Sicilies died on 4 January 1825 and María Isabel's husband became the new king. Francis I, aged 47, was a large heavy man; well-intentioned; simple in his tastes and more interested in farming than in politics. Agriculture was his special past time. He had been better educated than his father, but was prematurely aged and weak in character and body. From the beginning, Francis I behaved very differently from the liberal prince he had been as heir to the crown and his short reign was essentially reactionary. Although jealous of his authority, he left the government in the hands of his prime minister Luigi de' Medici (1759 - 1830). The king's valet, Michelangelo Viglia, and Caterina de Simone, the Queen's lady-in-waiting, ruled the royal household in which corruption was rampant.

In her role as queen consort, María Isabel did not play an active part in governmental affairs, according to contemporary observers. At age thirty-four, she was the mother of twelve children and was still nursing her son, the Count of Aquila, born the previous year. Sources describe her as having gained significant weight after years of childbearing. Historians characterize María Isabel as fond of theater, balls, and public festivities, and note that she was regarded as warm-natured and generous. These qualities contributed to her popularity among the public, reportedly more so than her husband.

The royal couple lived surrounded by soldiers, always in dread of a revolution. Their security was guaranteed by the Austrian troops stationed in Naples, but their expenses were a heavy burden on the state coffers and the main reason for the high public debt. On Medici's advise, Francis and María Isabel, taking with them their one-year-old son the Count of Aquila, went to Milan in May 1825 in order to obtain a reduction in the occupation troops. After an agreement between Medici and the Austrian ambassador Count Karl Ludwig von Ficquelmont, the King and Queen returned to Naples on 18 July. The Austrian troops were reduced to 12,000 beginning at the end of that year and departed in February 1827.

The Queen's constant companion was her second daughter Maria Christina, who was as flirtatious as her mother. Maria Christina was already in her early twenties and her parents were eager to find a royal husband for her. The opportunity came when María Isabel's brother, Ferdinand VII of Spain, suddenly became a widower in May 1829. María Isabel's eldest daughter, now Infanta Luisa Carlota, quickly arranged the marriage between her sister and their uncle.

Ferdinand VII invited his sister and brother-in-law to accompany their daughter to the wedding in Madrid. Francis I's was afflicted with gout and on declining health, but María Isabel was anxious to visit her native country after 27 years of absence. She convinced her husband to make the long trip to Spain. Their eldest son, Ferdinand, Duke of Calabria was left as regent during their absence.

Traveling by land, the royal party left for Spain on 28 September 1829. On their way, they visited Pope Pius VIII in Rome. In Grenoble, they met the Duchess of Berry, happy to see her parents after thirteen years. Once in Spain, the marriage was celebrated on 25 January 1830. On the way back, they were reunited once again with the Duchess of Berry who presented to them to her infant son, the Duke of Bordeaux, at Chambord. María Isabel and her husband went to Paris, where they were entertained by King Charles X. In June, the King and Queen left for Genoa reaching Naples on 30 July. After their return, the king's health deteriorated rapidly. He died on 8 November 1830.

== Queen mother ==
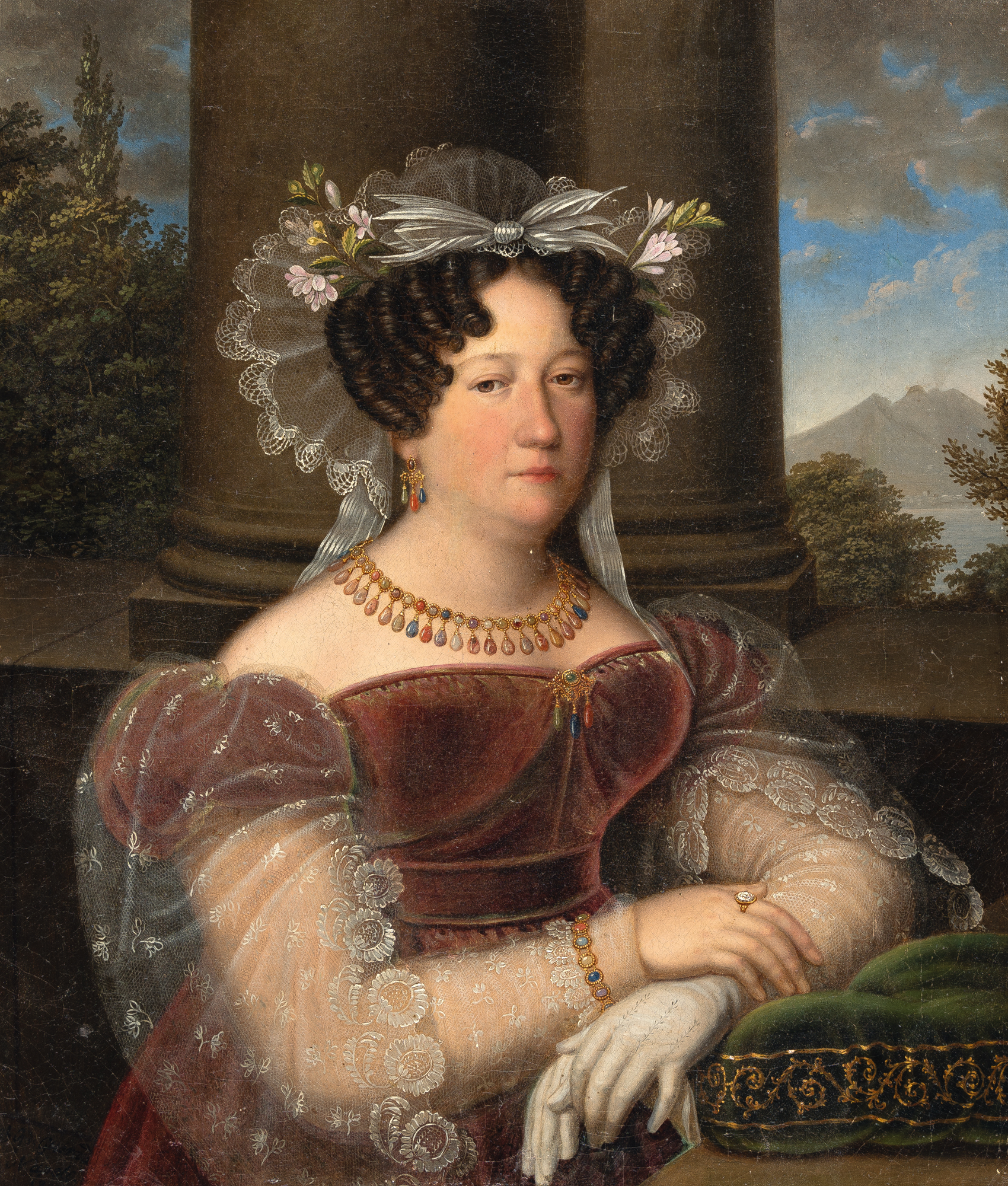
María Isabel in 1832

At the death of her husband, María Isabel's eldest son became King Ferdinand II. Unbeknownst to her, she was at the center of a liberal conspiracy hatched by Prince Vincenzo Ruffo della Scaletta and Peter Ugo, Marquis delle Favare. Their intention was to name María Isabel regent, displacing her conservative son from the throne for at least a couple of years. The plot was discovered and immediately crushed by the young king. Ferdinand II was only 20 years old. Shy and quiet, he was, however, more energetic than his father and grandfather had been and took his duties as king more seriously. The relationship between María Isabel and Ferdinand II was cold. The Queen mother had a marked preference for her second son, Charles, Prince of Capua, who was more outgoing and shared her frivolity.

In the early years of widowhood, María Isabel was still young, with a will to live and a certain beauty, despite her increasing obesity. Surrounded by admirers, she had a weakness for handsome officials younger than her. According to court rumors, she took lovers. Her behavior made her an easy target for libels and exasperated Ferdinand II. María Isabel was kind to her daughter-in-law Maria Cristina of Savoy, who married Ferdinand II on 21 November 1832. The new queen achieved a reconciliation between mother and son.

In 1835, María Isabel began an affair with Baron Peter von Schmuckher, a married Austrian officer. Their on and off relationship was turbulent. Nevertheless, at the death of Schmuckher's wife in 1837, she intended to marry him. When the ambitious baron claimed the style and privileges of Royal Highness as a condition for marrying her, María Isabel rejected him, appealing to her son to rid her of her former lover. The king had Schmuckher expelled from Naples in January 1838.

== Later years ==
In January 1836, María Isabel served as a godmother to her grandson Francesco, Duke of Calabria. In March that same year, the Prince of Capua contracted a morganatic marriage. María Isabel pleaded for her favorite son, but her efforts to obtain a pardon for him proved fruitless. Ferdinand II did not forgive his runaway brother: Capua went into permanent exile in England, and María Isabel never saw him again.

As María Isabel was determined to remarry, her son, King Ferdinand II, gave her a list with names of young noblemen of the kingdom, from whom to choose. Her first two choices hesitated and she withdrew her proposals. Ultimately she selected Francesco, Count dal Balzo dei Duchi di Presenzano (1805–1882), a handsome young lieutenant from an ancient but impoverished noble family. Their marriage took place privately on 15 January 1839. She was 50 years old and the groom, 34. The couple had no children. They retired from the Neapolitan court, moving to the Palace of Capodimonte.

Tragedy struck the Queen Dowager when in January 1843, Antonio, Count of Lecce, her fourth son was killed. Her fifth son, Luigi, Count of Aquila, followed a career in the navy. In July 1843 he went to Brazil when Teresa, María Isabel's youngest daughter, married Emperor Pedro II of Brazil. In 1845, to keep the Spanish throne in the House of Bourbon Louis Philippe d'Orléans, King of the French, launched the idea of marrying María Isabel's youngest son Francesco, Count of Trapani, who had been originally destined for the church, to Queen Isabella II of Spain, her granddaughter, in another union between uncle and niece. The project did not, however, come to fruition.

In the political crisis of late 1847, María Isabel, her son Leopold, Count of Syracuse and her brother-in-law, Leopold, Prince of Salerno, advocated in vain in favor of liberal reforms. Due to her affable character and generosity towards the poor, María Isabel remained a popular figure till the end. She died on 13 September 1848 at age 59.

== Issue ==

Francis and María Isabel were well matched and he treated her with kindness. They had twelve children, six daughters and six sons:

- Princess Luisa Carlotta (1804–1844), married her mother's younger brother Infante Francisco de Paula of Spain.
- Princess Maria Cristina (1806–1878), married firstly her mother's older brother Ferdinand VII of Spain and became queen regent of Spain; and secondly, Agustín Fernando Muñoz Sánchez, subsequently created Duke of Riánsares.
- Ferdinand II of the Two Sicilies (1810–1859), became Francis I's successor and married twice.
- Carlo Ferdinando, Prince of Capua (1811–1862), married non-dynastically to Penelope Smyth; and had issue.
- Prince Leopoldo, Count of Syracuse (1813–1860), married Princess Maria of Savoy-Carignan; had issue.
- Princess Maria Antonia (1814–1898), married Leopold II, Grand Duke of Tuscany.
- Prince Antonio, Count of Lecce (1816–1843).
- Princess Maria Amalia (1818–1857), married Infante Sebastian of Portugal and Spain.
- Princess Maria Carolina (1820–1861), married Infante Carlos, Count of Montemolín, the Carlist pretender to the throne of Spain; had no issue.
- Princess Teresa Cristina (1822–1889), married Emperor Pedro II of Brazil; had issue.
- Prince Luigi, Count of Aquila (1824–1897), married Princess Januária of Brazil (sister of Pedro II of Brazil and of Maria II of Portugal); had issue.
- Prince Francesco, Count of Trapani (1827–1892), married Archduchess Maria Isabella of Austria; and had issue.

== Ancestors ==
Ancestors of María Isabel of Spain

8. Philip V of Spain
4. Charles III of Spain
9. Elisabeth Farnese
2. Charles IV of Spain
10. Augustus III of Poland
5. Maria Amalia of Saxony
11. Maria Josepha of Austria
1. María Isabel of Spain
12. Philip V of Spain (= 8)
6. Philip, Duke of Parma
13. Elisabeth Farnese (= 9)
3. Maria Luisa of Parma
14. Louis XV of France
7. Louise-Élisabeth of France
15. Marie Leszczyńska

== Notes ==
María Isabel of Spain House of Bourbon Born: 6 July 1789 Died: 13 September 1848
Italian royalty
Vacant Title last held by Caroline Bonaparte as Queen of Naples	Queen consort of the Two Sicilies; 4 January 1825 – 8 November 1830	Vacant Title next held by Maria Cristina of Savoy
Vacant Title last held by Maria Carolina of Austria as Queen of Sicily	Queen consort of the Two Sicilies; 4 January 1825 – 8 November 1830	Vacant Title next held by Maria Cristina of Savoy
