= August 1904 =

Month of 1904

<<	August 1904					>>
Su	Mo	Tu	We	Th	Fr	Sa
	1	2	3	4	5	6
7	8	9	10	11	12	13
14	15	16	17	18	19	20
21	22	23	24	25	26	27
28	29	30	31

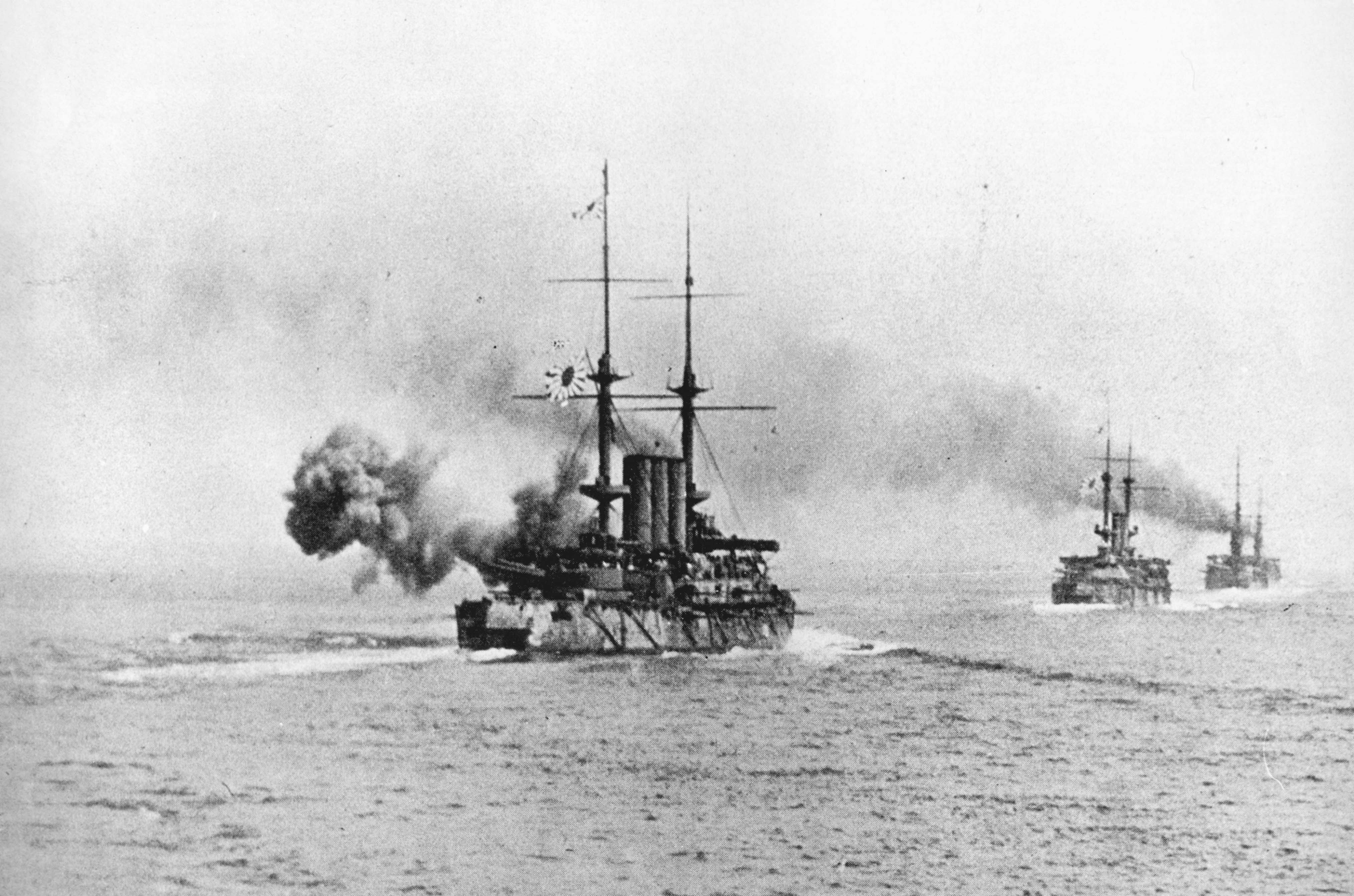
August 10, 1904: Japanese battleship Shikishima firing during the Battle of the Yellow Sea

The following events occurred in August 1904:

== August 1, 1904 (Monday) ==
- The siege of Port Arthur, the longest and most violent land battle of the Russo-Japanese War, began.
- John Carr, a contractor, carried out a mass shooting at a hotel in Nebraska City, Nebraska, killing one man and wounding eight others, including two police officers.
- Died: Robert E. Pattison, 53, American politician, former Governor of Pennsylvania, died of pneumonia.

== August 2, 1904 (Tuesday) ==
- Died: Jacob H. Studer, 64, American ornithologist, died of heart failure.

== August 3, 1904 (Wednesday) ==
- The British expedition to Tibet under Colonel Francis Younghusband took Lhasa.
- The dirigible California Arrow, created and flown by Thomas Scott Baldwin and powered by a motorcycle engine built by Glenn Curtiss, became the first aircraft to complete a circuit in the United States. Baldwin took off from Idora Park, Oakland, California, and circled over San Francisco Bay before returning to his starting point.
- Born: Dolores del Río (born Lolita Dolores Martinez Asúnsolo López Negrette), Mexican actress; in Durango, Mexico (d. 1983, liver failure due to hepatitis)
- Died:
  - Ernst Jedliczka, 49, Russian-born German pianist
  - William O'Connor Morris, 79, Irish county court judge and historian
  - Pierre-Nicolas "Peter" Remillard, 67, Quebec-born brick manufacturer, died of a heart attack.

== August 4, 1904 (Thursday) ==
- The Liberal Revolution of 1904 began in Paraguay, with Manuel J. Duarte and General Benigno Ferreira leading a rebellion against President Juan Antonio Escurra's government.
- Born:
  - Helen Kane, American singer, dancer, comedian and actress; in The Bronx, New York City (d. 1966, breast cancer)
  - Bill Coleman, American jazz trumpeter; in Paris, Kentucky (d. 1981)
  - Witold Gombrowicz, Polish novelist and dramatist; in Małoszyce, Congress Poland, Russian Empire (d. 1969)
  - Victor Bateman, Australian rules footballer (Sturt Football Club); in Parkside, South Australia (d. 1972)
  - Lawrence Betts, South African Olympic sprinter; in Pretoria, Transvaal Colony (d. 1984)
  - Jack Cobb (born John Blackwell Cobb), American college basketball player (North Carolina Tar Heels); in Durham, North Carolina (d. 1966)
  - Norm Davis, Australian rules footballer (North Melbourne Football Club); in Port Melbourne, Victoria (d. 1966)
  - Sprouts Elder (born James Lloyd Elder), American motorcycle speedway rider; in Fresno, California (d. 1957, suicide)
  - Marthe Flandrin, French artist and painter; in Montgeron (d. 1987)
  - Max Fourny, French publisher, art collector and racing driver, husband of Françoise Adnet; in Amiens (d. 1991)
  - Wallace Samuel Gourley, United States district judge; in Wellsville, Ohio (d. 1976)
  - Ukko Hietala, Finnish Olympic modern pentathlete; in Hollola (d. 1990)
  - Bassett Maguire, American botanist and explorer, head curator of the New York Botanical Garden; in Alabama City, Alabama (d. 1991, kidney failure)
  - Sushila Ganesh Mavalankar, Indian freedom fighter and politician; in the Bombay Presidency (d. 1995)
  - Theodore Newton, American film and stage actor; in Lawrenceville, New Jersey (d. 1963)
  - Thomas Parry, Welsh writer and academic, Librarian of the National Library of Wales; in Carmel, Gwynedd (d. 1985)
  - Ludwig Reiber, German art director; in Munich (d. 1979)
  - Joe Tate, English footballer who gained three caps for the England national football team; in Old Hill, Cradley Heath (d. 1973)
  - Otto Tschumi, Swiss surrealist painter (d. 1985)
- Died:
  - James T. Lewis, 84, former Governor of Wisconsin, died of apoplexy.
  - Jo Hamilton, 77, American lawyer and politician, former Attorney General of California
  - Robert Crannell Minor, 65, American artist

== August 5, 1904 (Friday) ==
- In Red Oak, Iowa, 32-year-old Harry Heaton Salisbury was robbed and murdered by being administered knockout drops and pushed off a footbridge over Red Oak Creek. The murder was never solved.
- Born:
  - Hugh Greer, American basketball coach (UConn Huskies men's basketball); in Suffield, Connecticut (d. 1963, heart attack)
  - Kenneth V. Thimann, English-American plant physiologist and microbiologist; in Ashford, Kent (d. 1997)
- Died: Sir George Dibbs KCMG, 69, Australian politician, former Premier of New South Wales, died of heart disease.

== August 6, 1904 (Saturday) ==
- Edmund (or Edmond) Bell, an African American man, was lynched 8 miles (13 km) from Selma, Alabama, by a 300-person masked African American mob for the August 2 murder of Houston Cruggs (or Scruggs), who was also African American.
- Born: Ballard Berkeley (born Ballard Blascheck), British actor; in Kent, England (d. 1988)
- Died:
  - Eduard Hanslick, 78, Austrian music critic
  - James Cox Aikins, PC, 81, Canadian politician

== August 7, 1904 (Sunday) ==
- On the Denver and Rio Grande Railroad near Pueblo, Colorado, a flash flood caused the Eden train wreck, which left over 100 people dead or missing.
- Rafael Reyes assumed office as President of Colombia, succeeding José Manuel Marroquín.
- Born: Ralph Bunche, American diplomat, recipient of the Nobel Peace Prize; in Detroit, Michigan (d. 1971, complications of heart disease, kidney disease and diabetes)
- Died: Yamaguchi Motomi, 58, Imperial Japanese Army general and samurai, died of natural causes.

== August 8, 1904 (Monday) ==
- A conflagration in the old quarter of Strasbourg (then in the German Empire) destroyed an orphan asylum and the Sainte-Madeleine Church and caused $1,500,000 in damage. The church would be rebuilt in 1907, destroyed again in 1944 during World War II, and once again rebuilt in 1958.
- Paraguayan President Juan Antonio Escurra declared a state of siege as a result of the Liberal rebellion.
- Born: Achille Varzi, Italian racing driver, winner of the 1933 Monaco Grand Prix; in Galliate, Piedmont (d. 1948, racing practice crash)
- Died:
  - Mamie Gilroy, c. 33, American actress, died of heart disease.
  - John Innes JP, 75, British philanthropist

== August 9, 1904 (Tuesday) ==
- An earthquake with a magnitude estimated at 6.8 M_{s} and 7.0–7.2 M_{w} struck 10 kilometres (6.2 mi) north of Cape Turnagain, New Zealand. The quake, the largest in New Zealand since 1888, caused one death and extensive damage.
- Eight Moro and Igorrote leaders, who were participating in the Philippine exhibit at the Louisiana Purchase Exposition, visited U.S. President Theodore Roosevelt at the White House.
- Died:
  - George Graham Vest, 73, American politician, former member of the Confederate States Congress and the United States Senate from Missouri
  - Sir William Mitchell Banks FRCS, 61, Scottish surgeon
  - Joseph David Everett, 72, English physicist, died of heart failure.
  - Friedrich Ratzel, 59, German geographer and ethnographer
  - John F. Starr, 86, American businessman and politician, former member of the United States House of Representatives from New Jersey

== August 10, 1904 (Wednesday) ==
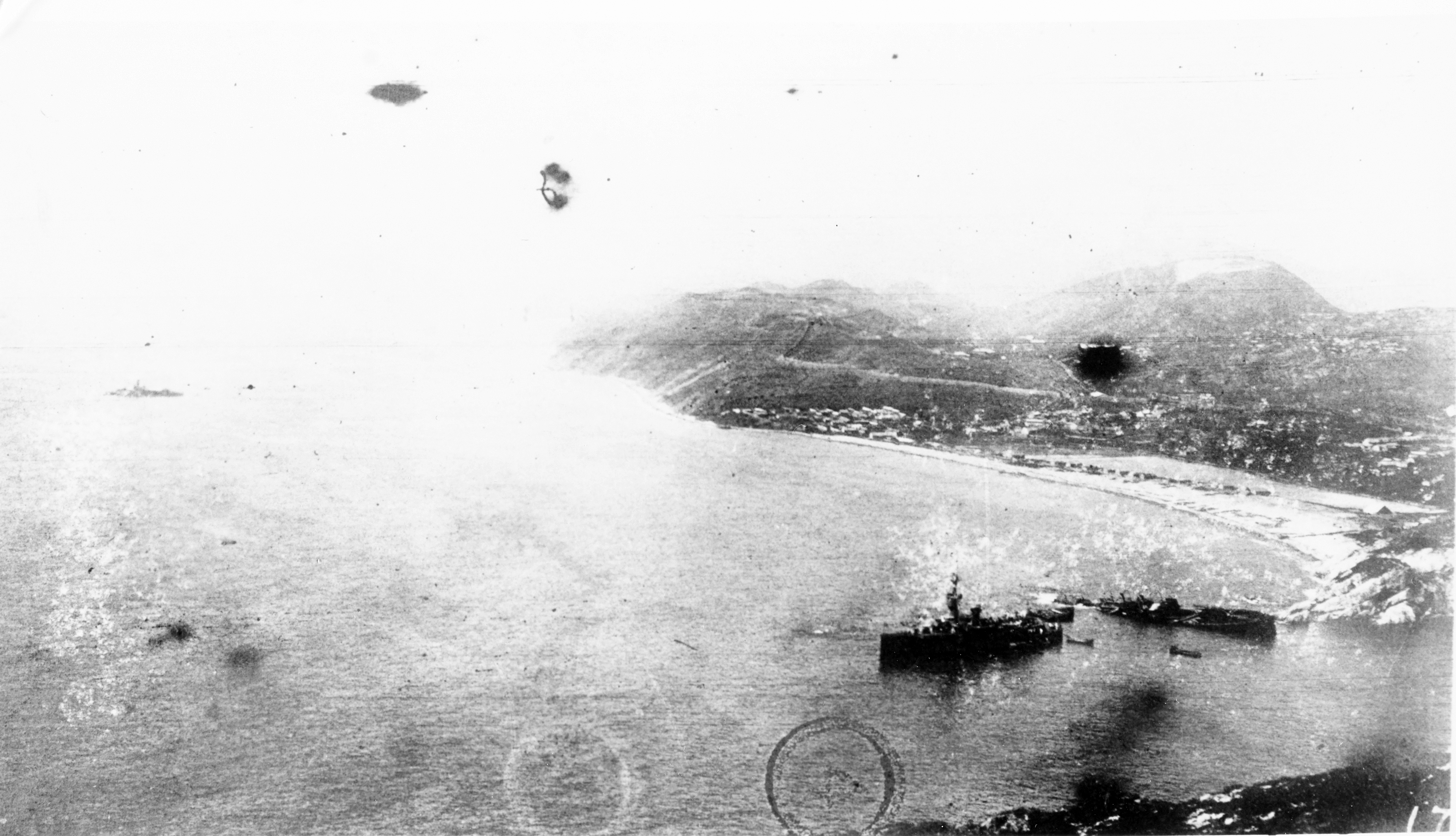
Battle of the Yellow Sea

- The Battle of the Yellow Sea resulted in a strategic Japanese victory.
- Born: Gerald Dupuis, Canadian Olympic ski jumper; in Montreal (d. 1960)
- Died:
  - Pierre Waldeck-Rousseau, 57, French politician, 29th Prime Minister of France, died after surgery.
  - Wilgelm Vitgeft, 56, Russian admiral, was killed in action at the Battle of the Yellow Sea.

== August 11, 1904 (Thursday) ==
- Lothar von Trotha defeated the Herero people at the Battle of Waterberg in German South West Africa and drove them into the Omaheke desert, beginning the Herero and Namaqua genocide.
- A 6.2 magnitude earthquake struck Samos in the Ottoman Empire, with an aftershock occurring three days later. Four people were killed.
- On the Paraguay River near Pilar, Paraguay, the rebel vessel Sojonia defeated the government vessel Villa Rica in battle. 28 government sailors were killed.
- Eight miners drowned when the Berringer gold mine near Gold Hill, North Carolina, filled with water due to a dam giving way.
- Born: Bernard Castro, Italian inventor; near Palermo, Sicily (d. 1991)
- Died: Samuel Putnam Avery, 82, American art dealer and connoisseur

== August 12, 1904 (Friday) ==
- Born: Alexei Nikolaevich, Tsarevich of Russia; at Peterhof Palace, Saint Petersburg Governorate, Russian Empire (murdered in 1918)
- Died:
  - George H. Brickner, 70, German-born American politician, former member of the U.S. House of Representatives from Wisconsin
  - Kawamura Sumiyoshi, 67, Japanese admiral
  - William Renshaw, 43, British tennis player, winner of 12 Major titles, died of epileptic convulsions.

== August 13, 1904 (Saturday) ==
- Ten spectators at the annual regatta on the Potomac River at Georgetown drowned when the gasoline launch Recreation capsized. Four people were rescued.
- Born:
  - Jonathan Hole, American actor; in Eldora, Iowa (d. 1998)
  - Charles "Buddy" Rogers, American actor and jazz musician; in Olathe, Kansas (d. 1999)
- Died:
  - Elizabeth Wellesley, Duchess of Wellington, 83
  - Sir Robert Samuel Wright, 65, Justice of the British High Court, Queen's Bench Division

== August 14, 1904 (Sunday) ==
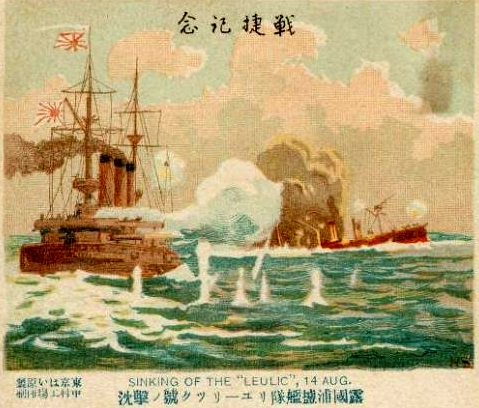
Sinking of the Russian cruiser Rurik in the Battle off Ulsan

- The naval Battle off Ulsan, Korea, resulted in a Japanese victory.
- Ismael Montes became President of Bolivia.
- On August 14 and 15, 8 Paraguayan government soldiers died fighting rebels near Asunción.
- Died:
  - Eduard von Martens, 73, German zoologist
  - William Wainwright, 67–68, American real estate developer, died of gastritis.

== August 15, 1904 (Monday) ==
- Died: John Henry Kinkead, 77, American businessman and politician, 1st Governor of Alaska and 3rd Governor of Nevada

== August 16, 1904 (Tuesday) ==
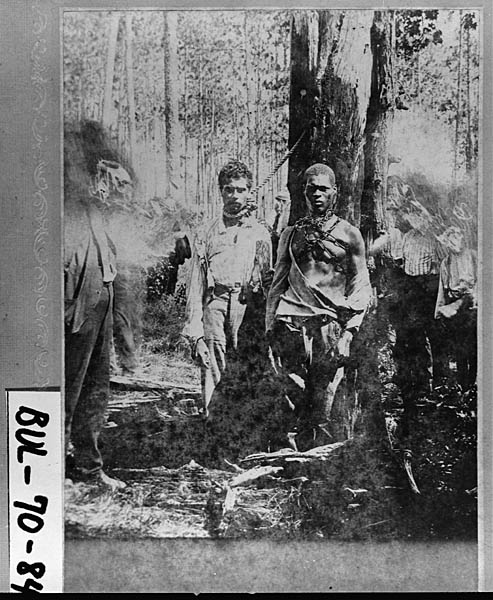
Reed and Cato chained to a tree stump prior to their deaths

- In Statesboro, Georgia, a lynch mob invaded a courthouse where two African-American men, Paul Reed and Will Cato, had just been convicted and sentenced to death for the murders of five members of a white family. The lynchers chained Reed and Cato to a tree stump and burned them to death.
- Emperor Franz Joseph I of Austria and Edward VII of the United Kingdom paid mutual visits at Marienbad, Bohemia.
- Born:
  - Wendell Meredith Stanley, American chemist, Nobel Prize laureate; in Ridgeville, Indiana (d. 1971)
  - Minoru Genda, Japanese aviator, naval officer and politician; in Hiroshima (d. 1989)
  - Jin Weiying, Chinese communist revolutionary, trade unionist and participant in the Long March (d. 1940/41)
- Died:
  - Prentiss Ingraham, 60, Confederate Army colonel and author of dime fiction, died of Bright's disease.
  - George E. Lounsbury, 66, American politician, 58th Governor of Connecticut
  - Karl Käser, 30, German track cyclist, was killed in a race crash.

== August 17, 1904 (Wednesday) ==
- A Japanese infantry charge failed to take Port Arthur.
- Three rebel vessels bombarded Asunción, Paraguay, for 40 minutes.
- In Chicago, a collision between a train of three trolley cars and a Chicago Great Western Railroad express train killed 4 people and injured 24.
- A heavy rainstorm caused flooding that killed at least 8 people in Globe, Arizona.
- Born:
  - Mary Cain, American newspaper editor and politician; in Burke, Iberia Parish, Louisiana (d. 1984)
  - Leopold Nowak, Austrian musicologist; in Vienna (d. 1991)
  - John Hay Whitney, American newspaper tycoon, diplomat, and philanthropist, U.S. Ambassador to the United Kingdom (1957-1861) (d. 1982)
- Died:
  - Louis Molleur, 76, Quebec educator, businessman and politician
  - Edwin M. Shepard, 60, United States Navy rear admiral, died of heart disease.
  - Henry Martyn Whitney, 80, early journalist and newspaper publisher in the Kingdom of Hawaii, died of heart disease.

== August 18, 1904 (Thursday) ==
- Chris Watson resigned as the first Labor Prime Minister of Australia and was succeeded by George Reid of the Free Trade Party.
- In Chicago, 16-year-old James Pine died of injuries sustained when he was thrown on his head during a neighborhood American football game.
- Died: Sivert Andreas Nielsen, 80, Norwegian politician, former President of the Storting

== August 19, 1904 (Friday) ==
- A tornado swept through North St. Louis, killing one person, injuring over 150 and causing $100,000 in damage. The tornado then moved on to Venice and Granite City, Illinois, where it killed two more people and injured 10.
- Born: George de la Warr, British civil engineer and alternative physician; in Southwick, Sussex (d. 1969)

== August 20, 1904 (Saturday) ==
- The naval Battle of Korsakov resulted in a Japanese victory. The Japanese cruiser Tsushima prevented the Russian cruiser Novik from escaping from the town of Korsakov at the southern end of Sakhalin Island, and Novik's commanding officer ordered her scuttled.

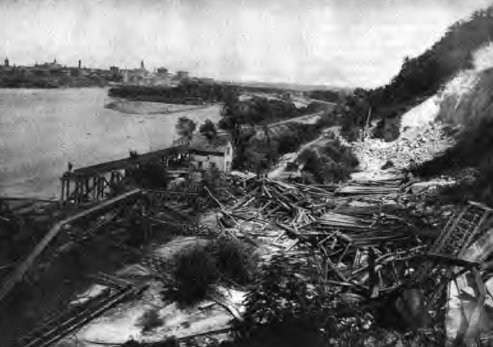
Wreckage of the High Bridge in Saint Paul

- In Saint Paul and Minneapolis, Minnesota, tornadoes with sustained winds of 110 miles per hour (180 km/h) and gusts of 180 miles per hour (290 km/h) killed 3 people in downtown Saint Paul and caused $2 million in damage, including the partial destruction of the High Bridge across the Mississippi River.

== August 21, 1904 (Sunday) ==
- Born:
  - Count Basie (born William James Basie), American musician and bandleader; in Red Bank, New Jersey (d. 1984, pancreatic cancer)
  - Sergey Biryuzov, Marshal of the Soviet Union and Chief of the General Staff; in Skopin, Russian Empire (d. 1964, plane crash)
- Died: Gaudensi Allar, 63, French architect

== August 22, 1904 (Monday) ==
- "Jim" Glover, an African American man, was lynched in Cedartown, Georgia, for an attack on a 13-year-old white girl.
- Fire destroyed the town of Laytonville, California.
- Born:
  - Deng Xiaoping, Chinese communist leader; in Sichuan, Qing China (d. 1997)
  - Jay Novello (born Michael Romano), American actor; in Chicago, Illinois (d. 1982, lung cancer)
- Died:
  - Kate Chopin (born Katherine O'Flaherty), 54, American author
  - Albert Constable, 65, American politician, former member of the Maryland House of Delegates, died four days after being shot during a highway robbery.

== August 23, 1904 (Tuesday) ==
- During exercises off Newport, Rhode Island, the U.S. Navy submarine Porpoise suddenly plunged to the ocean floor at a depth of 120 feet (37 m). The sub's 8-man crew worked desperately for 20 minutes to bring her back up. When their efforts seemed to have failed, the sub unexpectedly resurfaced.
- Born:
  - Thelma Furness, Viscountess Furness (born Thelma Morgan), American socialite twin; in Lucerne, Switzerland (d. 1970, heart attack)
  - Gloria Morgan Vanderbilt (born Maria Mercedes Morgan), American socialite twin; in Lucerne, Switzerland (d. 1965, cancer)
  - William Primrose, Scottish violist; in Glasgow (d. 1982, cancer)
- Died: George Leander, 21, American track cyclist, co-winner of the Six Days of New York in 1902 and American stayer champion in 1903, died in Paris of injuries sustained in a race crash.

== August 24, 1904 (Wednesday) ==
- Alexei Nikolaevich, Tsarevich of Russia, was christened at Peterhof Palace in Saint Petersburg, 12 days after his birth.
- The Faroese Association football club Klaksvíkar Ítróttarfelag was established.
- Born:
  - Ida Cook, English campaigner for Jewish refugees, and romantic novelist using the pen name Mary Burchell; in Sunderland (d. 1986, cancer)
  - Aparicio Méndez, 50th President of Uruguay; in Rivera (d. 1988)
  - Judikje "Jud" Simons, Dutch Olympic champion artistic gymnast; in The Hague (d. 1943, murdered in Sobibor extermination camp)

== August 25, 1904 (Thursday) ==
- Died:
  - Henri Fantin-Latour, 68, French painter
  - William Weightman, 90, American chemical manufacturer and landowner

== August 26, 1904 (Friday) ==
- American boxer James J. Jeffries retained the world heavyweight championship by knocking out challenger Jack Munroe in the second round of a bout at Mechanic's Pavilion in San Francisco, California.

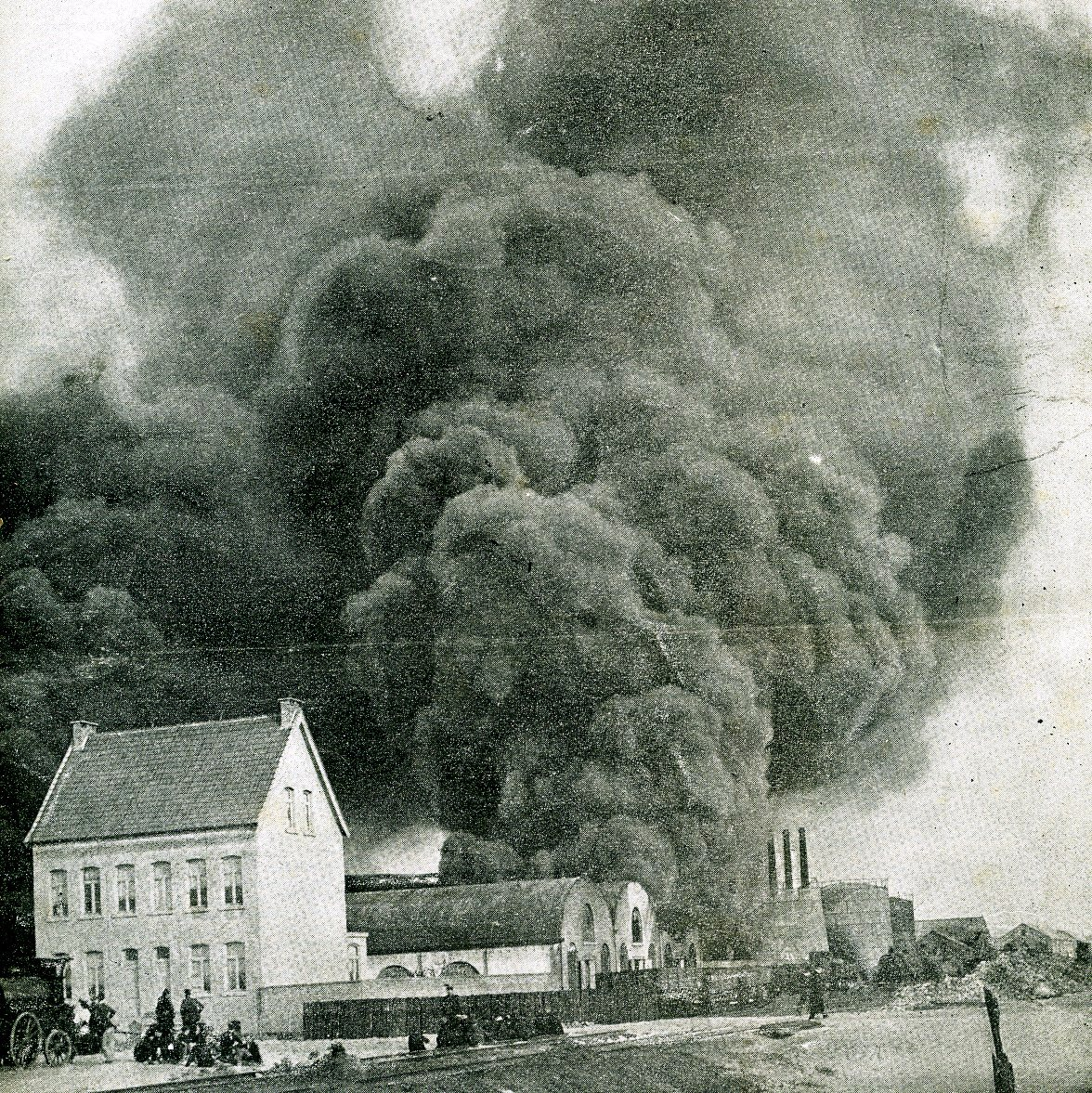
Fire in Antwerp

- A major fire began in Hoboken, Antwerp, which killed 7 workmen, destroyed 40 oil tanks containing 26,500,000 US gallons (100,000,000 L; 22,100,000 imp gal) of petroleum and caused an estimated $1,250,000 in damage.
- Born:
  - Christopher Isherwood, English writer; in High Lane, Cheshire (d. 1986, prostate cancer)
  - Rouville Beaudry, Canadian politician, member of the Legislative Assembly of Quebec; in Magog, Quebec (d. 1997)
  - Augustine Courtauld (aka August Courtauld), British explorer, meteorologist and yachtsman; in Bocking, Essex (d. 1959, complications of multiple sclerosis)
  - Sonny Lee (born Thomas Ball Lee), American jazz trombonist; in Huntsville, Texas (d. 1975)
  - Romain-Octave Pelletier II, Canadian music critic, music producer and violinist; in Saint-Lambert, Montérégie, Quebec (d. 1968)
  - Bogdan Raditsa, Croatian-American historian, author and diplomat; in Split, Austro-Hungarian Empire (d. 1993)
  - John M. Schiff, American investment banker and philanthropist; in Roslyn, New York (d. 1987)
  - Michel Vieuchange, French adventurer and explorer, first European to visit the ruins of Smara; in Nevers (d. 1930, dysentery)
  - Tomo Vladimirski, Macedonian painter; in Skopje (d. 1971)
  - Joe Hulme, English footballer, cricketer and journalist; in Stafford (d. 1991)
  - Franz Horn, German international footballer and businessman; in Essen (d. 1963)
  - Georgia Schmidt, American actress; in Marion, Indiana (d. 1997)
  - Aleksander Szenajch, Polish Olympic sprinter; in Warsaw, Russian Empire (d. 1987)
- Died: Charles Woodruff Shields, 75, American theologian and Princeton University professor, died of heart disease.

== August 27, 1904 (Saturday) ==
- The Connecticut-class battleship USS Louisiana (BB-19) was launched at Newport News, Virginia.
- Near Portal, Georgia, five men abducted Sebastian McBride, an African American man, from his house, brought him to the woods and whipped and shot him. Before dying from his injuries, McBride identified three of his assailants, all of them white men, to the sheriff.
- Died: Samuel Hole, 84, English Anglican priest, author and horticulturist

== August 28, 1904 (Sunday) ==
- During an auto race at the Louisiana Purchase Exposition in St. Louis, American racing driver Barney Oldfield's car crashed through a fence, killing two spectators and injuring Oldfield.
- In a shootout on the main street of Silver City, New Mexico, Constable Perfecto Rodriguez was shot and killed and three other men, including City Marshal William Kilburn, were seriously wounded. Kilburn died of his wounds the following day.
- Born: Secondo Campini, Italian jet pioneer; in Bologna, Emilia-Romagna (d. 1980)

== August 29, 1904 (Monday) ==
- In Laramie, Wyoming, a mob lynched Joseph Martin, an African American man who worked as a "trusty" in the county jail, for an alleged attack on a white girl.
- Born: Werner Forssmann, German physician, recipient of the Nobel Prize in Physiology or Medicine; in Berlin, Germany (d. 1979, heart failure)
- Died: Murad V, 63, former Ottoman Sultan, died of diabetes.

== August 30, 1904 (Tuesday) ==
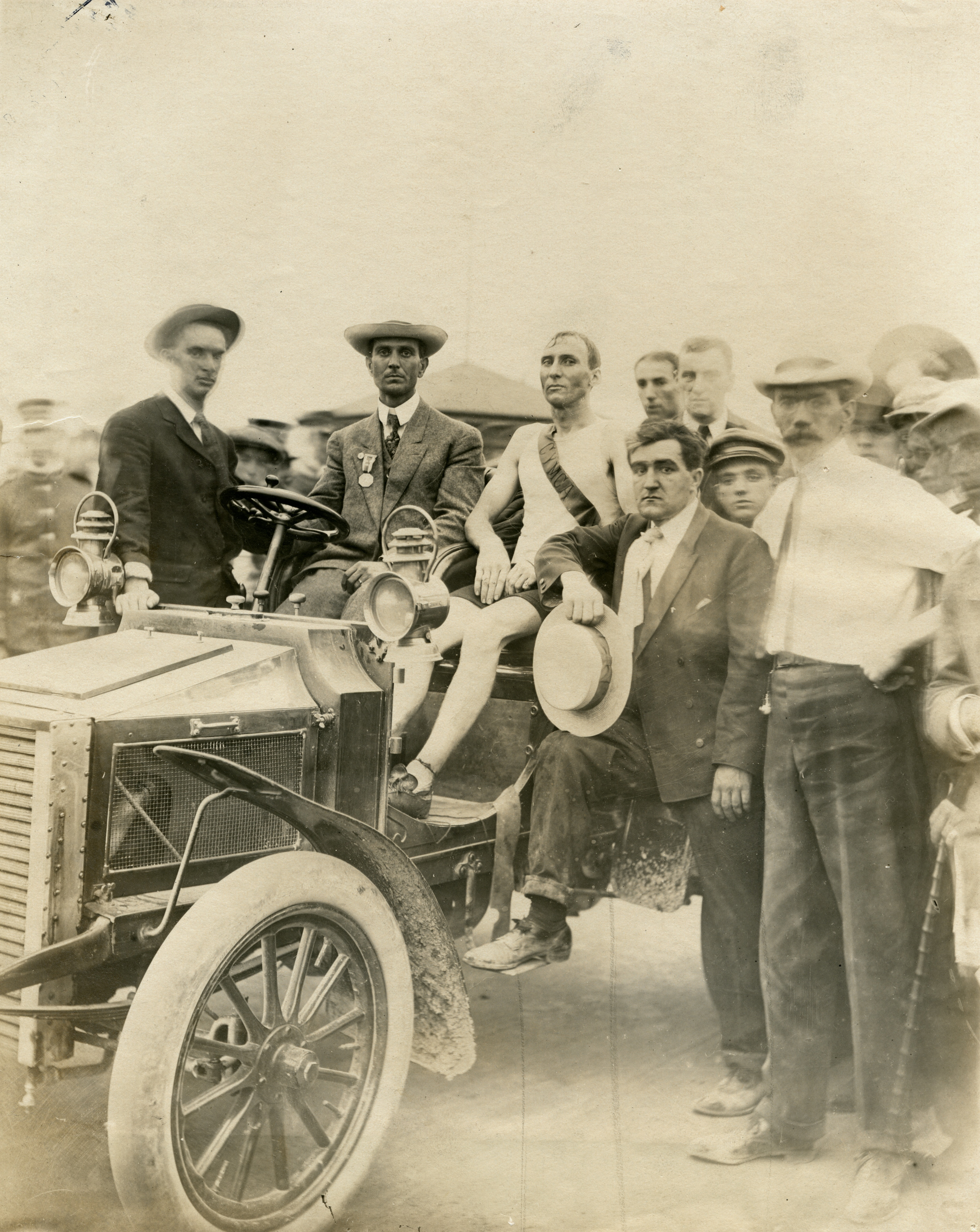
Marathon winner Thomas Hicks resting after the race

- The 1904 Olympic marathon, one of the strangest events in the history of the modern Olympic Games, took place in St. Louis, Missouri. The race was held in 90 °F (32 °C) temperatures, with only two water sources available, 6 miles (9.7 km) and 12 miles (19 km) along the 40-kilometre (25 mi) course, due to Olympic organizer James Edward Sullivan's desire to conduct research on "purposeful dehydration". The first man to cross the finish line, American runner Frederick Lorz (who would win the Boston Marathon the following year), was disqualified due to having ridden most of the distance in a car after dropping out 9 miles (14 km) into the race. The actual winner, English-born American runner Thomas Hicks, was administered strychnine and brandy during the race by his support team, who ultimately carried him across the finish line while he shuffled his feet in the air. Hicks' winning time of 3:28:53 remains the slowest in Olympic marathon history. Cuban runner Andarín Carvajal finished fourth despite taking a nap in the middle of the race after eating rotten apples. The ninth and twelfth place finishers, Len Taunyane and Jan Mashiani, were the first South Africans to compete in the Olympics. American runner William Garcia collapsed on the course and nearly died from hemorrhaging due to inhaling dust kicked up by race officials' cars.
- Born: Charles E. Bohlen, American diplomat, United States Ambassador to the Soviet Union (1953–1957), the Philippines (1957–1959) and France (1962–1968); in Clayton, New York (d. 1974, cancer)
- Died:
  - Michael A. Healy, 64, United States Revenue Cutter Service captain, died of a heart attack. Healy was the first man of African American descent to command a U.S. government ship, but self-identified as white in his lifetime.
  - George Ridding, 76, English headmaster and bishop, first Bishop of Southwell

== August 31, 1904 (Wednesday) ==
- Geza Mattachich, the former lover of Princess Louise of Belgium, rescued her from a hotel in Bad Elster, Germany, where she was undergoing a thermal cure as part of her 6-year internment due to alleged mental illness.
