= October 1904 =

Month of 1904

<<	October 1904					>>
Su	Mo	Tu	We	Th	Fr	Sa
						1
2	3	4	5	6	7	8
9	10	11	12	13	14	15
16	17	18	19	20	21	22
23	24	25	26	27	28	29
30	31

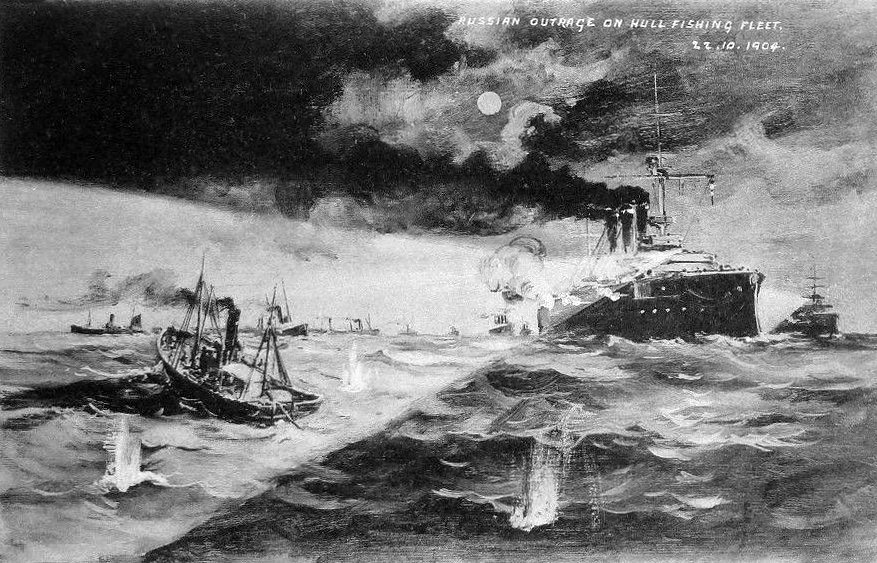
Dogger Bank incident, 21/22 October 1904: British postcard depicting the Russian warships firing on the fishing vessels

The following events occurred in October 1904:

== October 1, 1904 (Saturday) ==
- Died:
  - Henry Elijah Alvord, 60, American university administrator, educator, and Army officer
  - Sir William Harcourt KC, 76, British politician

== October 2, 1904 (Sunday) ==
- Born:
  - Graham Greene, English novelist; in Berkhamsted, Hertfordshire, England (d. 1991)
  - Lal Bahadur Shastri, 2nd Prime Minister of India; in Mughalsarai, United Provinces of Agra and Oudh, British India (d. 1966)
- Died: Clarence Madison Dally, 39, American glassblower, electrical engineer and assistant to Thomas Edison in his work on X-rays, died from mediastinal cancer due to X-ray exposure.

== October 3, 1904 (Monday) ==
- Born: Charles J. Pedersen, American chemist, Nobel Prize laureate; in Pusan, Korea (d. 1989)

== October 4, 1904 (Tuesday) ==
- Swedish association football club IFK Göteborg was founded, becoming the 39th IFK-association.
- Died:
  - Frédéric Bartholdi, 70, French sculptor of the Statue of Liberty, died of tuberculosis.
  - Carl Josef Bayer, 57, Austrian chemist
  - Edmund Francis Dunne (born Edmund Francis O'Dunne), 69, American politician, jurist and Catholic orator
  - Violet Nicolson (aka Laurence Hope), 39, British poet, committed suicide by poison.
  - Henry Clay Payne, 60, United States Postmaster General, died from disease of the mitral valve and dilation of the heart.
  - Pedro Sainsevain, 85, French settler of California

== October 5, 1904 (Wednesday) ==
- Alpha Kappa Psi, a co-ed professional business fraternity, was founded on the campus of New York University.
- In the 1904 Georgia gubernatorial election, incumbent Governor Joseph M. Terrell ran unopposed and won re-election.
- Died:
  - Peter Sells, 59, American circus proprietor, co-founder of Sells Brothers Circus, died of apoplexy.
  - Samuel F. Upham, 70, American professor and Chair of Practical Theology at Drew Theological Seminary

== October 6, 1904 (Thursday) ==
- Died: Ira Davenport, 63, American businessman, philanthropist and politician

== October 7, 1904 (Friday) ==
- The explosion of three shells killed 11 soldiers, injured others and destroyed the magazine at Fort Sainte Marie in Belgium.
- Politician and journalist Harry Marks won the 1904 Isle of Thanet by-election for the Parliament of the United Kingdom.

== October 8, 1904 (Saturday) ==
- USS Intrepid, a steel-hulled bark of the United States Navy, was launched at Mare Island Navy Yard.
- Died:
  - Matt W. Ransom, 78, Confederate States Army general and former United States Senator from North Carolina, died of heart disease.
  - Gustav Ratzenhofer, 62, Austrian philosopher

== October 9, 1904 (Sunday) ==
- German journalist Anna Rüling, in a speech to the Scientific-Humanitarian Committee in Berlin, made the first known public statement of the socio-legal problems faced by lesbians.

== October 11, 1904 (Tuesday) ==
- Loftus Road football stadium opened in London.
- Born: Tita Merello, Argentine actress, singer and tango dancer; in Buenos Aires (d. 2002)
- Died:
  - Mary Tenney Gray, 71, American club-woman
  - Archie Hooper, 23, Canadian ice hockey player, died from a hockey-related injury.

== October 13, 1904 (Thursday) ==
- Phi Delta Epsilon, the international medical fraternity, was founded at Cornell University Medical College.
- Died: Pavlos Melas, 34, Greek revolutionary and army officer, was encircled at Statista and killed during the Macedonian Struggle.

== October 15, 1904 (Saturday) ==
- Theta Tau, a professional engineering fraternity, was founded at the University of Minnesota in Minneapolis.
- Died: George, King of Saxony, 72

== October 16, 1904 (Sunday) ==
- The Italian barkentine Georges Valentine ran aground in shallow water off the Atlantic coast of Florida and wrecked off Hutchinson Island near Gilbert's Bar. Seven crew members survived; five perished. Their bodies were not recovered.
- Born: Princess Isabel Alfonsa of Bourbon-Two Sicilies, daughter of Prince Carlos of Bourbon-Two Sicilies and Mercedes, Princess of Asturias and granddaughter of Alfonso XII; in Madrid. Isabel Alfonsa's mother would die the following day from complications of childbirth.

== October 17, 1904 (Monday) ==
- Died:
  - Mercedes, Princess of Asturias, 24, died from complications of childbirth.
  - Ștefan Petică, 27, Romanian poet and writer, died of tuberculosis.

== October 18, 1904 (Tuesday) ==
- The Kaiser-Friedrich-Museum opened in Berlin for the display of fine art.
- Gustav Mahler's Symphony No. 5 was premiered by the Gürzenich Orchestra Cologne.

== October 19, 1904 (Wednesday) ==
- Polytechnic University of the Philippines was founded as Manila Business School, through the superintendence of G. A. O'Reilly.
- Died:
  - Maurice Baldwin, 68, Canadian Anglican bishop, died after a paralytic stroke.
  - Galen Spencer, 64, American Olympic archer, died one month after winning a gold medal in the team competition at the 1904 Summer Olympics.

== October 20, 1904 (Thursday) ==
- Born: Tommy Douglas, Scottish-born Premier of Saskatchewan and pioneer of medicare; in Camelon, Falkirk, Scotland (d. 1986)

== October 21, 1904 (Friday) ==
- In the Dogger Bank incident of the Russo-Japanese War, the Russian Baltic Fleet fired on British trawlers it mistook for Japanese torpedo boats in the North Sea.
- Died:
  - Euphemia Vale Blake, 87, British-born American critic
  - Isabelle Eberhardt, 27, Swiss explorer, died in a flash flood in Aïn Sefra, French Algeria.
  - Braulio Orue-Vivanco, 61, Cuban Roman Catholic bishop

== October 23, 1904 (Sunday) ==
- An earthquake occurred in Oslo, Norway, at 11:27 CET, which would be the second strongest earthquake in Norway until the 2008 Svalbard earthquake.
- Died: Emilia Dilke, 64, English author

== October 26, 1904 (Wednesday) ==
- Died: Princess Srivilailaksana of Suphanburi, 36, daughter of King Rama V and Pae Bunnag

== October 27, 1904 (Thursday) ==
- The first underground line of the New York City Subway opened.

== October 28, 1904 (Friday) ==
- Panama and Uruguay established diplomatic relations.
