= Hietala =

Hietala is a Finnish surname. Notable people with the surname include:

- Marko Hietala (born 1966), Finnish musician
- Ryan Hietala (born 1973), American golfer
- Ukko Hietala (1904–1990), Finnish modern pentathlete
- Utti Hietala (born 1983), Finnish bodybuilder
- Zachary Hietala (born 1962), Finnish musician
