= Princess Urraca of Bourbon-Two Sicilies =

Princess of Bourbon-Two Sicilies

Princess Urraca
- Born: 14 July 1913; Nymphenburg Palace, Munich, Kingdom of Bavaria
- Died: 3 May 1999 (aged 85); Sigmaringen, Baden-Württemberg, Germany
- Burial: Filialkirche St. Peter und Paul, Rieden, Swabia, Bavaria, Germany
Names
- Italian: Urraca Maria Isabella Carolina Aldegonda Carmela
- House: Bourbon-Two Sicilies
- Father: Prince Ferdinand Pius, Duke of Castro
- Mother: Princess Maria Ludwiga Theresia of Bavaria

Princess Urraca of Bourbon-Two Sicilies (Italian: Urraca Maria Isabella Carolina Aldegonda Carmela, Principessa di Borbone delle Due Sicilie; 14 July 1913, Nymphenburg Palace, Munich, Kingdom of Bavaria – 3 May 1999, Sigmaringen, Baden-Württemberg, Germany) was a member of the House of Bourbon-Two Sicilies and a Princess of Bourbon-Two Sicilies.

== Early life and family ==
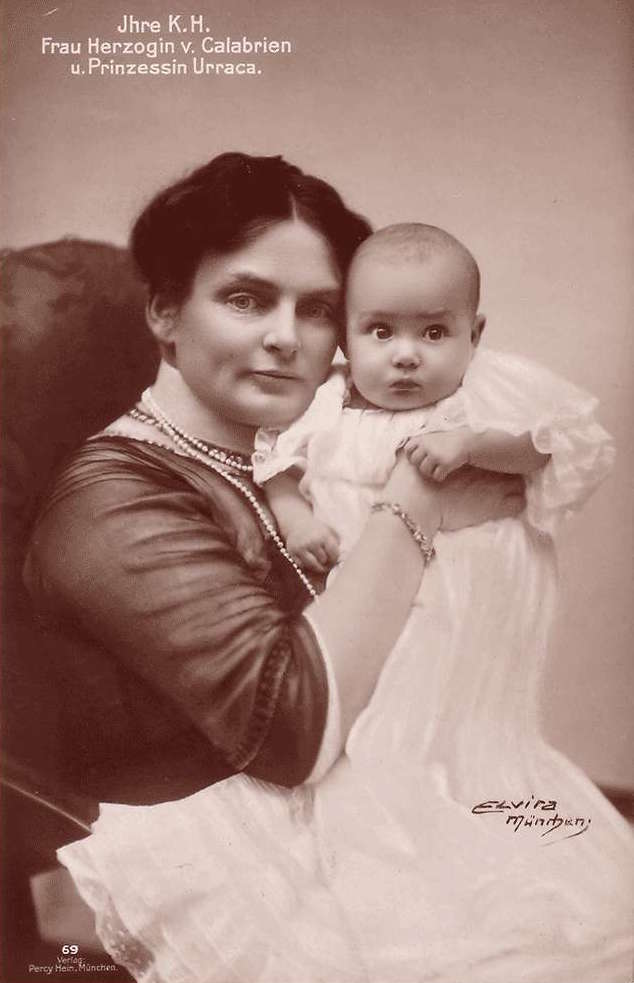
Princess Urraca with her mother

Princess Urraca of Bourbon-Two Sicilies was born on 14 July 1913, at Nymphenburg Palace in Munich, Kingdom of Bavaria. She was the sixth and youngest child of Prince Ferdinand Pius of Bourbon-Two Sicilies, Duke of Castro (1869–1960) and his wife Princess Maria Ludwiga Theresia of Bavaria (1872–1954). Ferdinand Pius was the Head of the House of Bourbon-Two Sicilies and pretender to the defunct throne of the Kingdom of the Two Sicilies from 26 May 1934 to 7 January 1960. Urraca had five older siblings, four sisters and one brother: Princess Maria Antonietta (1898–1957), Princess Maria Cristina (1899–1985), Prince Ruggiero Maria, Duke of Noto (1901–1914), Princess Barbara Maria (1902–1927), and Princess Lucia (1908–2001).

Through her father, Urraca was a granddaughter of Prince Alfonso of Bourbon-Two Sicilies, Count of Caserta (1841–1934) and his wife Princess Maria Antonietta of Bourbon-Two Sicilies (1851–1938). Urraca was descended from King Francis I of the Two Sicilies (1777–1830) through her paternal great-grandfathers, King Ferdinand II of the Two Sicilies (1810–1859) and Prince Francis of Bourbon-Two Sicilies, Count of Trapani (1827–1892). Through her mother, she was a granddaughter of King Ludwig III of Bavaria (1845– 1921) and his wife Archduchess Maria Theresa of Austria-Este (1849–1919).

Urraca chose not to celebrate her birthday, stating: "How can a Bourbon celebrate on the day of the Bastille's taking?"

== Adult life ==
As the daughter of the heir-apparent, then head of the House of Bourbon-Two Sicilies, Urraca regularly represented her family at royal and aristocratic functions and charitable events. She attended the funeral of her great-uncle Prince Leopold of Bavaria on 3 October 1930, at St. Michael's Church in Munich. Urraca, her mother, and her sister Lucia attended an afternoon dance tea at the Hotel Vier Jahreszeiten and the Hungarian Aid Association's Hungarian Ball in Munich in January 1934. She also took part in the closing events of Munich's Carnival celebrations in February 1936. On 16 April 1936, Urraca attended the wedding of her first cousin Infante Alfonso of Spain, Prince of Bourbon-Two Sicilies to Princess Alicia of Bourbon-Parma at the Minoritenkirche in Vienna. She was a guest of honor at the Austrian Armed Forces' Spring Parade in April 1936, along with Alfonso XIII of Spain, Princess Maria Anna of Bourbon-Parma, and Prince Elias of Bourbon-Parma. Urraca attended the Baltic Red Cross Ball and the ball of Countess Adelheid Arco-Valley in the Cherubinsälen of the Hotel Vier Jahreszeiten in February 1938. On 23 October 1957, she attended the wedding of her first cousin Princess Marie Gabrielle of Bavaria and Georg, Prince of Waldburg zu Zeil und Trauchburg in Munich.

On the night of 10 January 1957, Urraca was driving her eldest sister Maria Antonietta to her home in Lindau, Germany, when their automobile collided with a truck that had skid on ice near Winterthur, Switzerland. Maria Antonietta was killed in the accident and Urraca was seriously injured.

Urraca was also an active supporter of Duosicilian historical societies and other royalty and nobility organizations. In October 1993, she attended a conference of over 200 Italian nobles and aristocrats at the Palazzo Pallavicini-Rospigliosi in Rome, which advocated for the nobility's renewed leadership in the defense of Catholic principles in political and cultural institutions. Her first cousin once removed and claimant to the Duosicilian throne, Infante Carlos, Duke of Calabria, was also in attendance. In February 1994, Urraca traveled to Gaeta where she participated in a tribute to the centenary of the death of Francis II, King of the Two Sicilies and an observation of the 133rd anniversary of the conclusion of the Siege of Gaeta which marked the victory of the Kingdom of Sardinia over Two Sicilies.

== Death ==
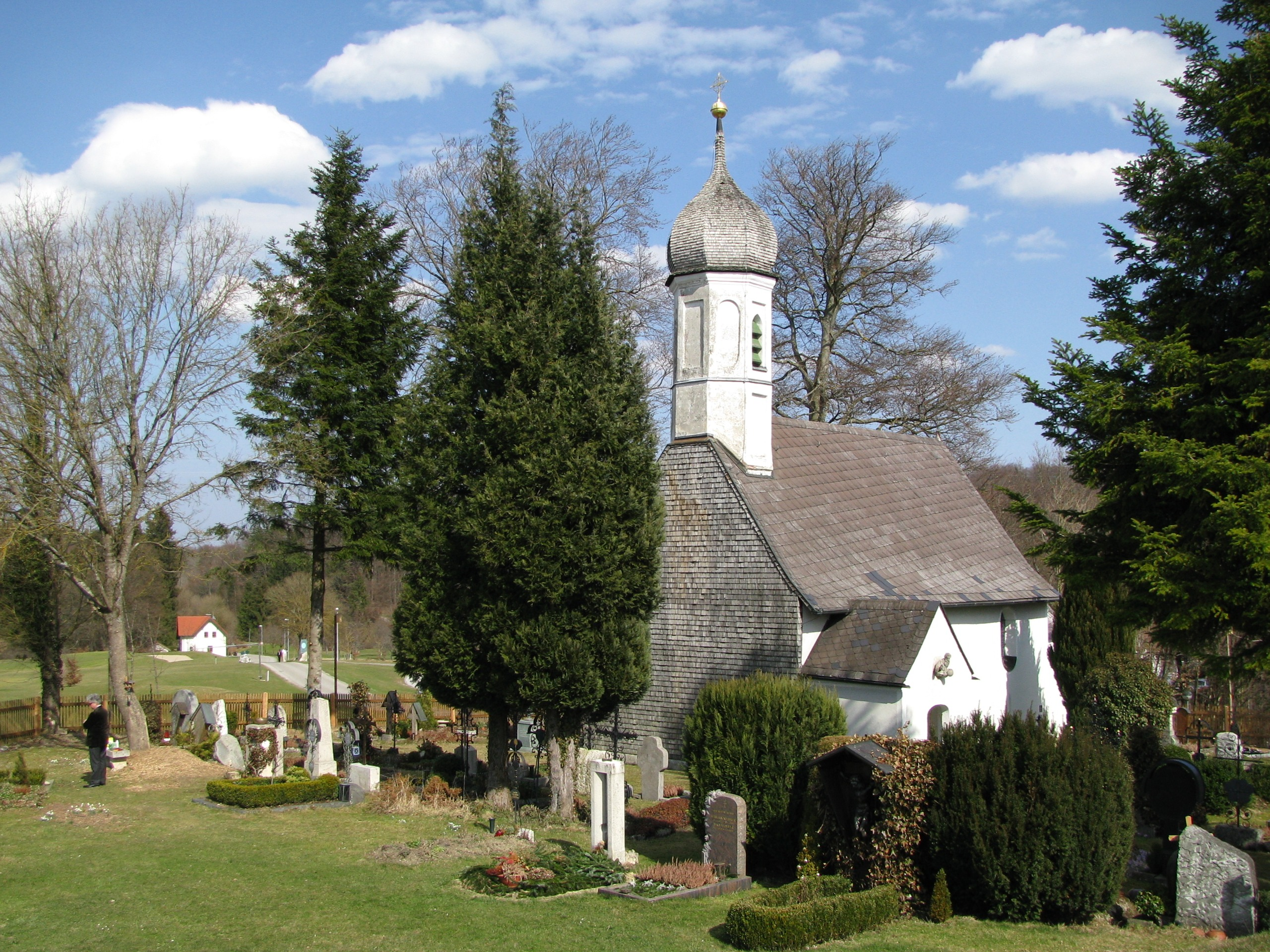
Filialkirche St. Peter und Paul cemetery

Urraca died on 3 May 1999, in Sigmaringen, Baden-Württemberg, Germany.

== Honours ==
- Dame Grand Cross of Justice of the Sacred Military Constantinian Order of Saint George
- Dame of Honor and Devotion of the Sovereign Military Order of Malta

== Ancestry ==
Ancestors of Princess Urraca of Bourbon-Two Sicilies

16. Francis I of the Two Sicilies
8. Ferdinand II of the Two Sicilies
17. Infanta Maria Isabella of Spain
4. Prince Alfonso, Count of Caserta
18. Archduke Charles, Duke of Teschen
9. Archduchess Maria Theresa of Austria
19. Princess Henrietta of Nassau-Weilburg
2. Prince Ferdinand Pius, Duke of Castro
20. Francis I of the Two Sicilies (= 16)
10. Prince Francis, Count of Trapani
21. Infanta Maria Isabella of Spain (= 17)
5. Princess Maria Antonietta of Bourbon-Two Sicilies
22. Leopold II, Grand Duke of Tuscany
11. Archduchess Maria Isabella of Austria
23. Princess Maria Antonia of the Two Sicilies
1. Princess Urraca of Bourbon-Two Sicilies
24. Ludwig I of Bavaria
12. Luitpold, Prince Regent of Bavaria
25. Princess Therese of Saxe-Hildburghausen
6. Ludwig III of Bavaria
26. Leopold II, Grand Duke of Tuscany (= 22)
13. Archduchess Auguste Ferdinande of Austria
27. Princess Maria Anna of Saxony
3. Princess Maria Ludwiga Theresia of Bavaria
28. Francis IV, Duke of Modena
14. Archduke Ferdinand Karl Viktor of Austria-Este
29. Princess Maria Beatrice of Savoy
7. Archduchess Maria Theresa of Austria-Este
30. Archduke Joseph, Palatine of Hungary
15. Archduchess Elisabeth Franziska of Austria
31. Duchess Maria Dorothea of Württemberg
