= September 1904 =

Month of 1904

<<	September 1904					>>
Su	Mo	Tu	We	Th	Fr	Sa
				1	2	3
4	5	6	7	8	9	10
11	12	13	14	15	16	17
18	19	20	21	22	23	24
25	26	27	28	29	30

The following events occurred in September 1904:

== September 1, 1904 (Thursday) ==
- Griffin Park football ground, home of Brentford F.C., opened in London with a Western League fixture versus Plymouth Argyle.

== September 2, 1904 (Friday) ==
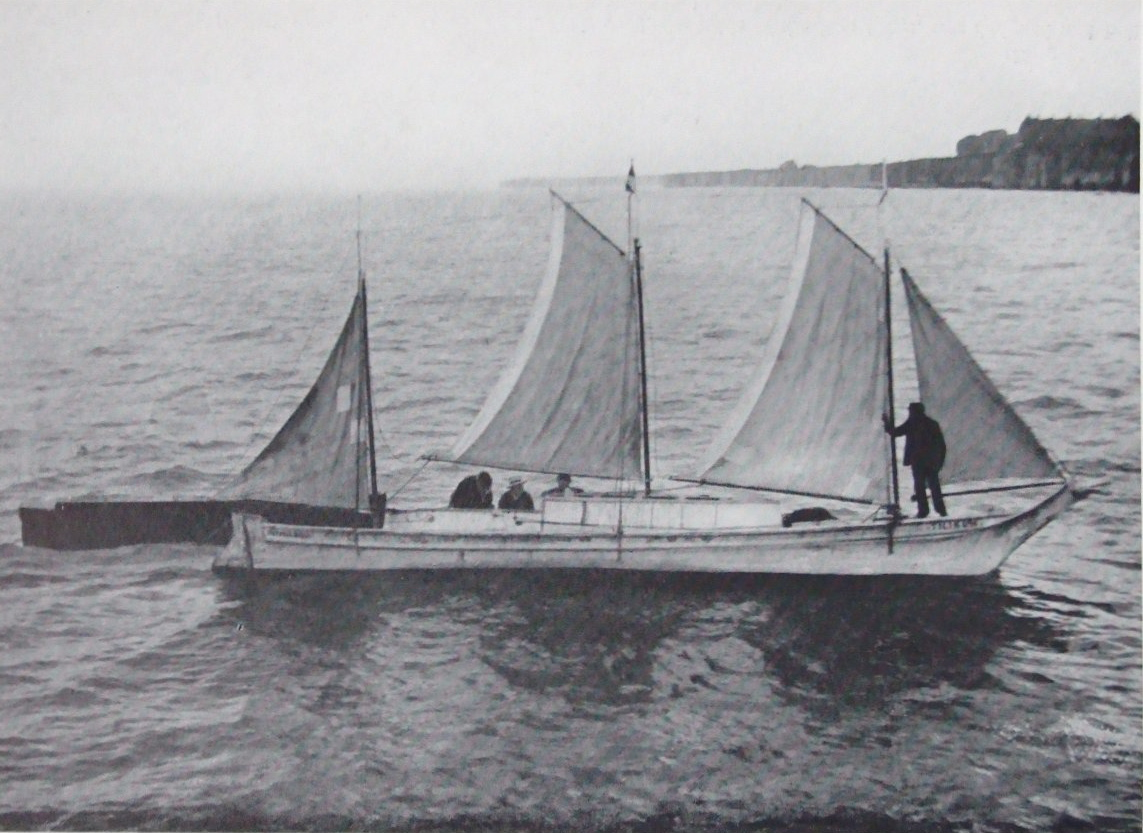
Captain John Voss aboard Tilikum

- John Voss sailed the rigged dugout canoe Tilikum into the River Thames in England after a 3-year voyage from Victoria, British Columbia, westward around the world.
- Died:
  - James Brady, 29, American criminal, died of tuberculosis.
  - Elizabeth Colenso (born Elizabeth Fairburn), 83, New Zealander Protestant missionary

== September 3, 1904 (Saturday) ==
- The Imperial Japanese Navy ship Hayatori sank in Korea Bay off of the Liaotung Peninsula and the town of Ping-tu-tao, after striking an Imperial Russian Navy mine, and 17 sailors were killed.
- Died:
  - James Archer RSA, 81, Scottish artist
  - Heinrich Koebner, 65, German dermatologist

== September 4, 1904 (Sunday) ==
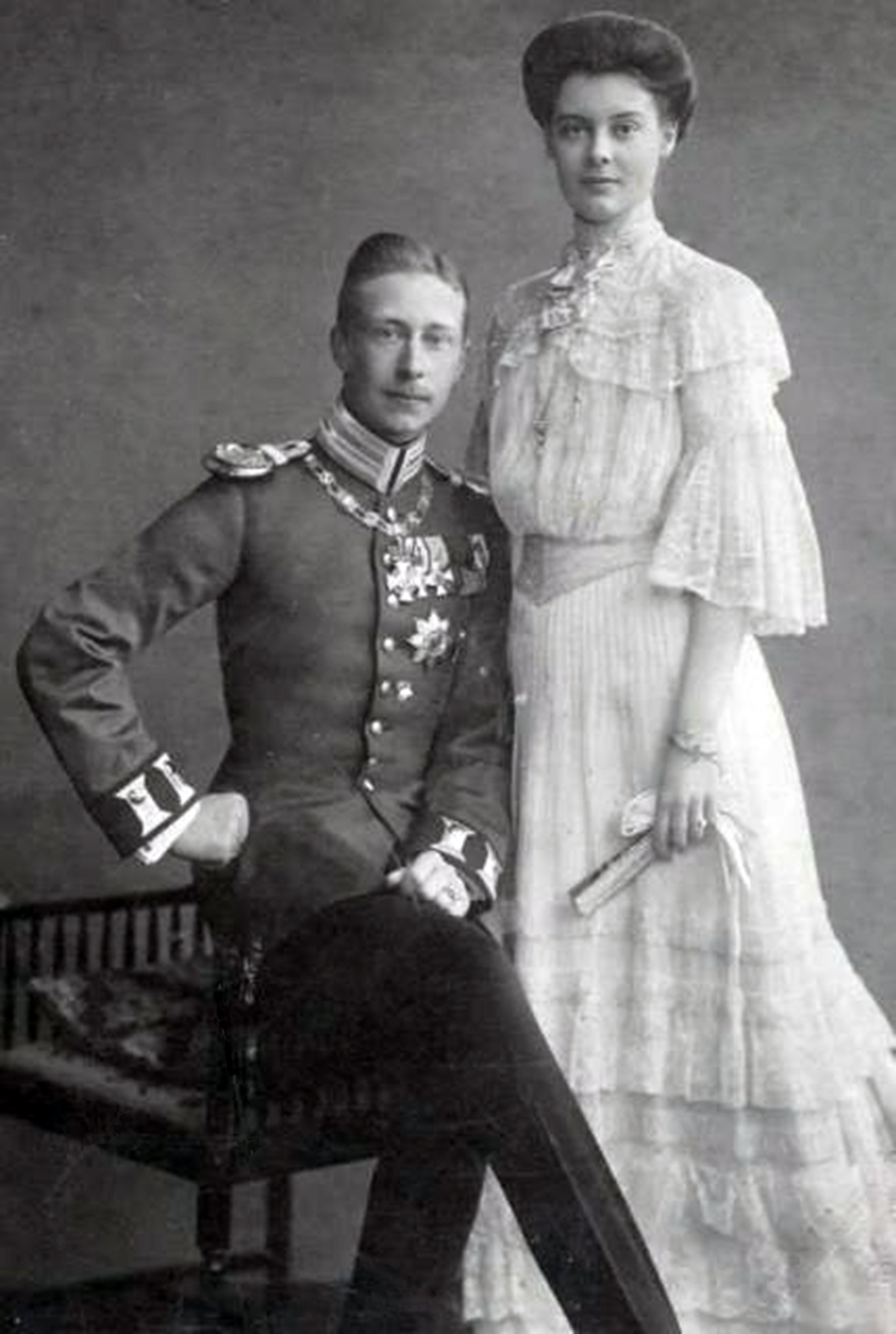
Duchess Cecilie and Wilhelm, German Crown Prince in 1905

- Kaiser Wilhelm II announced the engagement of his son, Wilhelm, German Crown Prince, to Duchess Cecilie of Mecklenburg-Schwerin.
- James S. McCue, the former mayor of Charlottesville, Virginia, whose term of office had ended on September 1, murdered his wife, 42-year-old Fannie Crawford McCue, at their home in Charlottesville. He would be executed by hanging for the crime on February 10, 1905.
- 18-year-old high diver Frank Tait died of injuries sustained while performing at Electric Park, Newark, New Jersey, two weeks earlier.
- Died:
  - Daniel Magone, 77, former Collector of the Port of New York
  - William McCallin, 62, 34th Mayor of Pittsburgh from 1887 to 1890, died of dropsy.

== September 5, 1904 (Monday) ==
- A 15-round match between world welterweight champion boxer Barbados Joe Walcott and Canadian boxer Sam Langford ended in a draw, dismaying spectators who felt that Langford should have received the decision.

== September 6, 1904 (Tuesday) ==
- The derailment of the two rear cars of a Wabash Railroad train a short distance west of Warrenton, Missouri, killed 8 people and injured 50.
- Born:
  - Groff Conklin, American science fiction anthologist; in Glen Ridge, New Jersey (d. 1968)
  - Emery Reves, writer, publisher and literary agent; in Bácsföldvár, Austria-Hungary (d. 1981)
- Died: Per Sivle, 47, Norwegian poet, novelist and newspaper editor, suicide by firearm.

== September 7, 1904 (Wednesday) ==
- As a result of the British expedition to Tibet, the Dalai Lama signed the Anglo-Tibetan Treaty with Colonel Francis Younghusband.
- Horace Maples, an African-American man who had been accused of murder, was lynched by a mob of approximately 2,000 people in Huntsville, Alabama.
- Born: Daniel Prenn, Russian-born German, Polish, and British tennis player; in Vilna, Russian Empire (d. 1991)

== September 8, 1904 (Thursday) ==
- Died: George C. Lorimer, 66, American Baptist minister, died of pneumonia.

== September 9, 1904 (Friday) ==
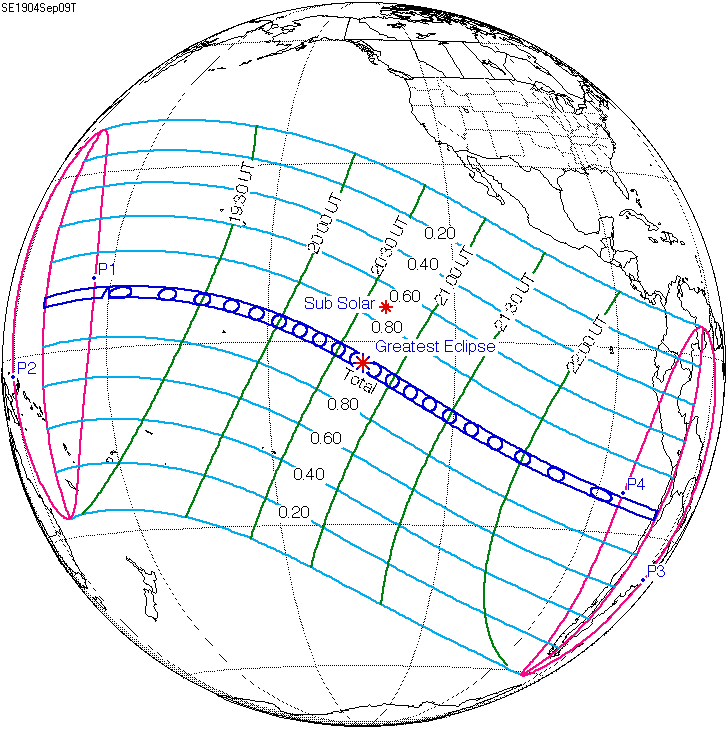
Total solar eclipse of September 9, 1904

- A total solar eclipse was visible from northern Chile.
- Born: Feroze Khan, Pakistani field hockey player; in Basti Daneshmandan, Jalandhar, Punjab Province (British India) (d. 2005)

== September 10, 1904 (Saturday) ==
- RRS Discovery docked in Portsmouth upon its return from the British National Antarctic Expedition, on which it had set out in 1901.
- Died: Leo Stern, 42, English cellist

== September 11, 1904 (Sunday) ==
- Cork GAA defeated London GAA, 3-13 to 0-0 (equivalent to 22 to 0), to win the hurling championship of Ireland at the Cork Athletic Grounds.
- At the Heidelberg Observatory in Germany, astronomer Paul Götz discovered the asteroid (minor planet) 543 Charlotte.

== September 12, 1904 (Monday) ==
- Born: Lou Moore, American race car driver and team owner; in Hinton, Oklahoma Territory (d. 1956, brain hemorrhage)

== September 13, 1904 (Tuesday) ==
- Born: Gladys George, American stage and screen actress nominated for the Academy Award for Best Actress for Valiant Is the Word for Carrie; in Patten, Maine (d. 1954)
- Died: Surgeon-General James Jameson CB, 67, British Army surgeon

== September 14, 1904 (Wednesday) ==
- Born:
  - Frank Amyot, Canadian Olympic champion sprint canoeist; in Thornhill, Ontario (d. 1962, cancer)
  - Richard Mohaupt, German composer, Kapellmeister; in Breslau (d. 1957)

== September 15, 1904 (Thursday) ==
- Born: Umberto II of Italy, 4th and last King of Italy; in Racconigi, Piedmont (d. 1983)

== September 16, 1904 (Friday) ==
- The 1904 Italian general strike, the first general strike in the nation's history, began at noon.

== September 17, 1904 (Saturday) ==
- An early study on the relationship between alcohol and cardiovascular disease was published in the United States.
- Died:
  - Kartini, 25, Indonesian national heroine, women's rights activist, died from complications of childbirth.
  - Willard Fiske, 72, American librarian and scholar

== September 18, 1904 (Sunday) ==
- The Japanese Navy ship Heien sank after striking a mine in Pigeon Bay off of China's Liaotung Peninsula, killing 196 of its 200 crew. Four survivors were discovered the next day on Reef Island.
- Died: Herbert von Bismarck, 54, Foreign Minister of Germany from 1896 to 1890, son of the late chancellor Otto von Bismarck, died from liver failure caused by alcoholism.

== September 19, 1904 (Monday) ==
- Born: Elvia Allman, American actress; in Enochville, North Carolina (d. 1992)

== September 20, 1904 (Tuesday) ==
- Died:
  - R. W. H. T. Hudson, 28, British mathematician, died in a mountaineering accident.
  - José Maria de Yermo y Parres, 52, Mexican Roman Catholic priest and saint, died of a stomach ulcer.

== September 21, 1904 (Wednesday) ==
- Died: Chief Joseph, 64, Nez Perce leader, died of a broken heart.

== September 22, 1904 (Thursday) ==
- Born: Lessie Brown, former oldest living American; in Georgia (d. 2019)
- Died: Louis Massebieau, 64, French historian and Protestant theologian

== September 23, 1904 (Friday) ==
- At a school in Pleasant Ridge, Cincinnati, the floor of the girls' outhouse collapsed. Nine young girls drowned in the waste of the vault beneath.
- Died:
  - George Adams, 65, Australian businessman
  - Harrison Allen, 68, American soldier and politician, died of mitral insufficiency with heart failure.
  - Émile Gallé, 58, French artist

== September 24, 1904 (Saturday) ==
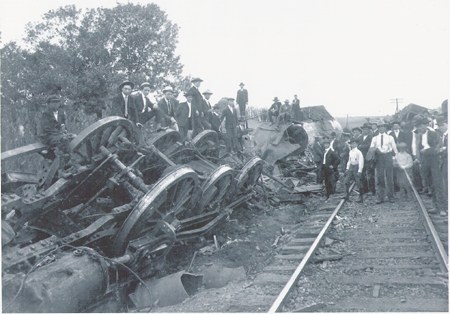
New Market train wreck

- Near New Market, Tennessee, two Southern Railway passenger trains traveling at great speed collided head on, killing between 56 and 113 passengers and crew and injuring 106.
- Died:
  - Niels Ryberg Finsen, 43, Icelandic/Faroese/Danish physician and scientist, recipient of the Nobel Prize in Physiology or Medicine in 1903
  - Franklin Edson, 72, American merchant, former Mayor of New York City
  - Gustav Frank, 71, German-born Austrian Protestant theologian
  - Caleb C. Harris, 68, American farmer and physician, former member of the Wisconsin State Assembly, died after surgery for peritonitis.
  - Colin Hunter ARA, 63, Scottish painter
  - Frederic W. Rhinelander, 76, president of the Metropolitan Museum of Art

== September 25, 1904 (Sunday) ==
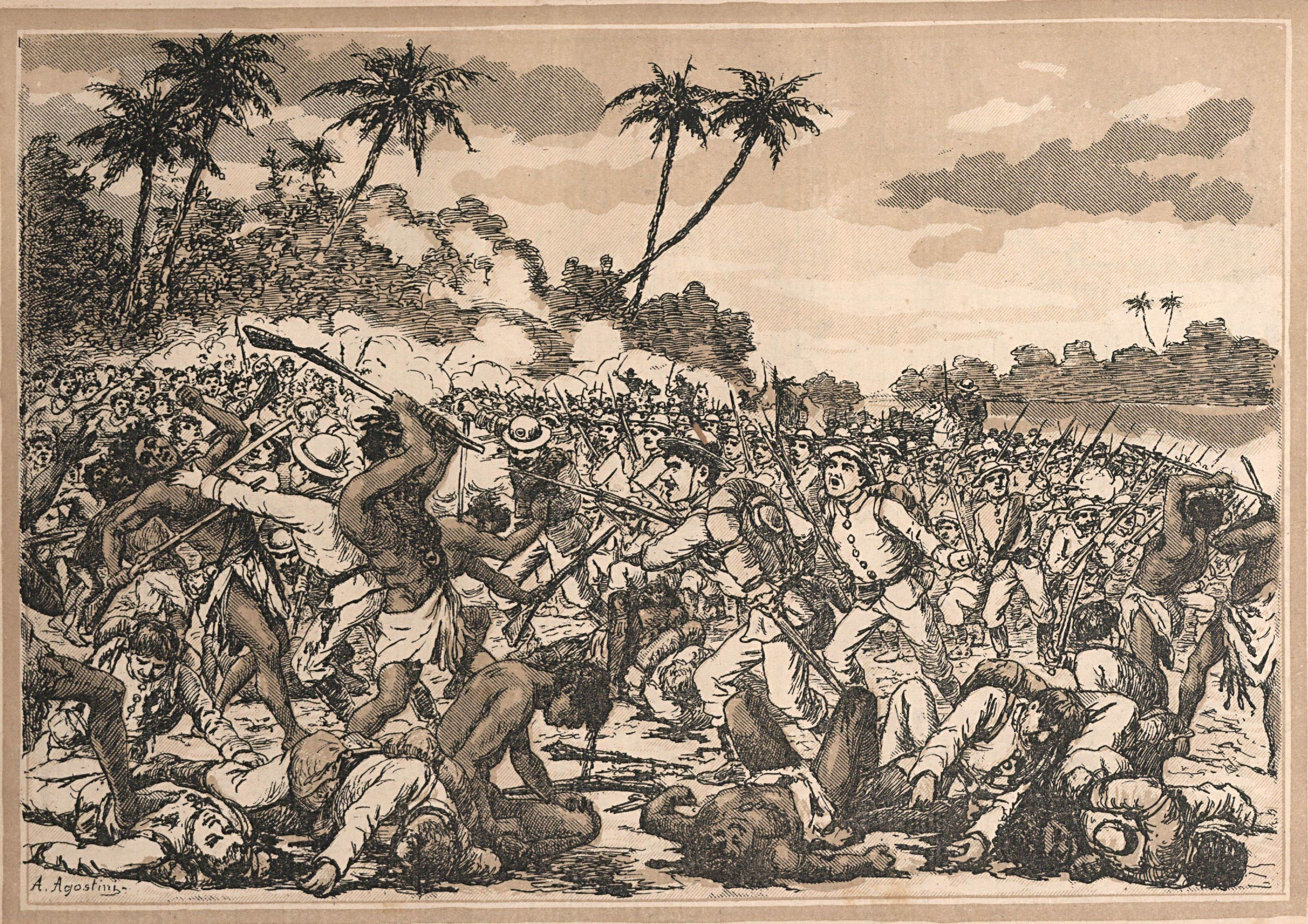
Battle of the Cunene

- The Battle of the Cunene was fought in the colony of Portuguese West Africa (now Angola). Warriors from the indigenous Ovambo people, led by King Tchetekelo, ambushed a force of about 500 Portuguese colonial troops and Humbi collaborators and killed 114 colonials and more than 200 Vau de Pembe (now Ombadja, Angola) on the banks of the Cunene River.

== September 26, 1904 (Monday) ==
- New Zealand dolphin Pelorus Jack was individually protected by Order in Council under the Sea Fisheries Act.
- Born: Constantin Doncea, Romanian communist activist and politician; in Cocu, Argeș (d. 1973)
- Died:
  - Ernest, Count of Lippe-Biesterfeld, 62
  - Lafcadio Hearn (aka Yakumo Koizumi), 54, Greek-Irish Japanese author, died of heart disease.

== September 27, 1904 (Tuesday) ==
- Died: David G. Colson, 43, American politician, U.S. Representative from Kentucky

== September 28, 1904 (Wednesday) ==
- At Musaymir (now part of Ali Mana became the new Sultan of Haushabi, a semi-autonomous state within the British Aden Protectorate (now in Yemen), upon the death of Sultan Muhsin bin Ali.
- The U.S. port of Texas City, Texas received its first ocean-going ship, SS Piqua, although dredging of the harbor was not completed.

== September 29, 1904 (Thursday) ==
- Born:
  - Greer Garson, English-American actress, 7-time Academy Award nominee, winner of the Academy Award for Best Actress for Mrs. Miniver; in Manor Park, County Borough of East Ham, Essex (d. 1996)
  - Michał Waszyński, Polish film director and producer; in Kowel (d. 1965)

== September 30, 1904 (Friday) ==
- Died: George F. Hoar, 78, American politician, U.S. Senator from Massachusetts
