= Princess Isabel Alfonsa of Bourbon-Two Sicilies =

Spanish and Sicilian royal (1904–1985)

Isabel Alfonsa of Spain
- Countess Jan Kanty Zamoyski
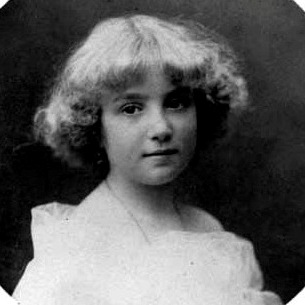
- Isabel Alfonsa de Borbón as a child
- Born: 16 October 1904; Madrid, Kingdom of Spain
- Died: 18 July 1985 (aged 80); Madrid, Spain
- Spouse: Count Jan Kanty Zamoyski (m. 1929; died 1961)
- Issue: Count Karol Alfons; Countess Maria Cristina; Count Joseph Michael; Countess Maria Teresa
Names
- Spanish: Isabel Alfonsa María Teresa Antonia Cristina Mercedes Carolina Adelaida Rafaela
- House: Bourbon-Two Sicilies (agnatic); Bourbon (enatic)
- Father: Prince Carlos of Bourbon-Two Sicilies
- Mother: María de las Mercedes, Princess of Asturias

Princess Isabel Alfonsa of Bourbon-Two Sicilies, Infanta of Spain (Spanish: Isabel Alfonsa de Borbón-Dos Sicilias; 16 October 1904 – 18 July 1985) was a member of the House of Bourbon-Two Sicilies by birth. Through her marriage, she also became a member of the Zamoyski family.

== Family ==
Isabel Alfonsa was born on 16 October 1904 in Madrid, the youngest child of Prince Carlos of Bourbon-Two Sicilies and his first wife, María de las Mercedes, Princess of Asturias. Her mother, who held the position of heiress presumptive to the Spanish throne, died one day following her birth due to complications from childbirth. Her maternal grandparents were King Alfonso XII of Spain and Maria Christina of Austria, establishing her direct lineage within the senior branch of the Spanish.

== Court life and dynastic role ==
Raised under the direct guardianship of her uncle, King Alfonso XIII of Spain, Isabel Alfonsa maintained active representation duties at the court of Madrid during her youth. Following her marriage, she and her family relocated to Czechoslovakia, where they established their permanent residence at the ancestral Zamoyski estates in Stará Ľubovňa and Vyšné Ružbachy.

During her tenure in Central Europe, she financed and managed regional philanthropic initiatives, developing local spa infrastructure and providing social welfare support to agricultural communities. Following the geopolitical transitions and property expropriations at the end of World War II, she returned to Spain, where she dedicated her later decades to religious devotions and the preservation of dynastic archival records until her death in 1985.

== Marriage and issue ==
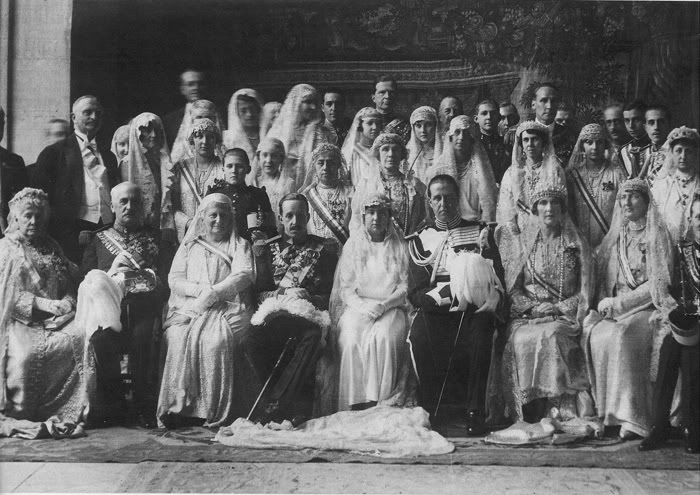
The wedding of Princess Isabel Alfonsa and Count Jan Kanty Zamoysky, 1929.

On 9 March 1929, Isabel Alfonsa married her first cousin once removed, Count Jan Kanty Zamoyski, the seventh child of Count Andrzej Zamoyski and Princess Maria Carolina of Bourbon-Two Sicilies, in Madrid. The union produced four children:

- Count Karol Alfons Zamoyski (1930–1979).
- Countess Maria Krystyna Zamoyska (1932–1959).
- Count Józef Michał Zamoyski (1935–2010), married Maria Antónia Navarro y González in 1974 and had issue
- Countess Maria Teresa Zamoyska (born 1938).

== Honours ==
- (Spain) Dame Grand Cross of Justice of the Sacred Military Constantinian Order of Saint George
- (Spain) 1003rd Dame of the Order of Queen Maria Luisa

=== Arms ===
Heraldry of Princess Isabel Alfonsa of Bourbon-Two Sicilies

Coat of Arms of Isabel Alfonsa as Infanta of Spain and Countess Zamoyska

Coat of Arms of Isabel Alfonsa as Infanta of Spain and widow

== Ancestry ==
Ancestors of Princess Isabel Alfonsa of Bourbon-Two Sicilies

8. Ferdinand II of the Two Sicilies
4. Prince Alfonso, Count of Caserta
9. Archduchess Maria Theresa of Austria
2. Prince Carlos of Bourbon-Two Sicilies
10. Prince Francis, Count of Trapani
5. Princess Maria Antonietta of Bourbon-Two Sicilies
11. Archduchess Maria Isabella of Austria
1. Infanta Isabel Alfonsa of Spain
12. Infante Francisco de Asís of Spain
6. Alfonso XII of Spain
13. Isabella II of Spain
3. María de las Mercedes, Princess of Asturias
14. Archduke Karl Ferdinand of Austria
7. Archduchess Maria Christina of Austria
15. Archduchess Elisabeth Franziska of Austria
