= Jan Kanty Zamoyski =

Polish aristocrat

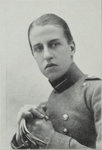
- Zamoyski in 1920.
- Born: 4 August 1900
- Died: 28 September 1961 (aged 61)
- Noble family: Zamoyski
- Spouse: Princess Isabel Alfonsa of Bourbon-Two Sicilies (m. 1929)
- Issue: Count Karol Alfons; Countess Maria Cristina; Count Joseph Michael; Countess Maria Teresa
- Father: Count Andrzej Przemysław Zamoyski
- Mother: Princess Maria Carolina of the Two Sicilies

Count Jan Kanty Zamoyski (4 August 1900 – 28 September 1961) was a Polish aristocrat.

He was the son of Count Andrzej Przemysław Zamoyski and Princess Maria Carolina of Bourbon-Two Sicilies, granddaughter of King Francis I of the Two Sicilies.

He was the last owner of the Ľubovňa Castle, Vyšné Ružbachy and Mníšek in Spiš.

Jelita Coat of Arms.

== Marriage and issue ==
Jan Kanty married Princess Isabel Alfonsa of Bourbon-Two Sicilies on 9 March 1929 in Madrid and had four children:

- Count Karol Alfons Zamoyski (28 October 1930 – 26 October 1979)
- Countess Maria Krystyna Zamoyska (2 September 1932 – 6 December 1959)
- Count Józef Michal Zamoyski (27 June 1935 - 22/23 May 2010)
- Countess Maria Teresa Zamoyska (born 18 April 1938)
