= Princess Maria Carolina of the Two Sicilies (born 1856) =

Princess Maria Carolina
- Countess Maria Carolina Zamoyska
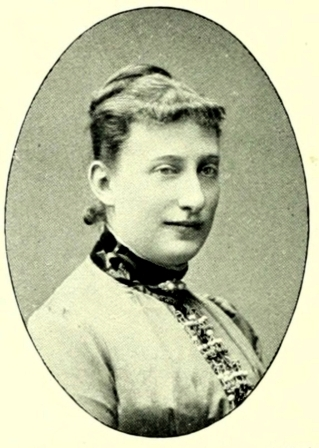
- Maria Carolina in 1889
- Born: 20 March 1856; Naples, Kingdom of the Two Sicilies
- Died: 7 April 1941 (aged 85); Warsaw, Nazi Germany
- Spouse: Count Andrzej Przemysław Zamoyski (m. 1885; died 1927)
- Issue: Countess Marie Josepha Zamoyska; Count Franz Joseph Zamoyski; Count Stanislaus Zamoyski; Countess Marie Isabelle Zamoyska; Countess Marie Therese Zamoyska; Countess Marie Karoline Zamoyska; Count Jan Kanty Zamoyski
Names
- Italian: Maria Carolina Giuseppina Ferdinanda Annunziata Gioacchina Sabazia Isabella Francesca di Paola Antonia
- House: Bourbon-Two Sicilies
- Father: Prince Francis, Count of Trapani
- Mother: Archduchess Maria Isabella of Austria

Princess Maria Carolina Giuseppina Ferdinanda of the Two Sicilies, full Italian name: Maria Carolina Giuseppina Ferdinanda di Borbone, Principessa delle Due Sicilie (20 March 1856, Naples, Kingdom of the Two Sicilies; 7 April 1941, Warsaw, Greater German Reich) was a member of the House of Bourbon-Two Sicilies and a Princess of Bourbon-Two Sicilies by birth and Countess Zamoyska through her marriage to Polish nobleman Count Andrzej Przemysław Zamoyski.

== Family ==
Maria Carolina was the fourth child and third-eldest daughter of Prince Francis of Bourbon-Two Sicilies, Count of Trapani and his wife Archduchess Maria Isabella of Austria, Princess of Tuscany.

== Marriage and issue ==
Maria Carolina married Andrzej Przemysław Zamoyski (1852-1927), son of Count Stanisław Kostka Andrzej Zamoyski and his wife, Rosa Maria Eva Potocka, on 18 November 1885 in Paris, France. Maria Carolina and Andrzej had seven children:

- Countess Marie Josepha Zamoyska (23 May 1887 – 17 February 1961), married firstly Prince Karol Radziwill and secondly Johann Bisping.
- Count Franz Joseph Zamoyski (1888–1948), married Countess Sophie Broel-Plater.
- Count Stanislaus Zamoyski (1889–1913).
- Countess Marie Isabelle Zamoyska (1891–1957), married Stefan Brzozowski.
- Countess Marie Therese Zamoyska (1894–1953), married Count Jerzy Jezierski.
- Countess Marie Karoline Zamoyska (22 September 1896 – 9 May 1968); married her cousin Prince Ranieri, Duke of Castro. Marie and Ranieri are the parents of Prince Ferdinand, Duke of Castro.
- Count Jan Kanty Zamoyski (17 August 1900 – 28 September 1961), married Princess Isabel Alfonsa of Bourbon-Two Sicilies (1904–1985), granddaughter of Alfonso XII of Spain.

== Ancestry ==
Ancestors of Princess Maria Carolina of the Two Sicilies (born 1856)

8. Ferdinand I of the Two Sicilies
4. Francis I of the Two Sicilies
9. Archduchess Maria Carolina of Austria
2. Prince Francis, Count of Trapani
10. Charles IV of Spain
5. Infanta Maria Isabella of Spain
11. Princess Maria Luisa of Parma
1. Princess Maria Carolina of Bourbon-Two Sicilies
12. Ferdinand III, Grand Duke of Tuscany
6. Leopold II, Grand Duke of Tuscany
13. Princess Luisa of Naples and Sicily
3. Archduchess Maria Isabella of Austria
14. Francis I of the Two Sicilies (= 4)
7. Princess Maria Antonia of the Two Sicilies
15. Infanta Maria Isabella of Spain (= 5)

== Descendants ==
Maria Carolina is a great-great-grandmother of former UFC Middleweight Champion Michael Bisping.

== Honours ==
- Spain : 1174th Dame of the Order of Queen Maria Luisa - .
