= Tomo Vladimirski =

Tomo Vladimirski (Macedonian: Томо Владамирски; 1904–1971) was a Macedonian painter, considered to be one of the founders of Macedonian painting.

== Career ==
Artist during the War period were limited in their creativity due to necessary condition for artistic creation; therefore, the number of paintings they contributed were relatively small in quantity. Vladimirski, along with Vasilie Popovich – Cico, Dimo Todorovski, Nikola Martinoski, Borko Lazesk, are who were affected by conditions of the time. In addition to being a painter, he worked with Nikola MartinoskiIn and Vasilije Cico Popovic to create a number of stage designs. These stage designs were reported to give the a sense of realism to the acting in the plays, operas, and ballets during the time period, post World War II.

== Painting style ==
He was a landscape painter who painted the natural beauty of Macedonia. He used elements of realism in the beginning and later the phase of impressionism and retaining the lyrical expressionism. His paintings of landscapes were the most notable. Senior custodian in the National Gallery, Mirjana Talevska describes Vladimirski's work, "by describing an area, he turns his painting into a personal diary of his urges and moods". Vladimirski also created still lifes and motifs from urban panoramas with a frequent focus on the landscapes around the rivers Radika and Vardar.
