= Utti Hietala =

Finnish bodybuilder

- professional bodybuilder

Personal info
- Nickname: Hulkki
- Born: January 13, 1983 (age 42); Turku, Finland

Best statistics
- Height: 1.88 m (6 ft 2 in)
- Weight: Contest: 92-93 kg (203-205 lb), Off season: 100-105 kg(220-231 lb)

Professional (Pro) career
- Best win: 2008 CBB Finnish overall Champion; 2008
- Active: Since 2006

Utti "Hulkki" Hietala (born January 13, 1983) is a Finnish bodybuilder competing in Classic Bodybuilding (CBB), which is the Finnish bodybuilding association for naturals. His bodybuilding-related blog is Finland's most popular bodybuilding blog based on the amount of traffic. He is known especially as a spokesman of natural bodybuilding. In addition he is the standard face in Fast's bodybuilding based GYM-TV.

Hietala started lifting weights at the age of 14, when he played basketball. He started bodybuilding type of training in the spring of 2000. In 2006 he competed in his first Classic Bodybuilding GP winning in Turku and placing second in the Finnish national championships in Lahti. Due to his success, he was selected to represent his country Finland in the Scandinavian Championships, where he placed seventh. In 2008, he won Classic Bodybuilding championships in the tall series (+178 cm) and overall. He placed fifth in the Scandinavian Championships in 2008. Hietala plans to compete next time in 2010.

== Achievements ==
- 2008: Classic BB PM 2008 (5th)
- 2008: Classic BB SM 2008 (+178 cm 1st)
- 2008: Turku Body & Fitness 2008, Classic BB (1st)
- 2006: Classic BB PM 2006 (7th)
- 2006: Classic BB SM 2006 (+178 2nd)
- 2006: Turku Body & Fitness 2006, Classic BB (1st)
- 1998: Triple Jump U-16 Finnish Champion
- 1997: Triple Jump U-15 Finnish Champion and U-15 Long Jump silver medalist
