= Franz Horn =

German footballer (1904–1963)

Personal information
- Date of birth: 26 August 1904
- Place of birth: Essen, Germany
- Date of death: 22 September 1963 (aged 59)
- Position: Striker

Senior career*
Years	Team	Apps	(Gls)
1923–1924	Essener TB		
1924–1926	Schwarz-Weiß Essen		
1926–1932	Hamburger SV		
1932–1935	Schwarz-Weiß Essen		

International career
1928–1929	Germany	3	(0)
- * Club domestic league appearances and goals

Franz Horn (26 August 1904 – 22 September 1963) was a German international footballer. He was part of Germany's team at the 1928 Summer Olympics, but he did not play in any matches.
