= 1904 Oslo earthquake =

5.4 magnitude earthquake in Norway

- Location within Norway
- UTC time: 1904-10-23 10:27:22
- USGS-ANSS: ComCat
- Local date: 23 October 1904
- Local time: 11:27 CET
- Magnitude: 5.4 M_{L}
- Epicenter: 58.93°N 10.73°E
- Areas affected: Norway, Sweden, Denmark
- Max. intensity: MMI VII (Very strong)

The 1904 Oslo earthquake occurred on 23 October at 11:27 CET, in Oslo, Norway. The earthquake was the second strongest earthquake in Norway until the 2008 Svalbard earthquake.

== Impact ==
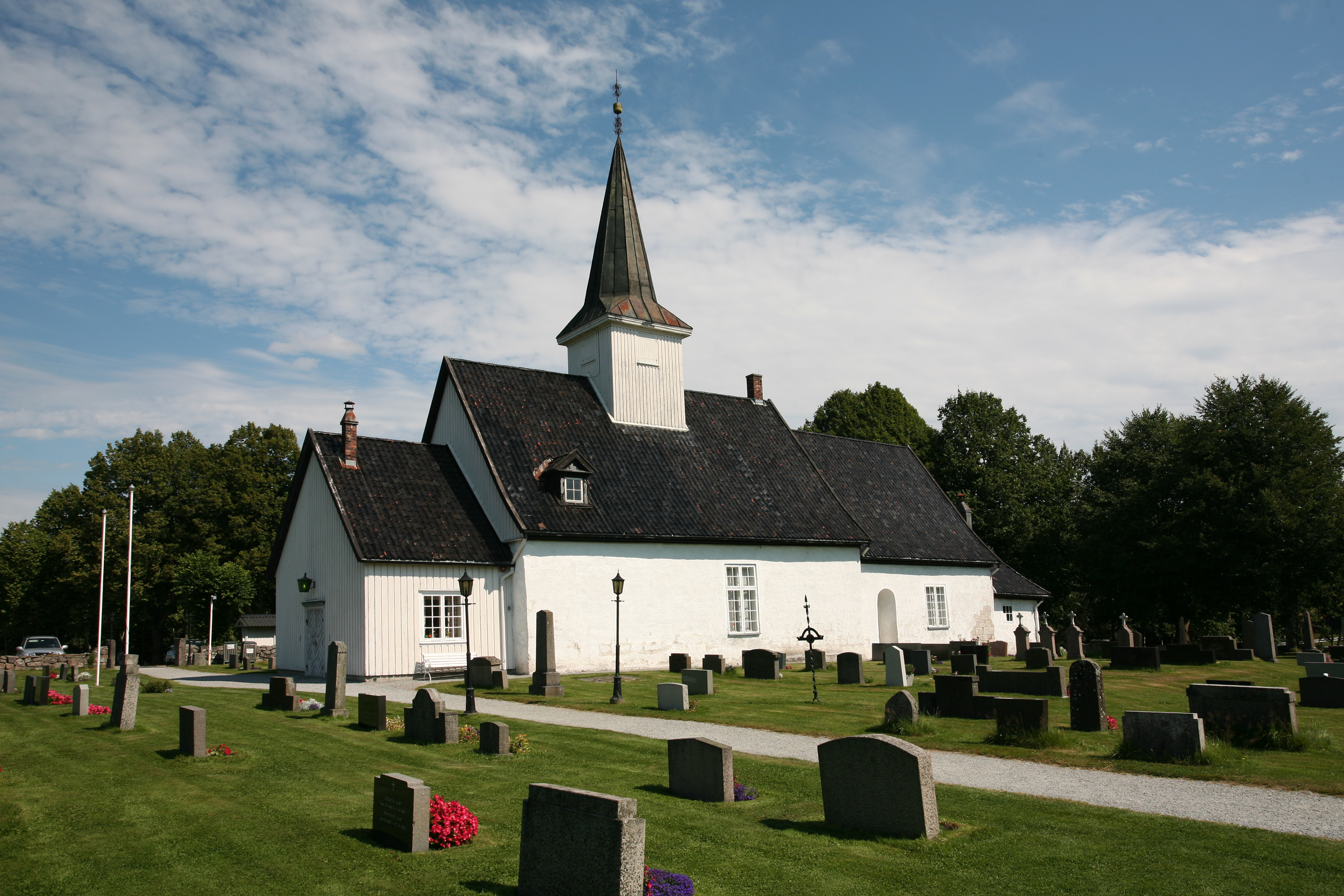
Idd Church near Halden was heavily damaged in the earthquake but was repaired

The earthquake was felt in the southern part of the Oslofjord, in the area between Moss, Halden, and Tønsberg, but was also very noticeable in Oslo, where it caused damage to Johannes Church, among other places.

The earthquake possibly had its epicenter in the Skagerrak, about one and a half miles from both Færder Lighthouse in Vestfold, Akerøya in Østfold, and Nordkoster in Strömstad. It could be felt as far away as Namsos, Pomerania (in present-day Poland), the Baltics, and Helsinki. The earthquake occurred during a church service, causing panic in many churches around the Oslofjord, in Sweden, and in Aalborg, Denmark, but no one died.

Johannes Church in Oslo, which stood on a weak foundation and already had cracks before the earthquake occurred, was so heavily damaged by the tremor that it was closed and later demolished. Idd Church near Halden was also severely damaged, but it could be repaired. In Oslo, Olaf Norli's bookstore on Universitetsgata was damaged.

The earthquake is the strongest to have struck Sweden in modern times. The seismograph in Uppsala, installed earlier that year as the first in Scandinavia, was shaken so violently that the pendulum jumped out of its socket, rendering the seismograph unable to measure the quake. However, it was recorded by seismographs in Dorpat (Tartu), Leipzig, Göttingen, Hamburg, and Edinburgh, among others. Many chimneys collapsed, minor landslides were triggered, and tsunamis occurred both on the Swedish west coast and in Lake Vänern and other lakes. In two locations, unsecured railway wagons were set in motion, though they did not cause any accidents.

== See also ==
- List of earthquakes in 1904
- Geology of Norway
- 2008 Skåne County earthquake
