= Lynching of Horace Maples =

1904 lynching event

- Location: Huntsville, Alabama
- Date: September 7, 1904

Horace Maples was an African-American man who was lynched by a mob of approximately 2,000 people in Huntsville, Alabama, on September 7, 1904. Maples had been accused of murder and was being held in the county jail when it was set on fire by the crowd. He jumped from a second story window in the jail, but was seized by the crowd and hanged on a tree on the courthouse lawn. Maples' body was then shot full of bullets by people in the crowd.

A state court grand jury returned indictments against some of those who actively participated in the lynching, but these were overturned. Later, however, federal judge Thomas Goode Jones, a former Confederate, ruled that the lynchers had violated federal laws.

== Memorial ==
A memorial in Maples' memory and his death was established at the Madison County Courthouse on September 7, 2020.
