= María de las Mercedes, Princess of Asturias =

Princess of Asturias (1880–1904)

María de las Mercedes
- Princess of Asturias; Princess Carlos of Bourbon-Two Sicilies
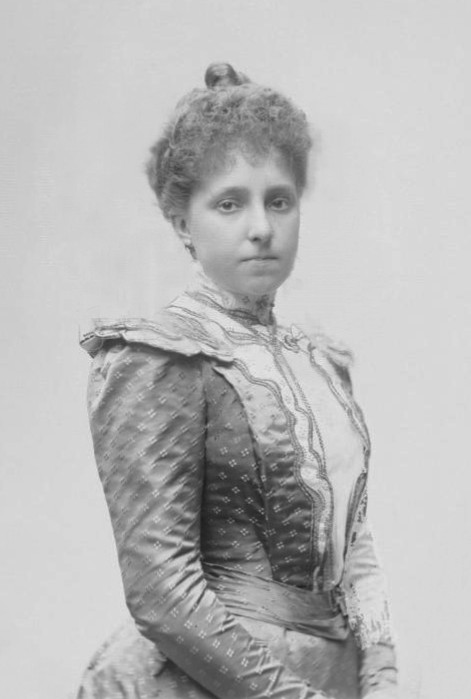
- 1903 portrait
- Born: 11 September 1880; Royal Palace of Madrid, Spain
- Died: 17 October 1904 (aged 24); Madrid
- Burial: El Escorial
- Spouse: Prince Carlos of the Two Sicilies (m. 1901)
- Issue: Infante Alfonso, Duke of Calabria; Infante Fernando; Isabel Alfonsa, Countess Zamoyska
Names
- María de las Mercedes Isabel Teresa Cristina Alfonsa de Borbón y Habsburgo-Lorena
- House: Bourbon
- Father: Alfonso XII of Spain
- Mother: Maria Christina of Austria

María de las Mercedes, Princess of Asturias (María de las Mercedes de Borbón y Habsburgo-Lorena; 11 September 1880 – 17 October 1904) was the eldest child of King Alfonso XII of Spain and his second wife, Maria Christina of Austria. She was Princess of Asturias, the heiress presumptive to the Crown of Spain, for all 24 years of her life.

Had her younger sibling, unborn at the death of Alfonso XII, been a daughter, Mercedes would have been Queen of Spain. The sibling proved to be a boy, Alfonso XIII, and upon his birth in 1886, he was King, and Mercedes turned out not to be queen. She resumed the position of heiress presumptive, which she held until her own death (aged 24), and was succeeded in it by her own infant son Alfonso, Alfonso XIII having not yet married and fathered a legitimate child.

Mercedes married in Madrid on 14 February 1901, her second cousin, Prince Carlos of Bourbon-Two Sicilies, a nephew of the King of the then-defunct Kingdom of the Two Sicilies, who was elevated to the rank of Infante of Spain. The marriage was highly controversial due to her father-in-law's ties with the Carlists. She died three years later from complications while giving birth to her third child.

== Early life ==
Born on 11 September 1880 at the Royal Palace of Madrid, Mercedes was the first child of King Alfonso XII and his second wife, Maria Christina of Austria. She was christened María de las Mercedes Isabel Teresa Cristina Alfonsa. Her godmother was Queen Isabella II, her paternal grandmother, who came from retirement in Paris to attend the birth of her first grandchild. There was great disappointment because family and nation were hoping for a boy. To smooth things out, Queen Maria Christina suggested giving their new daughter the name Mercedes in honor of her husband's first wife and Queen, Mercedes of Orléans.

Mercedes was heiress presumptive at birth, but the disappointment was so great that she was initially treated only as an infanta. Antonio Cánovas del Castillo, then head of the government, who disliked Maria Christina and did not want the crown to pass again to a female after the disastrous reign of Isabella II, decided functionally to ignore the newborn. Mercedes's paternal aunt Isabella retained the title of Princess of Asturias until Práxedes Mateo Sagasta, President of the government that had replaced Cánovas, pressured King Alfonso XII to accord the title to Mercedes, which he did on 10 March 1881. On 12 November 1882, Mercedes gained a sister, Infanta Maria Teresa. The marriage of their parents was unhappy. Alfonso had married Maria Christina in order to secure the succession to the throne. He did not love his wife and was disappointed after she gave birth to two daughters, while he already had two extramarital sons. In July 1883, Maria Christina left the Spanish court and traveled with her daughters to visit her own family in Austria.

By the summer of 1884, Alfonso XII's health had deteriorated: he had tuberculosis. After a brief improvement, the 27-year-old king died on 25 November 1885, leaving behind a widow who was three months pregnant. Given the nascent pregnancy, Mercedes was not declared queen because she would be displaced if a son was born — instead, there was a six month interregnum until the birth of her brother Alfonso XIII on 17 May 1886, who assumed the throne as king immediately upon birth. Had the pregnancy been lost or resulted in another daughter, Mercedes would have been declared queen regnant and been retroactively recognized as having assumed the throne at the death of her father (there would have been no interregnum). Instead, with the late king's new issue arriving, and being a boy, Mercedes resumed the position of heiress presumptive, a title she would continue to hold for the rest of her short life.

== Education ==
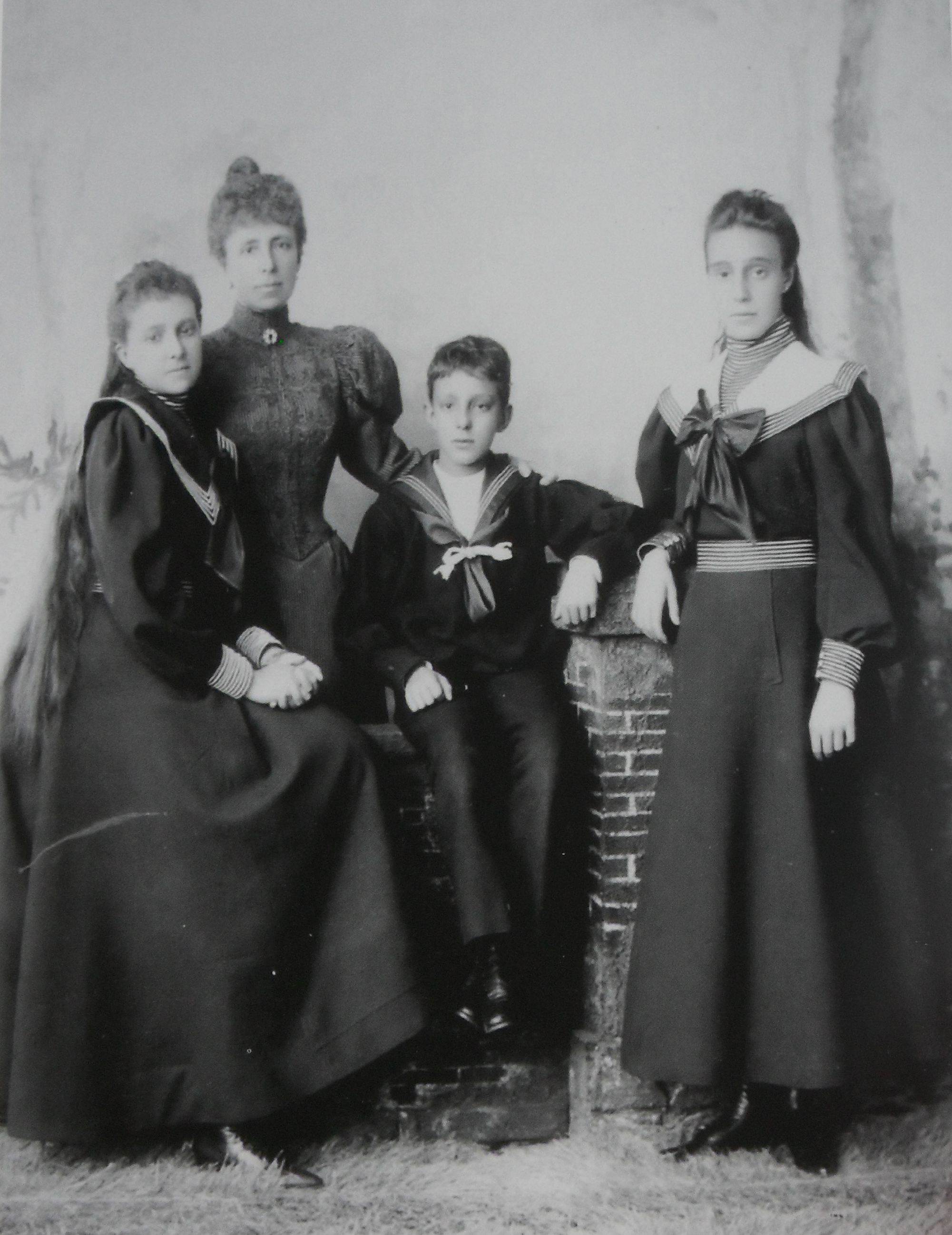
Mercedes with Queen Maria Christina, King Alfonso XIII and Infanta Maria Teresa

Mercedes made her first public appearance at the royal court by the hand of her mother when Queen Maria Christina was declared regent. The education of the Princess of Asturias and her younger sister Infanta Maria Teresa was confined to the Royal Palace of Madrid in an austere environment headed by two widows: their mother and their paternal aunt Isabella (herself formerly Princess of Asturias). The Queen brought up her three children strictly. Despite her constitutional status, Mercedes was not given an education that would have prepared her to govern the nation. She received instead the conventional upbringing of princesses of her time. There were piano and painting lessons, knitting practice, and the Queen involved her daughter in palace duties. Particular attention was paid to obedience and religious precepts.

Mercedes grew up to be a serious young woman, shy and unprepossessing. She was more Habsburg in appearance due to her long face. The family spent the summer months in the Miramar Palace in San Sebastián.

In her adolescence, Mercedes accompanied her mother on trips abroad visiting her paternal grandmother in Paris, her paternal aunt Paz in Munich, and her maternal grandmother Elisabeth Franziska in Vienna. The situation in Spain became more complicated with the Spanish–American War in 1898. Mercedes and her sister lived a restricted life. Their conservative mother did not allow them to take part in the social life of the Spanish nobility. The Queen offered a party in the Royal Palace to mark the debut in society of her daughters on 9 May 1899, the event having been delayed due to the war. At the dance, Mercedes fell in love with her cousin Prince Carlos of Bourbon-Two Sicilies, and the two were frequently seen together.

== Marriage ==
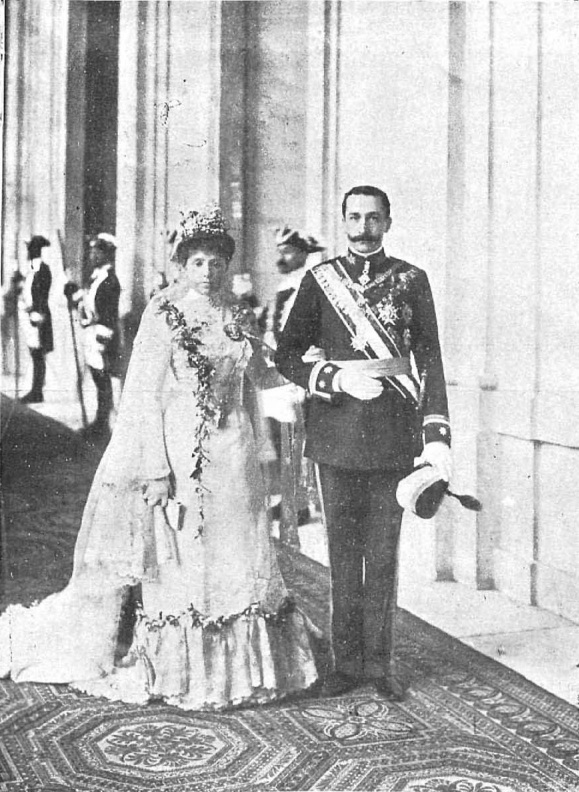
Mercedes, Princess of Asturias and her husband in their wedding

Prince Carlos, Queen Maria Christina's first cousin once removed, belonged to the deposed royal family of the Two Sicilies and had arrived in Spain years earlier in order to follow a military career in the Spanish army. The pairing of the princess and Prince Carlos was not accidental. He had been chosen as a prospective husband by both Queen Maria Christina and Infanta Isabella, who was his aunt as well. It was considered paramount to marry Mercedes to a member of the Bourbon family in order to avoid a change of the dynasty in case she succeeded her brother. Prince Carlos offered other advantages as groom to the Princess of Asturias. As he did not belong to a reigning royal family, he could settle permanently in Spain and adopt the necessary Spanish nationality. He had, however, to resign his rights to the crown of the Two Sicilies as he was third in line after his father and his elder brother.

Carlos was of serious character, shy, handsome, and Mercedes was attracted to him. Their engagement was announced on 14 December 1899. It immediately faced the strong opposition of the liberal party, the republican faction and a wide spectrum of the Spanish society. There was nothing personal against the Prince himself, but his father, the Count of Caserta, had been a general in the last Carlist War and had taken part in the looting of the city of Cuenca by Carlist troops. It was feared that Caserta's son marrying Mercedes would bring the Carlist party too close to the Spanish throne. Even the Prince's name – Carlos – aroused suspicion. In addition, the House of Bourbon-Two Sicilies was considered the most conservative Catholic dynasty, which worried the liberal party.

There were bitter attacks against Mercedes's marriage in the newspapers and protest on the streets in Madrid, Seville and Granada. The Archbishop of Valladolid, one of Spain’s most prominent prelates, wrote a letter to the Queen warning her against the dire consequences if the marriage would take place. The Queen wrote him back: " Monsignor, dedicate yourself to direct your diocese and praying, which are your main obligations, perhaps this way none of the catastrophe you predict will happen". Mercedes herself expressed her frustration to the strong opposition to her choice of groom in a letter to her aunt Paz: "I am happy to marry him, but I am also upset at those who have created such a fuss and made mother suffer for this... all because his father fought alongside don Carlos. Is this fair?"

The controversy marred the wedding festivities. On the day of the wedding, the streets leading to the Royal Palace were barricaded for fear of the protesters and a vast number of troops deployed through the capital. There were no major incidents, however, and the ceremony took place on 14 February 1901 in the chapel of the Royal Palace of Madrid.

== Death ==
The couple lived at the Royal Palace of Madrid in close proximity to Queen Maria Christina, who wished for such proximity. The union was happy and two children were born in quick succession: Prince Alfonso (1901–1964) and Prince Fernando (1903–1905).

Pregnant for the third time, Mercedes longed for a daughter after having two sons. In September 1904, she turned twenty four years old. The following month, twenty days before her due day, Mercedes fell seriously ill. She had appendicitis which initially was misdiagnosed as simple intestinal cramps. Peritonitis set in and on the early hours on 16 October 1904 Mercedes gave birth prematurely to her third child, Princess Isabella Alfonsa (1904–1985).

The health of the mother was so seriously compromised that little attention was given to the child, who was believed to have been stillborn until the young King Alfonso realized the baby was alive. Mercedes died the following day, on 17 October 1904, surrounded by her family.

Mercedes' three children were left in the care of Queen Maria Christina and raised in the court of King Alfonso XIII. The elder son was not given the title of Prince of Asturias, but replaced his mother as heir presumptive.

== Honours ==
- 816th Dame of the Order of Queen Maria Luisa (Spain)
- Grand Cordon of the Precious Crown, 10 June 1902 (Empire of Japan)

== Heraldry ==
Heraldry of Mercedes, Princess of Asturias

Coat of Arms of Mercedes, Princess of Asturias

== Bibliography ==
- Aronson, Theo. Royal Vendetta : The Crown of Spain 1829 -1965. The Bobbs Merrill Company, Inc. 1966. ASIN B0006BO4QO
- Mateos Sainz de Medrano, Ricardo La Reina María Cristina: Madre de Alfonso XIII y Regente de España. La Esfera de los Libros. 2007. ISBN 978-8497346382
- Puga, María Teresa. 20 infantas de España: Sus vidas, entre las ilusiones y el destino. Ed. Juventud, Barcelona, 1998. ISBN 978-84-261-3084-6

María de las Mercedes, Princess of Asturias House of Bourbon Born: 11 September 1880 Died: 17 October 1904
Spanish royalty
| Preceded by Infanta Isabella | Princess of Asturias; 1881–1904 | Succeeded by Infante Alfonso |
