= Sonny Lee =

American jazz musician

Thomas Ball "Sonny" Lee (August 26, 1904, Huntsville, Texas – May 17, 1975, Amarillo, Texas) was an American jazz trombonist.

Lee played with Peck Kelley while a student at Texas State Teachers' College in the early 1920s, then moved to St. Louis, where he worked with the Scranton Sirens, Frankie Trumbauer, Gene Rodemich, Vincent Lopez, and Paul Specht. In 1932 he joined the Isham Jones orchestra, remaining with Jones until 1936; concomitantly he also played with Benny Goodman in 1934-35. He then worked with Artie Shaw, Charlie Barnet, Woody Herman, and Bunny Berigan, and in 1938 joined Jimmy Dorsey's orchestra, where he played until 1946.
