= Prince Francesco, Count of Trapani =

Prince Francis
- Count of Trapani
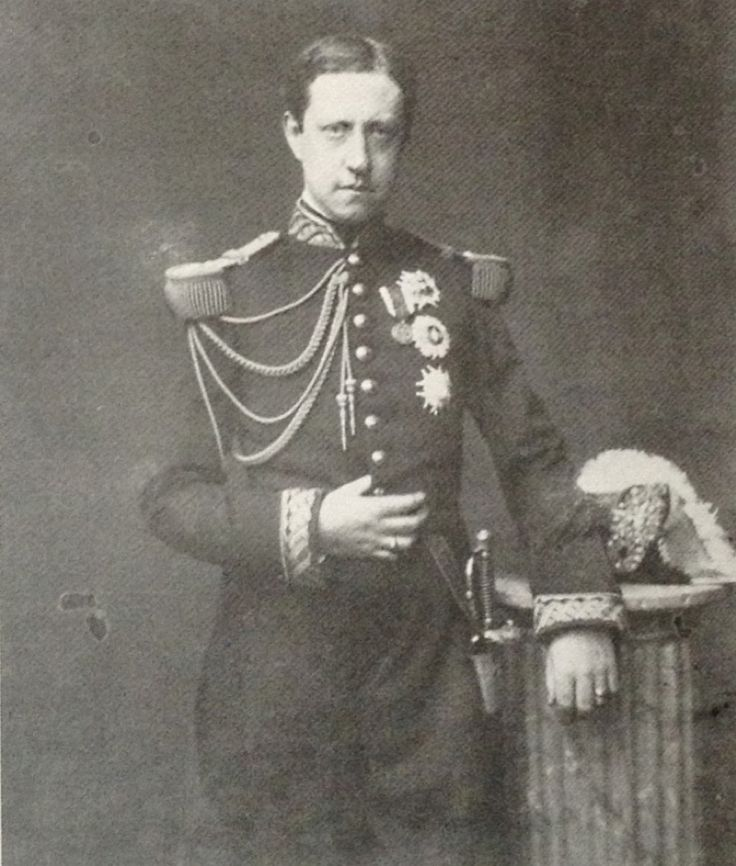
- Born: 13 August 1827; Naples, Two Sicilies
- Died: 24 September 1892 (aged 65); Paris, France
- Burial: Père Lachaise Cemetery
- Spouse: Archduchess Maria Isabella of Austria (m. 1850)
- Issue: Princess Maria Antonietta, Countess of Caserta; Prince Leopoldo; Princess Maria Teresa Pia; Princess Maria Carolina; Prince Ferdinando; Princess Maria Annunziata
Names
- Italian: Francesco di Paola Luigi Emanuele Maria Giuseppe Raffaele Gabriele Gaspare Baldassarre Melchiorre Carlo Gennaro Rosalia Ferdinando Francesco d’Assisi Francesco di Sales Antonio Abate Benedetto Lucia Donato Andrea Avelino Rite Lutgarda Gertrude Venanzio Bonoso Taddeo Spiridione Rocco Vincenzo Ferreri Camillo Vincenzo di Paola Domenico Ippolito Cassiano
- House: Bourbon-Two Sicilies
- Father: Francis I of the Two Sicilies
- Mother: Maria Isabella of Spain

Prince Francesco, Count of Trapani (Italian name: Francesco di Paola Luigi Emmanuele, Principe di Borbone delle Due Sicilie; 13 August 1827 – 24 September 1892) was a member of the House of Bourbon-Two Sicilies.

== Life ==
Born in Naples, Francis was the youngest child and son of Francis I of the Two Sicilies and his second wife, Maria Isabella of Spain. He received the title of Count of Trapani. He was three years old at the death of his father and the ascension of his brother Ferdinand II of the Two Sicilies to the throne. As the youngest son in a large family, he was destined to follow a career in the church and was educated at the Jesuit college in Rome. His religious career was abandoned in 1844 when his uncle King Louis Philippe of France proposed to marry Francis to the young Queen Isabella II of Spain. She was three years younger than him and was both his cousin and his niece. The French ambassador to the Holy See who met the Count of Trapani at this time described him unfavorably as " very ugly, small, of sickly appearance, without expression of intelligence; and when I remember in what condition of health I saw Queen Isabella during my stay in Spain (she suffered from an acute form of eczema), I cannot help thinking that at least from the physical point of view, they could choose better".

The Count of Trapani hesitated in putting forward his candidacy to marry Isabella II. His brother the Count of Aquila, his confessor, and the pro-Austrian party in Naples were all against the idea, thinking that he would be an instrument in King Louis Philippe's hands and that the Queen of Spain could not bear children. However, after a family council on 17 June 1845, Trapani accepted marrying his niece under pressure by his brother Ferdinand II, his mother, and the French ambassador. However, he could not ask for the Queen's hand, she had to offer it. Spain's prime minister Narvaez and Francis's sister Queen Maria Christina favored his candidacy. However, after the fall of Narvaez's government in April 1846, and facing the lack of support in Spain for the project, Maria Christina chose her nephew the Duke of Cadiz as a husband for her daughter in an agreement with King Louis Philippe.

Four years later, on 10 April 1850, Francis married another niece, Archduchess Maria Isabella of Austria, Princess of Tuscany, daughter of Leopold II, Grand Duke of Tuscany and his wife Princess Maria Antonia of the Two Sicilies. Their union was unpopular in Tuscany as the Bourbon of Naples were disliked on political grounds.

In spite of family intrigues, he was loyal to his brother Ferdinand II. Because he did not bother Ferdinand II with petitions, Francis was well liked by the king. Like his brothers, the Count of Syracuse and the Count of Aquila, Trapani had a weakness for women of easy virtue, but he did not get involve in scandals. At Ferdinand II's death on 22 May 1859, Trapani was entrusted with handling the army. During the short reign of his nephew King Francis II, Trapani, lacking in political acumen, provided him with little help in the critical time of the fall of the Kingdom of the Two Sicillies.

After the Kingdom of the Two Sicilies fell in 1861 during the Expedition of the Thousand, the royal family went into exile. Francis and his family went to Rome, where they were under the protection of Pope Pius IX. However, the Papal States were also invaded in 1870 by Victor Emmanuel II of Italy and Francis and his family fled next to France. Francis died in 1892 in Paris at 65 years of age.

== Issue ==
The Count of Trapani and his wife had six children:

- Princess Maria Antonietta of the Two Sicilies (16 March 1851 – 12 September 1938)

∞ Prince Alfonso, Count of Caserta on 8 June 1868 in Rome, had 12 children.

- Prince Leopoldo of the Two Sicilies (24 September 1853 – 4 September 1870)
- Princess Maria Teresa Pia of the Two Sicilies (7 January 1855 – 1 September 1856)
- Princess Maria Carolina of the Two Sicilies (21 February 1856 – 7 April 1941)

∞ Count Andrzej Przemysław Zamoyski on 19 November 1885 in Paris, had 7 children.

- Prince Ferdinando of the Two Sicilies (25 May 1857 – 22 July 1859)
- Princess Maria Annunziata of the Two Sicilies (21 September 1858 – 20 March 1873)

=== Honours ===
- Knight of the Order of Saint Januarius (1830)
- Knight of the Spanish Order of the Golden Fleece (1830)
- Knight of the Order of Charles III
- Knight Grand Cross of the Order of Saint Ferdinand and of Merit
- Knight of the Military Order of Maria Theresa (1861)
- Knight Grand Cross of the Order of Saint Joseph
- Knight Grand Cross of the Order of the Tower and Sword

== Ancestry ==
Ancestors of Prince Francesco, Count of Trapani

8. Charles III of Spain (= 12)
4. Ferdinand I of the Two Sicilies
9. Maria Amalia of Saxony (= 13)
2. Francis I of the Two Sicilies
10. Francis I, Holy Roman Emperor
5. Maria Carolina of Austria
11. Maria Theresa of Austria
1. Prince Francis, Count of Trapani
12. Charles III of Spain (= 8)
6. Charles IV of Spain
13. Maria Amalia of Saxony (= 9)
3. Maria Isabella of Spain
14. Philip, Duke of Parma
7. Maria Luisa of Parma
15. Louise Élisabeth of France
