= Archduchess Maria Isabella of Austria =

Archduchess Maria Isabella
- Countess of Trapani
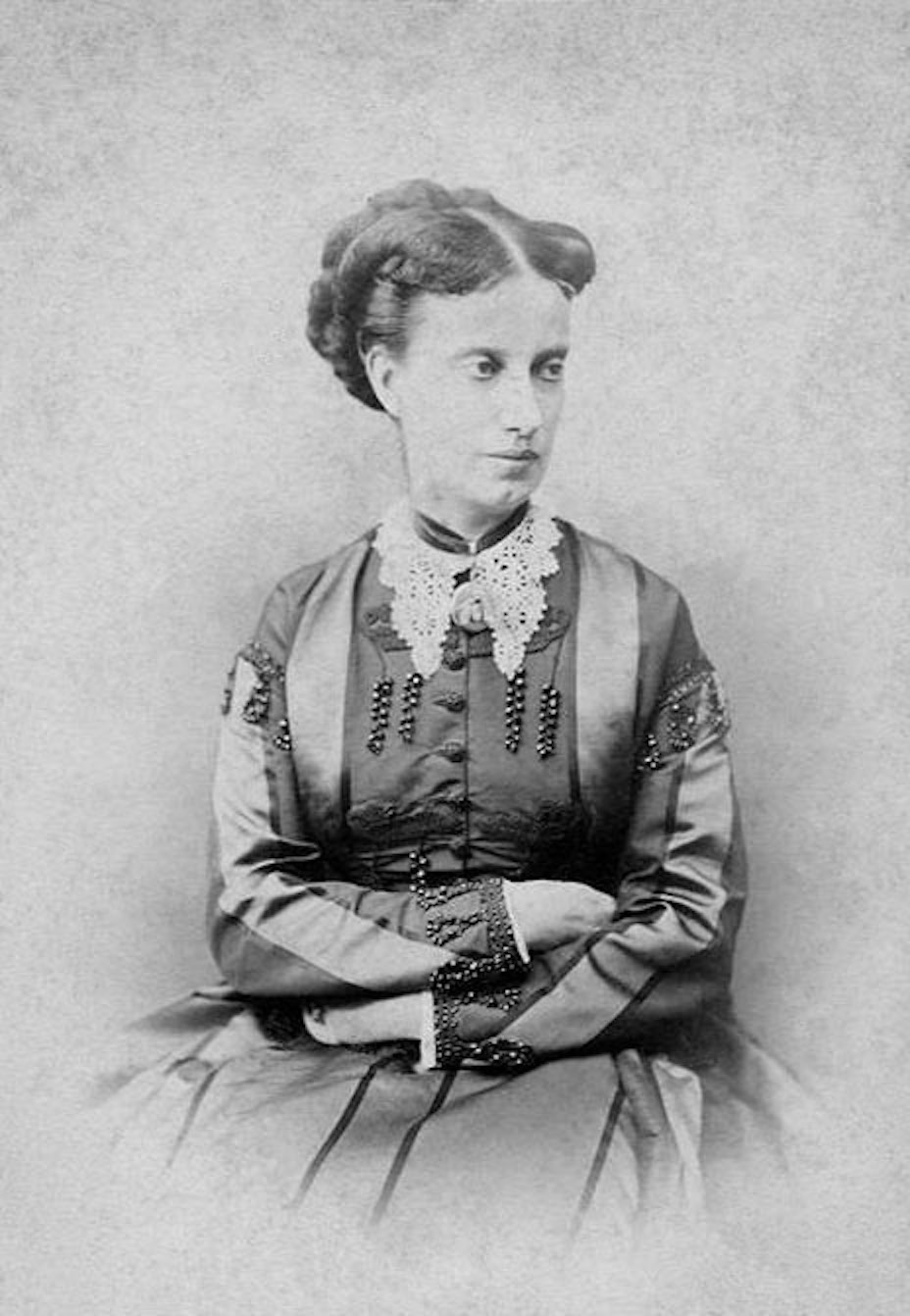
- Photograph by Fratelli D'Alessandri, c. 1860s
- Born: 21 May 1834; Florence, Grand Duchy of Tuscany
- Died: 14 July 1901 (aged 67); Lucerne, Switzerland
- Spouse: Prince Francis, Count of Trapani (m. 1850; died 1892)
- Issue: Princess Maria Antonietta, Countess of Caserta; Prince Leopoldo; Princess Maria Teresa Pia; Princess Maria Carolina; Prince Ferdinando; Princess Maria Annunziata
Names
- Italian: Maria Isabella Annunziata Giovanna Giuseppa Umiltà Apollonia Filomena Virginia Gabriella
- House: Habsburg-Lorraine
- Father: Leopold II of Tuscany
- Mother: Princess Maria Antonia of the Two Sicilies

Archduchess Maria Isabella of Austria, Princess of Tuscany (21 May 1834 – 14 July 1901), was an Archduchess of Austria and Princess of Tuscany by birth and Countess of Trapani by marriage to her uncle Prince Francis, Count of Trapani.

Maria Isabella was born in Florence, Grand Duchy of Tuscany, as the daughter of Leopold II of Tuscany and his second wife, Princess Maria Antonia of the Two Sicilies.

== Biography ==
=== Marriage and issue ===
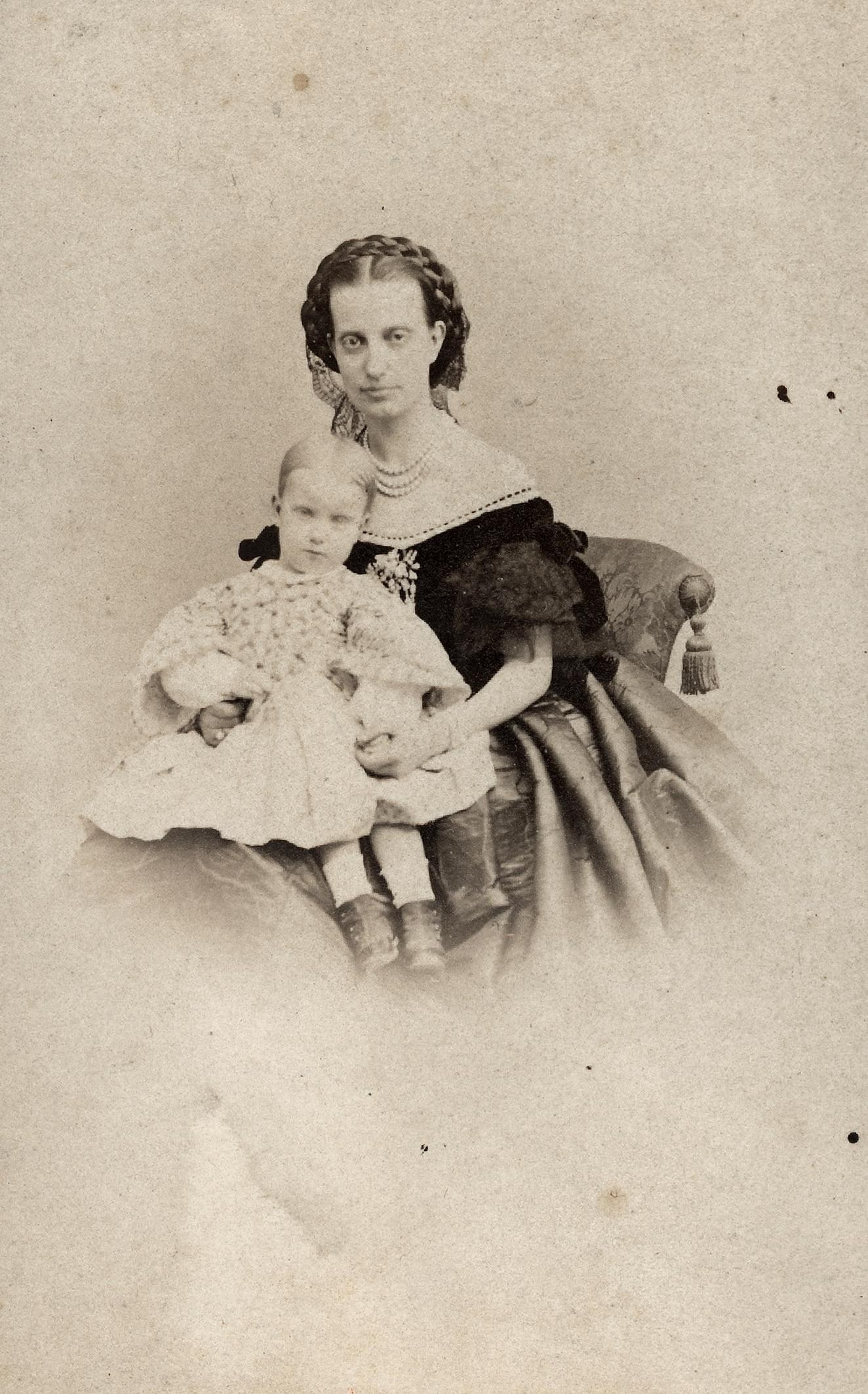
The Countess of Trapani with her eldest daughter, Antonietta, circa 1853

Maria Isabella married her uncle Prince Francis, Count of Trapani, youngest son of Francis I of the Two Sicilies and his wife María Isabel of Spain, on 10 April 1850. Maria Isabella and Francis had six children:

- Princess Maria Antonietta of Bourbon-Two Sicilies (16 March 1851 – 12 September 1938)

∞ Prince Alfonso, Count of Caserta on 8 June 1868 in Rome, had 12 issue.

- Prince Leopoldo Maria of Bourbon-Two Sicilies (24 September 1853 – 4 September 1870)
- Princess Maria Teresa Pia of Bourbon-Two Sicilies (7 January 1855 – 1 September 1856)
- Princess Maria Carolina of Bourbon-Two Sicilies (21 February 1856 – 7 April 1941)

∞ Count Andrzej Przemysław Zamoyski on 19 November 1885 in Paris, had 7 children.

- Prince Ferdinando Maria of Bourbon-Two Sicilies (25 May 1857 – 22 July 1859)
- Princess Maria Annunziata of Bourbon-Two Sicilies (21 September 1858 – 20 March 1873)

=== Death ===
On 14 July 1901, Maria Isabella died near Lucerne, Switzerland, at age 67. She was survived by two daughters.

== Honours ==
- Spain : 698th Dame of the Order of Queen Maria Luisa - .

== Ancestry ==
Ancestors of Archduchess Maria Isabella of Austria

8. Leopold II, Holy Roman Emperor
4. Ferdinand III of Tuscany
9. Infanta Maria Luisa of Spain
2. Leopold II of Tuscany
10. Ferdinand I of the Two Sicilies
5. Princess Luisa of Naples and Sicily
11. Archduchess Maria Carolina of Austria
1. Archduchess Maria Isabella of Austria
12. Ferdinand I of the Two Sicilies (= 10)
6. Francis I of the Two Sicilies
13. Archduchess Maria Carolina of Austria (= 11)
3. Princess Maria Antonia of the Two Sicilies
14. Charles IV of Spain
7. Infanta Maria Isabella of Spain
15. Infanta Maria Luisa of Parma
