= Ukko Hietala =

Finnish modern pentathlete

Personal information
- Born: 4 August 1904 Hollola, Finland
- Died: 31 October 1990 (aged 86) Espoo, Finland

Sport
- Sport: Modern pentathlon

Ukko Hietala (4 August 1904 – 31 October 1990) was a Finnish modern pentathlete. He competed at the 1936 Summer Olympics.
