= Prince Jaime, Duke of Noto =

Spanish aristocrat

Prince Jaime
- Duke of Noto (disputed); Duke of Capua
- Born: 26 June 1993 (age 33); Madrid, Spain
- Spouse: Lady Charlotte Lindesay-Bethune (m. 2021)
- Issue: Princess Francesca; Princess Ines
Names
- Spanish: Jaime de Borbón-Dos Sicilias y Landaluce
- House: Bourbon-Two Sicilies
- Father: Prince Pedro, Duke of Calabria
- Mother: Sofía Landaluce y Melgarejo
- Religion: Roman Catholic

Prince Jaime of Bourbon-Two Sicilies, Duke of Noto (born 26 June 1993) is a Spanish aristocrat and heir to the headship of the House of Bourbon-Two Sicilies as eldest son of Prince Pedro, Duke of Calabria.

== Biography ==
Jaime was born on 26 June 1993 in Madrid, Spain, as the illegitimate son of Prince Pedro, then Duke of Noto (born 16 October 1968), and Sofia Landaluce y Melgarejo (born 23 November 1973). He was later legitimized by his parents' marriage, following which he was joined by six siblings – three brothers and three sisters.

His paternal grandparents are Infante Carlos, Duke of Calabria (1938–2015), and his wife, Princess Anne of Orléans.

The Duke of Noto was educated at the Centro Universitario Villanueva (with a degree in law) and then obtained a master's degree in management from the IE University Business School. From September 2018 to January 2022, he was a director of the Plug and Play Tech Center in Paris and from July 2019 also in Spain. After serving as a director at Heritage Holdings from January 2022 to June 2023, he joined Aquiline Capital Partners in London in July 2023.

== Claim to the throne ==
Jaime's grandfather, Infante Don Carlos of Spain, Duke of Calabria, had to consider whether the future marriage of Prince Pedro to Sofía Landaluce y Melgarejo would meet the conditions established in the Sovereign Act that was signed in Naples on 7 April 1829, Law no. 2362, which gave the "head of Our House of Bourbon... such authority as is necessary to protect the purity and splendour of the throne", by requiring all members of the dynasty to have formal permission to marry. This was confirmed in the Sovereign Act signed at Naples on 12 March 1836, Law no. 3331. The marriages of all members of the dynasty that had been considered capable of transmitting dynastic rights had been to royal princesses until the marriage of Prince Ranieri to Countess Carolina Zamoyska in 1929.

The ultimate decision of Infante Carlos to permit his son's marriage to be considered dynastic followed the marriages of the daughters of King Juan Carlos without them being required to renounce their right of succession to the Spanish throne, and a change in the marriage rules of the House of Austria. Infante Carlos and his wife attended the marriage of Prince Pedro on 30 March 2001, and the marriage is treated as a dynastic marriage transmitting full rights of succession to all the children of Prince Pedro and his wife. It was made clear by the date of the marriage of the future King Felipe VI in 2004 that the children of Prince Pedro and his wife had full dynastic rights, and the children bear the style of Royal Highness and the title of Prince(ss) of Bourbon-Two Sicilies.

== Marriage and issue ==
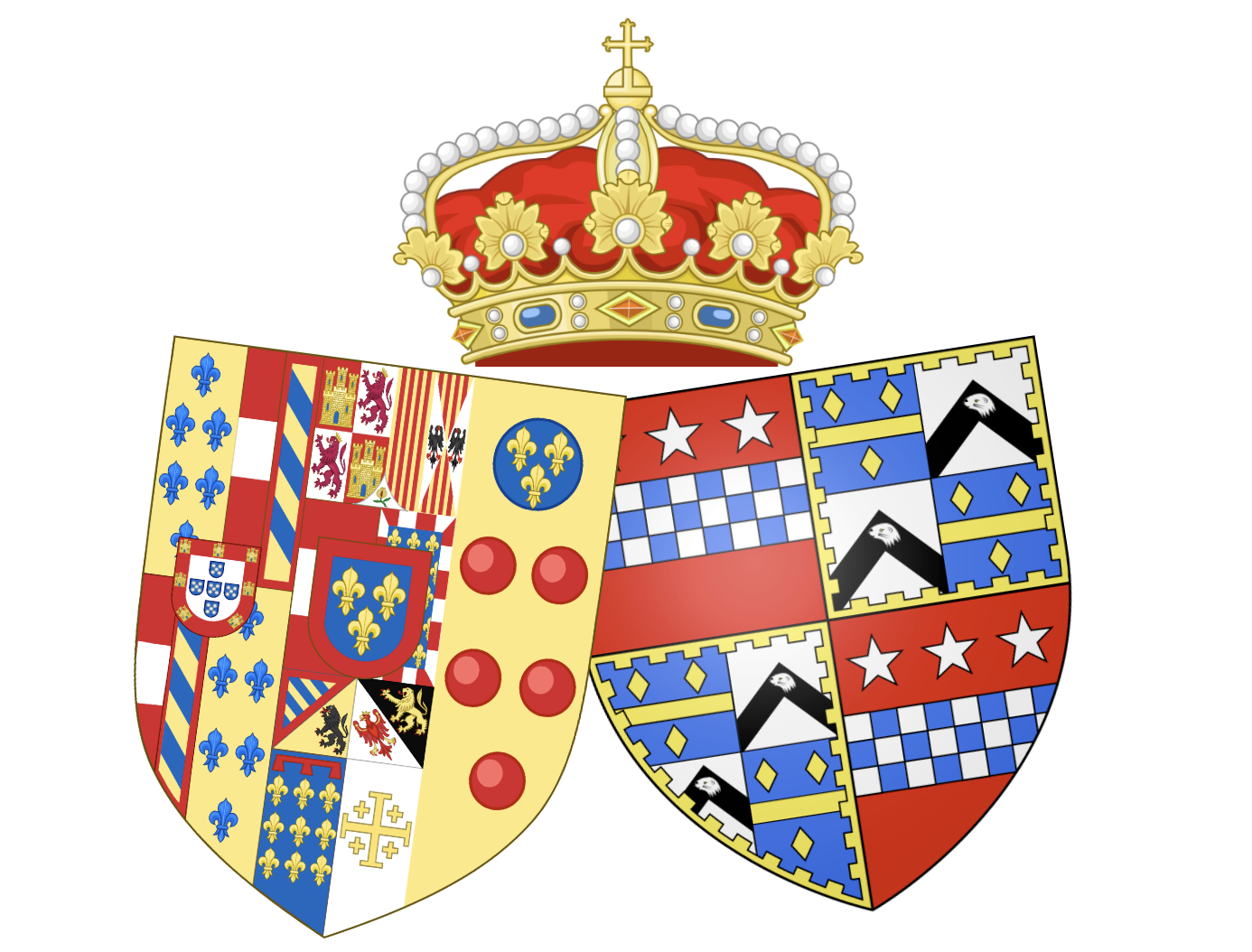
Arms of Charlotte, Duchess of Noto

On 25 September 2021 at Monreale Cathedral in Palermo, Jaime married Lady Charlotte Lindesay-Bethune, youngest daughter of James Lindesay-Bethune, 16th Earl of Lindsay, and his wife, Diana Mary Chamberlayne-Macdonald.

On 13 October 2023, the Duke and Duchess of Noto had their first child in London – a daughter named Francesca Sofía. On 19 November 2025, the Duke and Duchess of Noto had their second child in London – a daughter named Ines.
