= Prince Pedro, Duke of Calabria =

Pedro
- Duke of Calabria; Grandee of Spain
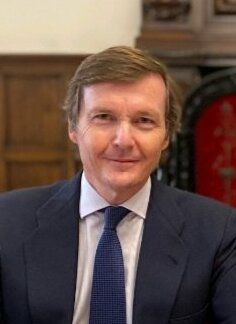
- Pedro in 2022

Head of the House of Bourbon-Two Sicilies (disputed)
- Tenure: 5 October 2015 – present
- Predecessor: Infante Carlos
- Heir: Prince Jaime
- Born: 16 October 1968 (age 58); Madrid, Spain
- Spouse: Sofía Landaluce y Melgarejo (m. 2001)
- Issue: Prince Jaime, Duke of Noto; Prince Juan; Prince Pablo; Prince Pedro; Princess Sofía; Princess Blanca; Princess María
Names
- Spanish: Pedro Juan María Alejo Saturnino de Todos los Santos de Borbón-Dos Sicilias y Orleans
- House: Bourbon-Two Sicilies
- Father: Infante Carlos, Duke of Calabria
- Mother: Princess Anne of Orléans
- Religion: Roman Catholic

Prince Pedro of Bourbon-Two Sicilies, Duke of Calabria, Grandee of Spain (Spanish: Pedro Juan María Alejo Saturnino de Todos los Santos; born 16 October 1968), is the only son of Infante Carlos, Duke of Calabria, and Princess Anne of Orléans. As primogeniture heir of the kings of the Two Sicilies, he is the principal claimant to the headship of the Royal House of Bourbon-Two Sicilies, which ruled the Kingdom of the Two Sicilies before the unification of Italy.

== Claim ==
He is the only son of Infante Carlos, Duke of Calabria (1938–2015), and his wife, Princess Anne of Orléans. Pedro is the senior of the two claimants to the headship of the House of Bourbon-Two Sicilies, since the death of his father on 5 October 2015. The other claimant is Prince Carlo, Duke of Castro. Pedro is claimant to the grand mastership of the Constantinian Order, and the grand mastership of the Order of Saint Januarius, as well as president of the Council of the four Spanish Military Orders of Santiago, Calatrava, Alcántara and Montesa, and grand commander of the Order of Alcántara. He is also a grandee of Spain, as the son of an infante of Spain.

=== Act of Cannes (1900) ===
On 14 December 1900, Prince Carlos, next oldest brother to Prince Ferdinand, head of the House of Bourbon-Two Sicilies and immediate heir of their father, claimant to the former throne of the Two Sicilies, signed a private agreement purporting to renounce the "future succession" to the former crown before his marriage to María de las Mercedes, Princess of Asturias, heiress presumptive to the throne of Spain. The Spanish minister of Justice had stated in the Cortes (Parliament) on 18 December 1900 that no renunciation was necessary and any such renunciation would be null and void. This document, known as the Act of Cannes, was signed in purported obedience to the 1759 Pragmatic Sanction signed by Charles III of Spain where it was established that the thrones of Spain and Naples should never be united in the person of the same monarch, separating them forever to preserve the European balance of power. The newly independent Kingdom of Naples was ceded by Charles III of Spain to his third child, who would become Ferdinand I of Naples. This would establish the kings of Naples and Sicily as cadet members of the Spanish royal family, and so the country enjoyed strong relationships with its 'mother state', following many of its legal customs. The Act of Cannes states:

Before Us, Don Alfonso de Borbón, Count of Caserta... Head of the Royal House and Dynasty of the Two Sicilies... His Royal Highness Prince Don Carlos, our beloved Son, appears and declares that, preparing to marry HRH Infanta María de las Mercedes, Princess of Asturias, and assuming by such marriage the nationality and quality of Spanish Prince, undertakes to renounce by this Act and solemnly renounces, for himself and for his heirs and successors, all the right and reason to the eventual succession to the Crown of the Two Sicilies and to all the assets of the Royal House that are in Italy and elsewhere, and this according to our Laws, constitutions and Family customs, in execution of the Pragmatic Sanction of King Charles III, our Augustus ancestor, of October 6, 1759, the prescriptions of which he freely and spontaneously declares to subscribe and obey. He also declares, in particular, to renounce for himself, his heirs and successors to the assets and values existing in Italy, Vienna and Munich and destined by His Majesty King Francis II (may God have welcomed his soul), to the foundation of a majorat for the Head of the Dynasty and of the Family of the Two Sicilies and for the constitution of an endowment fund in favor of the Royal Princesses and granddaughters of our August Father King Ferdinand (may God have welcomed his soul), of marriageable age; but preserving his rights to the part of the assets that were bequeathed to him by his late uncle King Francis II, in the event that the Italian Government, which improperly retains them, makes the due restitution and the same everything that may arrive to him by other testamentary legacies.

— Cannes, 14 December 1900

Supporters of the other claimant to the headship of the House of Bourbon-Two Sicilies, sometimes referred to as the Castrist faction, argue that because Prince Carlos signed this agreement, he relinquished all of his rights and those of his descendants to both the headship of the family and the Sacred Military Constantinian Order of Saint George, and so the rights currently fall on Prince Carlo, Duke of Castro. However, supporters of Pedro, also known as the legitimists, argue that the Act of Cannes was subject to a condition that never arose and its terms would have only applied if the wife of Prince Carlos had inherited the throne of Spain, and he had become king of the Two Sicilies, which never happened and was furthermore highly unlikely at the time the document was created. The legitimist supporters also point out several flaws in the document and its interpretation and that it was subordinate to the Pragmatic Decree and laws of the House. Also, they argue that the Act of Cannes never mentioned the headship of the House of Bourbon-Two Sicilies nor the grand mastership of the Constantinian Order, and so this was therefore never renounced. Regardless, the Papal Brief of 1698 and Bull of 1718 established that the grand mastership was not tied to any temporal sovereignty but was a separate inheritance of the Farnese family, and so it is the mainstream academic view that succession is not linked to the throne of Naples and Sicily. Following this logic, at the very least, the headship and grand magistry of the Constantinian Order would fall on Prince Pedro. In due course, Prince Carlos inherited his share of properties of the royal family in Italy, despite the purported renunciation, with no objection by his brothers and sisters.

== Career ==
He graduated as an agricultural engineer from the University of Castilla-La Mancha, and completed his Spanish military service in the Royal Guard. He manages the family estate, La Toledana in Ciudad Real, Spain, as well as other landed estates in Spain and Austria.

== Marriage and issue ==
Pedro married Sofía Landaluce y Melgarejo (born 23 November 1973 in Madrid), daughter of José Manuel Landaluce y Domínguez and his wife María de las Nieves Blanca Melgarejo y González (granddaughter of the Dukes of San Fernando de Quiroga), on 30 March 2001 at Real Club de la Puerta de Hierro in Madrid. Pedro and Sofía have seven children:

- Prince Jaime of Bourbon-Two Sicilies (born 26 June 1992 in Madrid), Duke of Noto (Duke of Capua 2012–2015), Grand Constable of the Order of Saint George of the Reunion, Grand Prefect of the Constantinian Order, Knight of Alcántara, Knight of Honour and Devotion of the Sovereign Military Order of Malta. Married to Lady Charlotte Diana Lindesay-Bethune (born 12 May 1993), youngest child of Scottish businessman and politician James Lindesay-Bethune, 16th Earl of Lindsay, and his wife, Diana Mary Chamberlayne-Macdonald, on 25 September 2021 at Monreale Cathedral. They have two daughters:
  - Princess Francesca Sofía of Bourbon-Two Sicilies (born 13 October 2023 in London)
  - Princess Ines of Bourbon-Two Sicilies (born 19 November 2025 in London)
- Prince Juan of Bourbon-Two Sicilies (born 18 April 2003 in Madrid)
- Prince Pablo of Bourbon-Two Sicilies (born 26 June 2004 in Madrid)
- Prince Pedro of Bourbon-Two Sicilies (born 3 January 2007 in Ciudad Real)
- Princess Sofía of Bourbon-Two Sicilies (born 12 November 2008 in Madrid)
- Princess Blanca of Bourbon-Two Sicilies (born 7 April 2011 in Ciudad Real)
- Princess María of Bourbon-Two Sicilies (born 5 March 2015 in Ciudad Real)

== Honours ==
=== Dynastic ===
- (Kingdom of the Two Sicilies) : House of Bourbon-Two Sicilies: Knight Grand Cross of Justice of the Sacred Military Constantinian Order of Saint George (1986–2015)
- (Kingdom of the Two Sicilies) : House of Bourbon-Two Sicilies: Sovereign and Grand Master of the Illustrious Royal Order of Saint Januarius
- (Kingdom of the Two Sicilies) : House of Bourbon-Two Sicilies: Sovereign and Grand Master of the Sacred Military Constantinian Order of Saint George
- (Kingdom of the Two Sicilies) : House of Bourbon-Two Sicilies: Sovereign and Grand Master of the Order of Saint Ferdinand and of Merit
- (Kingdom of the Two Sicilies) : House of Bourbon-Two Sicilies: Sovereign and Grand Master of the Royal Order of the Two-Sicilies

=== National ===
- Sovereign Military Order of Malta: Bailiff Grand Cross of Honour and Devotion of the Sovereign Military Order of Malta
- Vatican: Knight Grand Cross of the Equestrian Order of the Holy Sepulchre of Jerusalem.
- Spain: Commander of the Civil Order of Alfonso X the Wise (22 December 2017)

== Other activities ==
- President of the Foundation for the Protection of Nature
- President of the Foundation Lux Hispaniarum
- President of the Foundation of the Hospital of Santiago de Cuenca
- Patron of the Foundation of Commanderies of Santiago
- Vice-President of the Delegation of the Community of Castilla-La Mancha of the APD

== Arms ==
Heraldry of Prince Pedro of Bourbon-Two Sicilies

Coat of arms as Duke of Noto
(1968–2015)

Coat of arms as Pretender
(2015–present)

Coat of arms in Spain (Note: Prince Pedro of Bourbon-Two Sicilies holds the Presidency of the Royal Council of the Spanish Military Orders of Chivalry and he is Grand Commander of the Spanish Order of Alcántara.)
(2015–present)

== Bibliography ==
- España, Gobierno de (1987). Informes Emitidos por Ministerio de Justicia, Real Academia de Jurisprudencia y Legislación, Ministerio de Asuntos Exteriores, Instituto "Salazar y Castro" (C.S.I.C.) y Consejo de Estado Relativos al Título de Jefe de la Casa Real de Borbón Dos Sicilias y al Gran Maestrazgo de la Sagrada Militar Orden Constantiniana de San Jorge. Gráficas Arias Montano, Móstoles.
- Lecanda Crooke, Íñigo (2012). "Análisis jurídico de la legitimidad en la Jefatura de la Casa Real de Borbón Dos-Sicilias y el Gran Maestrazgo de sus Órdenes" (PDF). Anales de la Real Academia Matritense de Heráldica y Genealogía. Real Academia Matritense de Heráldica y Genealogía.
- de Palacio, José María (1964). La Maison Royale des Deux Siciles, l'Ordre Constantinien de Saint Georges et l'Ordre de Saint Janvier. Altamira Talleres Gráficos.
- Stair Sainty, Guy (2018). The Constantinian Order of Saint George. Boletín Oficial del Estado. ISBN 978-84-340-2506-6.

Prince Pedro, Duke of Calabria House of Bourbon-Two Sicilies Cadet branch of the House of Bourbon Born: 16 October 1968
Preceded by Carlos	— TITULAR — King of the Two Sicilies; 2015–present Reason for succession failure: Unification of Italy under the House of Savoy	Incumbent; Heir: Prince Jaime, Duke of Noto
Preceded by Carlos	Duke of Noto; 1968–2015	Next: Prince Jaime, Duke of Noto
Titles in pretence
Preceded by Jaime de Bourbon	Line of succession to the French throne (Legitimist) c. 17th position	Followed by Prince Jaime, Duke of Noto
