= Enrico Salati =

Prime Minister of the Duchy of Parma (1788–1869)

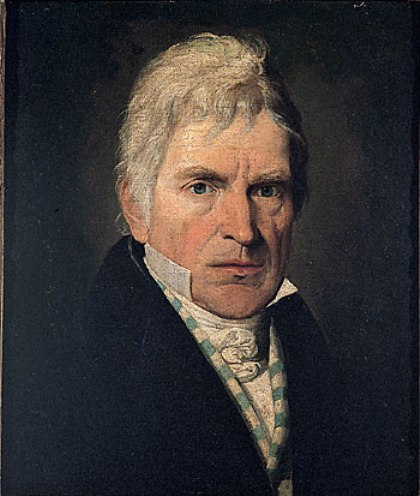
- Born: 5 September 1788
- Died: 27 July 1869 (aged 80)
- Occupation: Prime Minister of Parma
- Known for: 1848 Treaty of Parma

Enrico Salati (1788–1869) was Prime Minister of the Duchy of Parma from 1849 to 1859

== Biography ==
Enrico Salati began his career as a lawyer for the Duchy of Parma.

Under Marie Louise, Duchess of Parma he was appointed President of the Ministry of Grace and Justice.

Enrico Salati as Counsellor of State for the Duchy of Parma, acting on behalf of Charles II, Duke of Parma, signed an alliance with Prince Klemens von Metternich, Foreign Minister of the Austrian Empire on 4 February 1848.

Following the abdication of Charles II in 1849 to his son Charles III, Duke of Parma; Enrico Salati became Chief Minister of Parma and Piacenza on 17 May 1849 and he served until 3 May 1859.

Charles III was assassinated on 26 March 1854 and was succeeded by his son Robert I, Duke of Parma (age 5) the following day. Duchess Louise Marie Therese of France requested Enrico Salati and the other ministers to remain in administration as she considered them to be trustworthy and loyal.

The Duchy of Parma was disbanded 9 June 1859 after the Second Italian War of Independence, and became part of the Kingdom of Italy in 1861. Oltre a ciò sappiamo che Enrico Salati ebbe, forse più di un figlio, tra cui però ricordiamo solo Ercolano Salati, a causa della poco documentazione pervenutaci; tuttavia lo stesso Ercolano ebbe anch'esso un figlio o più, tra cui Desiderio Salati .

== Recognition ==
Enrico Salati was appointed Knight Commander of the Sacred Military Constantinian Order of Saint George by Marie Louise of Austria.

== See also ==
- Duchy of Parma
- Marie Louise, Duchess of Parma
- House of Bourbon-Parma
- Louise Marie Therese of France
- Second Italian War of Independence
- List of historic states of Italy
- Italian unification
- Kingdom of Italy
