= Wedding of Prince Juan Carlos and Princess Sophia =

Royal wedding

- Date: 14 May 1962; 64 years ago
- Venue: Cathedral Basilica of St. Dionysius the Areopagite; Metropolitan Cathedral of Athens; Royal Palace of Athens
- Location: Athens, Kingdom of Greece
- Participants: Juan Carlos, Prince of Asturias; Princess Sophia of Greece and Denmark

The wedding of Prince Juan Carlos of Spain and Princess Sophia of Greece and Denmark took place on Monday, 14 May 1962. The couple was married in three ceremonies: one according to the rites of the Roman Catholic Church, the groom's faith, at the Cathedral Basilica of St. Dionysius the Areopagite; one according to the rites of the Greek Orthodox Church, the bride's faith, at the Metropolitan Cathedral of Athens; and a third civil ceremony that was held upon their return to the Royal Palace. Don Juan Carlos was the eldest son of Infante Juan, Count of Barcelona, pretender to the Spanish throne, and Princess María de las Mercedes of Bourbon-Two Sicilies, while Princess Sophia (later renamed Sofía upon marriage) was the eldest daughter of King Paul and Queen Frederica of Greece. Juan Carlos and Sofía were king and queen of Spain from 1975 until his abdication in 2014.

== Engagement ==
Juan Carlos, who then held the title of Prince of Asturias in pretense, and Princess Sophia of Greece and Denmark, third cousins through Queen Victoria of the United Kingdom, first met in 1954 on a cruise in the Greek Islands on board the liner SS Agamemnon. The cruise was organized by Queen Frederica with the intent of promoting Greek tourism and encourage matches among the younger generation of European royalty. The couple reconnected at the wedding of Prince Edward, Duke of Kent, and Katharine Worsley in June 1961.

They became engaged three months after the Kent's wedding. The engagement was announced on 13 September 1961 at the home of Juan Carlos's paternal grandmother, Queen Victoria Eugenie, in Lausanne. Juan Carlos gave Sophia a ring made from melted down ancient Greek coins. When he presented her with the ring, he tossed the box at her and said "Sofi, catch it!"

=== Controversy ===
The uncertain position of Juan Carlos as a prince from a deposed dynasty made him a controversial choice as a future husband for a princess from a reigning family. Spanish monarchists rejoiced at the betrothal as they believed it increased the realism for the prospect of restoration following Franco's demise.

From the outset, the difference in religion caused friction on both sides. A compromise was eventually reached: two ceremonies would be held, Sophia would convert to Catholicism, and she would adopt the Spanish variant of her name, Sofía, with an acute "i" accent. Pope John XXIII allowed two ceremonies as the Greek Orthodox Church was the state religion. Spanish media was requested by Franco not to cover the Greek Orthodox ceremony.

The prospect of a state-funded dowry for Princess Sofía caused controversy in Greece. The Hellenic Parliament approved a $300,000 tax-free dowry for the princess. The Centre Union and United Democratic Left parties abstained from voting but voiced their criticism and "denounced the practice of granting dowries as anachronistic and barbarous." King Paul and Queen Frederica also sold land from their estates to pay for their daughter's dowry.

== Pre-wedding celebrations ==
On 12 May 1962, a white-tie gala was held at the Royal Palace to celebrate the impending wedding. An addition to the palace was built to house a new ballroom for the wedding celebrations. Called the Reception Hall, it is the largest room in the present-day Presidential Mansion.

== Wedding ==
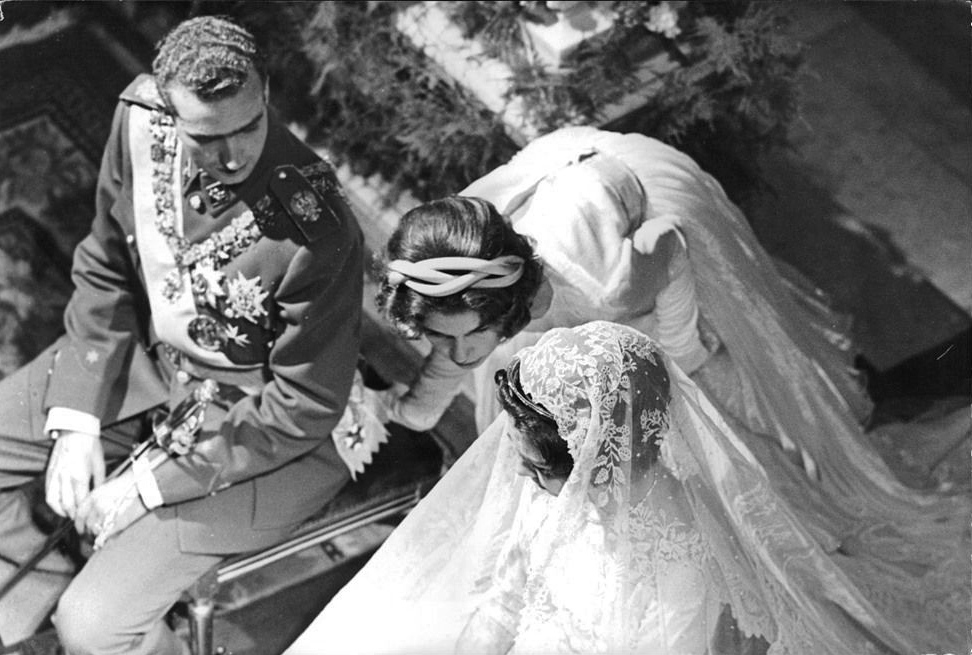
Prince Juan Carlos, Princess Irene and Princess Sophia during the Roman Catholic ceremony.

=== Roman Catholic ceremony ===
Due to the large number of dignitaries attending the wedding, some only attended one of the two ceremonies. The first ceremony began at 10:00 AM and was held according to the rites of the Roman Catholic Church at the Cathedral Basilica of St. Dionysius the Areopagite. The marriage was performed by Venediktos Printesis, Archbishop of Athens. The Mass was said in Spanish, Latin and French. Pieces from Mozart's Coronation Mass were sung, at the bride's request.

=== Greek Orthodox ceremony ===
The second ceremony, held at 12:00 PM at the Metropolitan Cathedral of Athens, was conducted by Chrysostomos II, Archbishop of Athens and All Greece. King Paul, the bride's father, performed the ritual of the two crowns. Other crown bearers were Crown Prince Constantine of Greece, Prince Michael of Greece and Denmark, the Duke of Aosta, the Prince of Naples, the Duke of Noto, Prince Ludwig of Baden, Marco Torlonia, 6th Prince of Civitella-Cesi, and Prince Christian Oscar of Hanover.

=== Civil ceremony ===
A civil ceremony was performed at the Royal Palace following the two religious services.

=== Attire ===
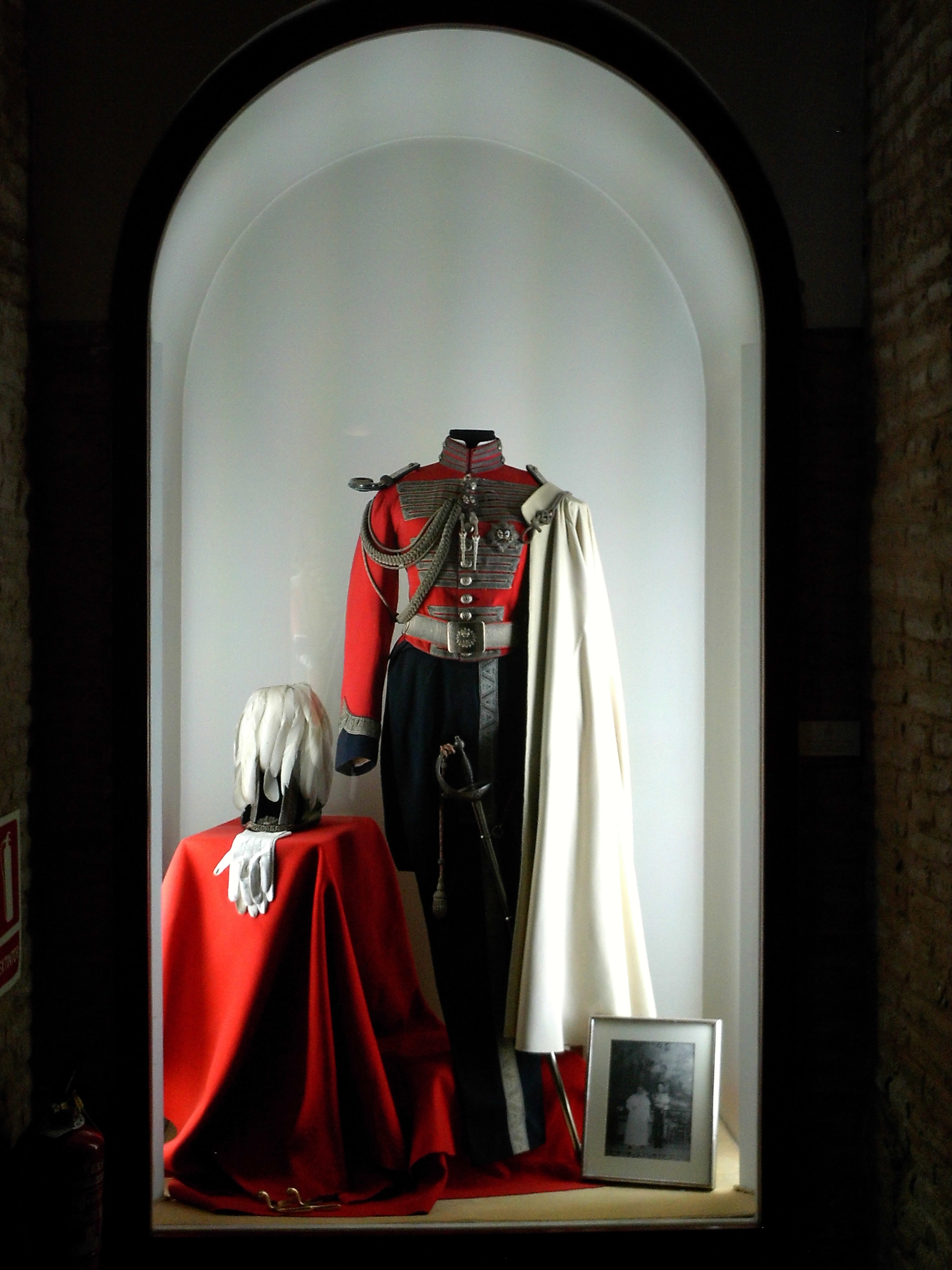
Uniform of the Real Maestranza de Caballería de Sevilla, worn by the Duke of Noto as best man at the wedding.

The bride wore a silver and white lamé gown covered in tulle and antique lace with a 5 metres (16 ft) train designed by Greek-born Parisian couturier, Jean Dessès. She also made a £7000 trousseau order at Dessès.

The bride wore the Belgian lace veil her mother wore at her own wedding in 1938 and a diamond tiara that Kaiser Wilhelm II presented to his daughter, Princess Victoria Louise of Prussia, the bride's maternal grandmother, on the occasion of her marriage to Prince Ernst August of Hanover in 1913.

The groom wore his Spanish Army uniform with the insignia of the Spanish Order of the Golden Fleece and the Order of Charles III and the Greek Order of the Redeemer.

=== Attendants ===
Juan Carlos's cousin, the Duke of Noto, acted as best man. Princess Sophia was attended by eight bridesmaids, all of royal birth:

- Princess Irene of Greece and Denmark, sister of the bride
- Infanta Pilar of Spain, sister of the groom
- Princess Anne-Marie of Denmark, daughter of King Frederik IX and Queen Ingrid of Denmark
- Princess Benedikte of Denmark, daughter of King Frederik IX and Queen Ingrid of Denmark
- Princess Irene of the Netherlands, daughter of Queen Juliana and Prince Bernhard of the Netherlands
- Princess Alexandra of Kent, daughter of Prince George, Duke of Kent and Princess Marina, Duchess of Kent
- Princess Anne of Orléans, daughter of the Count and Countess of Paris
- Princess Tatiana Radziwiłł, daughter of Prince Dominik Rainer Radziwiłł and Princess Eugénie of Greece and Denmark

=== Broadcast ===
As television had not yet arrived in Greece (it arrived 4 years later in 1966), it was decided to use the services of the European Broadcasting Union to record the wedding on tape which was then sent to Rome, from where it was relayed to the broadcasters in the continent through the Eurovision network.

== Guests ==
=== Relatives of the groom ===
==== House of Bourbon ====
- The Count and Countess of Barcelona, the groom's parents
  - Infanta Pilar of Spain, the groom's sister
  - Infanta Margarita of Spain, the groom's sister
- Queen Victoria Eugenie of Spain, the groom's paternal grandmother
  - The Duke and Duchess of Anjou and Segovia, the groom's paternal uncle and aunt
    - Prince Alfonso of Bourbon, the groom's first cousin
    - Prince Gonzalo of Bourbon, the groom's first cousin
  - Infanta Beatriz, Princess of Civitella-Cesi, the groom's paternal aunt
    - Don Marco Torlonia di Civitella-Cesi, the groom's first cousin
    - Donna Olimpia Torlonia di Civitella-Cesi, the groom's first cousin
  - Infanta María Cristina, Countess Marone and the Count Marone, the groom's paternal aunt and uncle
    - Doña Giovanna Marone-Cinzano y Borbón, the groom's first cousin
- Infante José-Eugene of Bavaria and the Countess of Odiel, the groom's first cousin, once removed, and his wife
  - Doña María Cristina de Baviera y de Mesía, the groom's second cousin
  - Don Fernando de Baviera y de Mesía, the groom's second cousin
  - Doña María Teresa de Baviera y de Mesía, the groom's second cousin
- The Duke of Galliera, the groom's first cousin, twice removed
  - Prince Álvaro of Orléans, the groom's second cousin, once removed
    - Doña Beatriz de Orléans-Borbón y Parodi-Delfino, the groom's third cousin
    - Don Alonso de Orléans-Borbón y Parodi-Delfino, the groom's third cousin

==== House of Bourbon-Two Sicilies ====
- The Duke and Duchess of Calabria, the groom's maternal half-uncle and half-aunt
  - The Duke of Noto, the groom's half-first cousin
  - The Duchess of Syracuse, the groom's half-first cousin
- Princess María de los Dolores of Bourbon-Two Sicilies and Don Carlos Chias Osorio, the groom's maternal aunt and uncle
  - Prince Adam Karol Czartoryski, the groom's first cousin

=== Relatives of the bride ===
==== House of Glücksburg ====
- The King and Queen of the Hellenes, the bride's parents
  - The Crown Prince of Greece, the bride's brother
  - Princess Irene of Greece and Denmark, the bride's sister
- Queen Mother Helen of Romania, the bride's paternal aunt
  - King Michael I and Queen Anne of Romania, the bride's first cousin and his wife
- The Dowager Duchess of Aosta, the bride's paternal aunt
  - The Duke of Aosta, the bride's first cousin
- Lady Katherine Brandram, the bride's paternal aunt
- Princess George of Greece and Denmark, the bride's paternal grandaunt by marriage
  - Princess Eugénie, Duchess of Castel Duino, the bride's first cousin, once removed
    - Princess Tatiana Radziwiłł, the bride's second cousin
    - Prince Jerzy Radziwiłł, the bride's second cousin
- Princess and Prince Paul of Yugoslavia, the bride's first cousin once removed, and her husband
  - Prince and Princess Alexander of Yugoslavia, the bride's second cousin and his wife
- Princess Marina, Duchess of Kent, the bride's first cousin once removed and widow of the groom's second cousin once removed (representing the Queen of the United Kingdom)
  - (United Kingdom) Princess Alexandra of Kent, the bride's second cousin and the groom's third cousin
  - (United Kingdom) Prince Michael of Kent, the bride's second cousin and the groom's third cousin
- Princess Andrew of Greece and Denmark, the bride's paternal grandaunt by marriage
  - The Princess of Hohenlohe-Langenburg, the bride's first cousin once removed
    - The Prince of Hohenlohe-Langenburg, the bride's second cousin
    - Princess Beatrix of Hohenlohe-Langenburg, the bride's second cousin
  - The Margravine of Baden, the bride's first cousin once removed
    - Princess and Prince Tomislav of Yugoslavia, the bride's second cousin and third cousin
    - Prince Ludwig of Baden, the bride's second cousin
- Prince Michael of Greece and Denmark, the bride's first cousin once removed

==== House of Hanover ====
- The Prince and Princess of Hanover, the bride's maternal uncle and aunt
- Prince and Princess George William of Hanover, the bride's maternal uncle and aunt (paternal first cousin, once removed)
  - Prince Karl of Hesse, the bride's second cousin
- Prince Christian Oscar of Hanover, the bride's maternal uncle
- Prince Welf Henry of Hanover, the bride's maternal uncle

=== Other royal guests ===
==== Members of reigning royal houses ====
- The Queen of Denmark, the bride and groom's mutual second cousin once removed (representing the King of Denmark)
  - Princess Margrethe of Denmark, the bride and groom's mutual third cousin
  - Princess Benedikte of Denmark, the bride and groom's mutual third cousin
  - Princess Anne-Marie of Denmark, the bride and groom's mutual third cousin
- The Prince and Princess of Liechtenstein, the groom's fourth cousin once removed, and his wife
- The Hereditary Grand Duke and Hereditary Grand Duchess of Luxembourg, the groom's fourth cousin and the bride's third cousin (representing the Grand Duchess of Luxembourg)
- The Prince and Princess of Monaco, the groom's fifth cousin once removed, and his wife
- The Queen and Prince Consort of the Netherlands, the bride's third cousin twice removed, and her husband
  - Princess Beatrix of the Netherlands, the bride's fourth cousin once removed
  - Princess Irene of the Netherlands, the bride's fourth cousin once removed
  - Princess Margriet of the Netherlands, the bride's fourth cousin once removed
- The King of Norway, the bride and groom's mutual second cousin once removed
- The Duchess of Västerbotten, the bride and groom's mutual second cousin once removed (representing the King of Sweden)
  - Princess Margaretha of Sweden, the bride and groom's mutual third cousin
  - Princess Désirée of Sweden, the bride and groom's mutual third cousin
  - Princess Christina of Sweden, the bride and groom's mutual third cousin
- (United Kingdom) The Earl Mountbatten of Burma, the groom's first cousin twice removed (and the bride's second cousin, once removed)

==== Members of non-reigning royal houses ====
- The Duke of Bavaria, the groom's half-third cousin
- Prince Pedro Gastão and Princess María de la Esperanza of Orléans-Braganza, the groom's maternal uncle and aunt
  - Princess Maria da Glória of Orléans-Braganza, the groom's first cousin
- Prince Luiz of Orléans-Braganza, the groom's fourth cousin
- The Count and Countess of Paris, the groom's first cousin once removed, and the groom's maternal third cousin once removed
  - Princess Anne of Orléans, the groom's second cousin
  - Princess Claude of Orléans, the groom's second cousin
- The Landgrave of Hesse, the bride's first cousin once removed
  - Prince Heinrich of Hesse-Kassel, the bride's second cousin
- King Umberto II and Queen Marie-José of Italy, the groom's fourth cousin once removed and the groom's third cousin once removed
  - The Prince of Naples, the groom's fourth cousin
  - Princess Maria Gabriella of Savoy, the groom's fourth cousin
  - Princess Maria Beatrice of Savoy, the groom's fourth cousin
- Princess Maria Cristina of Savoy-Aosta, the groom's second cousin
- The Duke and Duchess of Ancona, the groom's second cousin twice removed, and his wife
- The Hereditary Grand Duke and Hereditary Grand Duchess of Mecklenburg-Schwerin, the bride's first cousin once removed, and his wife
- The Duke of Parma, the groom's paternal and maternal second cousin once removed
- Prince Carlos Hugo of Bourbon-Parma, the groom's fourth cousin once removed
- Princess René of Bourbon-Parma, the bride's first cousin twice removed
- The Duke and Duchess of Braganza, the groom's third cousin twice removed, and the groom's third cousin once removed
  - The Prince of Beira, the groom's fourth cousin
- Prince and Princess Friedrich Karl of Windisch-Grätz, the bride's second cousin and her husband
- The Duke and Duchess of Württemberg, the groom's second cousin once removed and the groom's first cousin once removed
  - The Hereditary Duke and Hereditary Duchess of Württemberg, the groom's second cousins

=== Other notable guests ===
- The Duchess of Alba
- Don Felipe José Abárzuza y Oliva, Minister of the Spanish Navy (representing Generalísimo Francisco Franco)
- Marquess and Marchioness of Blandford
- Aristotle Onassis

== Aftermath ==
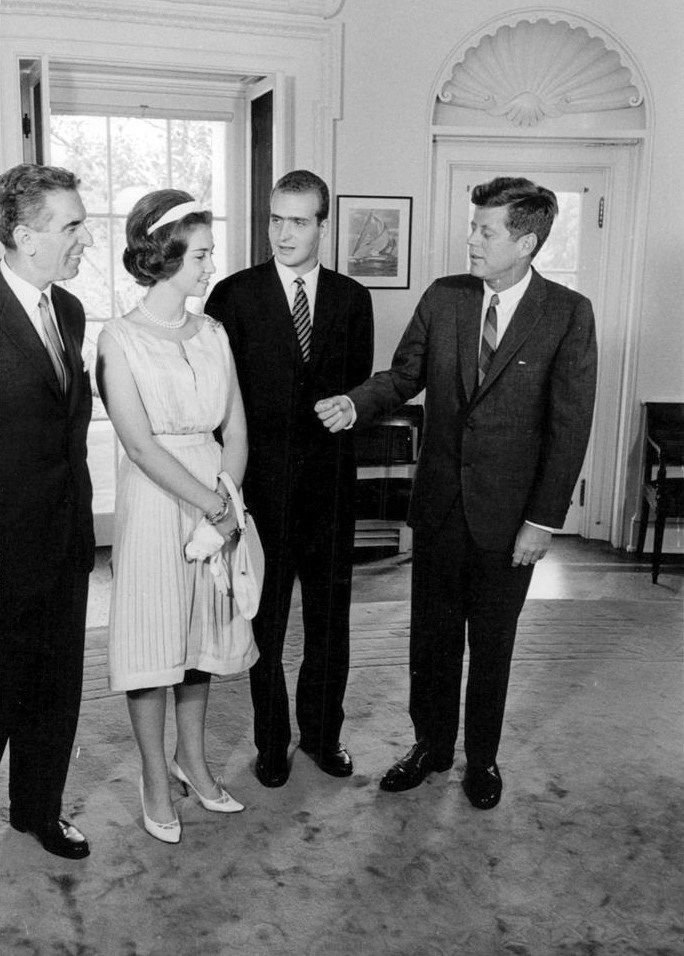
The newlywed Prince and Princess of Asturias with US President John F. Kennedy, 4 September 1962.

As of 2022, Juan Carlos and Sofía have been married for 60 years. They have three children, Elena (born 1963), Cristina (born 1965) and Felipe (born 1968), current King of Spain. In 1975, the pair acceded to the Spanish throne following the death of Francisco Franco. They reigned for nearly 39 years until his abdication in 2014. They have lived separately since August 2020 when Juan Carlos left Spain in exile amid corruption accusations.

=== Honeymoon ===
The couple travelled extensively on their honeymoon. They initially set out on a yacht cruise around the Greek islands. Further destinations included Spain, Monaco, Italy, India, Thailand, the United States and Japan. In Italy, they had an audience with Pope John XXIII. In the United States, they met with President John F. Kennedy. While the couple were away, Franco and the Count of Barcelona were in talks about the future of the Spanish monarchy and neither party could agree on where the young couple should live.

Eventually, they returned to Spain where they settled in the Palace of Zarzuela. They would live at Zarzuela for the next 58 years until Juan Carlos left Spain in exile. It is unclear whether Queen Sofía will remain living there or not.

=== Reaction in Spain ===
In Spain, Franco allowed No-Do and three major newspapers to cover the wedding. Footage of the wedding was also shown on Televisión Española. However, no images of the groom's father, the Count of Barcelona, who was on bad terms with Franco, were allowed to be shown. Spanish monarchists rejoiced at the marriage.

Franco bestowed the Order of Charles III on both Juan Carlos and Sofía.

=== Subsequent royal marriages ===
As this wedding brought together many young, unmarried nobles, many more royal weddings came about as a result. Among the couples who met or became better acquainted at the wedding who later married:

- Prince Carlos Hugo of Bourbon-Parma and Princess Irene of the Netherlands, married on 29 April 1964, divorced in 1981.
- Prince Amedeo, Duke of Aosta, and Princess Claude of Orléans, married on 22 July 1964, divorced in 1982.
- Crown Prince Constantine of Greece and Princess Anne-Marie of Denmark, married on 18 September 1964.
- Prince Carlos, Duke of Noto, and Princess Anne of Orléans, married on 12 May 1965.
