= Infante Carlos, Duke of Calabria =

Spanish infante (1938–2015)

Infante Carlos
- Duke of Calabria (more)
- Photographed in his studio in a Teba jacket

Head of the House of Bourbon-Two Sicilies
- Tenure: 3 February 1964 – 5 October 2015
- Predecessor: Infante Alfonso
- Successor: Prince Pedro
- Born: 16 January 1938; Lausanne, Switzerland
- Died: 5 October 2015 (aged 77); Retuerta del Bullaque, Spain
- Burial: El Escorial, Spain
- Spouse: Princess Anne of Orléans (m. 1965)
- Issue: Princess Cristina; Archduchess María of Austria; Prince Pedro, Duke of Calabria; Princess Inés; Princess Victoria
Names
- Spanish: Carlos María Alfonso Marcelo
- House: Bourbon-Two Sicilies
- Father: Infante Alfonso, Duke of Calabria
- Mother: Princess Alicia of Bourbon-Parma
- Religion: Roman Catholic

Royal styles of Infante Carlos of Spain, Duke of Calabria
- Reference style: His Royal Highness
- Spoken style: Your Royal Highness

Don Carlos María Alfonso Marcelo de Borbón-Dos Sicilias y Borbón-Parma, Infante of Spain, Duke of Calabria (16 January 1938 – 5 October 2015) was, at his death, the last male infante of Spain during the reigns of his cousins King Juan Carlos I and King Felipe VI.

Additionally, he was also one of two claimants to the headship of the dynasty which ruled the Kingdom of the Two Sicilies prior to its incorporation into the Kingdom of Italy in 1861, in which capacity he was also the Grand Master of one of the three branches of the Sacred Military Constantinian Order of Saint George.

== Early life and education ==
The second of three children and the only son of Infante Alfonso de Borbón-Dos Sicilias y Borbón (1901–1964) and Princess Alicia of Bourbon-Parma (1917–2017), he was born during his parents' exile from republican Spain in Lausanne, Switzerland. As the elder son of Prince Carlo of Bourbon-Two Sicilies by Mercedes, Princess of Asturias (1880–1904), the eldest child of Alfonso XII of Spain, Alfonso had been heir presumptive to the Spanish throne between the death in childbirth of his mother and the birth in May 1907 of a son to his mother's brother, King Alfonso XIII. If Mateu Morral's attempt to assassinate King Alfonso XIII of Spain had succeeded, Infante Alfonso (Infante Carlos's father) would have become at that moment the King of Spain.

Raised from infancy side-by-side with his future king, Juan Carlos I (Carlos's elder by 11 days), the cousins attended school together first in Switzerland and later in Spain. Carlos was chosen by the Spanish pretender, Don Juan de Borbón, Count of Barcelona, to become Juan Carlos's roommate at a boarding school that Don Juan and Spain's dictator Francisco Franco agreed to establish to bring the potential future king from his family's exile in Portugal to be educated in Spain. The school was the site of a country house, Las Jarillas, located 10 miles north of Madrid and donated for the purpose by the Marquess of Urquijo.

In November 1948 Carlos and Juan Carlos took up residence there, along with eight selected sons of the aristocracy (and one commoner, the future cabinet member José Luis Leal Maldonado) and a team of tutors selected by Don Juan, including as headmaster the liberal scholar José Garrido, along with a traditionalist chaplain, Ignacio de Zulueta. Over the course of the next two years, under the guidance of Pedro Martínez de Irujo y Caro, Duque de Sotomayor in loco parentis, the princes were carefully educated and introduced to distinguished Spaniards, including Franco himself as well as Leopoldo Calvo Sotelo and Fernando Alvarez de Miranda. The princes obtained their bacs from the Colegiata de San Isidro de Madrid, and reunited to take courses in law together at the University of Madrid, remaining close friends throughout.

== Family ==
Carlos lived in Madrid with his family. Their assets included agricultural properties in Toledo and Ciudad Real. He also held investments in major companies, including Repsol and Telefonica.

=== Marriage ===
In April 1961 Carlos met his future wife, Princess Anne of Orléans, in Madrid, at the wedding of his elder sister, Princess Teresa, with Don Iñigo Moreno, future Marquess of Laula. In May 1962 they met again at the wedding in Athens of Infante Juan Carlos to Princess Sophia, daughter of the Greek king Paul of the Hellenes, appearing together at each of several occasions over the course of the week-long wedding celebrations. Two months later, Anne was invited to and visited the home of Carlos's parents at Toledana. By the end of 1963, the secret was out: French news media pictured the couple together and speculated about the date when the engagement of the royal couple would be announced publicly.

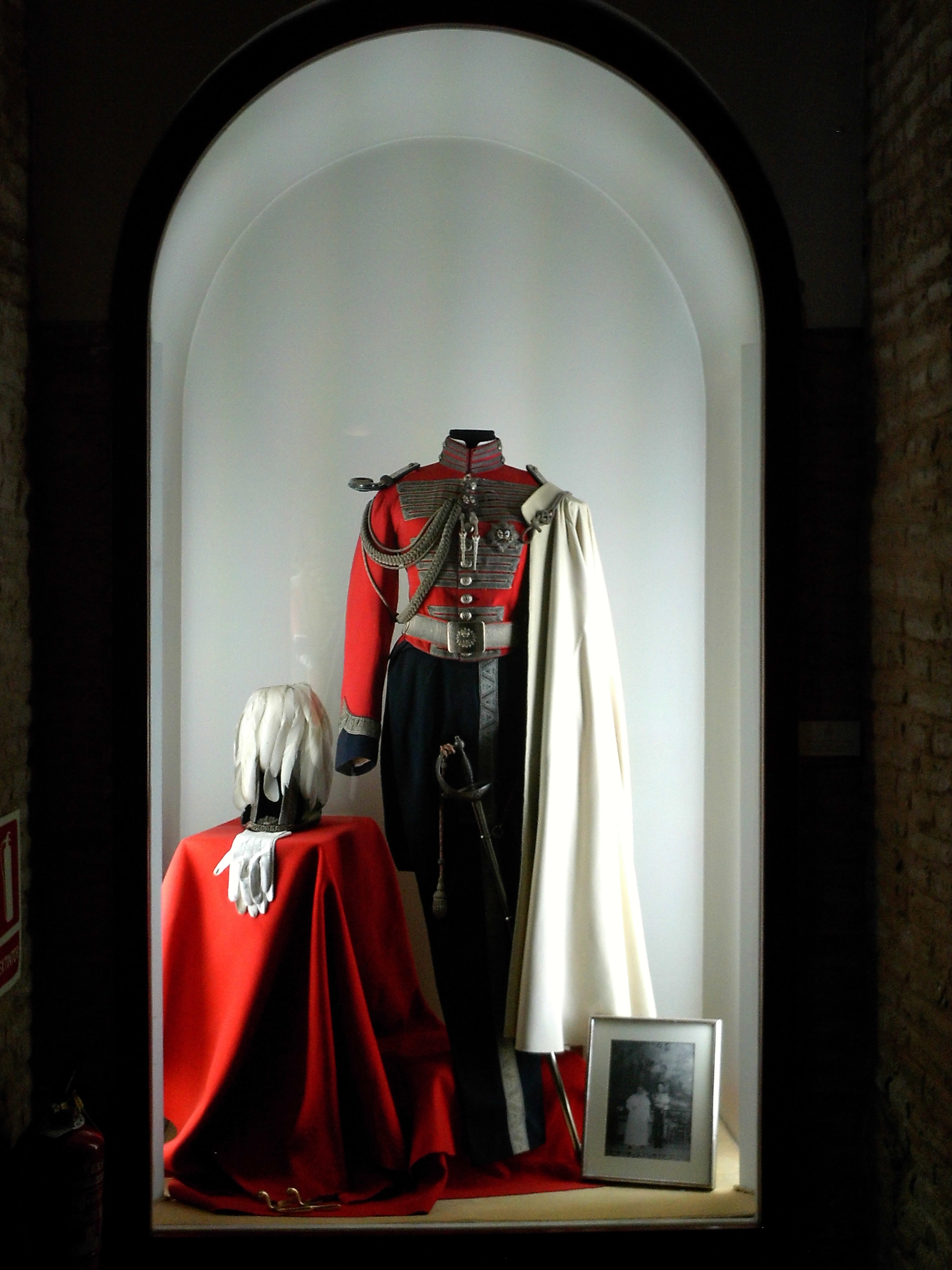
Carlos's uniform of the Real Maestranza de Caballería de Sevilla, worn by him as 'best man' to the royal wedding in 1962 of his cousin Juan Carlos of Spain.

Although both were Roman Catholic Bourbons by male-line descent, a disagreement now erupted between the couple's fathers about the dynastic claim of Carlos's father to the legacy of the deposed House of Bourbon-Two Sicilies dynasty, whose last undisputed head, Ferdinand, Duke of Calabria, died without a son in January 1960. Carlos's father, Infante Alfonso, had asserted himself as rightful heir because his late father, Carlo of Bourbon-Two Sicilies (1870–1949), had been Ferdinand's next oldest brother. Anne's father Henri, Count of Paris, however, upheld the claim of Ferdinand's next younger brother, Prince Ranieri, Duke of Castro (1883–1973) to the headship of the house, contending that Carlo had renounced his and his future descendants' Sicilian rights when he married the Spanish heiress presumptive, Mercedes of Asturias, in 1901, no doubt being mindful that his own claim to be head of the royal House of France depended upon the validity of the 1713 renunciation of a senior Bourbon prince, Philip V of Spain, in favor of the junior House of Orléans. The Count of Paris withheld his consent, thus plans for the couple's marriage were dropped.

Carlos's father died in 1964, and with patience, persistence and compromise from afar, he eventually obtained the hand of his bride. The 250 guests received one of two different invitations from either the bride's parents or the groom; the former referred to the bride's marriage to HRH Prince Carlos of Bourbon, while the latter announced the wedding of Princess Anne of France to the Duke of Calabria. On 11 May 1965 at Louveciennes the "lovers of the Gotha" (as the press dubbed the couple) were married in a civil ceremony and the following day, the Comte de Paris escorted his daughter to the altar at the Chapelle royale de Dreux, the Orléans' traditional parish chapel and necropolis, for Catholic nuptials.

=== Issue ===
The couple had five children:

- Princess Cristina of Bourbon-Two Sicilies (born 15 March 1966 in Madrid), married Pedro López-Quesada y Fernández-Urrutia on 15 July 1994 in Ciudad Real. They have two children.
- Princess María of Bourbon-Two Sicilies (born 5 April 1967 in Madrid), married Archduke Simeon of Austria (born 29 June 1958 in Katana), son of Archduke Rudolf of Austria and Countess Xenia Czernichev-Besobrasov, on 13 July 1996 in La Toledana. They have five children.
- Prince Pedro of Bourbon-Two Sicilies, Duke of Calabria (born 16 October 1968 in Madrid), married Sofía Landaluce y Melgarejo (born 23 November 1973 in Madrid) on 30 March 2001 in Madrid. They have seven children.
- Princess Inès of Bourbon-Two Sicilies (born 20 April 1971 in Madrid), married Nobile Michele Carrelli Palombi dei Marchesi di Raiano (born 17 September 1965 in Rome) on 13 October 2001 in Toledo. They have two daughters.
- Princess Victoria of Bourbon-Two Sicilies (born 24 May 1976 in Madrid), married Markos Nomikos (born 29 October 1965 in Kifissia) on 27 September 2003. They have four children.

== Endeavors ==
Departing Europe to spend a year abroad after his broken engagement, Carlos rounded out his study of the law with internships at several banks in the Americas, notably Chase Manhattan in New York, the National Bank of Mexico and the Banco Popular del Peru. Following marriage, Carlos and his wife remained for sometime guests of the Marquès de Decio, head of the household of Infante Alfonso in his capacity as Duke of Calabria. In 1966 the couple took up residence in a large apartment in the heart of Madrid.

Carlos then launched a professional specialization in financial law and banking. After his father's death in 1964 he also managed his family's large agricultural holdings in Spain.

== Claimant ==
Infante Carlos was one of two claimants of the dignity of Head of the Royal House of the Two Sicilies. The other claimant was his second cousin Prince Carlo of Bourbon-Two Sicilies, Duke of Castro. Infante Carlos was also one of two claimants to the Grand Magistery of the Sacred Military Constantinian Order of Saint George; the other claimant is Carlo, Duke of Castro.

Infante Carlos was the senior male-line descendant of Ferdinand IV and III of Naples and Sicily (Ferdinand I of the Two Sicilies) and as such "first born legitimate heir of the Farnese" (primogenito legittimo farnesiano), as Ferdinand was designated by his father, King Charles III of Spain, on 16 October 1759 (ten days after abdicating the Two Sicilies Crown). Although Ferdinand had two elder brothers, his eldest brother was mentally impaired and deemed unfit to inherit any crown; his next eldest brother, meanwhile, was his father's heir to the crown of Spain; treaty provisions prevented the union of the crowns of Spain, Naples and Sicily on the head of one person.

== Titles and honors ==
=== Titles ===
Prince Carlos was created an Infante of Spain by King Juan Carlos I of Spain by Royal Decree 2412 dated 16 December 1994 as the "representative of a line linked historically to the Spanish Crown".

=== Honors ===
- Spain:
  - Dean Knight with Collar of the Order of the Golden Fleece
  - Chancellor Knight with Collar of the Royal Military Order of Alcántara
  - Protector of the Real Cuerpo de la Nobleza of Madrid
  - Maestrante of Sevilla, Zaragoza, Granada, Valencia and Ronda,
  - Member of the Real Cuerpo de la Nobleza of Catalonia
  - Member of the Cofradía del Santo Cáliz of Valencia
  - Patron-President of the Foundation of the Military Order's Hospital of Santiago de Cuenca (Patrono-Presidente de la Fundación de las Ordenes Militares Hospital de Santiago de Cuenca).
  - President of the Spanish Foundation of the United World College,
  - President of the Patronato of the Naval Museum
  - President of the Spanish Confederation of Foundations,
  - President of the Iberoamerican Confederation of Foundations,
  - President of the Foundation of San Benito de Alcántara, and President of the Foundation for the Protection of Nature (Fundación Fondo para la Protección de la Naturaleza). He died on 5 October 2015 at the age of 77, in his finca "La Toledana", in Retuerta del Bullaque.
- Serbia:
  - Order of Karađorđe's Star

Under the traditional succession laws of the Kingdom of Navarre, Carlos's mother Infanta Alicia, born a Princess of Bourbon-Parma, was the claimant to that throne, which was formally united with the Kingdom of France in the seventeenth century. She was also the closest known genealogical representative of King Edward the Confessor, and the direct genealogical representative of King David I of Scotland.

== Arms ==
Heraldry of Infante Carlos, Duke of Calabria

Coat of Arms as Duke of Noto
(1960–1964)

Coat of Arms as Duke of Calabria and Pretender
(1964–2015)

Coat of Arms as knight of the Golden Fleece
(1964–2015)

Coat of Arms as Spanish Infante
(1994–2015)

== Ancestry ==
Ancestors of Infante Carlos, Duke of Calabria

8. Prince Alfonso, Count of Caserta
4. Prince Carlos of Bourbon-Two Sicilies
9. Princess Maria Antonietta of Bourbon-Two Sicilies
2. Infante Alfonso, Duke of Calabria
10. Alfonso XII of Spain
5. María de las Mercedes, Princess of Asturias
11. Archduchess Maria Christina of Austria
1. Infante Carlos, Duke of Calabria
12. Robert I, Duke of Parma
6. Elias, Duke of Parma
13. Princess Maria Pia of Bourbon-Two Sicilies
3. Princess Alice of Bourbon-Parma
14. Archduke Friedrich, Duke of Teschen
7. Archduchess Maria Anna of Austria
15. Princess Isabella of Croÿ

Infante Carlos, Duke of Calabria House of Bourbon-Two Sicilies Cadet branch of the House of Bourbon Born: 16 January 1938 Died: 5 October 2015
Preceded by Alfonso	— TITULAR — King of the Two Sicilies; 1964–2015; Reason for succession failure: Italian unification under the House of Savoy	Succeeded by Pedro
