= Sacred Military Constantinian Order of Saint George =

Dynastic chivalric order of the House of Bourbon-Two Sicilies

- Cross of the order
- Type: Dynastic order
- Founded: c. 1545
- Royal house: Bourbon-Two Sicilies; Bourbon-Parma
- Religious affiliation: Catholic
- Seat: Santa Croce in Via Flaminia, Rome
- Ribbon: Light blue
- Motto: In hoc signo vinces
- Founder: Constantine the Great (legendary); Andrea Angelo Flavio Comneno (actual)
- Grand Master: Disputed: Prince Pedro, Duke of Calabria; Prince Carlo, Duke of Castro; Prince Carlos, Duke of Parma
- Grades: House of Bourbon-Two Sicilies: See all House of Bourbon-Parma: Senator Grand Cross with Collar; Senator Grand Cross; Knight/Dame Commander; Knight/Dame 1st class Knight/Dame 2nd class

Precedence
- Next (higher): House of Bourbon-Two Sicilies: Royal Order of Saint Januarius; House of Bourbon-Parma: None (highest)
- Next (lower): House of Bourbon-Two Sicilies: Royal Order of Saint Ferdinand and of Merit; House of Bourbon-Parma: Ducal Royal Order of Saint Louis
- Ribbon of the order

The Sacred Military Constantinian Order of Saint George (SMCOSG; Italian: Sacro Militare Ordine Costantiniano di San Giorgio; Spanish: Sagrada Orden Militar Constantiniana de San Jorge), also historically referred to as the Imperial Constantinian Order of Saint George and the Order of the Constantinian Angelic Knights of Saint George, is a dynastic order of knighthood of the House of Bourbon-Two Sicilies. Currently, the grand magistry of the order is disputed among the two claimants to the headship of the formerly reigning House of Bourbon-Two Sicilies as heirs of the House of Farnese, namely Prince Pedro and Prince Carlo. The order was one of the rare orders confirmed as a religious-military order in the papal bull Militantis Ecclesiae in 1718, owing to a notable success in liberating persecuted Christians in the Peloponnese. Together with the Sovereign Military Order of Malta, it is one of a small number of Catholic orders that still have this status today. It is not an order of chivalry under the patronage of the Holy See, but its membership is restricted to practising Catholics.

Although the order is alleged to have been founded in its original form by Constantine the Great in Antiquity and then restored under later Byzantine emperors, the actual origin of the order can be traced to the 16th century, when it was founded by an Albanian noble Engjëlli family. This family, extinct in 1698, claimed to be connected to the Byzantine Komnenos and Angelos dynasties, but such a direct familial connection was referred to several other branches; that lineage does, however, descend from a marriage into the Arianiti family that has several descents from past Byzantine imperial families. Chivalric orders were completely unknown in the Byzantine world, so much of the alleged history of the order was invented much later. Outside the generally recognized line of grand masters from its origin in the 16th century to the present day, there have been many people claiming to be grand masters who have been forgers and title-seekers hoping to gain support for invented lines of descent from ancient and medieval nobility.

== History ==
=== Origins ===
The legendary origins of the Sacred Military Constantinian Order of Saint George trace its foundation to an apocryphal order founded by Constantine the Great (r. 306–337). Although it has sometimes been held that the order was restored/created by the Byzantine emperor Isaac II Angelos (r. 1185–1195, 1203–1204), any claimed connection between chivalric orders and the Byzantine Empire are pure fantasy, as chivalric orders in the modern Western sense were completely unknown in the Byzantine world. At best, any connection to some ancient group would be excessively indirect and abstracted.

The order was actually claimed by Albanian nobles of the Angelo Flavio Comneno family branch (only one of many connected to the Byzantine houses of Angelos and Komnenos) in the 16th century, notably Andrea Angelo Flavio Comneno, and his brother Paolo Angelo Flavio Comneno, in 1545. In 1545, the brothers Andrea and Paolo were acknowledged as descendants of the Angeloi emperors (a claim seen as doubtful today) by Pope Paul III, this recognition being in part due to their familial connections with the Medici, Orsini, del Balzo and Riargo families. The brothers were also guaranteed the right to inherit territory in the former Byzantine Empire, should such territory be recovered from the Ottomans. Their family remained grand masters of the order until 1698 when Giovanni Andrea II, who also claimed the titles of "Prince of Macedonia", "Duke of Thessaly" and "Count of Drivasto, Durazzo etc." as the last male member of his family, transferred the grand mastership of the order to Francesco Farnese, the duke of Parma.

Outside the generally recognized line of grand masters from its origin in the 17th century to the present day, there have been various claims to the title of grand master by imposters hoping to gain support for invented lines of descent from various Byzantine dynasties.

=== Farnese family, male primogeniture ===
Its incorporation as a religious order of the Catholic Church hereditary in the House of Farnese and its heirs, the Bourbons, dates from the transfer to Francesco Farnese on 11 January 1698, an act confirmed in an imperial diploma, "Agnoscimus et notum facimus", of the emperor, Leopold I, dated 5 August 1699, and the apostolic brief, "Sincerae Fidei", issued by Pope Innocent XII on 24 October 1699.

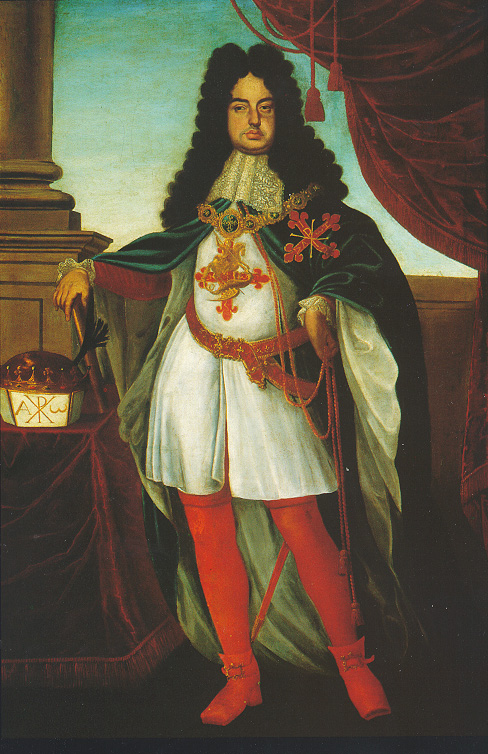
The Duke of Parma wearing the ceremonial robes of the order

These confirmed the succession of the grand magistry to the Farnese family and its heirs as an ecclesiastical office (therefore limited to males) and, crucially, did not tie it to tenure of sovereignty of the Duchy of Parma. Among the first major acts of the Farnese grand magistry were revised, amended and expanded statutes, issued on 25 May 1705 and confirmed in a papal brief dated 12 July 1706. Both these confirmed the requirement that the grand magistry should pass by male primogeniture. Following the order's contribution to Prince Eugene of Savoy's campaign to drive the Turks from the Balkans between 1716 and 1718, Pope Clement XI, a former cardinal protector of the order, confirmed the order as a religious order of the Catholic Church in the bull, "Militantis Ecclesiae", of 27 May 1718.

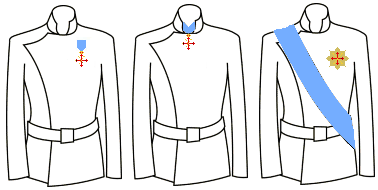
Knight, Knight Commander, Knight Grand Cross

=== Claim by the House of Two Sicilies ===
With the death of the last male of the House of Farnese on 30 January 1731, the grand magistry was inherited by Charles, eldest son of Elisabeth Farnese and King Philip V of Spain; Charles also inherited the duchies of Parma and Piacenza from the Farnese. After becoming king of Naples and Sicily in 1734, Charles was forced to surrender Parma to Austria in 1736, but he retained the Constantinian grand magistry and continued to exercise control of the Order even after his younger brother became duke of Parma in 1748. On 16 October 1759, Charles abdicated the grand magistry (ten days after abdicating from his Italian realms) to his second surviving son, King Ferdinand IV and III of Naples and Sicily (from 1815 Ferdinand I of the Two Sicilies). The administration of the order was transferred from Parma to Naples in 1768. although the Order in Parma continued to be under Neapolitan control until 1797 when the estates of the Order were seized by the French.

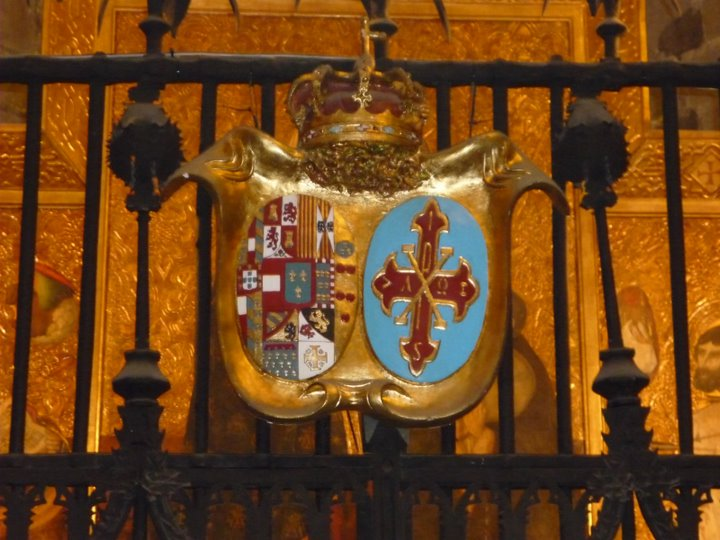
Arms of the House of Bourbon-Two Sicilies as grand masters of the Constantinian Order, Cathedral of Barcelona

With the French occupying the kingdom of Naples from 1806, the Order was confined to Sicily but with the expulsion of the French it was not only restored to its former position but continued to function under Ferdinand I and his successor heads of the House of Bourbon-Two Sicilies as a religious military Order with an expanding membership and the addition of many new commanderies. The independence of the Order assured its survival after the unification of Italy, confirmed in a declaration of the Procurator-General of the new kingdom of Italy and an 1871 decision of the highest Italian court. A decree of King Ferdinand dated 8 March 1796, stated: "In his (the king's) royal person there exists together two very distinct qualities, the one of monarch of the Two Sicilies, and the other of grand master of the illustrious, royal and military Constantinian Order, which though united gloriously in the same person form nonetheless at the same time two separate independent lordships".

Some of the Parmesan nobility had resented the Order being controlled by an absent monarch but when in 1748, Charles III's younger brother Philip succeeded as duke of Parma, he explicitly recognised his brother Charles and later his nephew Ferdinand as grand master in a series of decrees and official acts. Philip's son Ferdinand, after becoming duke of Parma, sent an emissary to the Spanish court to try to persuade the king of Spain to intervene with the king of Naples and Sicily and persuade the latter to give up the grand mastership, but without success.

=== Separate Parmesan Order from 1817 ===
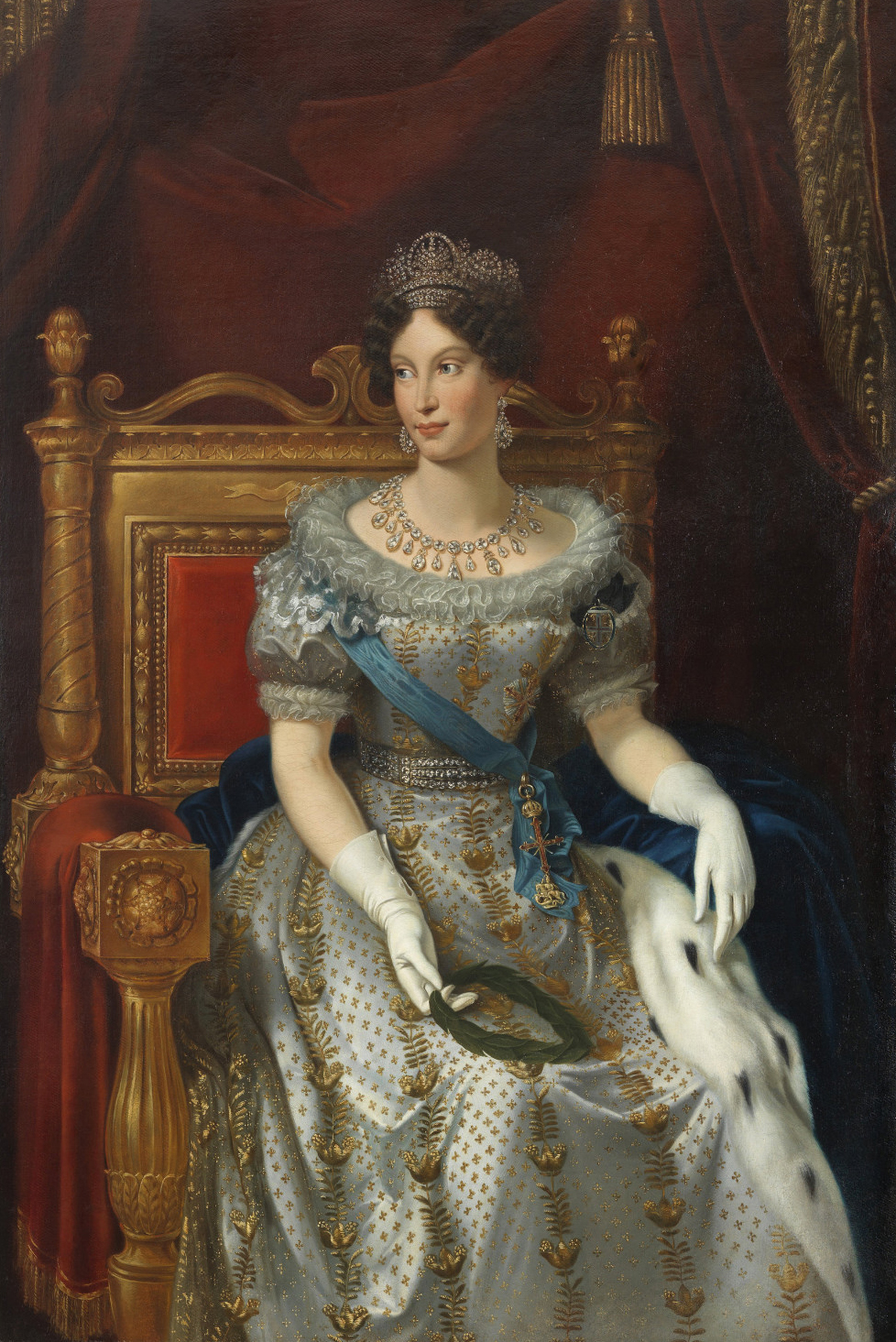
Marie Louise, Duchess of Parma, wearing the sash of the order, 1835

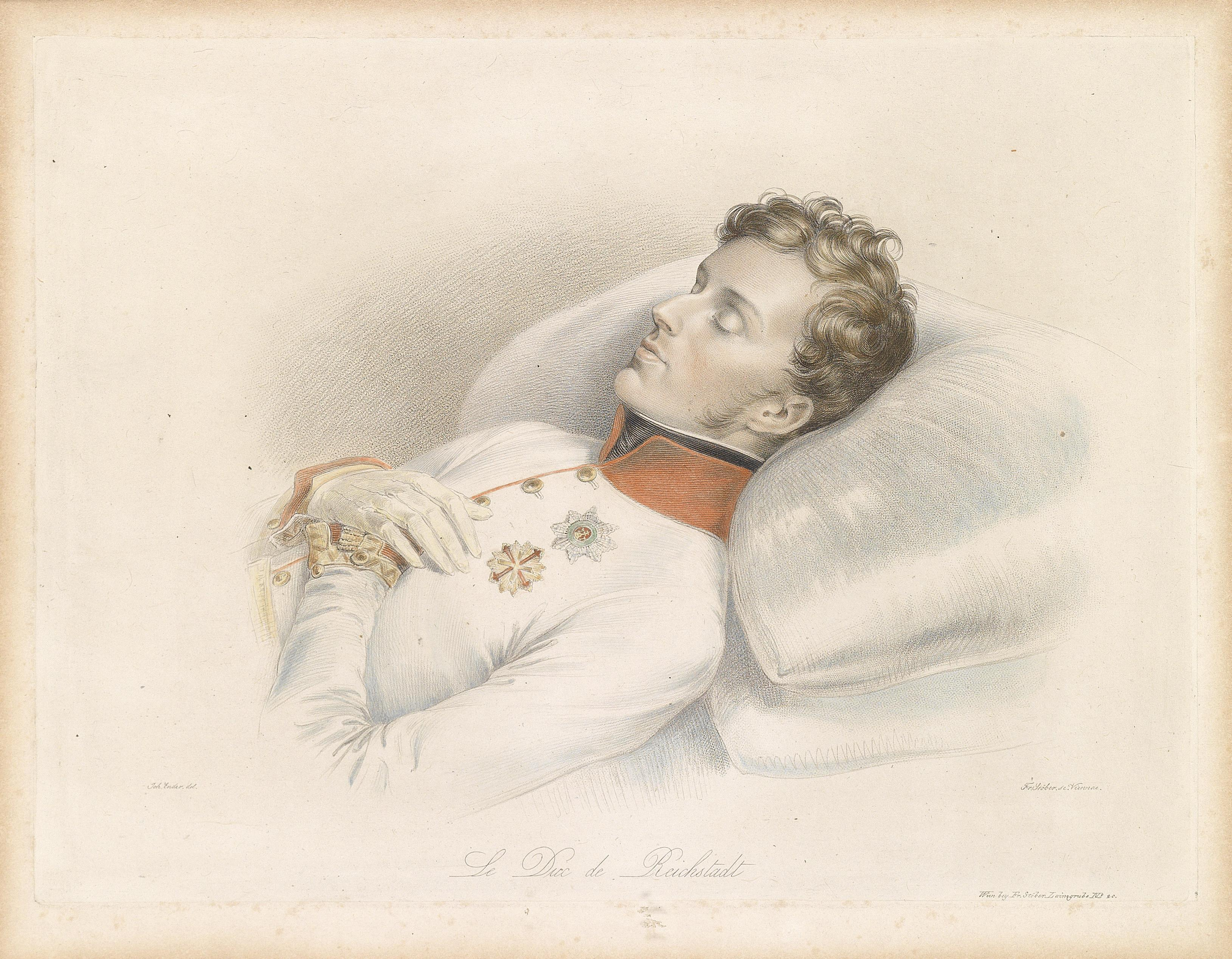
Napoleon II wearing the cross of the order in his deathbed, 1832

The Parmesan Constantinian Order was a new foundation, instituted by Marie Louise, Duchess of Parma, in 1817 and following her death Charles I, Duke of Lucca, heir to the Bourbon-Parma succession, became duke of Parma under the terms of the Congress of Vienna and assumed the grand mastership which is today claimed by Prince Carlos, Duke of Parma. See the historical note authored by Paolo Conforte, a senior officer of the Parma dynastic order, who maintains that the Parma Order, despite its late foundation, is the successor of the original order; this view was explicitly rejected by the Holy See in 1860 and in 1913 the Holy See did not respond to a request from the Parma ducal family to accord their order similar privileges to those granted to the order of which Prince Alfonso, Count of Caserta was grand master.

The main Church of the "Parmesan" Order is still the Basilica Sanctuary of Santa Maria della Steccata.

=== The Order under the House of Two Sicilies ===
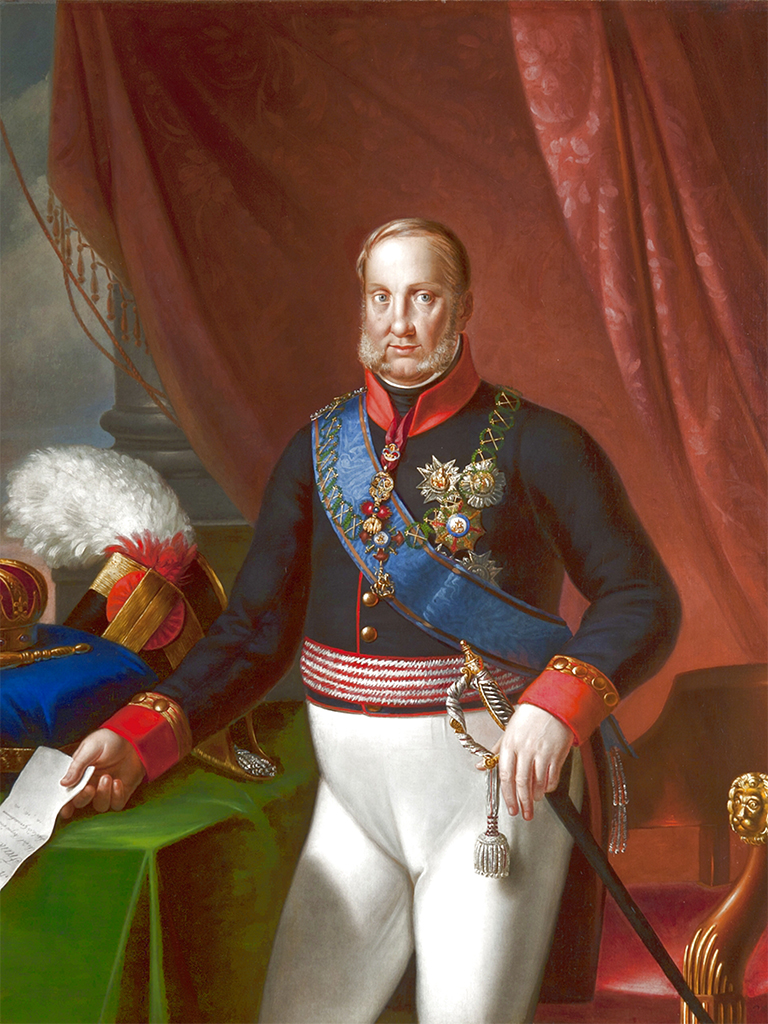
Portrait of Francis I of the Two Sicilies, king of the Two-Sicilies, wearing the collar of the order

In 1910, Pope Pius X appointed the first of three successive cardinal protectors and, in 1913, approved a series of privileges for the chaplains of the order. In 1915, Pope Benedict XV dedicated the Constantinian chapel in the basilica of Santa Croce al Flaminio, which had been built with donations from the knights, who included Monsignor Eugenio Pacelli, later Pope Pius XII. In 1916, the pope restored the church of Saint Anthony Abbot to the Order - this church had originally been given to the Constantinian order along with most of the properties in the Kingdom of Naples of the religious order of that name in 1777, but had been put under the direction of the archdiocese of Naples in 1861.

In 1919, new statutes received papal approval and Cardinal Ranuzzi de' Bianchi was appointed cardinal protector, the last to hold this post. Following the intervention of the grand magistry of the Order of Saints Maurice and Lazarus in 1924, whose grand master, the king of Italy, objected to the awarding of the order to leading Italian noblemen, the Holy See felt the close relationship with Prince Alfonso, Count of Caserta might prove an obstacle to settling the Roman question. It was, therefore, decided not to reappoint a successor to Cardinal Ranuzzi de' Bianchi at his death in 1927.

=== The Order's historic relationship with the Holy See and the succession to the Grand Mastership ===
There are several important Papal bulls, brief, decrees and monitors which establish the Order as a subject of canon law and in particular its succession to the heirs of the Farnese, rather than tying it to any sovereign state. Pope Clement XI in a Papal Brief of 24 October 1706, wrote: "...we declare that the dignity of the Grand Mastership is hereditary in the House of Farnese, and that it must descend to the legitimate male primogeniture of that family and to their male descendants forever…" and in the Papal Bull Militantis Ecclesiae of 27 May 1718, the same Pope declared: "“Desiring that the triumphs of the Church Militant, which under God’s guidance the Constantinian Order—begun by Constantine the Great under the banner of Saint George— has for so many centuries nobly continued, may likewise be perpetuated, We… approve, confirm, and establish for all time that same Order under the rules and statute approved by Us... and We establish the Grand Mastership thereof in the House of Farnese, decreeing that it shall remain there forever, to descend through the male line of lawful birth, according to the tenor of the statutes issued by that same Duke. Let no man dare to infringe or oppose these letters; and if anyone should presume to attempt it, let him know that he will incur the wrath of Almighty God and of the blessed Apostles Peter and Paul."

In a Papal Monitor dated 24 September 1763, Pope Clement XIII declared: "Since the Sacred Military Constantinian Order of Saint George has been recognised, approved, and confirmed by Our predecessor Roman Pontiffs as a true religious body of the Church, canonically erected under rule, and since the Grand Magistry of the same has been decreed to descend perpetually in the Farnese House by legitimate male primogeniture, We have learned with deep sorrow that certain men, moved by a spirit of presumption, have dared to usurp the name, titles, or insignia of the said Order and to claim false pretexts as though confirmed by certain authorities, act which clearly brings grave injury to that religion and to its lawful Grand Master. Therefore, by apostolic authority, through this present Monitory Letter, We admonish and command all the faithful of Christ, both lay and clerical, that no one may use the name or insignia of the said Order without permission of its lawful Grand Master, Ferdinand, King of Naples and Sicily, under pain of excommunication latae sententiae. Furthermore, We decree and declare that the said Order is wholly exempt from the jurisdiction of any temporal power and is subject only to the authority of the Holy See in these matters. Therefore let it be permitted to no one at all to violate these letters of Our Monitor or to oppose them by rash boldness; and if anyone should presume to attempt this, let him know that he will incur the wrath of Almighty God and of the Blessed Apostles Peter and Paul. Given at Rome, at Saint Mary Major, in the year of Our Lord 1763, on the 24th day of September, the fifth year of Our Pontificate."

In recognition of Papal Authority, King Ferdinand IV, in his capacity as Grand Master, published the following decree: "Wishing, in order to remove every doubt that might arise in future concerning the nature and character of the Constantinian Order of Saint George, to declare and establish with public authority the true principles of its institution, We declare that the Constantinian Order is a military Religion under the immediate dependence of the Holy Apostolic See, recognised and confirmed by the Sovereign Pontiffs, and therefore it can in no way be regarded or governed as a mere secular or political institution. We further declare that the dignity of the Grand Magistry is not annexed to the Crown of Our Realm, but constitutes a distinct and separate inheritance, derived from the Farnese Dukes and transmitted to Us by legitimate male succession of their line. We therefore order that in all public and private acts, both civil and ecclesiastical, a clear distinction shall be made between Our Royal Majesty and Our capacity as Grand Master of the Constantinian Order. And We command Our Ministers and Secretaries of State, and all whom it may concern, to hold exact and inviolable regard for the present declaration, as a fundamental law of the Order, to be preserved perpetually. Given at Naples, this twenty-seventh day of March 1796, the thirty-sixth year of Our Reign."

Appointment of a Cardinal Protector: “His Holiness Our Lord, Pope Pius X, having graciously acceded to the request of His Royal Highness the Count of Caserta, Grand Master of the Sacred Military Constantinian Order of Saint George, has been pleased to appoint His Eminence Cardinal Domenico Ferrata as Protector of the said Order. This is communicated to the aforementioned Cardinal Ferrata for his due information, with the understanding that in the conferral of this title and office every power of ecclesiastical jurisdiction has been expressly excluded. From the Vatican, 7 March 1910. Cardinal R. Merry del Val.” Cardinal Ferrata remained Protector until his appointment as Secretary of State in 1913 and he was then replaced by Francesco di Paula Cardinal Cassetta. at the latter's death in 1919 he was succeeded by Amadeo Cardinal Ranuzzi de' Bianchi, whose position was temporarily suspended in 1924 during the negotiations to settle the "Roman Question" which ended with the Lateran Treaty of 1929. Cardinal Ranuzzi de' Bianchi died in 1927 and no successor was appointed. The position and title of Cardinal Protector no longer exists in canon Law.

In 1922 the Order was granted a renewal of the Calendar of Divine Office, conferred in 1911 and today the Order has a Grand Prior Cardinal Gerhard Ludwig Müller and a Prior of Italy Cardinal Dominique Mamberti Prefect of the Apostolic Segnatura, and among the membership a further eleven other Cardinals who hold the rank of Bailiff Grand Cross of the Order.

=== Juridical recognition ===
The Italian Republic recognises the order as an Order of Chivalry under Law No. 178 of 1951. The authorisation to Italian citizens awarded the Constantinian decorations to wear was confirmed in a decision of the Italian State Council (number 1869/81), at first limited to awards made by the junior line claimant, Prince Ferdinand, but in 2004 extended to the awards by the Infante Don Carlos. Therefore, those citizens lawfully awarded with Constantinian decorations can request permission to wear them on the territory of the Italian Republic by Presidential Decree or Decree of the Ministry of Foreign Affairs. By a 1973 Decree of the President of the Republic, a National Italian Association of the Knights of the Sacred Military Constantinian Order of St. George was formed by Prince Ferdinando (whose father Prince Ranieri had died that year) The order is on the Orders, decorations, and medals of Italy list.

=== Disputed succession, further schism of the Order ===
The succession to the grand magistry of this order has been disputed among as many as three branches of Bourbons since 1960. The dispute is rooted in different interpretations of the so-called "Act of Cannes" of 14 December 1900 in which the count of Caserta's second son, Prince Carlo (grandfather of Infante Carlos, Duke of Calabria), promised that he would renounce his eventual succession to the crown of the Two Sicilies in execution of the "Pragmatic Decree" of 1759. This decree required that if the king of Spain, or his immediate heir, should inherit the Two Sicilies crown, he would renounce the latter to the next in line. Whether the "Pragmatic Decree" applied to Prince Carlo's situation in 1900, and whether the grand magistry of the order was included in such a renunciation, are both issues in dispute, yet within the world of academia, the latter has been, almost without exception, ruled in favour of the Hispano-Neapolitan branch. The Act of Cannes literally states:

Before Us, Don Alfonso de Borbón, Count of Caserta... Head of the Royal House and Dynasty of the Two Sicilies... His Royal Highness Prince Don Carlos, our beloved Son, appears and declares that, having to marry HRH Infanta María de las Mercedes, Princess of Asturias, and assuming by such marriage the nationality and quality of Spanish Prince, understands to renounce as by this Act solemnly renounces, by himself and by his heirs and successors, all the right and reason to the eventual succession to the Crown of the Two Sicilies and to all the assets of the Royal House that are in Italy and elsewhere, and this according to our Laws, constitutions and Family customs, in execution of the Pragmatic Sanction of King Charles III, our Augustus ancestor, of October 6, 1759, the prescriptions of which he freely and spontaneously declares to subscribe and obey. He also declares, in particular, to renounce for himself, his heirs and successors to the assets and values existing in Italy, Vienna and Monaco (Bavaria) and destined by His Majesty King Francis II (may God have welcomed his soul), to the foundation of a majorat for the Head of the Dynasty and of the Family of the Two Sicilies and for the constitution of an endowment fund in favor of the Royal Princesses and granddaughters of our August Father King Ferdinand (may God have welcomed his soul), of marriageable age; but preserving his rights to the part of the assets that were bequeathed to him by his late uncle King Francis II, in the event that the Italian Government, which improperly retains them, makes the due restitution and the same everything that may arrive to him by other testamentary legacies.

— Cannes, December 14, 1900

This act was signed despite an official statement in the Spanish parliament (Cortes) by the minister of justice that no renunciation was necessary and if one was made it would be null and void.

Supporters of the late Infante Carlos, Duke of Calabria and his only son and heir, Prince Pedro, Duke of Calabria assert that Prince Carlo's renunciation was conditional on his actually inheriting both the Spanish and Two Sicilies crowns and/or that, even in that circumstances, such a renunciation did not include the position of grand master of the Constantinian order, which they regard as separate from the crown. When Charles III of Spain abdicated as king of Naples and Sicily after succeeding to their throne of Spain, he renounced the dignity of "primogeniture Farnese heir" and with it the grand mastership of the Constantinian Order in a separate act, ten days later. Indeed, the Act of Cannes never mentioned the order at all, although most authors argue that even if it had, its grand magistry is by nature a Farnesian family legacy that is not linked to the throne of the Two Sicilies. The Two Sicilies crown descends by semi-salic law, meaning that in the event of the extinction of the male line descended from Ferdinando II the crown would pass to the nearest princess to the last male, whereas the grand mastership of the Order would pass to the Parma line. This same point is made on official Spanish branch website, headed by Prince Pedro, which asserts that the renunciation was conditioned on facts that never arose, and that the order and the crown are governed by separate rules. Further, supporters of Infante Carlos argue that the "Act of Cannes" was legally defective and thus void. The Infante Don Carlos died on the 5 October 2015 and was succeeded by his only son, Prince Pedro, Duke of Calabria.

Supporters of Prince Carlo, Duke of Castro reject all three positions advanced by Infante Carlos' supporters, and claim that the rival claimant's ancestor validly renounced both the crown of the Two Sicilies and the grand magistry.

Each branch appoints a Catholic cardinal as grand prior. On 16 October 2012, the Vatican Secretary of State renewed its position that the Holy See does not recognise any order except the seven Papal Orders listed on their statement; this repeated a text issued by the Italian conference of Bishops which, in a note, had excluded those Orders authorised under the 1951 Italian law. The Sacred Military Constantinian Order of Saint George was included under the Italian 1951 law but was not one of those orders listed in the Vatican document. Nonetheless, the Hispano-Neapolitan Order's use of a chapel in Barcelona Cathedral has twice been confirmed by the Apostolic Penitentiary and the Hispanio-Neapolitan Order's Masses have been celebrated by the Order's Grand Prior Cardinal Gerhard Ludwig Müller in the Major Basilica of Saint Mary Major, Rome, as well as in Naples, Palermo, London, and Philadelphia, while other senior Roman Curia cardinals have also celebrated at investitures and other religious ceremonies of the Order.

=== Version led by Prince Pedro, Duke of Calabria (Hispano-Neapolitan branch) ===
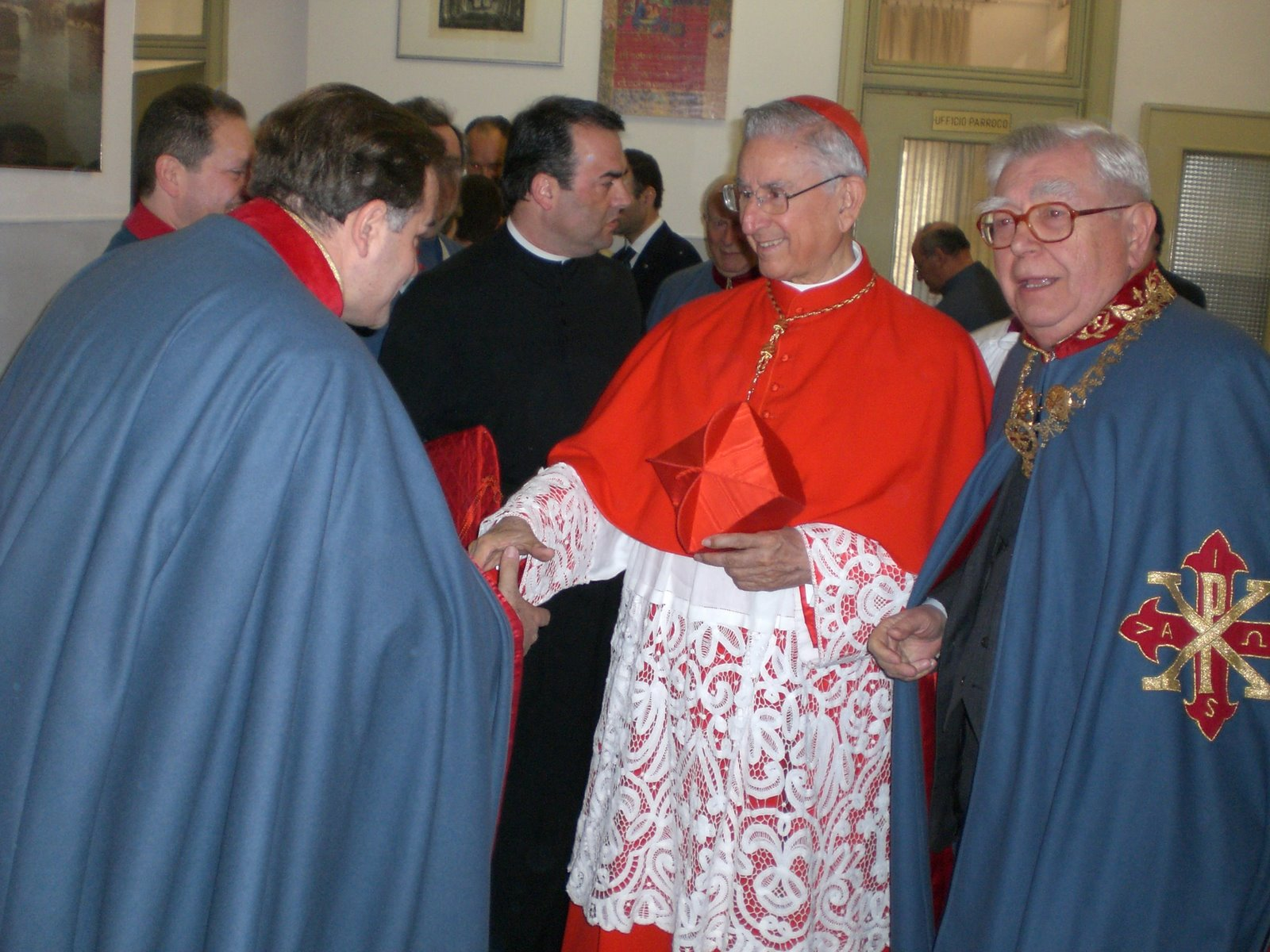
Knights of the Hispano-Neapolitan branch in the robes of the order greeting Cardinal Castrillón, 2009

Spaniards and Italians who have been granted the Constantinian Order by Infante Carlos, Duke of Calabria and his heir Prince Pedro have applied for, and received, authorisation to wear the decorations of the order.

In 1983 King Juan Carlos I instructed the head of the royal household, the Marquess of Mondéjar to request five high Spanish institutions to determine to "whom should descend the Headship of the House of Bourbon-Two Sicilies". The first of these to report was the Institute of Genealogy "Salazar y Castro" of the "Superior Council of Scientific Investigation" on 8 March 1983, followed by the Royal Academy of Jurisprudence and Legislation on 6 May 1983. The next was the Department of Protocol, Chancery and Orders of the Ministry of Foreign Affairs that reported on 1 June 1983, followed by the Division of Grandeeships and Titles of the Ministry of Justice, on 18 October 1983 that in its conclusions also included the succession to the grand mastership of the Constantinian Order in its mandate. The final and longest report, summing up the other four and detailing its own conclusions was that of the Council of State, dated 2 February 1984. The reports were then conveyed in a letter from the Marquess of Mondejar, to "S.A.R. Don Carlos de Borbón, Duque de Calabria" stating "In the interests of historical truth and with the intention of clarifying the problem of to whom corresponds the Headship of the House of Bourbon-Two Sicilies and the Grand Mastership of the Constantinian Order of St George, by order of His Majesty the King, and as Head of His Household, I have received the declarations and opinions of (then names the five institutions)... The unanimous agreement of the opinions and reports issued by the highest authorities and corporations of the Spanish State competent in the matter, recognise in the person of Your Royal Highness the title of the Headship of the House of Bourbon Two Sicilies and of the Grand Mastership of the Constantinian Order of Saint George."

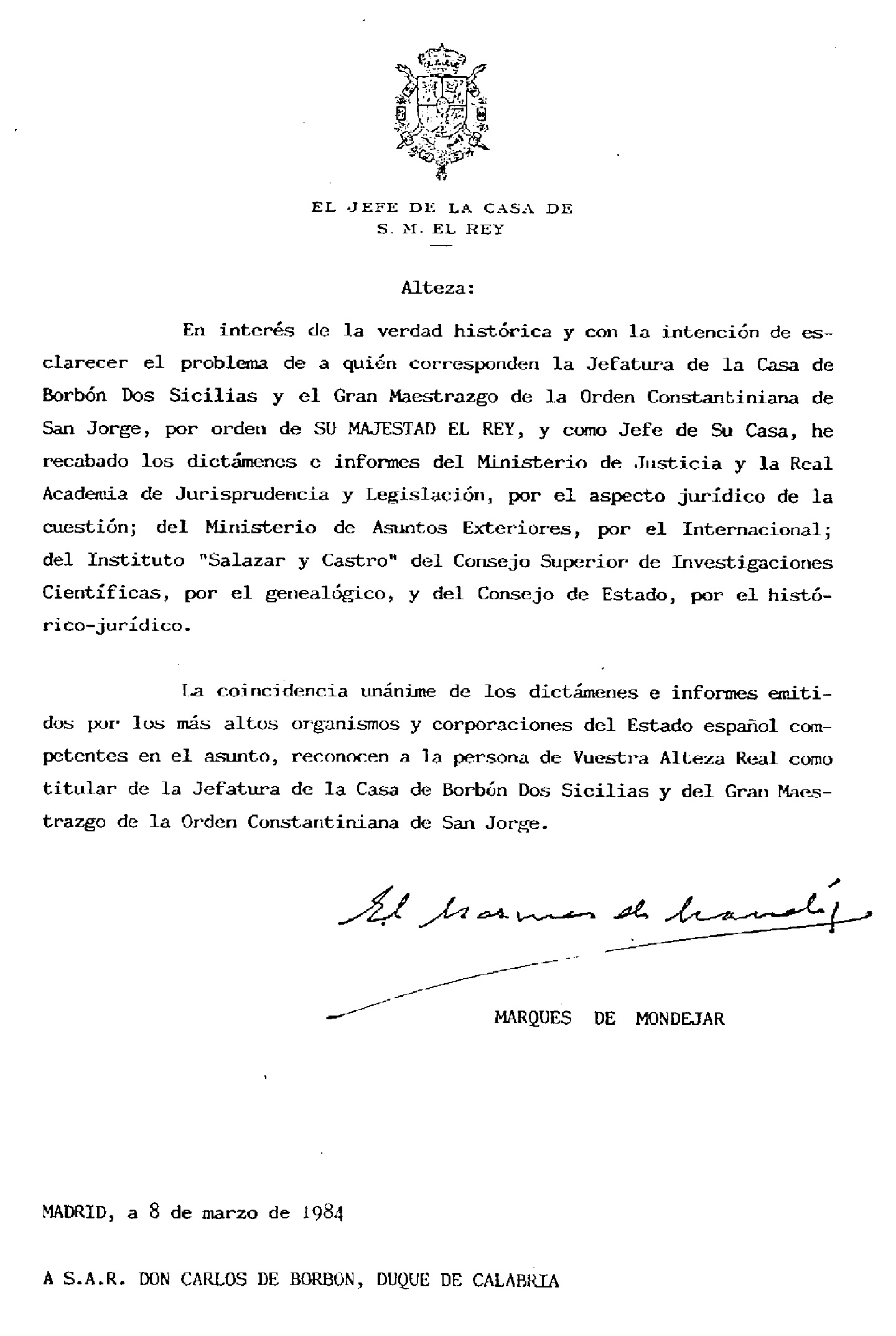
Letter from the Head of the household of the King of Spain to the late Infante (title he received in 1994) Don Carlos, Duke of Calabria, regarding his succession to the Headship of the House of Bourbon-Two Sicilies and Grand Master of the Constantinian Order

In a decree of the Spanish Ministry of Foreign Affairs by the Introductor de Embajadores, 28 November 2014, the Ministry stated that along with the Sovereign Military Order of Malta, the Equestrian Order of the Holy Sepulchre and the Royal Order of Saint Januarius (of which Prince Pedro, Duke of Calabria, is also Grand Master) "... la Sagrada y Militar Orden Constantiniana de San Jorge fueron tuteladas por la Corona de Espana o se hallan estrechamente vinculadas a su Historia, tal y como preve en este sentido el Ministerio de Defensa en su Instruccion General 06/12 sobre autorización de uso de recompensas civiles y militares." ("...the Sacred Military Constantinian Order of Saint George, came under the protection of or were linked to the Crown and history of Spain, as set forth by the Ministry of Defence in its General Instruction 06/12, on permission to wear civil and military awards"). The status of the Constantinian Order was again defined in a statement by the Introductor de Embajadores, dated 2 June 2017 and issued in Spanish, French and English - the latter read: "...Hereby Certifies That the Sacred Military Constantinian Order of Saint George and the Royal Order of Saint Januarius are officially recognized by Spain as Orders historically tied to the Crown of Spain, pursuant to the Ministry's Circular Order 4/2014 of 28 November. The use of the insignias of these two Orders is subject to the appropriate authorization, issued by the Ministry of Foreign Affairs, as stipulated by the Royal Decree of 5 June 1916, signed by the Introducer of Ambassadors, Ambassador-Secretary of the Order of Isabella the Catholic and the Order of Civil Merit." The Constantinian Order awarded by Prince Pedro is explicitly authorised to be worn by the governments of Italy and Mexico and citizens of the Netherlands have also been authorised to wear it. The United States Department of the Army has included the Order among those for which authorisation may be given to wear the decorations on the official list of such awards, under Spain.

=== Version led by Prince Carlo, Duke of Castro (Franco-Neapolitan branch) ===
In 1988, a letter dated 19 April 1987 was produced by the Neapolitan-based chancery of the Franco-Neapolitan Order that purported to be the appointment of Cardinal Giuseppe Siri as personal representative of Pope John Paul II to the Order. Soon after, another letter, dated 28 August 1985, was produced which purported to have earlier appointed Cardinal Andrzej Maria Deskur to the same post - it quickly became apparent that neither Cardinal knew anything about this and that these letters were forgeries, although the purported appointment of Cardinal Siri was published in several of the Order's publications. The then Sostituto of the Secretariat of State, Archbishop (later Cardinal) Cassidy wrote to the Nuncio in Great Britain on the 24 October 1988, stating that Cardinal Siri had not been appointed the personal representative of His Holiness, and the Nuncio in Madrid wrote Prince Don Carlos, duke of Calabria, on 31 January 1989 stating that the "pretended" autograph letter from the Pope was false. Since the Cardinal Secretary of State, Cardinal Agostiino Casaroli had written to Prince Ferdinand on 5 November 1987 to explicitly refuse the appointment of Cardinal Siri, it is difficult to understand why the claims regarding Cardinal Siri's status should have been published the following year. At the same time, another publication by the Order claimed that His Holiness had conferred the Supreme Order of Christ on Prince Ferdinand and the Libro d'Oro della Nobiltà Italiana (1988 edition) not only included the name of Cardinal Siri as personal representative of His Holiness in its listing of the royal deputation appointed by Prince Ferdinand, but stated that the then 25 year old Prince Carlo (the only son of Prince Ferdinand) had been granted the collar of the Ordine Piano, a Papal honour awarded only to heads of state (this was denied in a letter from the Nuncio in Madrid in a letter dated 29 April 1988). When asked to explain the source of this information, the editor of the Libro d'Oro (Roberto Colonello Bertini Frassoni) wrote on 5 January 1989 that it had been provided by Achille Di Lorenzo, grand chancellor of the Franco-Neapolitan Constantinian Order. In 1990 Di Lorenzo was asked to resign his post by Prince Ferdinand and two years later was expelled from the Order as a reprisal for having published a highly critical booklet attacking both Prince Ferdinand and his son. No-one has ever been publicly identified as the author of these forgeries.

Other documents circulated included the report of a supposed commission of Cardinals (mimicking the 1950s commission appointed to report on the sovereign status of the Order of Malta) which supposedly recognised Prince Ferdinand, although all the signatures of the supposed members were forged. Another letter dated 15 October 1987 distributed at the same time and supposedly from a Curia official, Archbishop, now Cardinal Giovanni Battista Re, also stated that Prince Ferdinand was the grand a master and Di Lorenzo the grand chancellor; this letter was subsequently denounced by Re as a forgery and Cardinal Re has since become a member of the Spanish Order, several times celebrating Masses of the Order.

In the 1990s, under the authority of Prince Carlo, Duke of Castro, the organization and activities of his version of the order were "revived" as the so-called "Delegation for Great Britain and Ireland of the Sacred Military Constantinian Order of Saint George". This version of the Order was formerly led by a British Catholic public relations advisor as its "magistral delegate", and has awarded him other honours. In August 2016, the Vice-Grand Chancellor of the Hispano-Neapolitan branch, Guy Stair Sainty stated that the order headed by Prince Pedro had no connection with this PR advisor, nor with his business activities, nor with the order of which he is described as “delegate”.

Italian citizens who have received the Constantinian Order from Prince Carlo, Duke of Castro may apply to the Italian ministry of foreign affairs for authorisation to wear the insignia.

In 2011, the version of the Constantinian Order headed by the Duke of Castro, became one of the 4000+ (as of 2022) NGO's. In 2011-12 some 600 organizations applied for consultative status. On average between 100 and 150 applications are recommended by the Committee in each of its two sessions per year non-governmental organizations to hold consultative status at the Economic and Social Council at the United Nations. The United Nations recognises the organisation as qualifying for this status without acknowledging its historical claims or any particular character as an Order of knighthood.

In 2016, the branch of the Order led by the Duke of Castro was involved in controversy over the election of Patricia Scotland as Commonwealth Secretary-General. It was alleged that Scotland used the Order's awards to influence votes in her favour through reciprocal exchanges of honours. Investigations resulted in a knighthood granted to the Duke of Castro by the Governor General of Antigua being revoked.

=== Attempted reconciliation ===
On 24 January 2014, the day before the Blessed Beatification of the Venerable Servant of God Princess Maria Cristina of Savoy (later Queen Maria Cristina, Queen Consort of the Two Sicilies), the two disputed heads of the house: Prince Pedro, Duke of Noto (on behalf of his father Prince Carlos, Duke of Calabria) and Prince Carlo, Duke of Castro signed an "Act of Reconciliation" at Naples' Excelsior Hotel.

This act appeared to have ended the longstanding differences over the titles used by the two branches of the House of the Two Sicilies. The signing of the act of reconciliation was done in the presence of the Duchesses of Noto and Castro, the Duke of Noto's mother, the Duchess of Calabria, the Duke of Noto's sisters, Maria and Inés, and their husbands, Archduke Simeon and Michele Carrelli Palombi, their aunt, Princess Teresa, Marchioness of Laserna, the Duke of Castro's sister, Princess Napoleon, Prince Casimiro of Bourbon-Two Sicilies and his wife Princess Margherita, and the Duke of Braganza. Owing to his state of health, the Infante Don Carlos, Duke of Calabria was unable to attend the ceremony.

The Act stated that the two branches will recognize each other's titles for the present holders and their successors; the titles of the senior, Spanish line, being Duke of Calabria, Duke of Noto and Duke of Capua, and of the junior line, being Duke of Castro and Duchess of Palermo and Duchess of Capri which were accorded to the Duke and Duchess of Castro's two daughters. The final intention was to work towards a future where the two branches might co-operate together (although the revival of the Order of Francis I has never been accepted by the senior, Spanish line.)

=== Renewed schism ===
In May 2016 Prince Carlo unilaterally renounced the agreement and subsequently conferred the titles of Duchess of Calabria and Duchess of Noto on his daughters, declaring the former to be the heiress to the headship of the Royal House and the Constantinian Grand Mastership. This act has not been recognised by members of the branch descended from Prince Gabriel of Bourbon-Two Sicilies. The legality of this has been disputed by Prince Pedro on the grounds that the succession to the Two Sicilies crown was established in two international treaties (Vienna 1737 and Naples 1759) as well as the Pragmatic Decree of 1759 and the nineteenth century Two Sicilies constitutions and therefore could not be changed by a unilateral act, even by an undisputed head of the royal house. The succession to the Constantinian Grand Mastership was confirmed by an Imperial Bull and a Papal Brief, and by the Bull Militantis Ecclesiae, and required that the Grand Mastership, an ecclesiastical office in canon law, could only be held by males and must pass by primogeniture to the heirs of the House of Farnese; the purported change to the succession by Prince Carlo has not been approved by the Holy See.

== Ranks of the Order ==
=== Grades ===
In the 18th century, the order was divided into Knights Grand Cross, Knights of Justice (nobles with four quarters of nobility), Donats (nobles with less than four quarters), Priests, Knights of Grace (commoners) and Esquires/Servants of Office. Later, it was divided in the three classes of Justice (old nobility), Grace (new nobility), and Merit (commoners). The addition by Prince Carlo, Duke of Castro, of a series of ranks awarded for merit represents a fundamental change of the nature of the Order from the religious military order which had benefited from numerous signs of Papal approval and support, in bulls, briefs, decrees and monitors, to a simple merit award. This was earlier demonstrated in a communication from Prince Klemens von Metternich to Count Francis Magawly, prime minister of the duchy of Parma, in which Metternich pointed out that invention of new ranks and titles in the Parma Order meant that it was a simple merit award, with no claim to any connection with the historic Order flourishing in Naples.

==== Hispano-Neapolitan branch ====
The name Grace was changed to Jure Sanguinis by Infante Alfonso, Duke of Calabria, when Grand Master.

- Bailiff Knight Grand Cross of Justice
- Knight Grand Cross of Justice
- Knight Grand Cross Jure Sanguinis
- Knight Grand Cross of Merit
- Knight of Justice
- Knight Jure Sanguinis
- Knight of Merit
- Knight of Office (cross of merit)
- Chaplain

==== Franco-Neapolitan branch ====
===== Special Class =====
- Sovereign Knight Grand Cross with Collar
- Knight Grand Cross, Special Class

===== Justice =====
- Bailiff Knight Grand Cross of Justice with Collar
- Bailiff Knight Grand Cross of Justice
- Knight/Dame Grand Cross of Justice
- Knight/Dame Grand Officer of Justice
- Knight/Dame Commander of Justice, jus patronatus
- Knight/Dame Commander of Justice
- Knight/Dame of Justice

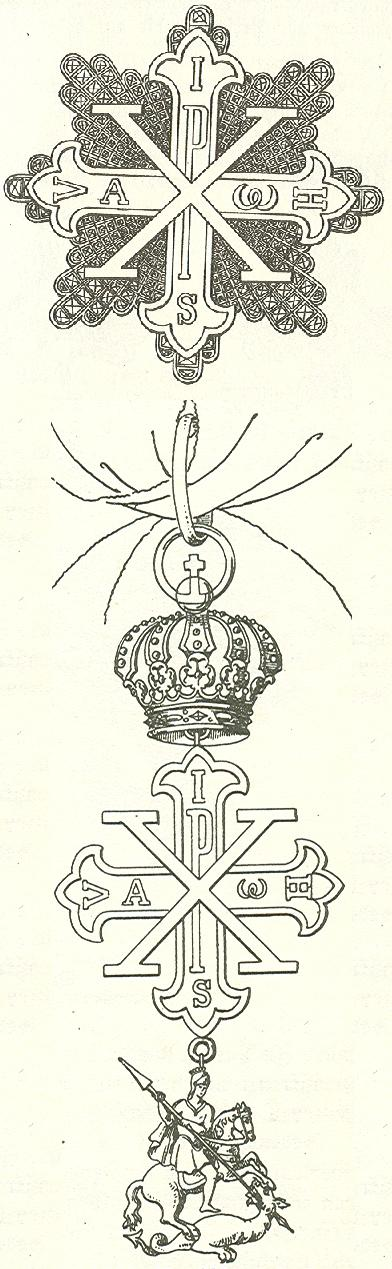
Lithography of the breast star and Grand Cross (for Bailiffs) of the order, 1893

===== Grace =====
- Knight/Dame Grand Cross of Grace, or Jure Sanguinis
- Knight/Dame Grand Officer of Grace
- Knight/Dame Commander of Grace, jus patronatus
- Knight/Dame Commander of Grace
- Knight/Dame of Grace or Jure Sanguinis

===== Merit =====
- Knight/Dame Grand Cross of Merit
- Knight/Dame Grand Officer of Merit, Special Class
- Knight/Dame Grand Officer of Merit
- Knight/Dame Commander of Merit, jus patronatus
- Knight/Dame Commander of Merit
- Knight/Dame of Merit
- Knight/Dame of Office

===== Medal =====
- Gold, silver or bronze
- Special Class
- 1st Class
- 2nd Class

Insignia
Collar	Knight sash	Dame ribbon

Ribbon bars
Justice Grand Cross	Grace Grand Cross	Merit Grand Cross	Knight/Dame of Office	Medal

==== Parma branch ====
- Senator Grand Cross with Collar
- Senator Grand Cross
- Knight/Dame Commander
- Knight/Dame 1st class
- Knight/Dame 2st class

=== Recipients ===
Bailiffs Grand Cross

- Emperor Napoleon II
- Emperor Franz Joseph I of Austria
- Emperor Pedro II of Brazil
- Tsar Alexander II of Russia
- Tsar Ferdinand I of Bulgaria
- King Paul of Greece
- King Constantine II of Greece
- King Juan Carlos I
- King Boris III of Bulgaria
- King Letsie III
- Simeon Saxe-Coburg-Gotha, former King of Bulgaria
- Archduke Simeon von Habsburg
- Archduke Johannes of Austria
- Archduke Ludwig of Austria
- Archduke Josef Karl of Austria
- Crown Prince Otto von Habsburg
- Alexander, Crown Prince of Yugoslavia
- Vittorio Emanuele, Prince of Naples
- Emanuele Filiberto of Savoy, Prince of Venice
- Prince Gabriel of Bourbon-Two Sicilies
- Prince Georg of Bavaria
- Leopold II, Grand Duke of Tuscany
- Robert Hugo, Duke of Parma
- Duarte Nuno, Duke of Braganza
- Duarte Pio, Duke of Braganza
- Infante Henrique of Portugal, Duke of Coimbra
- Prince Carlos, Duke of Parma
- Infante Jaime, Duke of Segovia
- Eduard, Prince of Anhalt
- Alfonso, Duke of Anjou and Cádiz
- Carl, Duke of Württemberg
- Prince Franz Wilhelm of Prussia
- Friedrich Wilhelm, Prince of Hohenzollern
- Prince Johann Georg of Hohenzollern
- Prince Rupert Loewenstein
- Carlos Fitz-James Stuart, 19th Duke of Alba
- Jean, Count of Paris
- Fra' Giacomo dalla Torre del Tempio di Sanguinetto, Prince and Grand Master of the Order of Malta
- Count Andrzej Ciechanowiecki
- Cardinal Gilberto Agustoni
- Cardinal Angelo Bagnasco
- Cardinal William Wakefield Baum
- Cardinal Anthony Bevilacqua
- Cardinal Giacomo Biffi
- Cardinal Carlo Caffarra
- Cardinal Antonio Cañizares Llovera
- Cardinal Darío Castrillón Hoyos
- Cardinal Fernando Cento
- Cardinal Giovanni Cheli
- Cardinal Dominik Duka
- Cardinal Willem Jacobus Eijk
- Cardinal Józef Glemp
- Cardinal Zenon Grocholewski
- Cardinal James Michael Harvey
- Cardinal Antonio Innocenti
- Cardinal Andrea Cordero Lanza di Montezemolo
- Cardinal Gerhard Ludwig Müller
- Cardinal Vincent Nichols
- Cardinal Pietro Palazzini
- Cardinal George Pell
- Cardinal Giovanni Battista Re
- Cardinal Gianfranco Ravasi
- Cardinal Carlos Osoro Sierra
- Cardinal Jean-Claude Hollerich
- Cardinal Dominique Mamberti
- Cardinal Arcadio Larraona Saralegui
- Cardinal Eduardo Martínez Somalo
- Cardinal Antonio María Rouco Varela
- Cardinal Carlos Amigo Vallejo
- Fra' Andrew Bertie, Prince and Grand Master of the Order of Malta
- Prince Dominique de La Rochefoucauld-Montbel
- Archbishop Antonio Mennini
- Archbishop J. Michael Miller
- Archbishop Gabriel Montalvo Higuera
- Archbishop George Stack
- Vicente de Cadenas y Vicent, Cronista Rey de Armas
- Guy Stair Sainty, Grand Chancellor

Dames Grand Cross of Justice

- Queen Isabella II of Spain
- Queen Sofía of Spain
- Queen Maria Theresa of Austria (1816–1867)
- Frederica of Hanover, Queen of Greece
- Victoria Eugenie of Battenberg, Queen of Spain
- Charlotte, Grand Duchess of Luxembourg
- Grand Duchess Leonida Georgievna Romanova of Russia
- Infanta Alicia, Duchess of Calabria
- Infanta Margarita, Duchess of Soria
- Infanta Pilar, Duchess of Badajoz
- Princess Anne, Duchess of Calabria
- Princess Beatrice of Saxe-Coburg and Gotha
- Cayetana Fitz-James Stuart, 18th Duchess of Alba
- Princess Irene of Greece and Denmark
- Princess Michael of Kent
- Princess Béatrice of Bourbon-Two Sicilies
- Princess Maria Antonia of the Two Sicilies
- Princess Isabel Alfonsa of Bourbon-Two Sicilies
- Princess Marie des Neiges of Bourbon-Parma
- Princess María de los Dolores of Bourbon-Two Sicilies
- Princess María de la Esperanza of Bourbon-Two Sicilies
- Princess Maria di Grazia of Bourbon-Two Sicilies
- Princess Maria Ludwiga Theresia of Bavaria
- Princess María de las Mercedes of Bourbon-Two Sicilies
- Princess Urraca of Bourbon-Two Sicilies
- Princess Maria Adelaide of Savoy-Genoa
- Dame Cécile La Grenade
- María Clemencia Rodríguez Múnera, former First Lady of Colombia

Dames Grand Cross of Merit

- Ambassador Barbara Tuge-Erecińska
- Marta Linares de Martinelli
- Mary McAleese, President of Ireland
- Mireya Moscoso, President of Panama

Dame Grand Officer of Justice

- Georgina Fitzalan-Howard, Duchess of Norfolk
- Camilla von Habsburg-Lothringen

Knights Grand Cross of Justice

- Prince Adalbert of Bavaria (1886–1970)
- Prince Seeiso of Lesotho
- Prince Pedro Carlos of Orléans-Braganza
- Prince Pedro Gastão of Orléans-Braganza
- Emanuele Filiberto of Savoy, Prince of Venice
- Archduke Franz Karl of Austria
- Archduke Friedrich, Duke of Teschen
- Archduke Albrecht, Duke of Teschen
- Archduke Rudolf of Austria (1919–2010)
- Rudolf, Crown Prince of Austria
- Archduke Stephen of Austria
- Ernest Louis, Grand Duke of Hesse
- Grand Duke Vladimir Kirillovich of Russia
- Infante Alfonso, Duke of Galliera
- Prince Eugenio, Duke of Genoa
- Prince Ferdinand, Duke of Castro
- Georg, Duke of Hohenberg
- Carlo Emanuele Ruspoli, 3rd Duke of Morignano
- Afonso, Prince of Beira
- Prince Laurent of Belgium
- Leopold, Prince of Salerno
- Albert, 12th Prince of Thurn and Taxis
- Prince Louis, Count of Trani
- Alfred I, Prince of Windisch-Grätz
- Vittorio Emanuele, Prince of Naples
- William Albert, 1st Prince of Montenuovo
- Prince Klemens von Metternich
- Count Agostino Borromeo
- Count Christopher de Paus
- Count Géraud Michel de Pierredon
- John de Salis, 9th Count de Salis-Soglio
- Carlos Gereda y de Borbón, Marquis of Almazán
- Sir Conrad Swan
- Cardinal Desmond Connell
- Cardinal Timothy M. Dolan
- Cardinal Edoardo Menichelli
- Cardinal Cormac Murphy-O'Connor
- Cardinal Mario Nasalli Rocca di Corneliano
- Cardinal Giuseppe Pizzardo
- Cardinal Luigi Poggi
- Cardinal Ugo Poletti
- Cardinal Norberto Rivera Carrera
- Cardinal Luigi Traglia
- Cardinal Augusto Vargas Alzamora
- Cardinal Thomas Winning

Knights Grand Cross of Merit

- Justice Samuel Alito, United States Supreme Court Justice
- Carlos Abascal
- János Áder, President of Hungary
- Bertie Ahern, Taoiseach of Ireland
- John Bruton, Taoiseach of Ireland
- Senator Salvatore Cuffaro
- Arnaldo Forlani, former Prime Minister of Italy
- Giustino Fortunato (1777–1862), Prime Minister of the Two Sicilies
- Nicholas Liverpool, President of Dominica
- Colonel Elmar Mäder
- Ricardo Martinelli, President of Panama
- Dr Joaquín Navarro-Valls
- Abel Pacheco, President of Costa Rica
- Juan Manuel Santos, President of Colombia
- José Sarney, President of Brazil
- Charles Savarin, President of Dominica
- Cardinal Gianfranco Ravasi
- Bishop Fernando Arêas Rifan
- Monsignor Marcelo Sánchez Sorondo
- Archbishop Giovanni Tonucci

Knight Commanders of Justice

- Alfredo Acton, 1st Baron Acton
- Professor Mark Watson-Gandy
- Charles Guthrie, Baron Guthrie of Craigiebank
- Sir Nicholas Mander
- Charles Stourton, 26th Baron Mowbray
- Evan Morgan, 2nd Viscount Tredegar

Knights of Merit

- Senator Gabriele Albertini
- David Alton, Baron Alton of Liverpool
- Giulio Andreotti, Prime Minister of Italy
- Counsellor Matthäus Casimir von Collin
- Professor Erich Feigl
- Gino Lupini
- Professor Vincent McBrierty
- Paul Murphy, Baron Murphy of Torfaen
- Ambassador Nicolae Petrescu-Comnen
- Professor Giuseppe Resnati
- Heinrich VII, Prince Reuss of Köstritz
- Enrico Salati, Chief Minister of Parma
- Monsignor Thomas Adamson
- Archbishop Bernard Barsi
- Monsignor John D. Faris

Grand Priors

- Cardinal Gerhard Ludwig Müller
- Cardinal Darío Castrillón Hoyos
- Cardinal Antonio Innocenti
- Cardinal Domenico Pignatelli di Belmonte
- Cardinal Renato Martino
- Cardinal Mario Francesco Pompedda
- Cardinal Albert Vanhoye

== See also ==
- Order of Saint Januarius
- Order of Saint Ferdinand and of Merit
- Order of Saint George and Reunion
- Royal Order of Francis I

== Bibliography ==
- España, Gobierno de (1987). Informes Emitidos por Ministerio de Justicia, Real Academia de Jurisprudencia y Legislación, Ministerio de Asuntos Exteriores, Instituto "Salazar y Castro" (C.S.I.C.) y Consejo de Estado Relativos al Título de Jefe de la Casa Real de Borbón Dos Sicilias y al Gran Maestrazgo de la Sagrada Militar Orden Constantiniana de San Jorge. Gráficas Arias Montano, Móstoles.
- Lecanda Crooke, Íñigo (2012). "Análisis jurídico de la legitimidad en la Jefatura de la Casa Real de Borbón Dos-Sicilias y el Gran Maestrazgo de sus Órdenes" (PDF). Anales de la Real Academia Matritense de Heráldica y Genealogía. Real Academia Matritense de Heráldica y Genealogía.
- Stair Sainty, Guy (2018). The Constantinian Order of Saint George. Boletín Oficial del Estado. ISBN 978-84-340-2506-6.
- de Palacio, José María (1964). La Maison Royale des Deux Siciles, l'Ordre Constantinien de Saint Georges et l'Ordre de Saint Janvier. Altamira Talleres Gráficos.
