= Retuerta del Bullaque =

Coordinates: 39°27′0″N 4°24′0″W

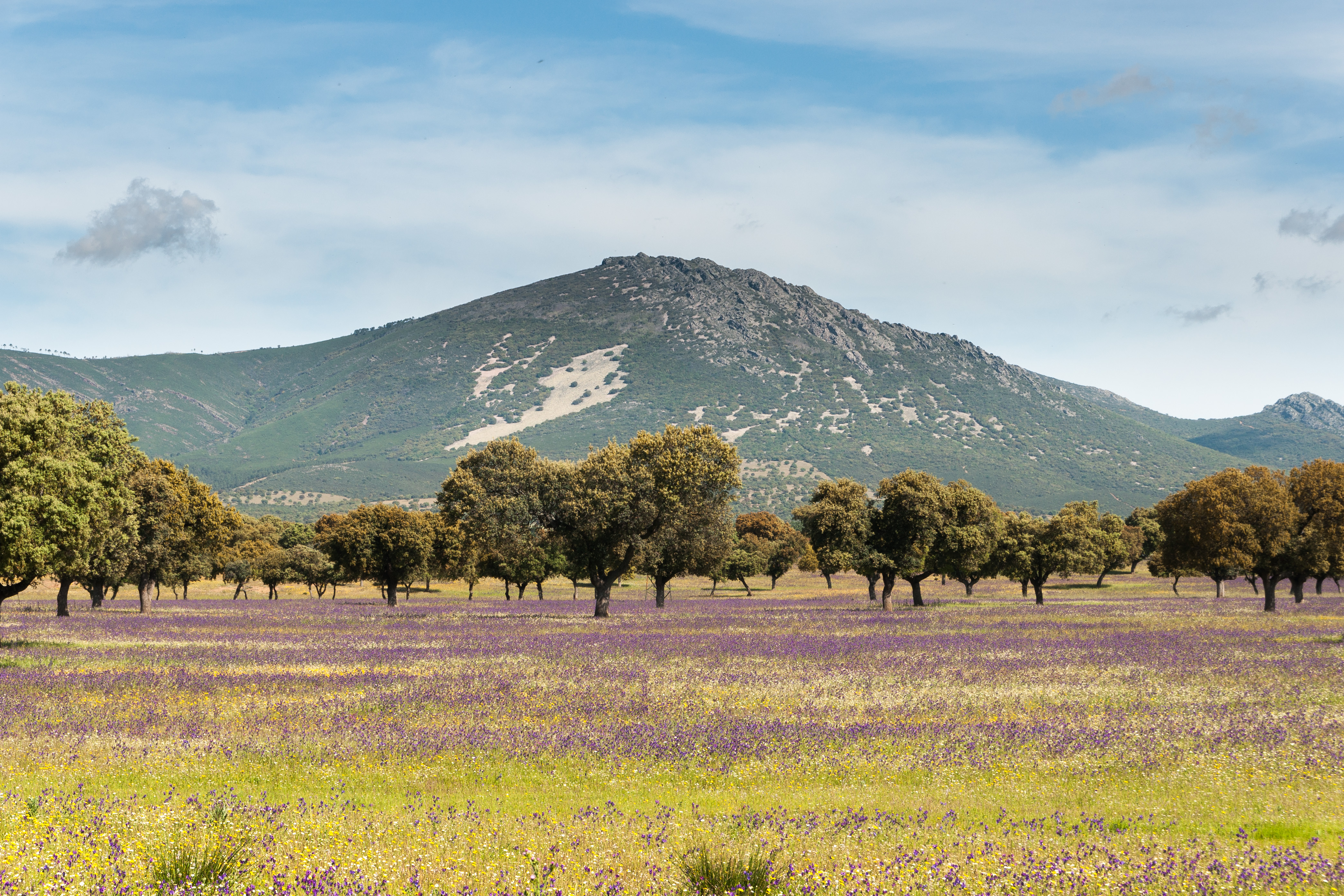

Coat of arms of Retuerta del Bullaque

Retuerta del Bullaque is a municipality in Ciudad Real Province, Castile-La Mancha, Spain. It has a population of 1,033.
