= Princess Anne, Duchess of Calabria =

Princess Anne
- Dowager Duchess of Calabria
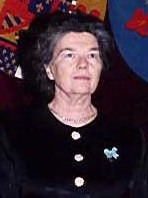
- At a Mass of the Constantinian Order in Barcelona
- Born: 4 December 1938 (age 87); Woluwe-Saint-Pierre, Belgium
- Spouse: Infante Carlos, Duke of Calabria (m. 1965; died 2015)
- Issue: Princess Cristina; María, Archduchess Simeon of Austria; Prince Pedro, Duke of Calabria; Princess Inés; Princess Victoria
Names
- Anne Marguerite Brigitte Marie
- House: Orléans
- Father: Prince Henri, Count of Paris
- Mother: Princess Isabelle of Orléans-Braganza

Princess Anne of Bourbon-Two Sicilies, Dowager Duchess of Calabria (Anne Marguerite Brigitte Marie; born 4 December 1938), born Princess Anne of Orléans, is the widow of Infante Carlos, Duke of Calabria. She is the third daughter and fifth child of Henri, Count of Paris, Orléanist claimant to the defunct French throne, and Princess Isabelle of Orléans-Braganza.

== Biography ==
Princess Anne of Orléans was born on 4 December 1938 at Woluwe-Saint-Pierre, Belgium, to Henri, Count of Paris, claimant to the French throne, and Princess Isabelle of Orléans-Braganza. At the time, the family was residing at Manoir d'Anjou, a 15-hectare estate in the Belgian town. In 1950, the law banning claimants to the French throne from residing in the country was rescinded and the family moved back to France.

Since her marriage, Princess Anne has accompanied her husband, and now son, on official engagements on behalf of the Sacred Military Constantinian Order of Saint George. Due to the close friendship and familial relationship between her husband and King Juan Carlos, Princess Anne and her husband were viewed as extended members of the Spanish royal family. They were often first in the procession of the royal family at large family events, such as the wedding of Felipe, Prince of Asturias, and Doña Letizia Ortiz y Rocasolano.

The Duchess of Calabria occasionally undertakes official engagements on behalf of the Spanish monarchy. On 28 June 2015, the Duchess delivered the combat flag to the Spanish frigate Blas de Lezo (F103) in Getxo.

== Marriage and issue ==
Princess Anne became romantically involved with Prince Carlos, Duke of Noto, son and heir of Infante Alfonso, Duke of Calabria, whom she had known since childhood, at the wedding of the future King Juan Carlos I of Spain and Princess Sophia of Greece and Denmark in Athens in 1962. The Count of Paris initially withheld his consent to the match as he supported the claim of Prince Ranieri, Duke of Castro to the defunct throne of the Kingdom of the Two Sicilies. Eventually, after years of waiting and the death of Prince Carlos's father, the Count of Paris relented and the engagement was announced. The 250 guests received one of two different invitations from either the bride's parents or the groom's; the former referred to the bride's marriage to "HRH Prince Carlos of Bourbon," while the latter announced the wedding of "Princess Anne of France" to the "Duke of Calabria."

On 11 May 1965, the couple was married in a civil ceremony in Louveciennes. The following day, on 12 May, the religious marriage was held at the Chapelle royale de Dreux, the traditional marriage and burial place of the House of Orléans. The press dubbed them the "lovers of the Gotha." The bride wore a Balmain silk gown of Lyonnaise lace, embroidered with fleur-de-lis, a symbol of the Capetian dynasty. The Duke and Duchess of Calabria made their home in Spain. They remained married for 50 years until the Duke's death on 5 October 2015. Anne was titled HRH The Dowager Duchess of Calabria only after the death of her mother-in-law, Infanta Alicia, Duchess of Calabria, in 2017; from 2015 to 2017 she was officially addressed as HRH Infanta Anne, Duchess of Calabria.

The Duke and Duchess of Calabria had five children:

- Princess Cristina of Bourbon-Two Sicilies (born 15 March 1966 in Madrid), married Pedro López-Quesada y Fernández-Urrutia on 15 July 1994 in Ciudad Real. They have two children.
- Princess María of Bourbon-Two Sicilies (born 5 April 1967 in Madrid), married Archduke Simeon of Austria (born 29 June 1958 in Katana), son of Archduke Rudolf of Austria and Countess Xenia Czernichev-Besobrasov, on 13 July 1996 in La Toledana. They have five children.
- Prince Pedro of Bourbon-Two Sicilies, Duke of Calabria (born 16 October 1968 in Madrid), married Sofía Landaluce y Melgarejo (born 23 November 1973 in Madrid) on 30 March 2001 in Madrid. They have seven children.
- Princess Inès of Bourbon-Two Sicilies (born 20 April 1971 in Madrid), married Nobile Michele Carrelli Palombi dei Marchesi di Raiano (born 17 September 1965 in Rome) on 13 October 2001 in Toledo. They have two daughters.
- Princess Victoria of Bourbon-Two Sicilies (born 24 May 1976 in Madrid), married Markos Nomikos (born 29 October 1965 in Kifissia) on 27 September 2003. They have four children.

== Honours ==
- House of Bourbon-Two Sicilies: Dame Grand Cross of Justice of the Sacred Military Constantinian Order of Saint George
- Holy See: Dame Grand Cross of the Equestrian Order of the Holy Sepulchre of Jerusalem, 24 November 2018

=== Arms ===
Heraldry of Princess Anne

Coat of arms used as Princess of the House of Orléans
(1938–1965)

Coat of arms used as Duchess of Calabria
(1965–2015)

Coat of arms used as Dowager Duchess
(since 2015)

== Ancestors ==
Ancestors of Princess Anne, Duchess of Calabria

8. Prince Robert, Duke of Chartres
4. Prince Jean, Duke of Guise
9. Princess Françoise of Orléans
2. Prince Henri, Count of Paris
10. Prince Philippe, Count of Paris
5. Princess Isabelle of Orléans
11. Princess Marie Isabelle of Orléans
1. Princess Anne, Duchess of Calabria
12. Prince Gaston, Count of Eu
6. Pedro de Alcântara, Prince of Grão-Pará
13. Isabel, Princess Imperial of Brazil
3. Princess Isabelle of Orléans-Braganza
14. Johann Wenzel II, Count Dobrzensky of Dobrzenicz
7. Countess Elisabeth Dobrzensky of Dobrzenicz
15. Countess Elisabeth Kottulinsky of Kottulin-Krzizkowitz
