= Orders, decorations, and medals of Italy =

Prizes from the Italian Government

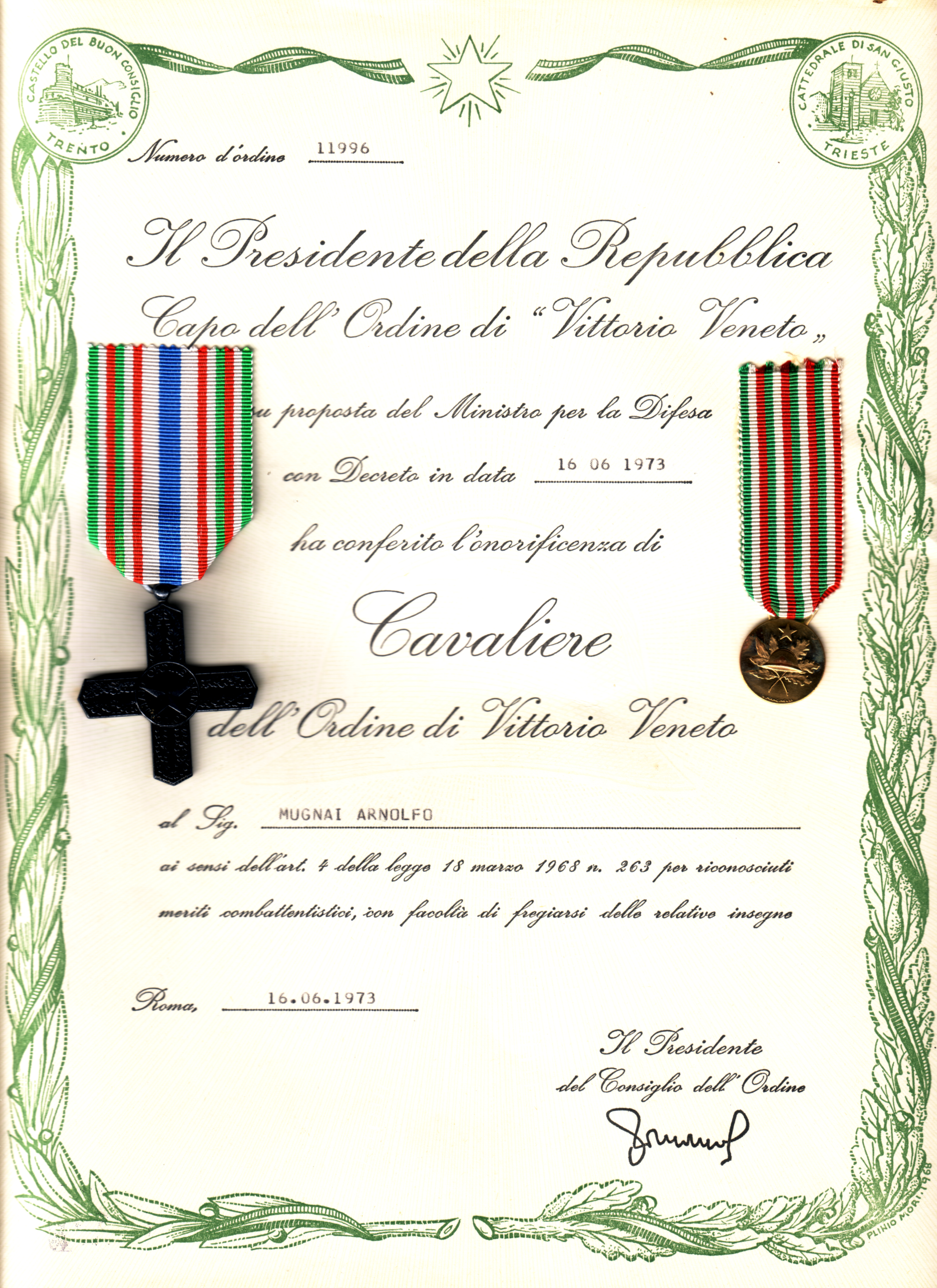
Letters patent of a Knight of the Order of Vittorio Veneto, shown with badge and miniature

The Italian honours system is a means to reward achievements or service to the Italian Republic, formerly the Kingdom of Italy, including the Italian Social Republic.

== Orders of chivalry ==
=== Italian Republic ===
There are five orders of knighthood awarded in recognition of service to the Italian Republic. Below these sit a number of other decorations, associated and otherwise, that do not confer knighthoods. The degrees of knighthood, not all of which apply to all orders, are Knight (Cavaliere abbreviated Cav.), Officer (Ufficiale abbreviated Uff.), Commander (Commendatore abbr. Comm.), Grand Officer (Grand'Ufficiale, abbr. Gr. Uff.), Knight Grand Cross (Cavaliere di Gran Croce, abbr. Cav. Gr. Croce) and Knight Grand Cross with cordon (Cavaliere di Gran Croce con cordone).

Italian citizens may not use within the territory of the Republic honours or distinctions conferred on them by non-national orders or foreign states, unless authorised by Ministry of Foreign Affairs. The use of awards of the Holy See (including the Equestrian Order of the Holy Sepulchre) is to be authorized by Presidency of the Council of Ministers, while the use of those of the Sovereign Military Order of Malta, enjoying formal recognition in Italy, do not need any authorization to boast.

The Royal House of Savoy, Italy's former Royal Family, also continues to bestow knighthoods in three orders of chivalry previously recognised by the Kingdom of Italy. In fact, Umberto II, the last King of Italy did not abdicate, and so he preserved his fons honorum: today the Grand Mastership of the orders remain under the prerogatives of Head of the House of Savoy, claimed between Emanuele Filiberto, Prince of Venice and Aimone, Duke of Aosta. Today these continue merely as dynastic orders of the Royal House in exile. While their bestowal is suppressed by law in Italy, the use of those decorations conferred prior to 1951 is recognised, exclusive of any right of precedence in official ceremonies. However the Savoy orders, are theoretically recognized by the Holy See amongst others, for example the Order of Saints Maurice and Lazarus were recognized by papal bull of Pope Gregory XIII, where he bestowed upon Emmanuel Philibert, Duke of Savoy and his Savoy successors, the right to confer this knighthood in perpetuity.

The House of Bourbon-Two Sicilies from the Kingdom of the Two Sicilies additionally continues to bestow knighthoods, including the Sacred Military Constantinian Order of Saint George which is fully recognised by the Italian republic. Also the Houses of Bourbon-Parma and Habsburg-Tuscany continues to do so.

Order of Merit of the Italian Republic
The Ordine al Merito della Repubblica Italiana (OMRI), instituted in 1951, is the highest ranking honour and most senior order of the Republic. It is awarded in five degrees for "merit acquired by the nation" in the fields of literature, the arts, economy, public service, and social, philanthropic and humanitarian activities and for long and conspicuous service in civilian and military careers. Save in exceptional circumstances, no one may be awarded a rank higher than Knight in the first instance. Three well-known exceptions are for the musician Luciano Pavarotti, who was first awarded a Commander in 1976, Erol Gelenbe the Turkish and French Computer Scientist who was awarded a Commander in 2005, and the Conductor Claudio Abbado, who was awarded a Knight Grand Cross in 1984.

Investiture normally takes place on 2 June, the anniversary of the foundation of the Republic (celebrated in Italy as Festa della Repubblica) and on 27 December, the anniversary of the promulgation of the Italian Constitution. The badge bears the inscription Al Merito della Repubblica encircling the national emblem on the obverse and Patriae Unitati and Civium Libertati encircling the head of Italia Turrita on the reverse. The order is bestowed by decree of the President of the Italian Republic, as head of the orders of knighthood, on the recommendation of the President of the Council of Ministers.

Military Order of Italy
The Ordine Militare d'Italia, until 1947 the Military Order of Savoy (1815), (Note: Founded by Letters Patent dated 14 August 1815, renewed by Royal Decree on 27 September 1855 and 28 March 1857.) is awarded for distinguished wartime conduct of individual personnel (or units of the armed forces) that have "proven expertise, sense of responsibility and valour." The lowest of its five degrees may also be awarded for peacetime actions. Recipients of the Ordine Militare di Savoia were transferred and retain their existing insignia and seniority. (Note: Under Legislative Decree of the Provisional Head of State No. 15 of 2 June 1947, renewed by Law No. 199 of 27 March 1952.) The badge bears the inscription Al Merito Militare—1855; the Savoy cross and letters V.E. substituted with R.I. and 1947, the date of the promulgation of the constitution.

The order is bestowed by decree of the President of the Republic, head of the order, on the recommendation of the Minister of Defence. Today there are just 14 living recipients. The associated Medal of Military Valour, established in 1932, is subdivided into gold, silver and bronze categories.

Order of Merit for Labour
The Ordine al Merito del Lavoro is awarded to those "who have been singularly meritorious" in agriculture, commerce and industry. It was first instituted by Royal Decree on 9 May 1901, replacing the Ordine Cavalleresco al Merito Agrario, Industriale e Commerciale which had been created by Royal Decree on 1 March 1898. (Note: Revived by Law No. 199 of 27 March 1952.) The order is open to all Italians, at home and overseas. Each year, on 1 June 25 new Knights of Labour are invested. The badge bears the inscription Al Merito del Lavoro—1901.

The order is bestowed by decree of the President of the Republic, head of the order, on the recommendation of the Minister of Economic Development (successor to the Minister of Industry, Commerce and Craftsmanship). The associated Star of Merit for Labour, established in 1923, (Note: Established by Royal Decree No. 3167 of 30 December 1923, renewed by Law No. 316(1) of 1 March 1967.) confers the title of Master of Labour.

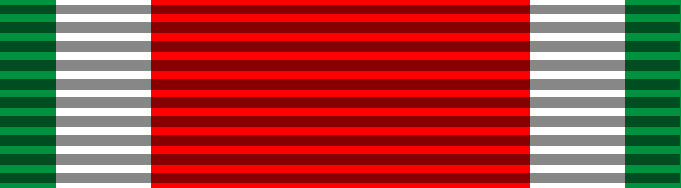

Order of the Star of Italy
The Ordine della Stella d'Italia (OSI) was originally instituted in 1947 as the Order of the Star of Italian Solidarity, to recognise those expatriates and foreigners who made an outstanding contribution to the reconstruction of Italy after World War II. (Note: Instituted by Decree Law of the Provisional Head of State No. 703 of 27 January 1947, amended by Decree Law No. 812 of 9 March 1948.) The badge bears the inscription Solidarietà Italiana encircling a depiction of the Good Samaritan. The order is bestowed in three degrees by decree of the President of the Republic, head of the order, on the recommendation of the Minister of Foreign Affairs. In 2011, it was reformed and the emphasis shifted to the preservation and promotion of national prestige abroad.

Order of Vittorio Veneto
The Ordine di Vittorio Veneto was instituted with a single rank of Knight in 1968, "to express the gratitude of the nation" to those decorated with the Cross of War who had fought for at least six months in World War I and earlier conflicts. (Note: Instituted by Law No. 263 of 18 March 1968.) A small annuity was granted in favour of those recipients who did not enjoy an income above their tax allowance. The order was bestowed by decree of the President of the Republic, head of the order, on the recommendation of the Minister of Defence. Lying dormant, it was formally abolished in 2010.

=== The Kingdom of Italy ===
The Sardinian orders of the Most Holy Annunciation, of Saints Maurice and Lazarus and the Military and Civil orders of Savoy were continued on the unification of Italy in 1861. These were augmented during the Liberal period by the Order of the Crown of Italy, the Chivalrous Order of Agricultural, Industrial and Commercial Merit, the Colonial Order of the Star of Italy and later, by the Civil and Military Order of the Roman Eagle. In contrast to the Republican orders, the feminine style Dama is used for women.

The Knight Bachelor, usually transmitted by male primogeniture, was similar to a British baronetcy but older. These Cavaliere Ereditario were not, however, members of an order of chivalry.

Supreme Order of the Most Holy Annunciation
The origins of the Ordine supremo della Santissima Annunziata date from 1362, when Amadeus VI, Count of Savoy, instituted the Order of the Collar, dedicated to the Blessed Virgin Mary. Eventually, it became a requirement for a person to have already received the Order of Saints Maurice and Lazarus before being admitted. The highest ranking honour of the Kingdom of Italy and limited to 20 Knights; it continues to be awarded by the Sovereign Head of the order, the head of the House of Savoy, in recognition of "eminent services in high military positions, to those who have distinguished themselves in senior positions in the civil service and to those who, as private citizens, have brought distinction upon Italy as exemplary benefactors of the nation or of mankind or have rendered particularly noteworthy services to the former Royal house."

Military and Religious Order of Saints Maurice and Lazarus
The Ordine militare e religioso dei Santi Maurizio e Lazzaro was formed in 1572 by a union of the original Order of Saint Maurice (1434) and the Italian foundation of the Military and Hospitaller Order of Saint Lazarus of Jerusalem (1142). (Note: Instituted by Papal Bull of the Supreme Pontiff Pope Gregory XIII on 16 September and 13 November 1572.) Eventually, it became a requirement for a person to have already received the Order of the Crown of Italy in at least the same degree before being admitted. The order continues to be awarded by its Grand Master, for "significant contributions to science, literature, the arts, industry, trade, scholarship and research, the liberal arts, the professions, public service and other worthy fields of endeavour, which bring honour and greatness to the House of Savoy and benefits to humanity."

The formerly associated Maurician Medal for Military Merit of ten lustrums (fifty years), established in 1839, (Note: Royal Magistral Patent dated 19 July 1839 instituting the Medaglia Mauriziana pel Merito Militare di dieci lustri, approved by Royal Decree of 21 December 1924.) was one of the few medals not suppressed by the Republic, becoming the Maurician Medal of Merit for ten lustrums military career in 1954.

Order of the Crown of Italy
The Ordine della Corona d'Italia was founded in 1868 by King Vittorio Emanuele II, to commemorate unification. (Note: Founded by Royal Decree No. 4251 of 20 February 1868, renewed by Royal Decree No. 4850 of 24 January 1869, Royal Magistral Decree of 17 November 1907 and Royal Decree No. 276 of 16 March 1911.) The order was awarded more liberally than the Order of Saints Maurice and Lazarus and could be conferred on non-Catholics as well. It continued to be awarded for civilian and military merit by the head of the former Royal house in exile (acting as King of Italy) until the demise of the last reigning monarch in 1983.

Civil Order of Savoy
The Ordine Civile di Savoia was founded in 1831 by the King of Sardinia, Charles Albert, Duke of Savoy, to reward those virtues not belonging to the existing Military Order of Savoy. Admission, limited to 70 Italians, was in the personal gift of the monarch and, as such, it continues to be awarded, rarely, by the head of the House of Savoy to those who "have by their long and diligent efforts, become outstanding members of society, or who have contributed greatly to the common good," among the scientists, lettered, administrators, engineers, architects, artists, authors, athletes, philanthropist and publishers of discoveries and to the teachers of sciences and letters and the managers of education. It was replaced by his successor with the Order of Merit (falling within the Civil Order) of Savoy in 1988.

Colonial Order of the Star of Italy
The Ordine coloniale della Stella d'Italia was founded in 1914 by King Vittorio Emanuele III, to reward soldiers deployed in the colony of Libya. It had fallen into abeyance by 1943, when Allied forces re-took the colonies of Italian North Africa.

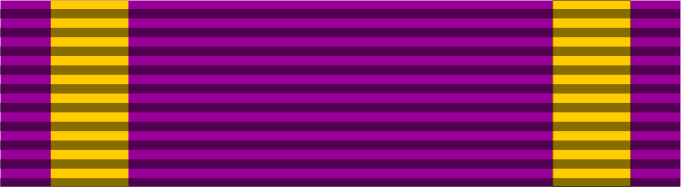

Order of the Roman Eagle
The Fascist Ordine civile e militare dell'Aquila Romana founded in 1942 with civil and military divisions (Note: By Royal Decree No. 172 of 14 March 1942.) was formally abolished in 1944; (Note: By Decree of the Lieutenant of the Realm of 5 October 1944.) although it continued to be awarded in the short-lived Italian Social Republic with, from February to April 1945, the Order of the Patron Saints of Italy.

=== The Kingdom of two Sicilies ===
Order of Saint Januarius
The Illustrious Royal Order of Saint Januarius (Italian: Insigne Reale Ordine di San Gennaro) is an order of knighthood in the Roman Catholic Church. The order was founded by Charles VII of Naples in 1738. It was the last great dynastic order to be constituted as a chivalric fraternity, with a limitation to Roman Catholics and a direct attachment to the dynasty rather than the state. The founder of the order, Charles VII of Naples, ruled from 1734 until 1759.
- Sacred Military Constantinian Order of Saint George
The Sacred Military Constantinian Order of Saint George (SMOCG) (Italian: Sacro Militare Ordine Costantiniano di San Giorgio, Spanish: Sagrada Orden Militar Constantiniana de San Jorge), also historically referred to as the Imperial Constantinian Order of Saint George and the Order of the Constantinian Angelic Knights of Saint George, is a dynastic order of knighthood of the House of Bourbon-Two Sicilies. The order was founded either in c. 330 (legendary) or c. 1545 (actual).
Order of Saint Ferdinand and Merit
The Illustrious Royal Order of Saint Ferdinand and Merit is an order of knighthood of the Kingdom of the Two Sicilies.

It was established on 1 April 1800 by Ferdinand IV of Naples and III Sicily to reward men who performed important deeds and gave proof of loyalty to the Head of the Royal House and to the Royal Family.

Royal Order of the Two-Sicilies
The Royal Order of the Two-Sicilies (Italian: Ordine reale delle Due Sicilie) was a dynastic order of knighthood of the Kingdom of Naples and the Kingdom of Two Sicilies. The order was established 24 February 1808 by Joseph Bonaparte, who, at the time, was the King of Naples. The order was expanded and continued under the rule of Joachim Murat but was ultimately suppressed by Ferdinand I of the Two Sicilies in 1819. Those Knights of the Order of the Two-Sicilies who were still active were instead awarded the Order of Saint George and Reunion.
Order of Saint George of the Reunion
The Order of Saint George of the Reunion is an order of knighthood of the Kingdom of the Two Sicilies. It was established to replace the Royal Order of the Two-Sicilies.

It was created on 1 January 1819 by Ferdinand I of the Two Sicilies to reward military valor and merit. It received its name to celebrate the reunification of Naples and Sicily into one kingdom after the Congress of Vienna.

Royal Order of Francis I
The Royal Order of Francis I (properly 'The Royal Order of Francis I of the Two Sicilies' Italian: Reale Ordine di Francesco I) was an extinct order of merit of the former Kingdom of the Two Sicilies which was annexed in 1861 by the King of Italy (until 1860 King of Piedmonte and Sardinia). It has been revived by Prince Carlo, Duke of Castro, as an award for services to charity and inter-religious understanding and includes a number of non-Catholic statesmen and stateswomen among its membership.

== Decorations ==
=== Italian Republic ===
Name	Ribbon	Awarded for	Reference
Medal of Military Valor		Exceptional valor in the face of the enemy	
War Cross for Military Valor		Valor in time of war	
Medal of Valor of the Army		Activities bringing luster and decorum to the Italian Army not in time of war	
Medal of Valor of the Navy		Acts of courage aimed at saving lives at sea	
Medal of Valor of the Air Forces		Acts of courage and philanthropy in the Air Forces	
Medal of Valor of the Carabineri Branch		Acts of courage in military operations not in time of war serving the Carabinieri	
Medal of Valor of the Financial Guard		Acts of courage aimed at saving lives, preventing accidents, or bringing luster and decorum while serving the Guardia di Finanza	
Award for Civil Valor		Acts of exceptional courage manifesting civic virtue	

== Medals ==
=== Medals of Merit ===
- War Merit Cross
- Army Cross of Merit
- Navy Cross of Merit
- Air Force Cross of Merit
- Carabinieri Cross of Merit
- Financial Guard Cross of Merit
- Civil Merit Cross
- Labour Merit Star
- Medal of Merit for Culture and Art

=== Service medals ===
- Maurician medal

== See also ==
- Nobility of Italy
- Italian honorifics
- Order (distinction)
