= Nicholas I of Russia =

Emperor of Russia from 1825 to 1855

Nicholas I
- King of Poland; Grand Duke of Finland
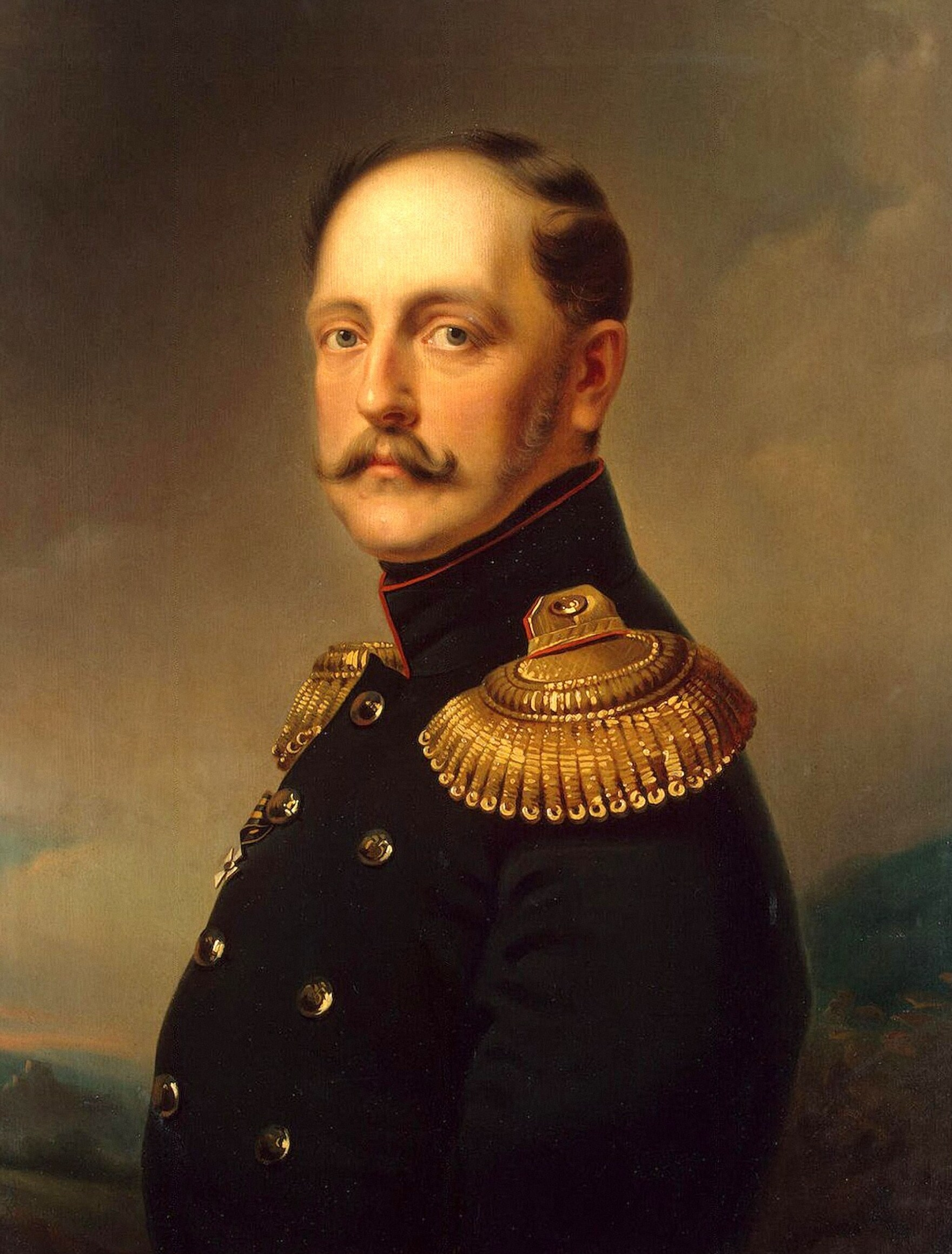
- Portrait, c. 1852

Emperor of Russia
- Reign: 1 December 1825 – 2 March 1855
- Coronation: 3 September 1826
- Predecessor: Alexander I
- Successor: Alexander II

King of Poland
- Reign: 1 December 1825 – 2 March 1855
- Coronation: 24 May 1829
- Predecessor: Alexander I
- Successor: Alexander II
- Born: 6 July 1796; Gatchina Palace, Gatchina, Leningrad Oblast, Russia
- Died: 2 March 1855 (aged 58); Winter Palace, Saint Petersburg, Russia
- Burial: Saints Peter and Paul Cathedral, Saint Petersburg
- Spouse: Charlotte of Prussia (m. 1817)
- Issue: Alexander II, Emperor of Russia; Maria Nikolaevna, Duchess of Leuchtenberg; Olga, Queen of Württemberg; Alexandra, Princess of Hesse-Kassel; Grand Duke Constantine; Grand Duke Nicholas; Grand Duke Michael
Names
- Nikolay Pavlovich Romanov; Russian: Николай Павлович Романов
- House: Holstein-Gottorp-Romanov
- Father: Paul I of Russia
- Mother: Sophie Dorothea of Württemberg

Nicholas I (Note: Russian: Николай I Павлович, romanized: Nikolay I Pavlovich, IPA: [nʲɪkɐˈlaj ˈpʲervɨj ˈpavləvʲɪtɕ].) (6 July [O.S. 25 June] 1796 – 2 March [O.S. 18 February] 1855) was Emperor of Russia, King of Poland, and Grand Duke of Finland from 1825 to 1855. He was the third son of Paul I and younger brother of his predecessor, Alexander I. Nicholas's 29-year reign began with the failed Decembrist revolt. He is mainly remembered as a reactionary whose controversial reign was marked by geographical expansion, centralisation of administrative policies, and repression of dissent both in Russia and among its neighbors. Nicholas had a happy marriage that produced a large family, with all of their seven children surviving childhood.

Nicholas's biographer Nicholas V. Riasanovsky said that he displayed determination, singleness of purpose, and an iron will, along with a powerful sense of duty and a dedication to very hard work. He saw himself as a soldier—a junior officer consumed by spit and polish. A handsome man, he was highly nervous and aggressive. Trained as a military engineer, he was a stickler for minute detail. In his public persona, stated Riasanovsky, "Nicholas I came to represent autocracy personified: infinitely majestic, determined and powerful, hard as stone, and relentless as fate."

Nicholas I was instrumental in helping to create an independent Greek state and resumed the Russian conquest of the Caucasus by seizing Iğdır Province and the remainder of modern-day Armenia and Azerbaijan from Qajar Iran during the Russo-Persian War (1826–1828). He ended the Russo-Turkish War (1828–1829) successfully as well. He crushed the November Uprising in Poland in 1831 and decisively aided Austria during the Hungarian Revolution of 1848. Later on, however, he led Russia into the Crimean War (1853–1856), with disastrous results. Historians emphasize that his micromanagement of the armies hindered his generals, as did his misguided strategy. Several historians have concluded that "the reign of Nicholas I was a catastrophic failure in both domestic and foreign policy." On the eve of his death, the Russian Empire spanned over 20 million square kilometers (7.7 million square miles), but had a desperate need for reform.

== Early life and road to power ==
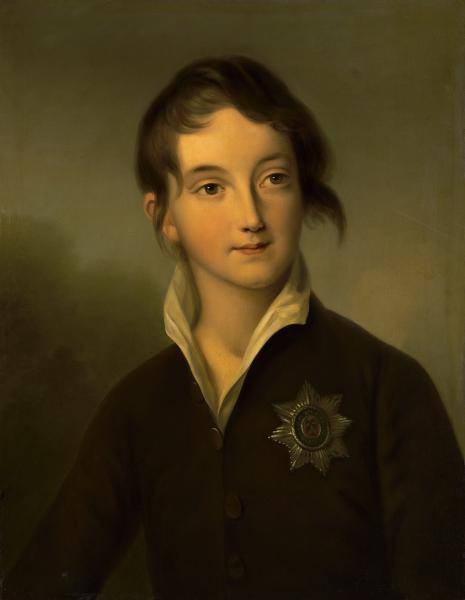
Portrait of Grand Duke Nicholas Pavlovich (c. 1808), by anonymous painter after Johann Friedrich August Tischbein, located in the Russian Museum, Saint Petersburg

Nicholas was born in 1796 at Gatchina Palace in Gatchina, the ninth child of Grand Duke Paul, heir to the Russian throne, and Grand Duchess Maria Feodorovna of Russia (née Sophie Dorothea of Württemberg).

He had six older sisters and two older brothers, namely the future Emperor Alexander I of Russia and Grand Duke Constantine Pavlovich of Russia.

Four months after Nicholas's birth, his grandmother, Catherine the Great, died and his parents became Emperor and Empress of Russia. In 1800, at the age of four years, Nicholas was named Grand Prior of Russia and entitled to wear the Maltese cross. Nicholas grew up to be a fine young man. Riasanovsky says of him that he is "the most handsome man in Europe, but also a charmer who enjoyed feminine company and was often at his best with the men."

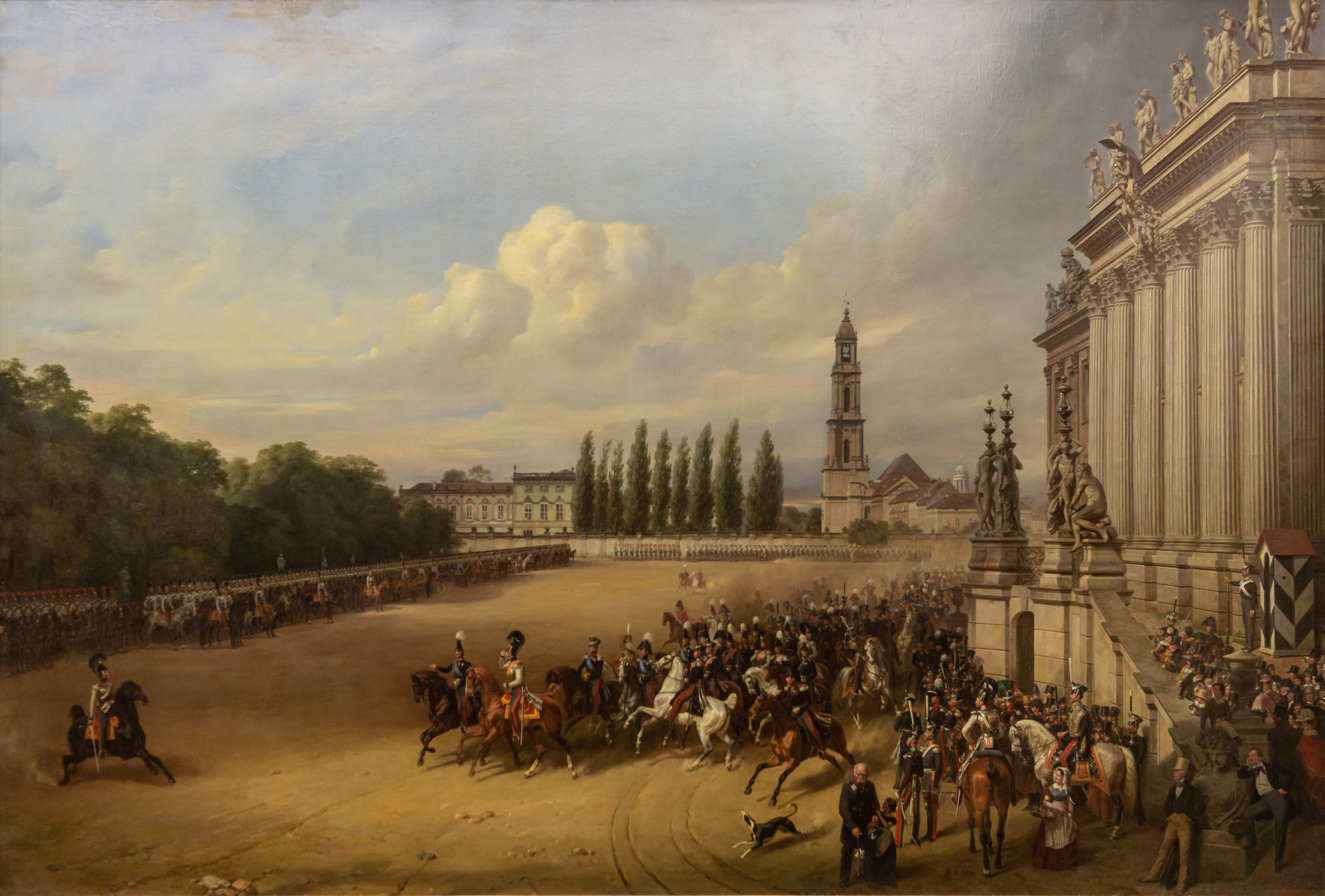
Parade in Potsdam in 1817 by Franz Krüger. A painting commemorating his visit to Berlin to marry Princess Charlotte of Prussia

On 13 July 1817, Nicholas married Princess Charlotte of Prussia (1798–1860), who took the name Alexandra Feodorovna when she converted to Orthodoxy. Charlotte's parents were Frederick William III of Prussia and Louise of Mecklenburg-Strelitz. Nicholas and Charlotte were third cousins, as they were both great-great-grandchildren of Frederick William I of Prussia.

With two older brothers, it initially seemed unlikely Nicholas would ever become Tsar. However, as Alexander and Constantine both failed to produce legitimate sons, Nicholas first came to attention as being likely to rule one day, or at least that his children may succeed. In 1825, when Tsar Alexander died suddenly of typhus, Nicholas was caught between swearing allegiance to Constantine and accepting the throne for himself. The interregnum lasted until Constantine, who was in Warsaw at that time, officially forfeited his right to succession. This had been required by Tsar Alexander as a condition of Constantine's marriage to his second wife Joanna Grudzinska. On 25 (13 Old Style) December, Nicholas issued the manifesto proclaiming his accession to the throne. That manifesto retroactively named 1 December (19 November Old Style), the date of Alexander I's death, as the beginning of his reign. During this confusion, a plot was hatched by some members of the military to overthrow Nicholas and seize power. This led to the Decembrist Revolt on 26 (14 Old Style) December 1825, an uprising Nicholas quickly suppressed.

== Emperor and principles ==
Imperial monogram

=== Early reign ===
Nicholas completely lacked his brother's spiritual and intellectual breadth; he saw his role simply as that of a paternal autocrat ruling his people by whatever means necessary. Nicholas I began his reign on 14 December 1825 (old style), which fell on a Monday; Russian superstition held that Mondays were unlucky days. This particular Monday dawned very cold, with temperatures of −8 degrees Celsius. This was regarded by the Russian people as a bad omen for the coming reign.

The accession of Nicholas I was marred by a demonstration of 3000 young army officers and other liberal-minded citizens. This demonstration was an attempt to force the government to accept a constitution and a representative form of government. Nicholas ordered the Imperial Russian Army to smash the demonstration. The "uprising" was quickly put down and became known as the Decembrist revolt. Having experienced the trauma of the Decembrist revolt on the first day of his reign, Nicholas I was determined to restrain Russian society. The Third Section of the Imperial Chancellery ran a huge network of spies and informers with the help of Gendarmes. The government exercised censorship and other forms of control over education, publishing, and all manifestations of public life.

Nicholas appointed Alexander Benckendorff to head this Chancellery. Benckendorff employed 300 gendarmes and 16 staff in his office. He began collecting informers and intercepting mail. Soon, the saying that "it was impossible to sneeze in one's house before it is reported to the emperor" became Benckendorff's creed.

=== Local policies ===
Tsar Nicholas abolished several areas of local autonomy. Bessarabia's autonomy was removed in 1828, Poland's in 1830 and the Jewish Qahal was abolished in 1843. As an exception to this trend, Finland was able to keep its autonomy partly due to Finnish soldiers' loyal participation in crushing the November Uprising in Poland.

Russia's first railway was opened in 1837, a 26 km (16 mi) line between St. Petersburg and the suburban residence of Tsarskoye Selo. The second was the Saint Petersburg–Moscow railway, built-in 1842–51. Nevertheless, by 1855 there were only 920 km (570 mi) of Russian railways.

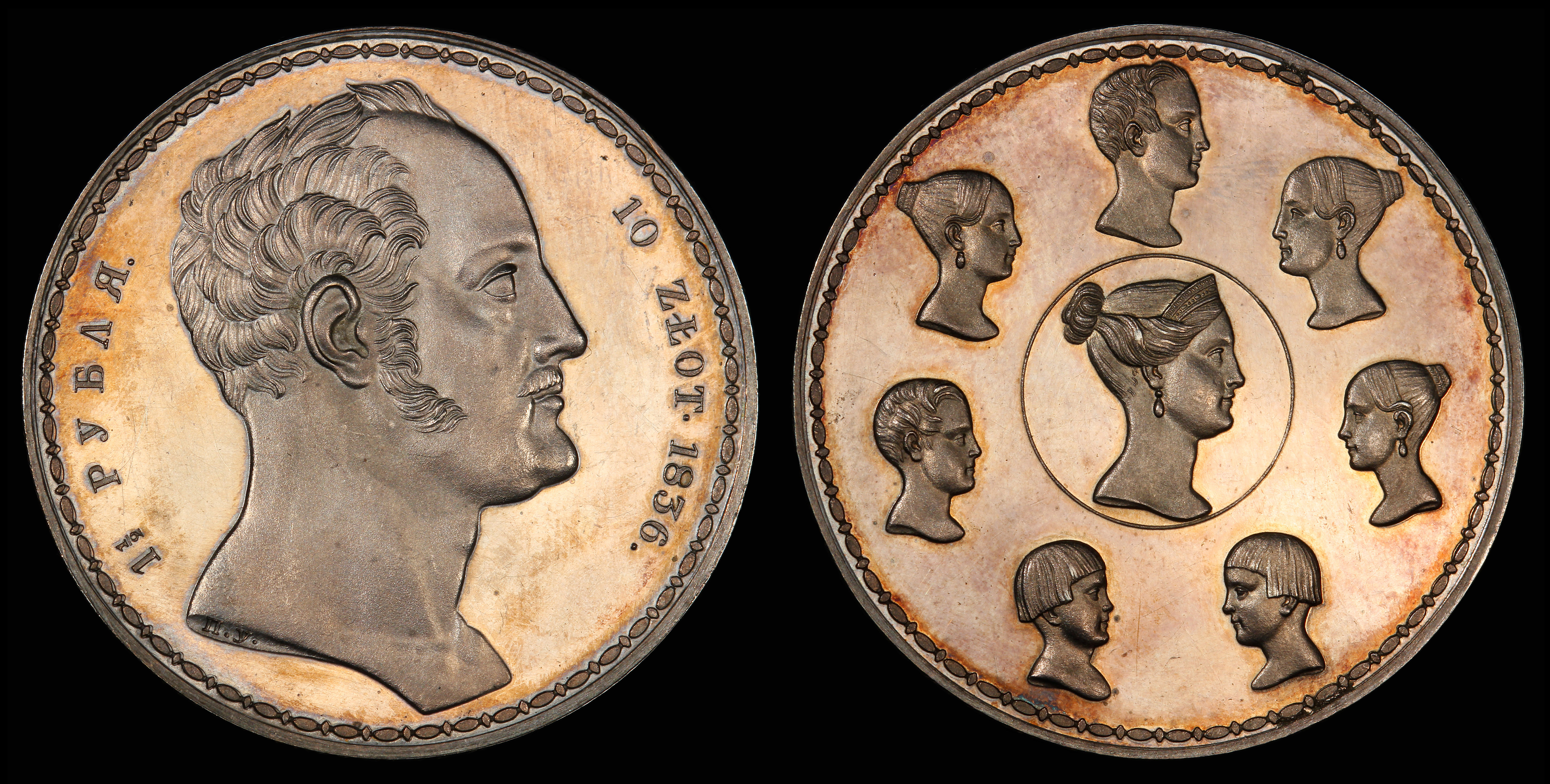
Nicholas I "Family Ruble" (1836) depicting the Tsar on the obverse and his family on the reverse: Tsarina Alexandra Feodorovna (center) surrounded by Alexander II as Tsarevich, Maria, Olga, Nicholas, Michael, Konstantin, and Alexandra

In 1833, Sergey Uvarov, of the Ministry of National Education, devised a program of "Orthodoxy, Autocracy, and Nationality" as the guiding principle of the regime. It was a reactionary policy based on orthodoxy in religion, autocracy in government, and the state-founding role of the Russian nationality and equal citizen rights for all other peoples inhabiting Russia, with the exclusion of Jews. The people were to show loyalty to the unrestricted authority of the tsar, to the traditions of the Russian Orthodox Church, and the Russian language. These romantic and conservative principles outlined by Uvarov were also espoused by Vasily Zhukovsky, one of the tutors of the Grand Duke Alexander. The results of these Slavophile principles led, broadly speaking, to increasing repression of all classes, excessive censorship, and surveillance of independent-minded intellectuals like Pushkin and Lermontov and to the persecution of non-Russian languages and non-Orthodox religions. Taras Shevchenko, later to become known as the national poet of Ukraine, was exiled to Siberia by a direct order of Tsar Nicholas after composing a poem that mocked the Tsar, his wife, and his domestic policies. By order of the Tsar, Shevchenko was kept under strict surveillance and prevented from writing or painting.

From 1839, Tsar Nicholas also used a former Byzantine Catholic Bishop named Joseph Semashko as his agent to re-unite Orthodoxy with the Eastern Rite Catholics of Ukraine, Belarus, and Lithuania with the Synod of Polotsk. This caused Tsar Nicholas to be condemned by a succession of Roman Pontiffs, the Marquis de Custine, Charles Dickens, and many Western governments. (See also Cantonists.)

Nicholas disliked serfdom and toyed with the idea of abolishing it in Russia, but declined to do so for reasons of state. He feared the aristocracy and believed they might turn against him if he abolished serfdom. However, he did make some efforts to improve the lot of the Crown Serfs (serfs owned by the government) with the help of his minister Pavel Kiselyov. During most of his reign he tried to increase his control over the landowners and other influential groups in Russia. In 1831, Nicholas restricted the votes in the Noble Assembly to those with over 100 serfs, leaving 21,916 voters. In 1841, landless nobles were banned from selling serfs separate from the land. From 1845, attainment of the 5th highest rank (out of 14) in the Table of Ranks was required to be ennobled, previously it had been the 8th rank.

== King of Poland ==
Nicholas was crowned King of Poland in Warsaw on 12 (24) May 1829, per the Polish Constitution, a document he would not respect thereafter. He is the only Russian monarch ever crowned King of Poland—although not the only one bestowed with the title.

After suppressing the November Uprising of 1830–31, Nicholas replaced the kingdom's constitution with the Organic Statute of the Kingdom of Poland, which replaced the personal union between the Kingdom of Poland and the Russian Empire with the "eternal incorporation" of Poland into Russia, along with abolishing the Polish parliament and merging its army with that of Russia.

== Culture ==
The official emphasis on Russian nationalism fueled a debate on Russia's place in the world, the meaning of Russian history, and the future of Russia. One group, the westernizers, believed that Russia remained backward and primitive and could progress only through adopting European culture and institutions. Another group, the Slavophiles, enthusiastically favored Slavic culture and customs, and disdained the West.

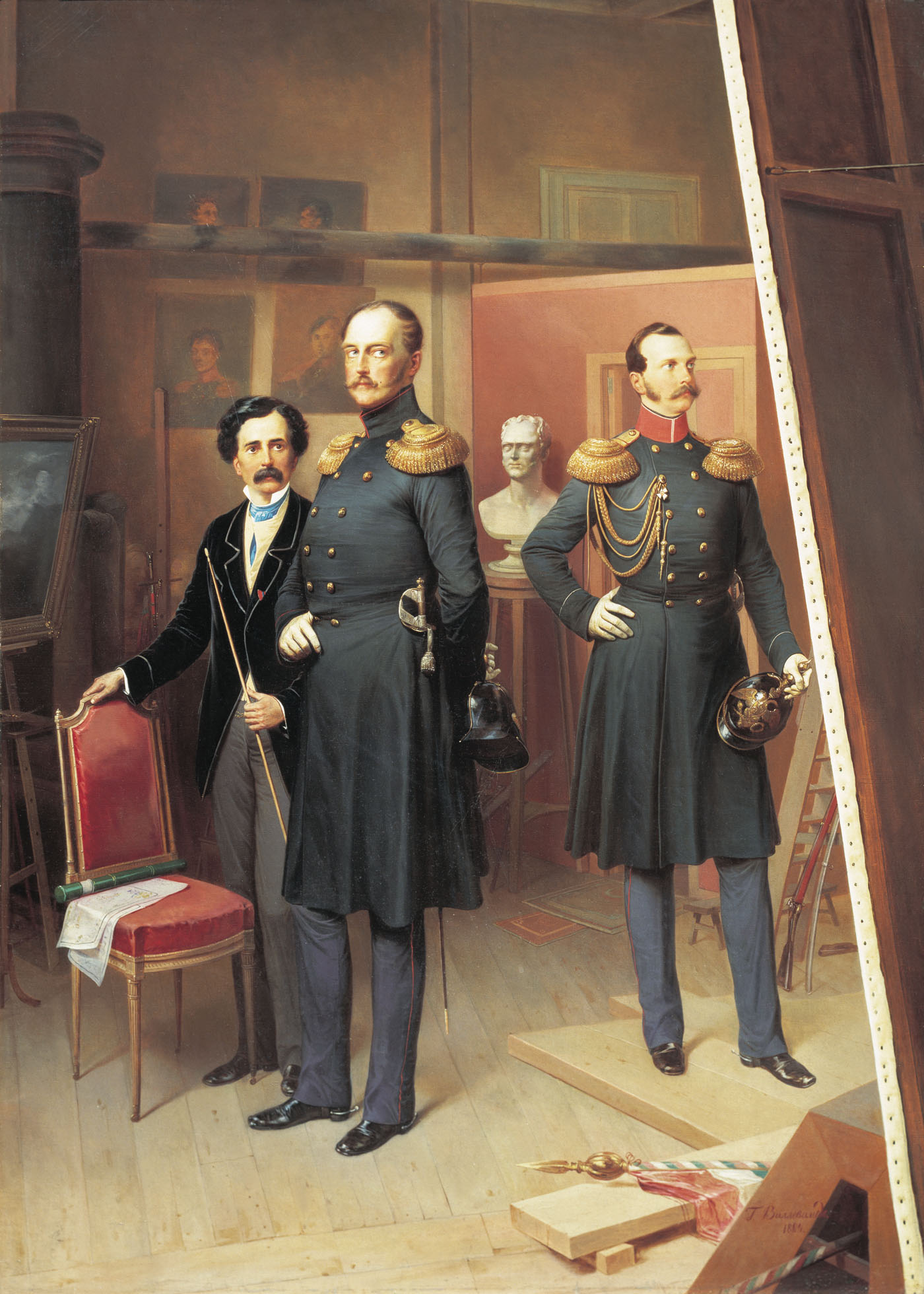
Nicholas I with Alexander II in Bogdan Willewalde's studio in Saint Petersburg in 1854, oil on canvas, State Russian Museum

The Slavophiles viewed Slavic philosophy as a source of wholeness in Russia and were sceptical of Western rationalism and materialism. Some of them believed that the Russian peasant commune, or Mir, offered an attractive alternative to Western capitalism and could save Europe from social and moral revolution, thus representing a form of Russian messianism. However the ministry of education had a policy of closing philosophy faculties to curb destabilizing speculation.

In the wake of the Decembrist revolt, the tsar moved to protect the status quo by centralizing education. He wanted to neutralize the threat of foreign ideas and "pseudo-knowledge". However, his minister of education, Sergei Uvarov, quietly promoted academic freedom and autonomy, raised academic standards, improved facilities, and opened higher education to the middle classes. By 1848 the tsar, fearing that political upheavals in the West might spread to Russia, ended Uvarov's innovations. The universities were small and closely monitored, especially the potentially dangerous philosophy departments. Their main mission was to train a loyal, vigorous, manly senior bureaucracy unspoiled by effeminate office work.

The Imperial Academy of Fine Arts in St. Petersburg became the main source of recognition and support for artists. Nicholas I decided to control it personally, reserving the final say on artistic honors. As the tsar reprimanded and humiliated artists whose works he found distasteful, the result was fear, insecurity, and artistic mediocrity.

Despite the repressions of this period, Russians outside official control produced a flowering of literature and the performing arts. Through the works of Aleksandr Pushkin, Nikolai Gogol, Ivan Turgenev and numerous others, Russian literature gained international stature and recognition. Ballet took root in Russia after its importation from France, and classical music became firmly established with the compositions of Mikhail Glinka (1804–1857).

The reign of Nicholas I also saw the development of notable connections between the imperial court and leading Western European composers. Hector Berlioz, whose Symphonie fantastique was later dedicated to the emperor, was received with particular favor and was granted official honors by him including sending Berlioz a lavish diamond-encrusted ring, a gesture that preceded the composer's successful and widely publicized concert tours in Russia in 1847. Relations with Franz Liszt were more complex: contemporary accounts describe moments of tension during Liszt's visits to St. Petersburg, including a widely repeated episode in which the composer reportedly halted a performance at the Winter Palace in reaction to the Tsar's conversation with his entourage. Despite such conflicts, Liszt maintained enduring ties to the imperial family through the patronage of the Tsar's sister, Grand Duchess Maria Pavlovna, who later supported his appointment in Weimar. His relationship with the Polish aristocrat Carolyne zu Sayn-Wittgenstein further complicated these connections, as her unresolved marital status and ties to a Russian military officer drew scrutiny from the court. Nevertheless, Nicholas I continued to acknowledge Liszt's artistic stature, bestowing several distinctions and gifts upon him during his career.

Minister of Finance Georg von Cancrin persuaded the emperor of the benefits of inviting Prussian scientist Alexander von Humboldt to Russia to investigate regions that could produce mineral wealth. The Russian government financed Humboldt's eight-month expedition through Russia in 1829, which resulted in diamond finds in the Ural mountains. Humboldt published multiple volumes on his Russian expedition, which he dedicated to Nicholas despite his increasing disapproval of the tsar's policies.

== Treatment of Jews ==
In 1851 the Jewish population numbered at 2.4 million, including 212,000 in Russian-controlled Poland. This made them one of the largest inorodtsy (non-Slavic) minorities in the Russian Empire.

On 26 August 1827 the edict of military conscription (Ustav rekrutskoi povinnosti) was introduced, which required Jewish boys to serve in the Russian military for 25 years from the age of 18. Before that many of them were forcibly conscripted into Cantonist schools from the age of 12, while being a Cantonist did not count into the time of military service. They were sent far away from their families to serve in the military so that they would have difficulty practising Judaism and become Russified, and sometimes compelled to convert to Christianity. The poorer village Jews, those without families, and unmarried Jews were especially targeted for military service. Between 1827 and 1854 it is estimated that there were 70,000 Jews conscripted.

Under Nicholas I, the Jewish agricultural colonisation of Ukraine continued with the transfer of Siberian Jews to Ukraine. In Ukraine, Jews were offered the opportunity to buy land, which left very little to support their families. On the other hand, these Jews were exempt from forced military conscription.

Under Nicholas I there were attempts to reform the education of Jews with the object of Russification. Study of the Talmud was disfavored. Nicholas I further toughened censorship of Jewish books in Yiddish and Hebrew by allowing these to be printed only in Zhitomir and Vilna.

== Military and foreign policy ==
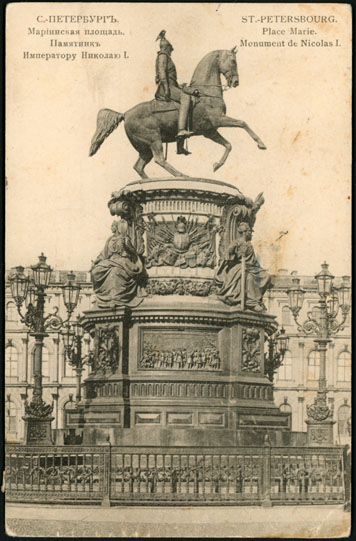
Monument to Nicholas I on St. Isaac's Square

Nicolas' aggressive foreign policy involved many expensive wars, having a disastrous effect on the empire's finances. Nicholas lavished attention on his very large army; of a population of 60–70 million people, the army counted one million men. They had outdated equipment and tactics, but the tsar, who dressed like a soldier and surrounded himself with officers, gloried in the victory over Napoleon in 1812 and took enormous pride in its smartness on parade. The cavalry horses, for example, were only trained in parade formations, and did poorly in battle. The glitter and braid masked profound weaknesses that he did not see. He put generals in charge of most of his civilian agencies regardless of their qualifications. An agnostic who won fame in cavalry charges was made supervisor of Church affairs. The army became the vehicle of upward social mobility for noble youths from non-Russian areas, such as Poland, the Baltic, Finland, and Georgia. On the other hand, many miscreants, petty criminals, and undesirables were punished by local officials by being enlisted for life in the Army. The conscription system was highly unpopular with people, as was the practice of forcing peasants to house the soldiers for six months of the year. Curtiss finds that "The pedantry of Nicholas's military system, which stressed unthinking obedience and parade ground evolutions rather than combat training, produced ineffective commanders in time of war." His commanders in the Crimean War were old and incompetent, and indeed so were his muskets as the colonels sold the best equipment and the best food.

For much of Nicholas' reign, Russia was seen as a major military power, with considerable strength. The Crimean War, fought shortly before Nicholas' death, demonstrated to both Russia and the world what few had previously realized: Russia was militarily weak, technologically backward, and administratively incompetent. Despite his grand ambitions toward the south and Turkey, Russia had not built railroad network in that direction, and communications were bad. The bureaucracy was unprepared for war being riddled with graft, corruption, and inefficiency. The Navy had few competent officers, the rank and file were poorly trained and most importantly its vessels were outdated; the army, although very large, was good only for parades, suffered from colonels who pocketed their men's pay, poor morale, and was even more out of touch with the latest technology as developed by Britain and France. By the war's end, Russia's leaders were determined to reform their military and society. As Fuller notes, "Russia had been beaten on the Crimean Peninsula, and the military feared that it would inevitably be beaten again unless steps were taken to surmount its military weakness."

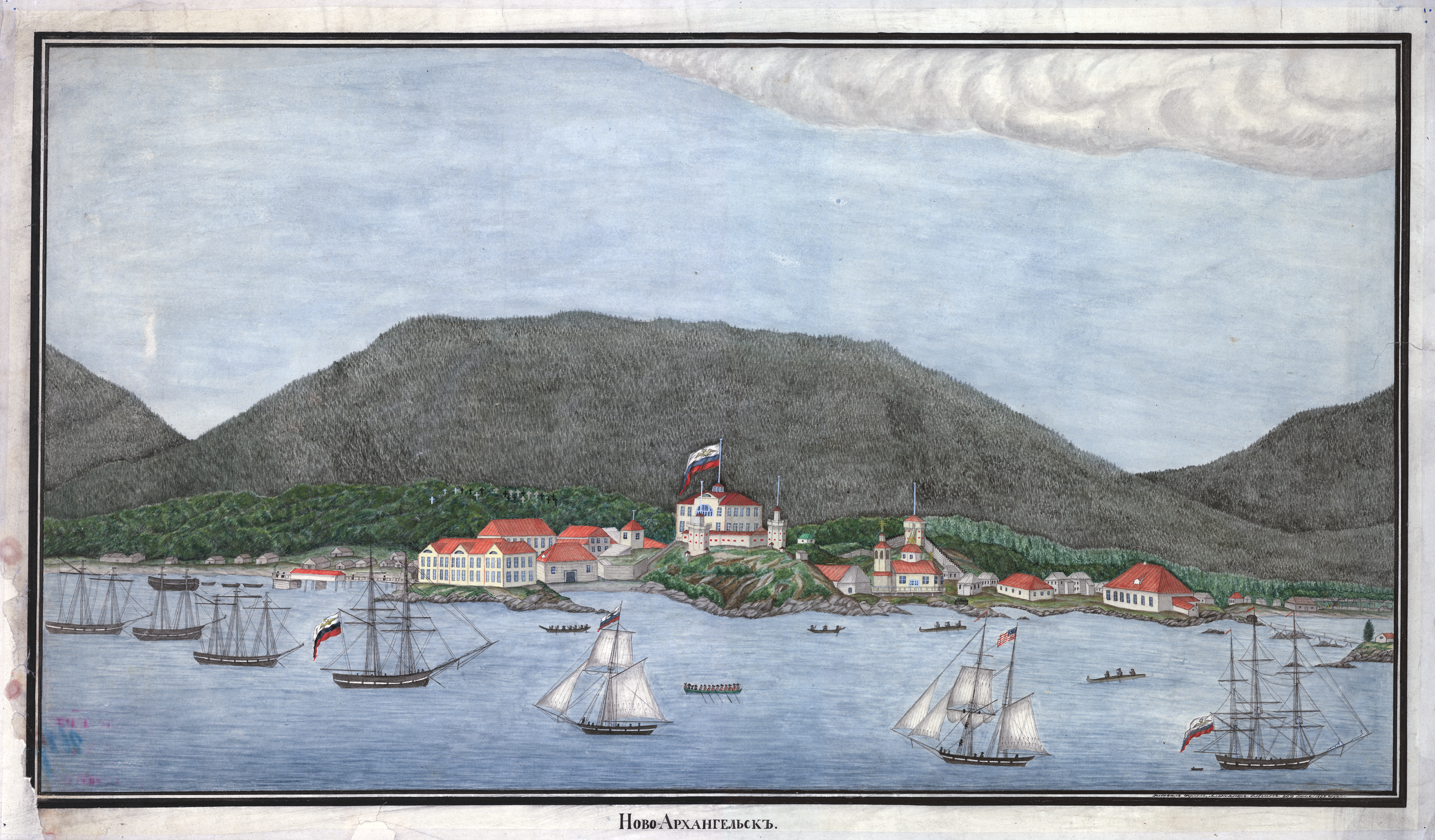
The Russian-American Company's capital at New Archangel (present-day Sitka, Alaska) in 1837

An intensely militaristic man, Nicholas regarded the Army as the best and greatest institution in Russia and as a model for society, saying:

Here [in the Army] there is order. ... All things flow logically from one another. No one here commands without first learning to obey. No one rises above anyone else except through a clearly defined system. Everything is subordinated to a single, defined goal and everything has its precise designations. That is why I shall always hold the title of soldier in the highest esteem. I regard human life as service because everybody must serve.

Nicholas was often exasperated by the slow pace of the Russian bureaucracy and had a marked preference for appointing generals and admirals to high government rank because of their perceived efficiency, overlooking or ignoring whether or not they were actually qualified for the role. Of the men who served as Nicholas's ministers, 61% had previously served as a general or an admiral. Nicholas liked to appoint generals who had seen combat, and at least 30 of the men who served as a minister under him had seen action in the wars against France, the Ottoman Empire, and Sweden. This proved to be something of a handicap in the sense that the sort of qualities that could make a man distinguished on the battlefields such as bravery did not necessarily make a man capable of running a ministry. The most notorious case was Prince Alexander Sergeyevich Menshikov, a competent brigade commander in the Imperial Army who proved himself out of his depth as a Navy minister. Of the Emperor's ministers, 78% were ethnic Russians, 9.6% were Baltic Germans while the rest were foreigners in Russian service. Of the men who served as ministers under Nicholas, 14 had graduated from university while another 14 had graduated from a lycée or a gymnasium, the rest had all been educated by private tutors.

=== Europe ===
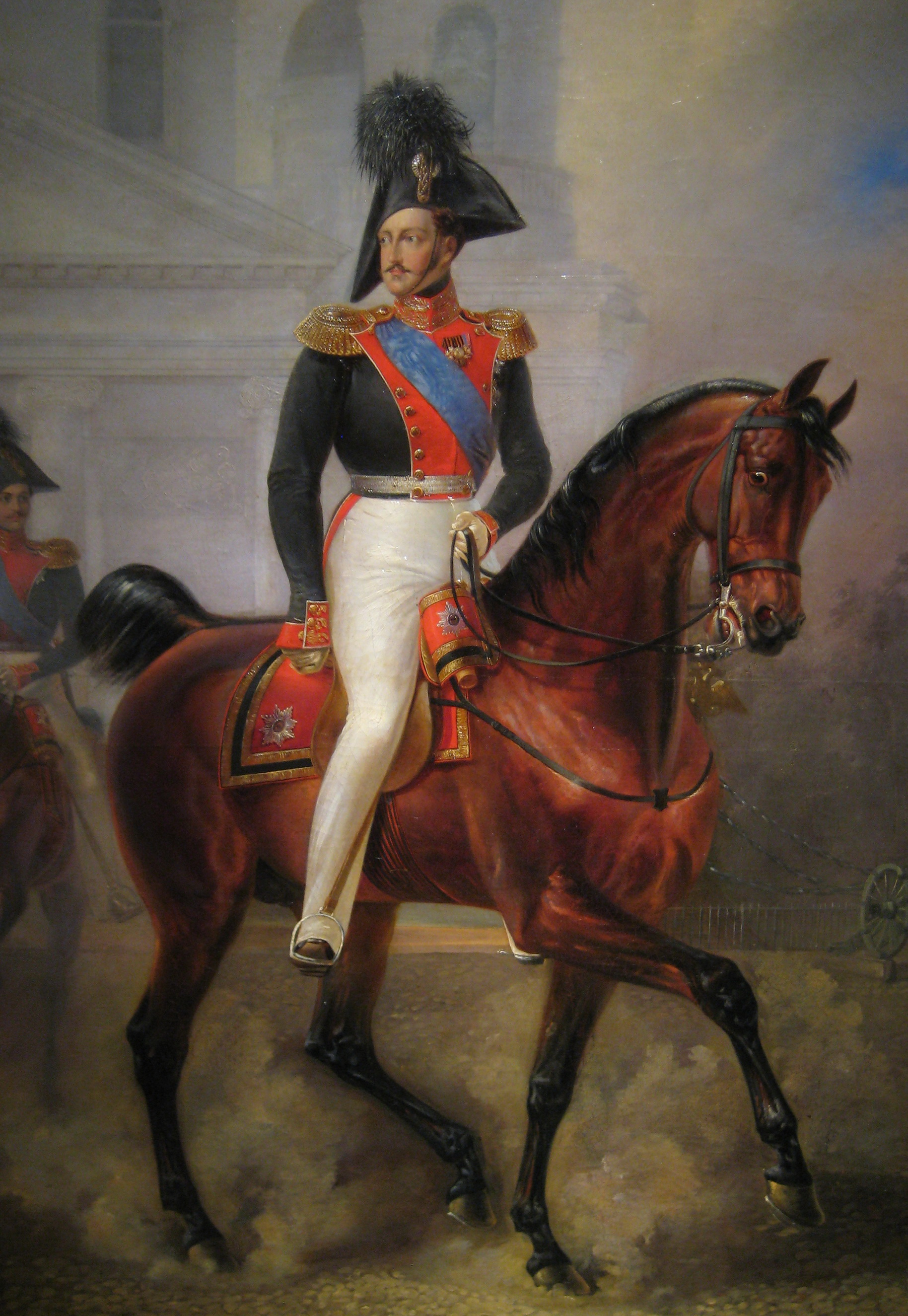
Nicholas I in an equestrian portrait

In foreign policy, Nicholas I acted as the protector of ruling legitimism and as guardian against revolution. It has often been noted that such policies were linked with the Metternich counter-revolutionary system through the Austrian ambassador Count Karl Ludwig von Ficquelmont. Nicholas's offers to suppress revolution on the European continent, trying to follow the pattern set by his eldest brother, Alexander I, earned him the label of "gendarme of Europe".

Immediately on his succession Nicholas began to limit the liberties that existed under the constitutional monarchy in Congress Poland. Nicholas was outraged when he learned of the Belgian revolt against the Dutch in 1830 and ordered the Imperial Russian Army to mobilize. Nicholas then petitioned the Prussian ambassador for Russian troops to be granted transit rights in order to march across Europe and restore Dutch hegemony over Belgium. But at the same time, a cholera epidemic was decimating Russian troops and the revolt in Poland tied down Russian soldiers which might have been deployed against the Belgians. It seems likely that Nicholas's hawkish stance was not a sincere prelude towards invasion of the Low Countries, but rather an attempt to apply pressure on the other European powers. Nicholas made it clear he would only act if Prussia and Britain also participated as he feared that a Russian invasion of Belgium would cause a war with France. Even before the Poles rose up, Nicholas had cancelled his plans for invading Belgium as it became clear that neither Britain nor Prussia would join in while the French openly threatened war if Nicholas should march. In 1815, Nicholas arrived in France, where he stayed with the Duke of Orleans, Louis Philippe, who soon become one of his best friends, with the grand duke being impressed with duke's personal warmth, intelligence, manners and grace. For Nicholas the worst sort of characters were nobility who supported liberalism, and when the duc d'Orleans became the king of the French as Louis Philippe I in the July revolution of 1830, Nicholas took this as a personal betrayal, believing his friend had gone over as he saw it to the dark side of revolution and liberalism. Nicholas hated Louis-Philippe, the self-styled Le roi citoyen ("the Citizen King") as a renegade nobleman and a "usurper", and his foreign policy starting in 1830 was primarily anti-French, based upon reviving the coalition that had existed during the Napoleonic era of Russia, Prussia, Austria and Britain, to isolate France. Nicholas detested Louis-Philippe to the point that he refused to use his name, referring to him merely as "the usurper". Britain was unwilling to join the anti-French coalition, but Nicholas was successful in cementing existing close ties with Austria and Prussia and the three imperial states regularly held joint military reviews during this time. For much of the 1830s, a sort of "cold war" existed between the liberal "western bloc" of France and Britain vs. the reactionary "eastern bloc" of Austria, Prussia and Russia.

After the November Uprising broke out, in 1831 the Polish parliament deposed Nicholas as king of Poland in response to his repeated curtailment of its constitutional rights. Nicholas reacted by sending Russian troops into Poland and brutally crushed the rebellion. Nicholas then proceeded to abrogate the Polish constitution in virtual entirety and reduced Poland to the status of a province called Vistula Land. Soon after, Nicholas embarked on a policy of repressing Polish culture beginning with suppressing the Polish Catholic Church. In the 1840s, Nicholas reduced 64,000 Polish nobles to commoner status.

In 1848, when a series of revolutions convulsed Europe, Nicholas was at the forefront of reactionism. In 1849, he helped the Habsburgs to suppress the revolution in Hungary, and he also urged Prussia not to adopt a liberal constitution.

=== Ottoman Empire and Persia ===
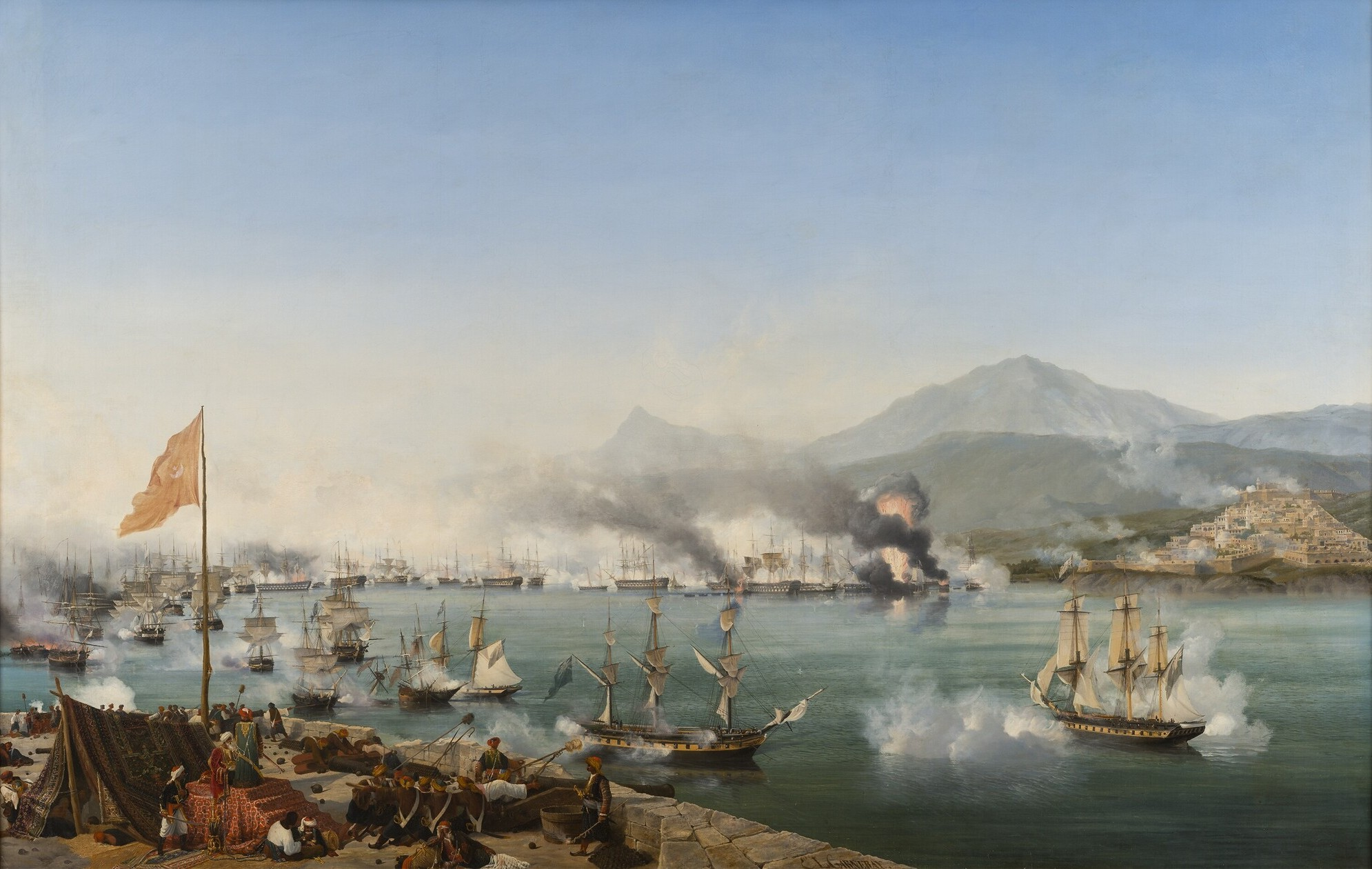
The Battle of Navarino, in October 1827, marked the effective end of Ottoman rule in Greece.

While Nicholas was attempting to maintain the status quo in Europe, he followed a somewhat more aggressive policy toward the neighbouring empires to the south, the Ottoman Empire and Persia. Nicholas was widely believed at the time to be following the traditional Russian policy of resolving the so-called Eastern Question by seeking to partition the Ottoman Empire and establish a protectorate over the Orthodox population of the Balkans, still largely under Ottoman control in the 1820s. In fact, Nicholas was deeply committed to upholding the status quo in Europe and feared any attempt to devour the decaying Ottoman Empire would both upset his ally Austria, which also had interests in the Balkans, and bring about an Anglo-French coalition in defense of the Ottomans. Furthermore, in the war of 1828–29, the Russians defeated the Ottomans in every battle fought in the field and advanced deep into the Balkans, but the Russians discovered that they lacked the necessary logistical strength to take Constantinople.

Nicholas' policy towards the Ottoman Empire was to use the 1774 Treaty of Küçük Kaynarca which gave Russia a vague right as protector of Orthodox peoples in the Balkans, as a way of placing the Ottoman Empire into the Russian sphere of influence, which was felt to be a more achievable goal than conquering the entire Ottoman Empire. Nicholas actually wanted to preserve the Ottoman Empire as a stable but weak state that would be unable to stand up to Russia, which was felt to serve Russia's interests. Nicholas always thought of Russia as first and foremost a European power and regarded Europe as more important than the Middle East. The Russian Foreign Minister Karl Nesselrode wrote in letter to his ambassador in Constantinople Nikolai Muravyov that the victory of Muhammad Ali of Egypt over Mahmud II would lead to a new dynasty ruling the Ottoman Empire. Nesselrode continued that if the able Muhammad Ali became sultan then it "could, with the elevation of a new personage to the Turkish throne, revive new strength in that declining empire and distract our attention and forces from European affairs, and thus the monarch [Nicholas] is especially concerned to keep the sultan on his tottering throne." At the same time, Nicholas argued that because of the economic importance to Russia of the Turkish straits, through which Russia exports its grain, that Russia had the "right" to intervene in Ottoman affairs. In 1833, Nicholas told the Austrian ambassador Karl Ludwig von Ficquelmont that "Oriental affairs are above all a matter for Russia." At the same time that Nicholas claimed the Ottoman Empire was within the Russian sphere of influence, he made it clear that he had no interest in annexing the empire. At another meeting with Ficquelmont in 1833, Nicholas, speaking with the "Greek Project" of Catherine the Great in mind said: "I know everything that has been said of the projects of the Empress Catherine, and Russia has renounced the goal she had set out. I wish to maintain the Turkish empire... It if falls, I do not desire its debris. I need nothing." Ultimately, Nicholas's policies in the Near East proved to be both costly and largely futile.

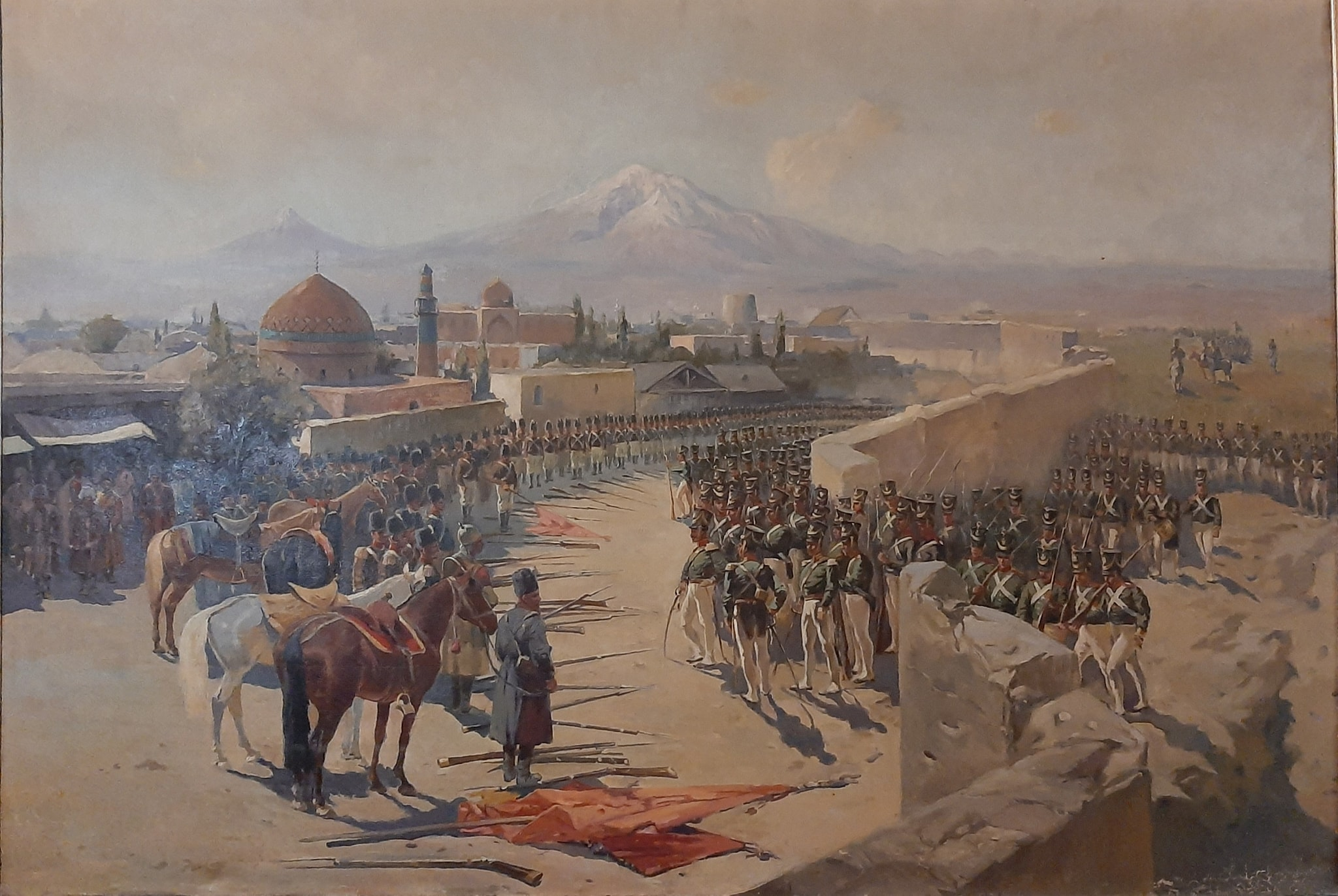
Capture of Erivan fortress by Russian troops under leadership of Ivan Paskevich in 1827 during the Russo-Persian War

In 1826–28, Nicholas fought the Russo-Persian War (1826–28), which ended with Persia forced to cede its last remaining territories in the Caucasus. Russia had conquered all the territories of Iran in both the North Caucasus and South Caucasus, comprising modern-day Georgia, Dagestan, Armenia, and Azerbaijan, through the course of the 19th century. The treaty further conceded extraterritoriality to Russian subjects in Iran (capitulation). As Professor Virginia Aksan adds, the 1828 Treaty of Turkmenchay "removed Iran from the military equation."

Russia fought a successful war against the Ottomans in 1828–29, but it did little to increase Russian power in Europe. Only a small Greek state became independent in the Balkans, with limited Russian influence. In 1833, Russia negotiated the Treaty of Unkiar-Skelessi with the Ottoman Empire. The major European parties mistakenly believed that the treaty contained a secret clause granting Russia the right to transit warships through the Bosphorus and Dardanelles straits. This misconception led to the London Straits Convention of 1841, which affirmed Ottoman control over the straits and forbade any power, including Russia, from sending warships through them. Buoyed by his role in suppressing the revolutions of 1848 as well as his mistaken belief he could rely on British diplomatic support, Nicholas moved against the Ottomans, who declared war on Russia on 8 October 1853. On 30 November, Russian Admiral Nakhimov caught the Turkish fleet in the harbor at Sinope and destroyed it.

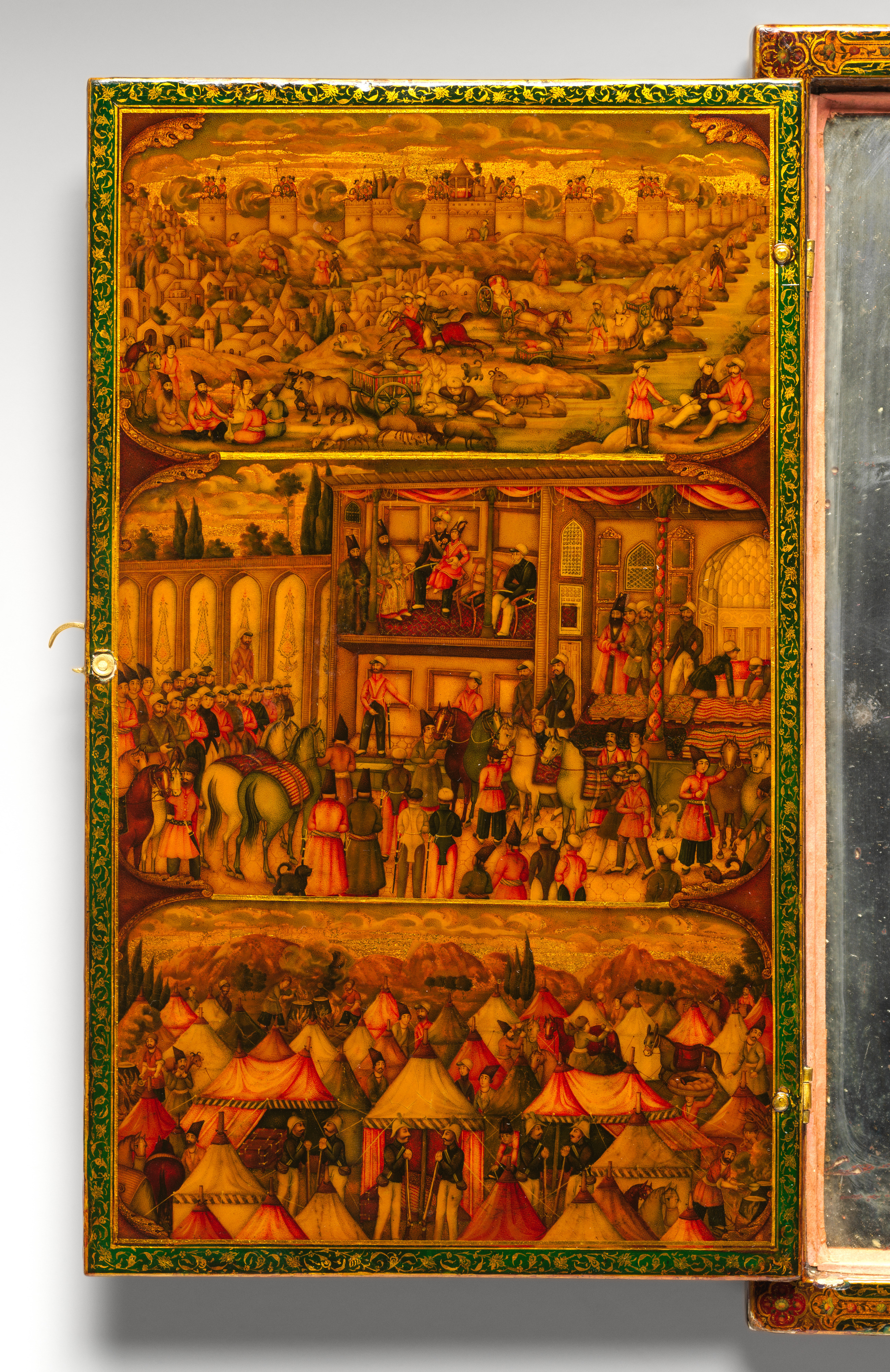
Interior panel of a mirror case commemorating the 1838 meeting of Iranian crown prince Naser al-Din Mirza (later, Shah) and Tsar Nicholas I of Russia in Erivan in the Armenian Oblast. The scene at the center shows the seven-year-old prince sitting on the tsar's lap, accompanied by an entourage. Created by Mohammad Esmail Esfahani in Tehran, dated 1854

Fearing the results of a total Ottoman defeat by Russia, in 1854 Britain, France, and the Kingdom of Sardinia formed a military coalition and joined forces with the Ottoman Empire against Russia. The preceding conflict became known as the Crimean War in the Ottoman Empire and Western Europe, but was labelled in Russia the "Eastern War" (Russian: Восточная война, Vostochnaya Vojna). In April 1854, Austria signed a defensive pact with Prussia. Thus, Russia found herself in a war with every Great Power of Europe either allied against her militarily or diplomatically.

In 1853 Mikhail Pogodin, professor of history at Moscow University, wrote a memorandum to Nicholas. Nicholas himself read Pogodin's text and approvingly commented: "That is the whole point." According to historian Orlando Figes, "The memorandum clearly struck a chord with Nicholas, who shared Pogodin's sense that Russia's role as the protector of the Orthodox had not been recognized or understood and that Russia was unfairly treated by the West." Pogodin wrote:

France takes Algeria from Turkey, and almost every year England annexes another Indian principality: none of this disturbs the balance of power; but when Russia occupies Moldavia and Wallachia, albeit only temporarily, that disturbs the balance of power. France occupies Rome and stays there several years during peacetime: that is nothing; but Russia only thinks of occupying Constantinople, and the peace of Europe is threatened. The English declare war on the Chinese, who have, it seems, offended them: no one has the right to intervene; but Russia is obliged to ask Europe for permission if it quarrels with its neighbor. England threatens Greece to support the false claims of a miserable Jew and burns its fleet: that is a lawful action; but Russia demands a treaty to protect millions of Christians, and that is deemed to strengthen its position in the East at the expense of the balance of power. We can expect nothing from the West but blind hatred and malice...

— Mikhail Pogodin's memorandum to Nicholas I, 1853

Austria offered the Ottomans diplomatic support, and Prussia remained neutral, thus leaving Russia without any allies on the continent. The European allies landed in Crimea and laid siege to the well-fortified Russian Sevastopol Naval Base. The Russians lost battles at Alma in September 1854 and then at Inkerman. After the prolonged Siege of Sevastopol (1854–55) the base fell, exposing Russia's inability to defend a major fortification on its own soil. On the death of Nicholas I, Alexander II became emperor. On 15 January 1856, the new emperor took Russia out of the war on very unfavorable terms, which included the loss of a naval fleet on the Black Sea.

== Death ==
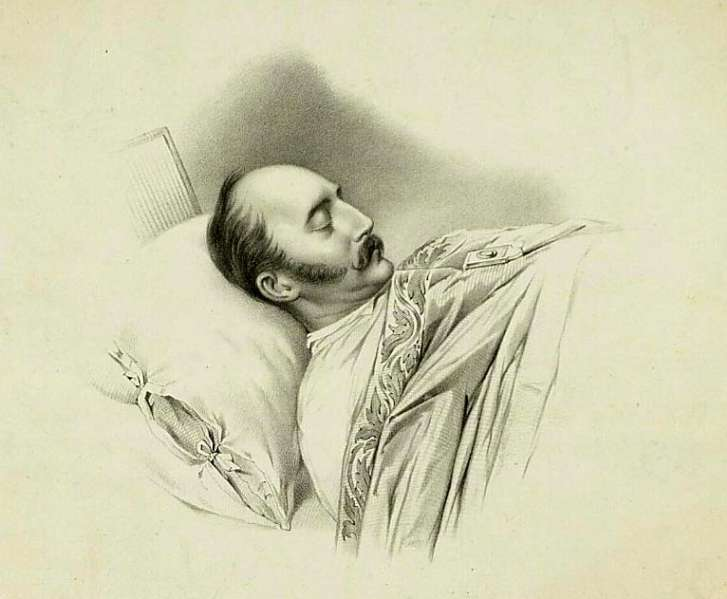
Nicholas I on his deathbed (1855)

Nicholas died on 2 March 1855, during the Crimean War, at the Winter Palace in St. Petersburg. He caught a chill, refused medical treatment and died of pneumonia, although there were rumors he was committing a passive suicide by refusing treatment. He was buried in the Peter and Paul Cathedral in St. Petersburg. He reigned for 30 years, and was succeeded by his son Alexander II.

== Legacy ==
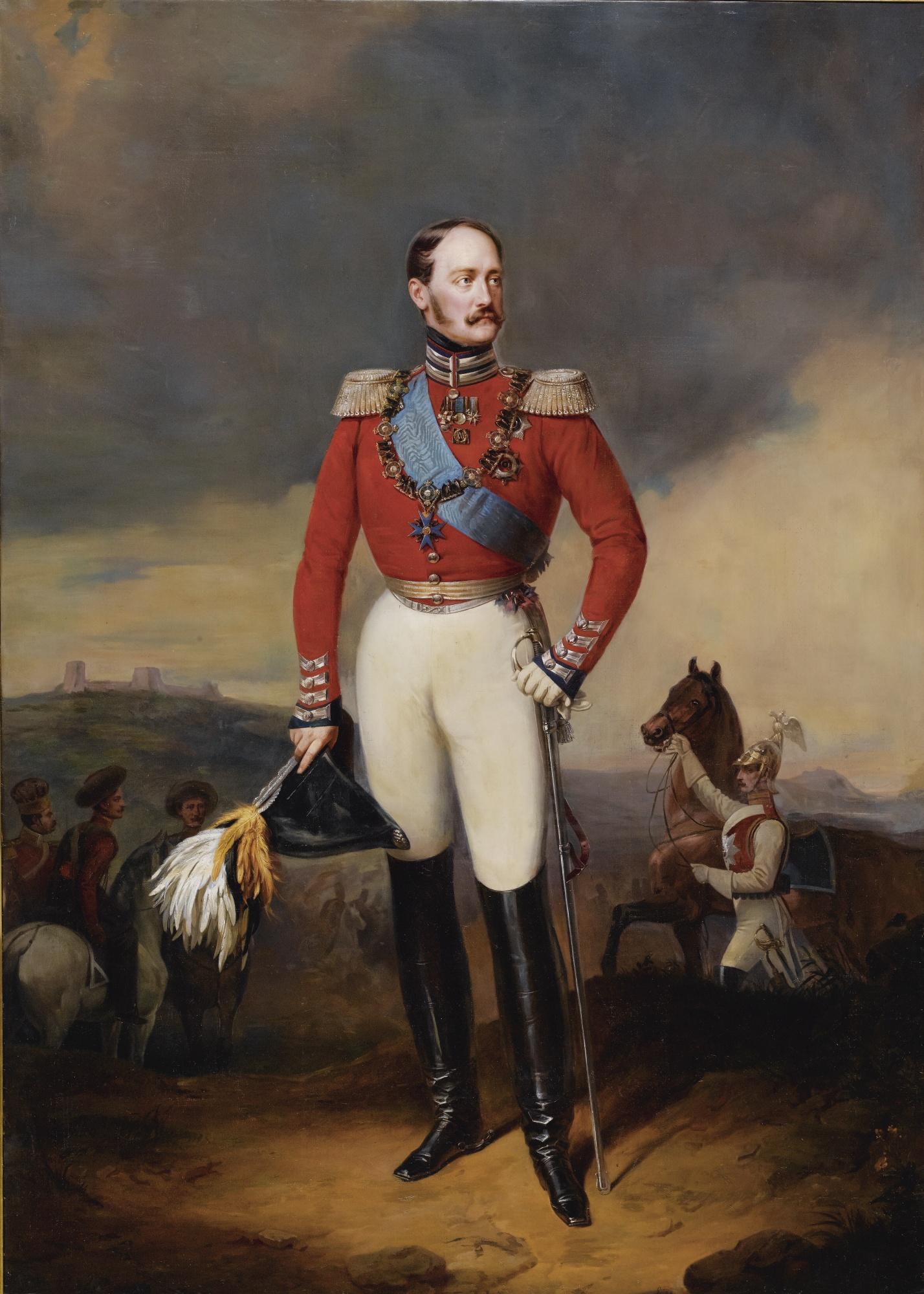
Portrait by Franz Krüger

There have been many damning verdicts on Nicholas' rule and legacy, despite occasional efforts to revive his reputation. At the end of his life, one of his most devoted civil servants, Aleksandr Nikitenko, opined, "the main failing of the reign of Nicholas Pavlovich was that it was all a mistake." In 1891 Lev Tolstoy popularised the nickname Николай Палкин (Nicholas the Stick) in reference to the late emperor's passion for military discipline.

Historian Barbara Jelavich points to many failures, including the "catastrophic state of Russian finances", the badly-equipped army, the inadequate transportation system, and a bureaucracy "characterized by graft, corruption, and inefficiency".

Kiev University was founded in 1834 by Nicholas. In 1854, there were 3600 university students in Russia, 1000 fewer than in 1848. Censorship was omnipresent; historian Hugh Seton-Watson writes: "the intellectual atmosphere remained oppressive until the end of the reign."

The Frenchman Marquis de Custine wrote the widely-read travel book La Russie en 1839 (Empire of the Czar: A Journey Through Eternal Russia). He speculated that Nicholas had a kind heart, but his sincere sense of duty forced him to impose severe discipline: "If the Emperor has no more of mercy in his heart than he reveals in his policies, then I pity Russia; if, on the other hand, his true sentiments are really superior to his acts, then I pity the Emperor."

According to a popular legend, when the Saint Petersburg–Moscow Railway was planned in 1842, Nicholas drew a straight line between the cities on a map, and decreed this as the path of the new rail line. Some ridiculed this as the epitome of Nicholas' mindless despotism, while others praised the tsar for overcoming local interests that wanted the railway diverted their own way. In fact, however, the tsar had merely endorsed the straight path recommended by engineers.

== Honours ==
Styles of Nicholas I of Russia
- Reference style: His Imperial Majesty
- Spoken style: Your Imperial Majesty

- Russian Empire:
  - Knight of St. Andrew, 6 July 1797
  - Knight of St. Alexander Nevsky, 6 July 1797
- Kingdom of Prussia:
  - Knight of the Black Eagle, 31 January 1809
  - Grand Cross of the Red Eagle, 31 January 1809
- Sweden: Knight of the Seraphim, 4 September 1812
- Spain: Knight of the Golden Fleece, 13 April 1817
- Kingdom of Bavaria: Knight of St. Hubert, 1823
- Kingdom of France: Knight of the Holy Spirit, 1824
- Denmark: Knight of the Elephant, 24 January 1826
- Sardinia: Knight of the Annunciation, 15 April 1826
- Netherlands: Grand Cross of the Military William Order, 11 May 1826
- Austrian Empire: Grand Cross of St. Stephen, 1826
- Saxe-Weimar-Eisenach: Grand Cross of the White Falcon, 3 November 1826
- Württemberg:
  - Grand Cross of the Württemberg Crown, 1826
  - Grand Cross of the Military Merit Order, 6 October 1826
- Two Sicilies:
  - Knight of St. Januarius, 1826
  - Grand Cross of St. Ferdinand and Merit
  - Grand Cross of St. George of the Reunion
- United Kingdom: Knight of the Garter, 16 March 1827
- Baden:
  - Grand Cross of the House Order of Fidelity, 1827
  - Grand Cross of the Military Karl-Friedrich Merit Order, 1827
  - Grand Cross of the Zähringer Lion, 1827
- Grand Duchy of Hesse: Grand Cross of the Ludwig Order, 11 April 1830
- Kingdom of Saxony: Knight of the Rue Crown, 1836
- Ascanian duchies: Grand Cross of Albert the Bear, 12 June 1837
- Oldenburg: Grand Cross of the Order of Duke Peter Friedrich Ludwig, with Golden Crown, 17 January 1839
- Kingdom of Hanover:
  - Knight of St. George, 1840
  - Grand Cross of the Royal Guelphic Order
- Electorate of Hesse: Grand Cross of the Golden Lion, 4 May 1844
- (Saxe-Coburg and Gotha) (Duchy of Saxe-Altenburg) (Saxe-Meiningen) Ernestine duchies: Grand Cross of the Saxe-Ernestine House Order, 1847
- Kingdom of Portugal: Grand Cross of the Sash of the Three Orders, 31 May 1850

== Issue ==
Nicholas I had seven legitimate children with his wife, Alexandra Feodorovna.

Name	Birth	Death	Notes
Emperor Alexander II	29 April 1818	13 March 1881	married 1841, Princess Marie of Hesse; had issue
Grand Duchess Maria Nikolaevna	18 August 1819	21 February 1876	married 1839, Maximilian de Beauharnais, 3rd Duke of Leuchtenberg; had issue
Grand Duchess Olga Nikolaevna	11 September 1822	30 October 1892	married 1846, Charles, King of Württemberg; had no issue
Grand Duchess Alexandra Nikolaevna	24 June 1825	10 August 1844	married 1844, Prince Frederick William of Hesse-Kassel; had issue (died in infancy)
Grand Duke Konstantin Nikolaevich	21 September 1827	25 January 1892	married 1848, Princess Alexandra of Saxe-Altenburg; had issue
Grand Duke Nicholas Nikolaevich	8 August 1831	25 April 1891	married 1856, Duchess Alexandra Petrovna of Oldenburg; had issue
Grand Duke Michael Nikolaevich	25 October 1832	18 December 1909	married 1857, Princess Cecilie of Baden; had issue

Many sources state that Nicholas did not have an extramarital affair until after 25 years of marriage, in 1842, when the Empress's doctors prohibited her from having sexual intercourse, due to her poor health and recurring heart attacks. Many facts dispute this claim. Nicholas fathered three known children with mistresses prior to 1842, including one with his most famous and well documented mistress, Varvara Nelidova.

With Anna-Maria Charlota de Rutenskiold (1791–1856)

- Joséphine or Youzia Koberwein (12 May 1825 – 23 February 1893)

With Varvara Yakovleva (1803–1831)

- Olga Carlovna Albrecht (10 July 1828 – 20 January 1898)

With Varvara Nelidova (d.1897)

- Alexis Pashkine (17 April 1831 – 20 June 1863)

== See also ==
- History of Russia
- Imperial Russia
- La Russie en 1839
- The Third Section
- Tsars of Russia family tree

== Notes ==
Nicholas I of Russia House of Holstein-Gottorp-Romanov Cadet branch of the House of Oldenburg Born: 6 July 1796 Died: 2 March 1855
Regnal titles
Preceded by Alexander I	Emperor of Russia; Grand Duke of Finland; King of Poland; 1 December 1825 – 2 March 1855	Succeeded by Alexander II
