= Royal Order of Saint Ferdinand =

Royal Order of Saint Ferdinand may refer to:

- Royal Military Order of Saint Ferdinand, commonly called Laureate Cross of Saint Ferdinand, Spain's highest military award for gallantry
- Royal Order of Saint Ferdinand and of Merit, an order of knighthood of the Kingdom of the Two Sicilies
