= Prison of peoples =

Phrase used by Vladimir Lenin to describe Russia

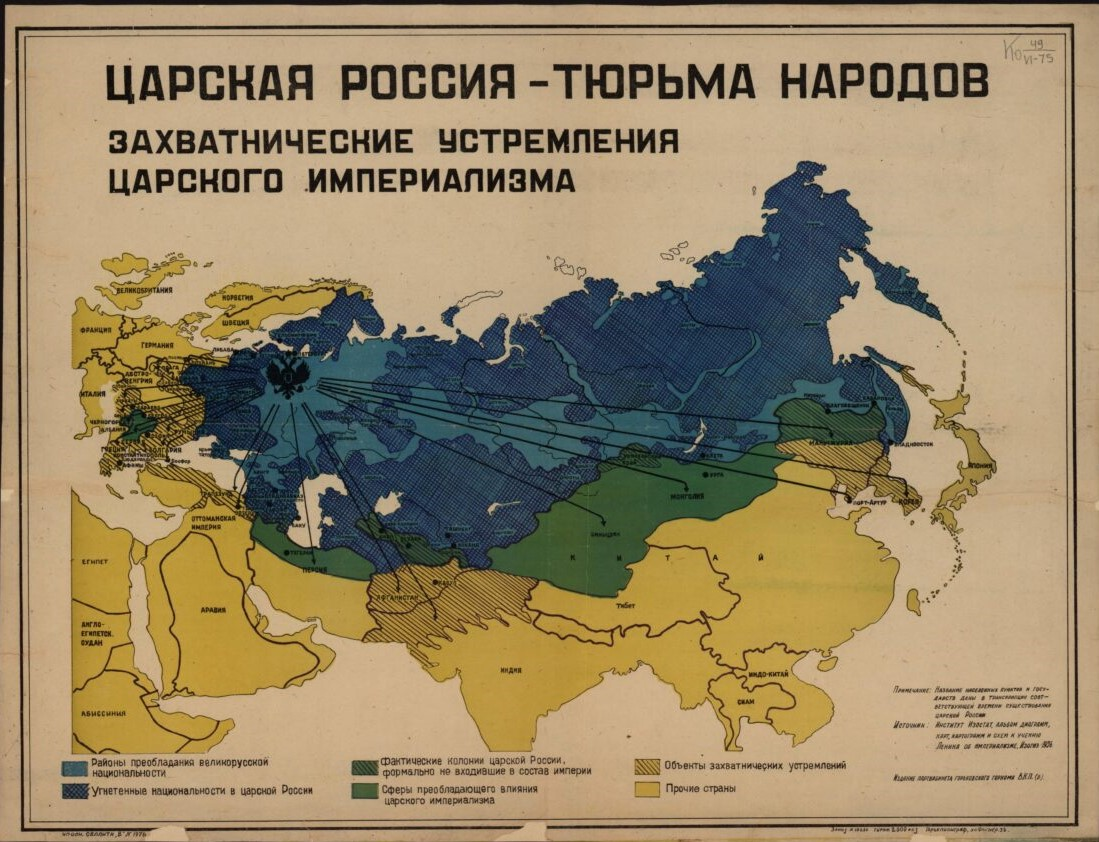
A 1936 Soviet poster "Tsarist Russia is a Prison of the Peoples"

Prison of peoples or prison of nations (Russian: тюрьма народов) conveys the general idea of the Russian Empire as a backward authoritarian state. This definition was also sometimes used in relation to other multinational states that suppressed the desire of peoples for self-determination (Austria-Hungary, the Ottoman Empire, the Soviet Union, Yugoslavia, Czechoslovakia and others).

It was popularized by Vladimir Lenin in 1914. He applied it to Russia, describing the national policy of that time. According to the historian K.V. Dushenko, Lenin was probably inspired by Ukrainian and Polish journalism of the early 20th century.

Engels had used the phrase in his writing in related context. It is also associated with Soviet historian Mikhail Pokrovsky's criticism of "Russia—prison of the peoples" and "Russia—international gendarmerie".

== Before Lenin ==
=== Marquis Adolphe de Custine ===
One of the first allusion to the concept is in Marquis Adolphe de Custine's book Russia in 1839 published in 1843. de Custine writes that:

Cet empire, tout immense qu'il est, n'est qu'une prison dont l'empereur tient la clef (…) Plus d'hésitation, plus d'incertitude; pour moi l'Empereur Nicolas est enfin jugé... C'est un homme de caractère et de volonté, il en faut pour se constituer le geôlier d'un tiers du globe mais il manque de magnanimité.

This empire, immense as it is, is nothing but a prison of which the emperor holds the key (…) No more hesitation, no more uncertainty; for me Emperor Nicholas is finally judged... He is a man of character and will, it takes that to become the jailer of a third of the globe but he lacks magnanimity.

The metaphor de Custine uses is indirect here, he states that Russia is a prison, and that the Tsar is a jailer of a third of the globe, but not that Russia is a prison of peoples.In an English addition to his book published in the same year called The Empire of the Czar; or, observations on the social, political, and religious state and prospects of Russia, however, he uses a similar phrase:

Like the bones of certain gigantic animals, the Kremlin proves to us the history of a world of which we might doubt until after seeing the remains. In this prodigious creation strength takes the place of beauty, caprice of elegance: it is like the dream of a tyrant, fearful but full of power; it has something about it that disowns the age; means of defence which are adapted to a system of war that exists no longer; an architecture that has no connexion with the wants of modern civilisation a heritage of the fabulous ages, a gaol, a palace, a sanctuary, a bulwark against the nation's foes, a bastile against the nation, a prop of tyrants, a prison of people, such is the Kremlin.

Dushenko argues that the phrase "prison of people" (singular) applies in a general sense to the population of the Empire, and more specifically to the Polish people, the only people that de Custines sees as more enlightened than the Russians. As de Custines elaborates:

The power over nations more savage and enslaved than itself belongs to Russia by right; this power is its lot, it, forgive me this expression, is inscribed in the book of its future; as for Russia's influence on more enlightened nations, it is very questionable.

=== Lajos Kossuth ===
The next use of the phrase is by Lajos Kossuth, the leader of the failed 1848 Hungarian revolution. Kossuth states the following in an 1852 speech in New York:

The present condition is one of oppression on the European continent, and because it is a condition of oppression, there cannot be peace for so long as men and nations are oppressed. So long as men and nations are discontented there cannot be peace- there cannot be tranquillity. But it is a volcano, boiling up and ready at the first opportunity to break out and sweep away all the artificial obstacles. This is the condition which these “men of peace” wish to conserve; but the tranquillity of affairs is merely the prison of nations.

According to Dushenko the "tranquility of affairs" refers to the status quo after the Vienna congress, and the "nations" that Kossuth refers to are the Hungarians, the Polish, and the Austrians, the "great nations", as opposed to the "small nations" such as the Slovaks or the Ukrainians.

=== Engels ===
In 1860, Friedrich Engels writes an article called "Was Hat die Arbeitersklasse mit Polen zu tun?". According to Boris Meissner, Engels emphasizes the necessity of National Liberation in places with a civilisation, a historical development, and a strong bourgeoisie as a precursor to proletarian revolution. Engels distinguishes between the Geschichtslose Völker (peoples without history) and the people with a history. He explicitly talks about Polish liberation.

=== Marx ===
In 1870, Marx fully changes his position on national liberation, writing in a letter to Sigfrid Meyer and August Vogt on the subject of Ireland, that:

In Ireland the land question has been up to now the exclusive form of the social question because it is a question of existence, of life and death, for the immense majority of the Irish people, and because it is at the same time inseparable from the national question.

According to Rodolsky, this is the start of a gradual shift of Marx and Engels abandoning the distinction between historic and non-historic peoples. This change in thinking eventually leads to the 2nd International making a declaration during its third conference in 1889 London on the national question:

The congress declares that it advocates the full right to self-determination of all nations and sympathizes with the workers of every country currently suffering under the yoke of military, national, or other despotism.

=== Ukrainian-Polish journalism ===
According to Dushenko, in 1900, a USDP member, Yevgeny Kosevich, wrote an obituary for Wilhelm Liebknecht, one of the founders of the SPD. The USDP was a Ukrainian Social-democratic party from Austrian Galicia. One of Liebknecht's main, merits, Kosevich believed, was that "Russia, this 'prison of nations' (тюрма народів), was for him the embodiment of tyranny, and the struggle against Russia was the starting point of his views on foreign policy". Liebknecht was writing within the context of the German Social-democratic dialogue on Poland started by Engels and Marx.

In 1902,Tadeusz Grużewski, belonging to the Polish national-democratic camp (the so-called Endecja), published an article “Former and Current Representations of Russia,” where, in particular, it was noted that in the era of Romanticism “to our politicians... and not only to politicians, Tsarism was seen as a black abyss of reaction, as a huge prison of nations (więzienie ludów), and Siberia, penal battalions, and finally, whips were not merely a metaphor.”

According to Dushenko, this language became used in a limited fashion within the scene of Ukrainian and Polish nationalist journalism and poetry.

Finally in June 1906, Mykhailo Hrushevsky, a Ukrainian professor and nationalist from Lviv wrote an article titled "Unity or Disintegration". To Dushenko, this is the most developed form of the "prison of nations" metaphor:

The 'Principalities and Peoples' were dragged, like shackled slaves, behind the triumphant chariot of the ruling bureaucracy... The prison of nations grew and expanded its premises, increased its staff and salaries, and multiplied the army recruited from the dregs of the same. (...)
Now, when the rebellious people are breaking down the walls of the all-Russian Bastille, the jailers raise a cry, frightening the people with the fact that in case of its destruction, all these prisoners of “principalities and kingdoms,” “subjugated peoples” are ready to scatter. (...)
Representatives of the “subjugated peoples” respond with assurances that they do not intend to flee from the house of preliminary detention, in which they have been held until now, and will remain faithful to the unity and indivisibility of Russia. (...)
assurances, even oaths on shackles, given by slaves before their release, never inspire special trust.(...)
The prison of peoples can keep its residents only as long as it is locked and guarded; there are no voluntary residents in it.(...)
it is necessary to immediately embark on the path of creating such conditions... that would turn the cells of preliminary detention into free apartments, in which members of the state union would feel themselves full-fledged and free residents, not dependent prisoners.

In 1912, the Ukrainian parties of Galicia called for a Ukrainian university in Lviv. By this point Gruschevsky's metaphor had become popular in Ukrainian and Polish journalism and poetry.

All of Europe, the entire civilized world will not be safe until a dam is built against the predatory advance of tsarism to the West, until the peoples shackled by tsarism in chains of slavery gain the strength to crush the tsarist empire, this very terrible prison of peoples.

== Lenin ==
From the summer of 1912 to the summer of 1914, Lenin lived in Galicia. During this time, he was particularly interested in the national question, including the Ukrainian national movement, and it can be assumed that the formula “prison of nations” was borrowed by him from the Ukrainian or Polish journalism around him.

In December 1914 Lenin writes “On the National Pride of the Great Russians” (based on a draft speech for the banning of Shevchenko celebrations in April 1914), where Lenin calls for a Russian patriotism based around revolution, and says that patriotism cannot go hand in hand with the oppression of other peoples.

It would be unseemly for us representatives of a Great-Power nation in the far east of Europe, and a good share of Asia, to forget the enormous significance of the national question-particularly in a country which is justly called the "prison of nations"-at a time when it is precisely in the far east of Europe and in Asia that capitalism is rousing a number of "new" big and small nations to life and consciousness; at a moment when the tsarist monarchy has placed under arms millions of Great Russians and "aliens" for the purpose of "deciding" a number of national questions in the interests of the Council of the United Nobility' and of the Guchkovs and Kreslovnikovs, Dolgorukovs, Kutlers and Rodichevs.

== Soviet historiography ==
In "Russia as the Prison of Nations" (1930), Mikhail Pokrovsky wrote that direct coercion was applied most often by the Russian Empire in areas of expansion in the Far East, Caucasus, Central Asia, and Manchuria, as well as in western parts of the empire such as Poland, and "a great many Poles ended their lives in Siberia". Pokrovsky mentioned that Ukrainian, Belarusian, and Georgian schools did not exist and that in Polish schools the speaking of Polish language was penalized by depriving meals. Pokrovsky highlighted the history of the Jews as the most outcast in tsarist rule, due to the Pale of Settlement restricting where to live. Pokrovsky cited Lenin's idea that "the dictatorship of the serf-holding landowners was not only a reflection of our country's economic backwardness, it was also one of the causes of this backwardness. As it rested on outmoded forms of economy, it did not let the economy move forward at the same time. As long as it was not overthrown, [the Russian Empire] had to remain a backward agrarian country."

Soviet historians traditionally criticized tsarist policies, which included some usage of the phrase "prison of the peoples" after Lenin. On the other hand, historians have debated how much Stalin was willing to acknowledge the existence of Lenin's and Pokrovsky's "prison of the peoples" idea. The "Observations" were a set of messages sent in August 1934 to Soviet editors providing an official interpretation of history of the USSR, which became public with their publication to state organ Pravda in January 1936. The contents of these "Observations" have sometimes been seen by historians as a Stalinist willingness to acknowledge Lenin's observation. However, historian David Brandenberger disagreed based on the context and time of the original private publications earlier in 1934. In July 1934, Stalin sent a letter to the Soviet Politburo, arguing that Tsarist Russia should not be specifically criticized, because all European countries had been reactionary in the nineteenth century, rather than the Russian Empire alone. In light of Stalin's narrowing of the historiography, Brandenberger argued the important takeaway from "Observations" is not that they included the phrase "tsarism—prison of the peoples", but rather that they replaced the word "Russia" in an earlier turn of phrase with "tsarism" to narrow the target of critique to a form of government. While Stalin used some remaining rubric of internationalism, this shift served a more "pragmatic" interpretation of history, from the Soviet Kremlin's perspective, that began to reuse more elements of nationalism.

In January 1936, another history textbook commission was launched, this chaired by Andrei Zhdanov and including a number of top Communist Party functionaries, including Nikolai Bukharin, Karl Radek, Yakov Yakovlev, and Karl Bauman, among others. In conjunction with the work of this commission, Bukharin authored a lengthy critique of Pokrovsky and his methodology, accusing the deceased historian of mechanistic adherence to abstract sociological formulas, failure to properly understand and apply the dialectic method, and a tendency to depict history as a crudely universal process. The Zhdanov Commission, in consultation with Stalin, issued an influential communique which categorized historians of the Pokrovsky school as conduits of harmful ideas that were at root "anti-Marxist, anti-Leninist, essentially liquidatorist, and anti-scientific."

Pokrovsky's criticism of the old regime as a "prison of peoples" and "international gendarme" was henceforth deemed to be anti-patriotic "national nihilism" and a new Russian nationalist historical orthodoxy was established. This new official orthodoxy remained in place for the duration of Stalin's life and to some extent until the USSR's collapse.

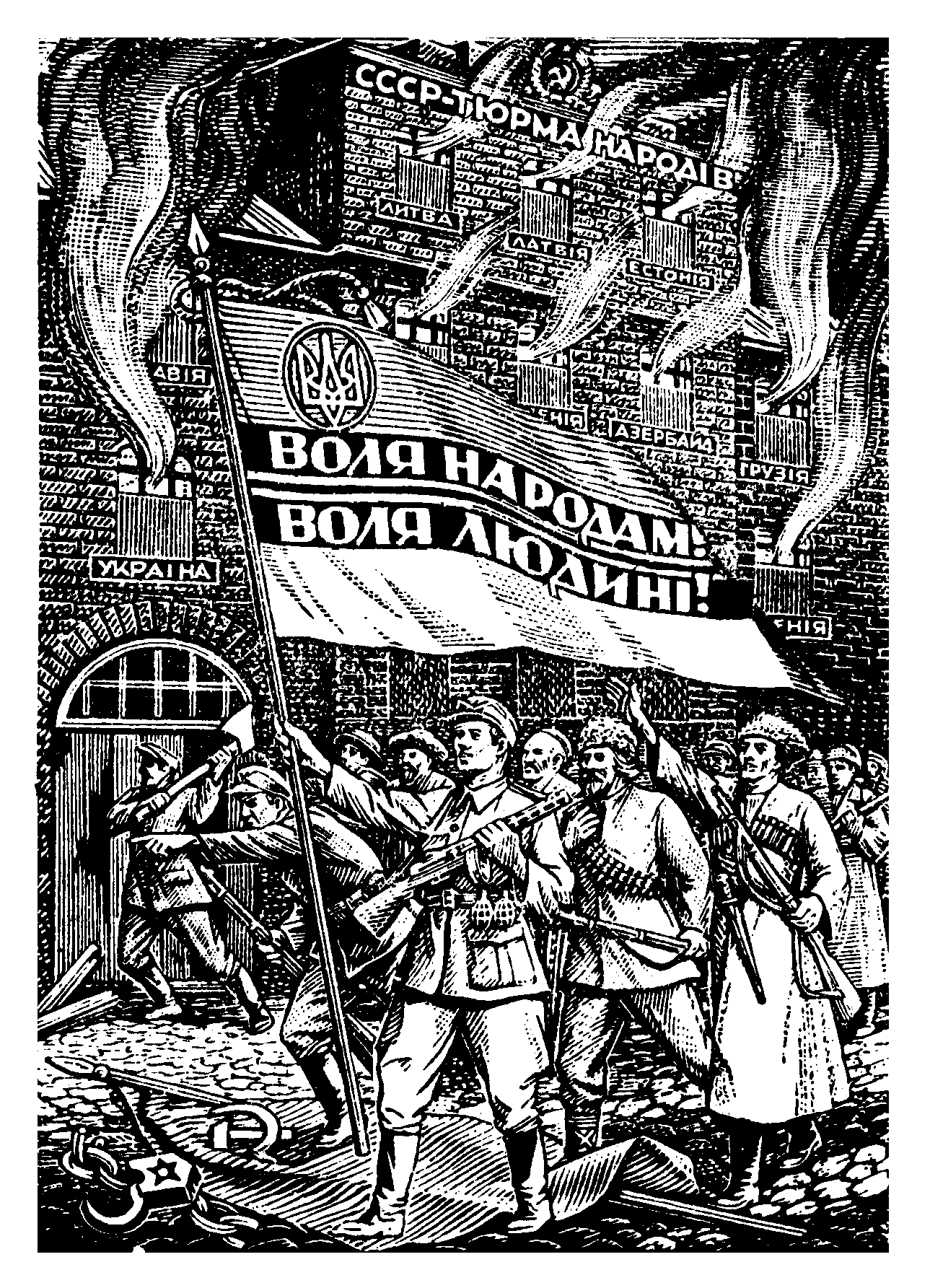
Ukrainian Insurgent Army propaganda poster depicting the USSR as a "prison of peoples".

Some historians evaluating the Soviet Union as a colonial empire, applied the "prison of nations" idea to the USSR. Thomas Winderl wrote: "The USSR became in a certain sense more a prison-house of nations than the old Empire had ever been."

== Bibliography ==
- David Brandenberger, "Politics Projected into the Past: What Precipitated the Anti-Pokrovskii Campaign?" in Ian D. Thatcher (ed.), Reinterpreting Revolutionary Russia: Essays in Honour of James D. White. Houndmills, England: Palgrave, 2006; pp. 202–214.
- Russia as the Prison of Nations M. N. Pokrovskii, Russia as the Prison of Nations. 1930 Original Source: 1905 god (Moscow: OGIZ Moskovskii rabochii, 1930). Reprinted in M. N. Pokrovskii, Izbrannye proizvedeniia (Moscow 1965–67), IV:129-35.
