= Marianne Koberwein =

Anna Maria "Marianne" Charlotta Koberwein née Rutenskiöld (Stockholm, 15 December 1791 - Pushkin, Saint Petersburg, August 2, 1856) was a Swedish and later Russian Empire courtier. She is known for her affair with Nicholas I of Russia.

She was the daughter of the Swedish nobleman Gustavus Adolphus Rutenskiöld (1758–1802) and daughter of an operasinger, cavalry quartermaster, actress Ulrika Charlotta Stenborg (b. 1772). She served as a lady-in-waiting to the Swedish queen Frederica of Baden, who was married to Gustav IV Adolf of Sweden, and when Gustav IV Adolf was deposed in 1809, she continued her service to Frederica in Karlsruhe.

She was subsequently employed by Frederica's sister Elizabeth Alexeievna (Louise of Baden), empress of Russia. At the Russian court, she became acquainted with, then heir presumptive and married, Nicholas I of Russia, with whom she had a daughter, Joséphine Youzia Koberwein (1825–1893): in parallel, she married in 1820's (Joseph) Vassiliévitch Koberwein (1789–1854), from whom she divorced soon after.

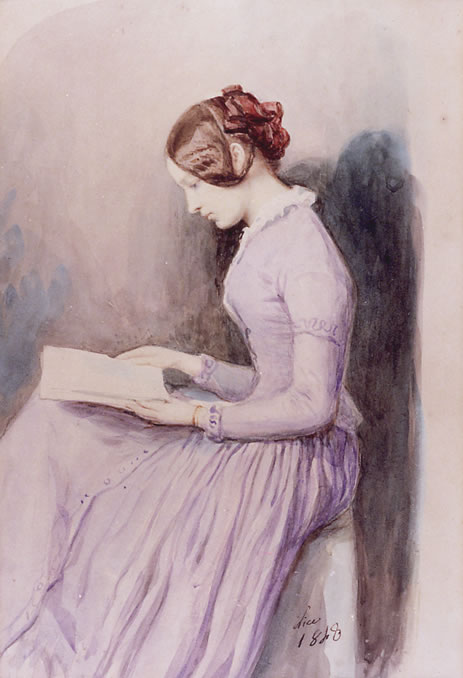
Fricero, Joseph - wife

Joséphine Youzia Koberwein was born on May 12, 1825, in the Smolensk province. Officially, Yuziya is the daughter of Joseph Vasilyevich (Osip Ventseslavovich) Koberwein, an undercover police agent. On January 3, 1849, she married the painter Joseph Fricero in Marseille. Just like him, she was engaged in painting. They had four sons: Alexander (1850–1904), Nikolai (1853–1884), Michael (1858–1914) and Emmanuel (1861–1880), whose descendants still live in Nice. She died on February 23, 1893, in Nice. She was buried in the Fricero family grave in the Russian cemetery in Nice.
