= La Russie en 1839 =

Book by French author Marquis de Custine

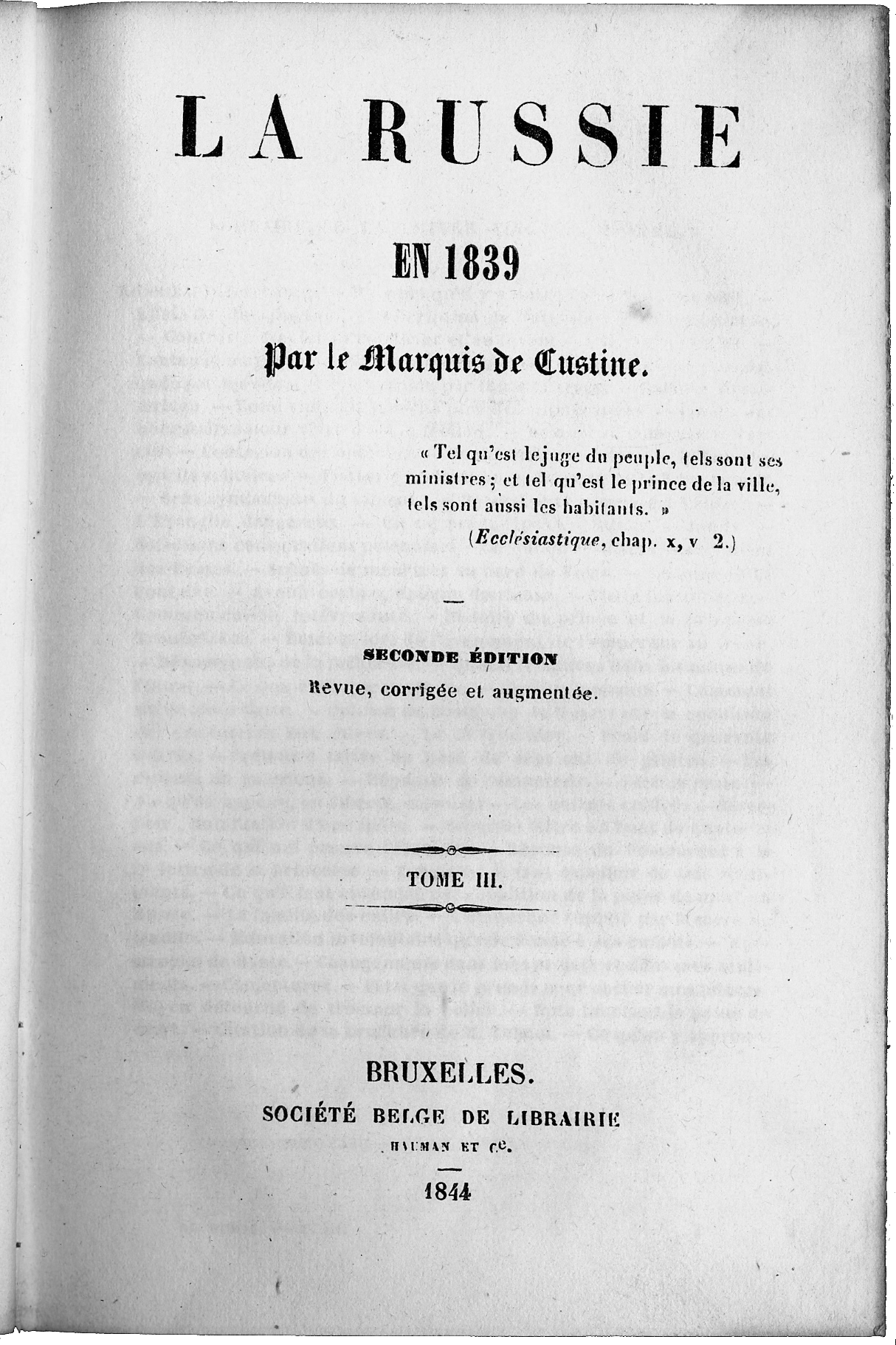
Cover sheet of an unauthorized 1844 Belgian printing of the book

La Russie en 1839 (French for Russia in 1839) is an 1843 book by French author Marquis de Custine. Highly critical of Russian society, it was banned there during the era of the Russian Empire. Due to this work, Custine was later dubbed by some historians as "the de Tocqueville of Russia". It was in this work that Custine described Russia as the "prison of the peoples".

== Background ==
Inspired by Tocqueville's work, Custine decided in late 1830s that Russia would be the subject of his next writing effort. Custine visited Russia in 1839, spending most of his time in St. Petersburg but also visiting Moscow and Yaroslavl, and based his work on his observations during that time.

== Contents ==
A political reactionary in his own country, fearful that democracy would inevitably lead to mob rule, Custine went to Russia looking for arguments against representative government but was appalled by autocracy as practiced in Russia and equally by the Russian people's apparent collaboration in their own oppression. He attributed this state of affairs to what he saw as the backwardness of the Russian Orthodox Church, combined with the disastrous effects of the Mongol invasion of medieval Russia, and the policies of Peter the Great. He was struck by the "smothering enormity of power and the randomness of everyday life and death".

Custine criticized St. Petersburg for being the creation of one man and not the result of spontaneous historical forces; at the same time, Custine loved Moscow architecture and predicted that Russia would be a great power if its capital were ever moved back to the older city. Most of Custine's mockery was reserved for the Russian nobility and Nicholas I. Custine said that Russia's aristocracy had "just enough of the gloss of European civilization to be 'spoiled as savages' but not enough to become cultivated men. They were like 'trained bears who made you long for the wild ones.'" Other tart and much-quoted observations included:

"In Russia, everything you notice, and everything that happens around you, has a terrifying uniformity; and the first thought that comes into the traveler's mind, as he contemplates this symmetry, is that such entire consistency and regularity, so contrary to the natural inclination of mankind, cannot have been achieved and could not survive without violence."

"The nature of its Government is interference, negligence and corruption. You rebel against the notion that you could become accustomed to all this, yet you do become accustomed to it. In that country, a sincere man would be taken for an idiot."

"A wealth of unnecessary and petty precautions here engenders a whole army of clerks, each of whom carries out his task with a degree of pedantry and inflexibility, and a self-important air solely designed to add significance to the least significant employment."

"The profession of misleading foreigners is one known only in Russia ... everyone disguises what is bad and shows what is good before the master's eyes."

Custine criticized Tsar Nicholas for the constant spying he ordered and for repressing Poland. Custine had more than one conversation with the Tsar and concluded it was possible that the Tsar behaved as he did only because he felt he had to. "If the Emperor has no more of mercy in his heart than he reveals in his policies, then I pity Russia; if, on the other hand, his true sentiments are really superior to his acts, then I pity the Emperor." Kennan wrote that Custine describes Russia as a horrible domain of obsequious flattery of the Tsar and spying. Custine said the air felt freer the moment one crossed into Prussia. In the mid-20th century, many commentators drew parallels between Custine's description of Russia and contemporary Soviet Union, as well as noticing many similarities between his character outline of Nicholas I and Joseph Stalin.

=== Publication and reaction ===
La Russie en 1839, first published in full in 1843, went through six printings and was widely read in England, France, and Germany but banned in Russia. Nevertheless, some books printed in France were smuggled in and made an impact on Russian society. From 1890 to 1891, fragments of the book were published in Russian journals. Poorly-abridged versions of the book were published in 1910 and in 1930 in the Soviet Union. Finally, an unabridged version was published in 1996. Several Russian authors published works critical of Custine's La Russie en 1839, among them Un mot sur l'ouvrage de M. de Custine, intitulé: La Russie en 1839 by Xavier Labenski (Jean Polonius) and Examen de l'ouvrage de M. le marquis de Custine intitulé "La Russie en 1839" (Paris, 1844) by Nicholas Gretsch.

Tsarist authorities sponsored a more scholarly investigation of Russia by a foreigner, August von Haxthausen, who authored the Studies on the Interior of Russia. This work can be interpreted as an attempt to provide an objective research of Russia's traditional social institutions, which the Tsar's advisors believed would effectively counter Custine's work. Studies was translated from German into French and English in 1848. The Tsar commissioned the French writer Hippolyte Auger to pen an extensive refutation; however, as the scandal of Custine's work had subsided by then, the Tsar decided it was best not to remind the public of the book, and the project was abandoned. Due to this work, Custine was later dubbed by some historians as "the de Tocqueville of Russia".
