= Royal Order of the Two-Sicilies =

Order of knighthood

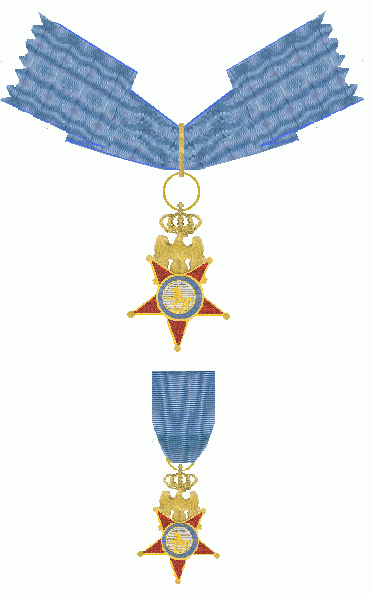
- Commander and Knight's badges of the Royal Order of the Two-Sicilies

Awarded by the King of Naples, the King of Two Sicilies, the Head of the House of Murat
- Type: Dynastic order of knighthood
- Established: 24 February 1808
- Awarded for: Important service to the former Kingdom of the Two Sicilies
- Status: (Suppressed 1819); Reactivated 2017

Precedence
- Next (higher): Order of Saint Ferdinand and of Merit
- Next (lower): Order of Saint George of the Reunion
- Ribbon of the Order

The Royal Order of the Two-Sicilies (Italian: Ordine reale delle Due Sicilie; French: Ordre royal des Deux-Siciles) is a dynastic order of knighthood, founded of the Kingdom of Naples and the Kingdom of Two Sicilies. The order was established 24 February 1808 by Joseph Bonaparte, who, at the time, was the King of Naples. The order was expanded and continued under the rule of Joachim Murat but was ultimately suppressed by Ferdinand I of the Two Sicilies in 1819. Those Knights of the Order of the Two-Sicilies who were still active were instead awarded the Order of Saint George and Reunion.

The order was revived in 2017 as a dynastic family order of the House of Murat, under the initiative of Joachim, 8th Prince Murat, who serves as its current grand master.

== Description ==
The decoration was a five-pointed red enameled gold star bearing the coat of arms of Naples and Sicily and the inscription Joseph Neapoles Siciliarum rex instituit. The original badge was surmounted by an eagle, but Ferdinand I modified it by replacing the eagle with the royal crown and changing the inscription to Ferdinandus Borbonius utriusque Siciliae Rex P.F.A..

== Recipients ==
- Commanders
  - Léonard Jean Aubry Huard de Saint-Aubin
  - Sextius Alexandre François de Miollis
