= Order of Saint George of the Reunion =

Order of knighthood

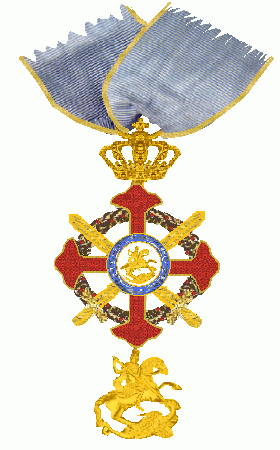
- Original badge of the order, 1819

Awarded by the Kingdom of the Two Sicilies
- Type: Dynastic order
- Established: 1 January 1819
- Awarded for: Military valor and merit
- Founder: Ferdinand I of the Two Sicilies

Precedence
- Next (higher): Royal Order of the Two-Sicilies
- Next (lower): Royal Order of Francis I
- Ribbon of the order

The Order of Saint George of the Reunion is an order of knighthood of the Kingdom of the Two Sicilies. It was established to replace the Royal Order of the Two-Sicilies.

It was created on 1 January 1819 by Ferdinand I of the Two Sicilies to reward military valor and merit. It received its name to celebrate the reunification of Naples and Sicily into one kingdom after the Congress of Vienna.

The dynastic dispute within the House of Bourbon-Two Sicilies means the position of Grand Master is disputed between Prince Pedro, Duke of Calabria and Prince Carlo, Duke of Castro. The head of the Spanish branch, Prince Pedro, considers this Order to be dormant and it is no longer awarded.

== Grades ==
During the time of the Kingdom of the Two Sicilies, the Order was divided into the following grades:

- Grand Collar (abolished 28 September 1829), with St George and the Dragon suspended from a collar, plus a star on the left breast;
- Grand Cross, with St George and the Dragon suspended from a badge under a crown on a necklet, plus a star on the left breast;
- Commander, with a badge under a crown on a necklet, plus a star on the left breast;
- Knight of Justice, with a badge on a necklet;
- Knight of Grace, with a badge without laurel wreath on a chest ribbon;
- Gold Medal on a chest ribbon;
- Silver Medal on a chest ribbon.

Knight	Commander	Knight Grand Cross

== Insignia ==
The badge of the Order is a red enameled lilied cross with in the middle a white enameled round plate bearing the image of a mounted St. George running the dragon through with his sword, bordered by a circle of blue enamel with the inscription "IN HOC SIGNO VINCES" and a laurel wreath.

The decoration of the Knights of Grand Cross has a golden image of St. George hanging down from the lower arm of the cross; the Royal Crown tops it.

== Recipients ==
- Knights
  - Leopold, Prince of Salerno
  - Giuseppe Saverio Poli
- Grand Cross
  - Ferdinand II of the Two Sicilies
  - Giustino Fortunato
  - Laval Nugent von Westmeath
  - Ludwig von Wallmoden-Gimborn

== See also ==
- Royal Order of Francis I
- Order of Saint Ferdinand and of Merit
- Order of Saint Januarius
- Sacred Military Constantinian Order of Saint George
