= Order of Saint Ferdinand and of Merit =

Order of knighthood of the Kingdom of the Two Sicilies

Illustrious Royal Order of Saint Ferdinand and of Merit
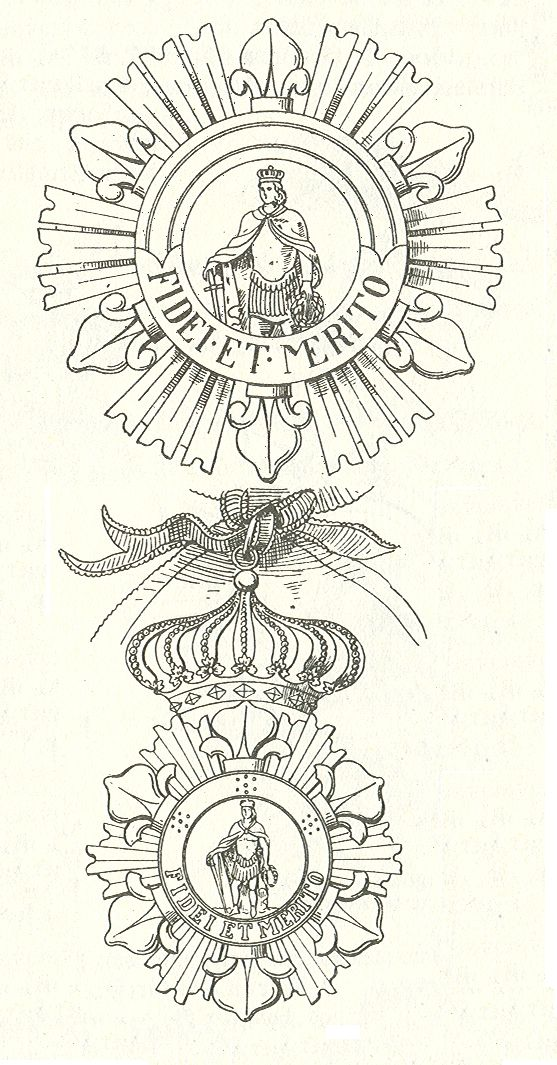
- Star and Badge of the Order

Awarded by the Kingdom of Two Sicilies
- Type: Dynastic order of knighthood
- Established: 1 April 1800
- Awarded for: Important deeds and with proof of loyalty to the Head of the Royal House and to the Royal Family

Precedence
- Next (higher): Sacred Military Constantinian Order of Saint George
- Next (lower): Royal Order of the Two-Sicilies
- Ribbon of the Order

The Illustrious Royal Order of Saint Ferdinand and Merit is an order of knighthood of the Kingdom of the Two Sicilies.

It was established on 1 April 1800 by Ferdinand IV of Naples and III Sicily to reward men who performed important deeds and gave proof of loyalty to the Head of the Royal House and to the Royal Family.

== Ranks and Insignia ==
The Order is divided into three Ranks:

- Knights of Grand Cross, with fess, cross and plate;
- Knights Commanders, with neck ribbon and cross;
- Knights, with ribbon and cross to the buttons.

Knight	Commander	Knight Grand Cross

The decoration is formed by a golden round shield bearing the image of St. Ferdinand, edged by a blue-enameled round plate with the inscription "FIDEI ET MERITO", bordered by six golden rays edged by six white enameled lilies. The ribbon is blue and edged in dark red.

== See also ==
- Royal Order of Francis I
- Order of Saint George and Reunion
- Order of Saint Januarius
- Sacred Military Constantinian Order of Saint George
