= List of longest-living members of the Spanish royal family =

This is a list of the longest-living members of the Spanish royal family, including those who held Spanish royal titles by birth, grant, or marriage. The list ranks individuals by verified lifespan, from longest to shortest. Among those listed, Infanta Alicia, Duchess of Calabria is the longest-lived member of the extended Spanish royal family, having lived to the age of 99 years and 135 days.

Among living members, the longest-lived female is Princess Teresa, Duchess of Salerno, and the longest-lived male member of the Spanish royal family is Juan Carlos I, King of Spain from 1975 to 2014.

This list includes members of the House of Bourbon and its related branches, such as the House of Bourbon-Two Sicilies, reflecting the dynastic ties that connect the Spanish royal family with other European royal houses.

== List ==
All persons are listed below by their Spanish royal titles by birth, grant, or by marriage. However, some of these individuals are better known by other titles.

Rank	Name (Note: As this is a list of Spanish royal family members, individuals are listed by their Spanish royal title by birth, grant, or by marriage.)	Portrait	Relation (Note: Those deriving their Spanish titles by birth are shown by relation "to" the parent from whose title theirs derived; those deriving their titles by marriage are shown by relation "to" the spouse to whom their marriage from whom the title automatically (for wives) or by grant derived)		Lifespan (Note: To maintain consistency within the table, the dates of birth and death are given in the New Style.)		Duration	
Rank	Name	Portrait	By	To	From	To	(days)	(years, days)
1	Infanta Alicia, Duchess of Calabria		Marriage	Infante Alfonso, Duke of Calabria	13 November 1917	28 March 2017	36,295	99 years, 135 days
2	Emmanuelle, Duchess of Anjou and Segovia		Marriage	Infante Jaime, Duke of Anjou and Segovia	8 November 1913	3 May 2012	35,971	98 years, 177 days
3	Infanta Eulalia, Duchess of Galliera		Blood	Isabella II	12 February 1864	8 March 1958	34,357	94 years, 24 days
4	Infanta Beatriz, Princess of Civitella-Cesi		Blood	Alfonso XIII	22 June 1909	22 November 2002	34,121	93 years, 153 days
5	Princess Teresa, Duchess of Salerno		Blood	Prince Carlos of Bourbon-Two Sicilies	6 February 1937	Living	32,794	89 years, 287 days
6	Princess María de las Mercedes, Countess of Barcelona		Blood	Prince Carlos of Bourbon-Two Sicilies	23 December 1910	2 January 2000	32,517	89 years, 10 days
7	Infante Alfonso, Duke of Galliera		Blood	Infante Antonio, Duke of Galliera	12 November 1886	6 August 1975	32,408	88 years, 267 days
8	Juan Carlos I		Blood	Infante Juan, Count of Barcelona	5 January 1938	Living	32,461	88 years, 319 days
9	Queen Sofía		Marriage	Juan Carlos I	2 November 1938	Living	32,160	88 years, 18 days
10	Princess Anne, Duchess of Calabria		Marriage	Infante Carlos, Duke of Calabria	4 December 1938	Living	32,128	87 years, 351 days
11	Infanta Margarita, Duchess of Soria and Hernani		Blood	Infante Juan, Count of Barcelona	6 March 1939	Living	32,036	87 years, 259 days
12	Princess Inés, Duchess of Syracuse		Blood	Infante Carlos, Duke of Calabria	18 April 1940	Living	31,627	86 years, 216 days
