= Marquess of Laserna =

Marquessate of Laserna
- Creation date: 8 April 2010
- Created by: Juan Carlos I
- Peerage: Peerage of Spain
- First holder: Iñigo Moreno y de Arteaga, 1st Marquess of Laserna
- Present holder: Iñigo Moreno y de Arteaga, 1st Marquess of Laserna
- Heir apparent: Rodrigo Moreno y Borbón-Dos Sicilias

Marquess of Laserna (Spanish: Marqués de Laserna) is a hereditary title in the Peerage of Spain, granted in 2010 by Juan Carlos I to Iñigo Moreno, husband of his cousin Teresa de Borbón-Dos Sicilias. It was conferred on him in compensation for his loss of the Marquessate of Laula in a judiciary battle against his namesake cousin Iñigo, 19th Duke of Infantado.

== Marquesses of Laserna (2010) ==
- Iñigo Moreno y de Arteaga, 1st Marquess of Laserna (b. 1934)

== See also ==
- Marquess of Laula
- Infanta Alicia, Duchess of Calabria
