= List of dukes in the nobility of Italy =

This is a list of extant dukedoms in the nobility of Italy. The Kingdom of Italy was dissolved in 1946 and the use of titles of nobility is not currently recognized or regulated by the Italian state. This list includes dukedoms in Italy which were created by sovereign rulers other than the King of Italy, such as the Holy Roman Emperor and the Holy See, as well as titles that originally belonged to the sovereigns of self-governing territories, such as the Duchy of Ferrara. It does not include Italian geographical titles created by French or Spanish rulers in the nobilities of their respective nations.

== Sovereign Grand dukes and Dukes (as of 1860) ==
Arms	Title	Date of creation	Creating sovereign	Current holder	Notes
	Grand Duke of Tuscany	27 August 1569	Pope Pius V	Archduke Sigismund of Austria	
	Duke of Parma	19 August 1545	Pope Paul III	Prince Carlos of Bourbon-Parma	
	Duke of Piacenza	19 August 1545	Pope Paul III	Prince Carlos of Bourbon-Parma	Subsidiary title of the Duke of Parma
	Duchy of Modena and Reggio	18 May 1452	Frederick III, Holy Roman Emperor	Prince Lorenz of Belgium, Archduke of Austria-Este	
	Duke of Guastalla	2 July 1621	Ferdinand II, Holy Roman Emperor	Prince Lorenz of Belgium	Subsidiary title of the Duke of Modena
	Duke of Massa	5 May 1664	Leopold I, Holy Roman Emperor	Prince Lorenz of Belgium, Archduke of Austria-Este	Subsidiary title of the Duke of Modena
	Duke of Mantua	25 March 1530	Charles V, Holy Roman Emperor	extinct	

== Royal dukes ==
Arms	Title	Date of creation	Creating sovereign	Current holder	Notes
	Duke of Aosta	30 May 1845	King of Sardinia	Prince Aimone of Savoy	
	Duke of Calabria	8 July 1747	Charles VII of Naples	Prince Pedro, Duke of Calabria	Subsidiary title of the King of Two Sicilies
	Duke of Castro	31 October 1537	Pope Paul III	Prince Carlo, Duke of Castro	Subsidiary title of the King of Two Sicilies
	Duke of Galliera	9 December 1888	Umberto I	Alfonso de Orléans-Borbón	
	Duke of Genoa	9 January 1815	King of Sardinia	Extinct 1996	
	Duke of Noto	4 January 1817	Infante Alfonso, Duke of Calabria	Prince Jaime of Bourbon-Two Sicilies	Main subsidiary title used by the heir apparent or heir presumptive to the throne of Two Sicilies
	Duke of Salerno	6 February 1937	Infante Alfonso, Duke of Calabria	Princess Teresa María of Bourbon-Two Sicilies	Substantive title of the Royal House of the Kingdom of Two Sicilies
	Duke of Spoleto	22 September 1904	King of Italy	Prince Aimone of Savoy	Subsidiary title of the Duke of Aosta
	Duke of Syracuse	18 February 1940	Infante Alfonso, Duke of Calabria	Princess Inés María of Bourbon-Two Sicilies	Substantive title of the Royal House of the Kingdom of Two Sicilies

== Non-royal dukes ==
Arms	Title	Date of creation	Creating sovereign	Current holder	Notes
	Duke of Acerenza	12 April 1593	King of Naples	Angelo Gennaro Granito Pignatelli	Subsidiary title of the Prince of Belmonte
	Duke of Addis Abeba	11 June 1936	Victor Emmanuel III	Flavio Badoglio, 3rd Duke of Addis Abeba	
	Duke of Bracciano	15 March 1803	Pope Pius VI	Don Giovanni Torlonia	Subsidiary title of the Prince of Civitella-Cesi
	Duke of Carcaci	27 March 1725	Charles VI, Holy Roman Emperor	Alessandro Paternò Castello, 13th Duke of Carcaci	
	Duke of Castel Duino	28 May 1934	Victor Emmanuel III	Carlo Alessandro, 3rd Duke of Castel Duino	Also Principe della Torre e Tasso
	Duke of Dino	9 November 1815	Ferdinand I	Maria Louisa Gonzalez de Andia	
	Duke of Gravina	1436		Domenico Napoleone II Orsini	
	Duke of Fiano	7 June 1621	Pope Gregory XV	Domenico Serlupi Crescenzi	
	Duke of Lodi	20 December 1807 (recognized 1890)	King of Italy	Benigno Melzi d'Eril	Also Duke of Melzi
	Duke of Melzi	5 September 1818	Francis II, Holy Roman Emperor	Benigno Melzi d'Eril	Also Duke of Lodi
	Duke of Morignano	30 May 1907	Victor Emmanuel III	Carlo Emanuele Ruspoli	
	Duke of Paliano	1519		Marcantonio VIII Colonna	Subsidiary title of the Prince of Paliano
	Duke of Poli and Guadagnolo	4 May 1820	Pope Pius VII	Don Giovanni Torlonia	Subsidiary title of the Prince of Civitella-Cesi
