= Alfonso, Duke of Calabria =

Alfonso, Duke of Calabria may refer to:

- Alfonso II of Naples (1448–1495), formerly Duke of Calabria
- Infante Alfonso, Duke of Calabria (1901–1964)
