= Princess Alice of Bourbon-Parma =

Princess Alice (Alicia) of Bourbon-Parma may refer to:

- Princess Alice of Bourbon-Parma (born 1849), daughter of Charles III, Duke of Parma and Princess Louise of Artois; married Ferdinand IV, Grand Duke of Tuscany
- Princess Alicia of Bourbon-Parma (1917–2017), daughter of Elias, Duke of Parma and Archduchess Maria Anna of Austria; married Infante Alfonso, Duke of Calabria
