= Marquess of Laula =

Marquessate of Laula
- Creation date: 25 August 1543
- Created by: Charles I
- Peerage: Peerage of Spain
- First holder: Adán Centurión Ultramarino y Negri, 1st Marquess of Laula
- Present holder: Carla María de Arteaga y del Álcazar, 13th Marchioness of Laula

Marquess of Laula (Spanish: Marqués de Laula) is a hereditary title in the Peerage of Spain, granted in 1543 by Charles I to Adán Centurión Ultramarino, Lieutenant General of the Galleys of Spain. It was bestowed along with the titles of "Marquess of Monte de Vay" and "Marquess of Vivola".

The 11th Marquess, Iñigo Moreno y de Arteaga, who is married to Princess Teresa, Duchess of Salerno, was deprived of the title by his first cousin Iñigo de Arteaga y Martín, 19th Duke of Infantado, in 2010. After a decade of a judiciary battle in court between the two, the Ministry of Justice ruled in favour of the latter, who ceded the title to his youngest daughter, Carla María de Arteaga, becoming the 13th Marchioness of Laula. The sentence was on the basis of absolute primogeniture.

== Marquesses of Laula (1543) ==
- Adán Centurión Ultramarino y Negri, 1st Marquess of Laula
- Juan Bautista Centurión Ultramarino y Negri, 2nd Marquess of Laula
- Adán Centurión Ultramarino y Fernández de Córdoba, 3rd Marquess of Laula
- Francisco Celilio Centurión y Guzmán, 4th Marquess of Laula
- José Centurión y Portocarrero, 5th Marquess of Laula
- Manuel Centurión y Arias Pacheco, 6th Marquess of Laula
- Juan Bautista Centurión y Velasco, 7th Marquess of Laula
- María Luisa Centurión y Velasco, 8th Marchioness of Laula
- Joaquín Ignacio de Arteaga y Echagüe, 9th Marquess of Laula
- María Belén de Arteaga y Falguera, 10th Marchioness of Laula
- Iñigo Moreno y de Arteaga, 11th Marquess of Laula
- Iñigo de Arteaga y Martín, 12th Marquess of Laula
- Carla María de Arteaga y del Álcazar, 13th Marchioness of Laula

== See also ==
- Marquess of Estepa
- Marquess of Laserna
