= Infanta Alicia, Duchess of Calabria =

Infanta Alicia
- Duchess of Calabria
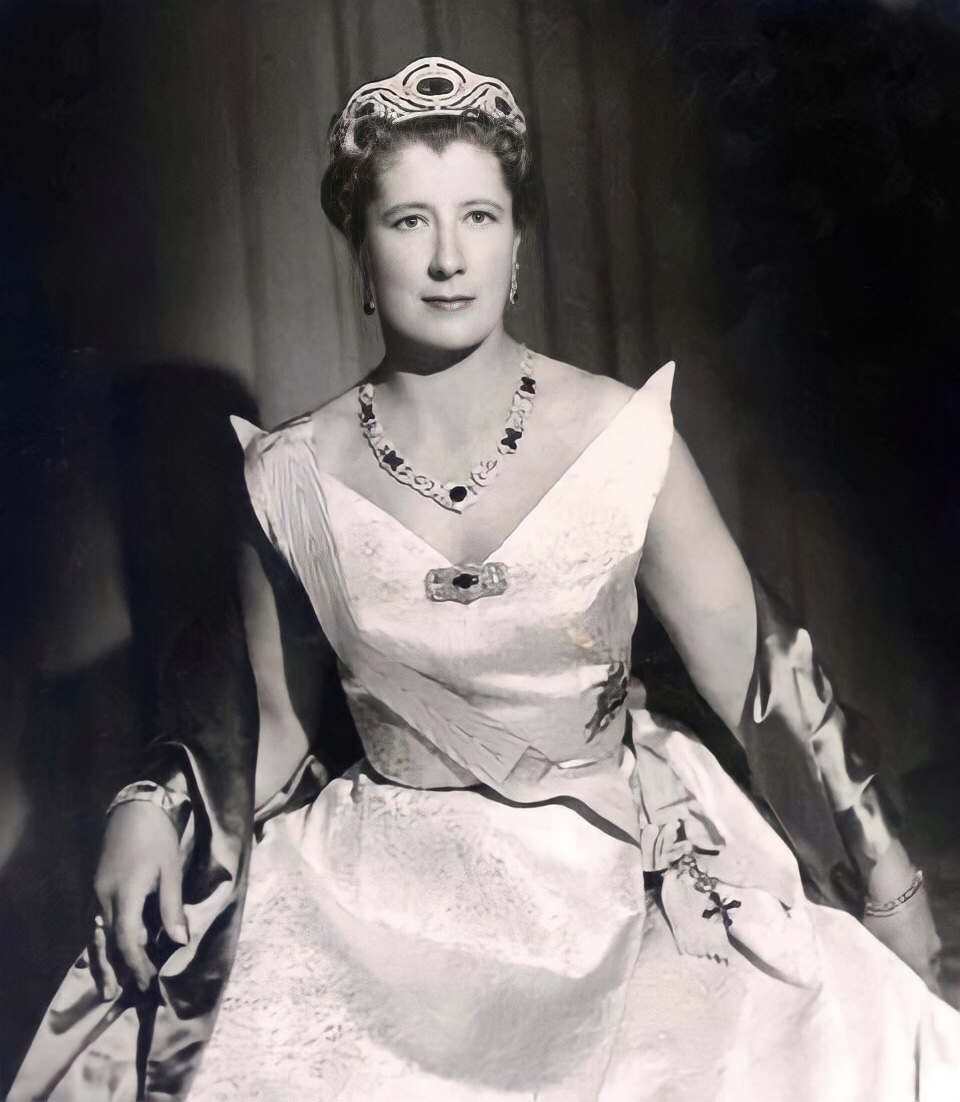
- Alicia, circa 1935
- Born: 13 November 1917; Vienna, Austria-Hungary
- Died: 28 March 2017 (aged 99); Madrid, Spain
- Burial: Royal Pantheon of Glashütten, Mönichkirchen
- Spouse: Infante Alfonso, Duke of Calabria (m. 1936; died 1964)
- Issue: Princess Teresa, Duchess of Salerno; Infante Carlos, Duke of Calabria; Princess Inés, Duchess of Syracuse
Names
- Alicia Maria Teresa Francesca Luisa Pia Anna Valeria
- House: Bourbon-Parma
- Father: Elias, Duke of Parma
- Mother: Archduchess Maria Anna of Austria

Infanta Alicia of Spain née Princess Alicia of Bourbon-Parma (Alicia Maria Teresa Francesca Luisa Pia Anna Valeria; 13 November 1917 – 28 March 2017) was a Spanish infanta. A member of the House of Bourbon-Parma, she became Duchess of Calabria through her marriage to Infante Alfonso, Duke of Calabria. She occasionally undertook official duties on behalf of the Spanish monarchy. She was the maternal aunt-in-law of King Juan Carlos I of Spain. She was the longest-lived Infanta of Spain.

== Early life ==
Princess Alicia of Bourbon-Parma was born in Vienna, Austria-Hungary. She was the seventh child and fourth daughter of Prince Elias of Bourbon-Parma and Archduchess Maria Anna of Austria. As a grandchild of Robert I, Duke of Parma, she was the paternal first cousin of Tsar Boris III of Bulgaria, and the paternal half-first cousin of Jean, Grand Duke of Luxembourg, Otto, Crown Prince of Austria and Queen Anne of Romania. From the age of 5, Alicia accompanied her father hunting in the family estates of Austria. She received her first hunting trophy, the Glasshatte, at the age of 12.

== Marriage and issue ==
On 16 April 1936, she married Prince Alfonso of Bourbon-Two Sicilies, Infante of Spain, nephew of ex-King Alfonso XIII of Spain, at the Minoritenkirche in Vienna. She would have become Queen of Spain if her husband's uncle had not had children. They had three children:

- Princess Teresa of Bourbon-Two Sicilies, Duchess of Salerno (6 February 1937); she married Iñigo Moreno y Arteaga, 1st Marquess of Laserna, formerly 12th Marquess of Laula, on 16 April 1961, had issue.
- Infante Carlos of Spain, Duke of Calabria (16 January 1938 – 5 October 2015); he married Princess Anne of Orléans on 11 May 1965, had issue. Succeeded his father as a claimant.
- Princess Inés of Bourbon-Two Sicilies, Duchess of Syracuse (18 February 1940); she married Don Luis de Morales y Aguado on 21 January 1965, had issue.

The couple settled first in Prépinson, south of Paris, and then in Lausanne, where their three children were born. In 1941, the couple settled in Spain and acquired La Toledana, an estate in Ciudad Real. In the 1950s and 60s, La Toledana became a meeting point for high society and European royalty. She was a pigeon shooting champion and was the only woman who hunted all the larger fauna in Spain. She founded the Flor de Lis company, which introduced canine species in Spain, such as the Teckel or the Deutsch Drathaar, whose breeding brought them succulent benefits.

== Later life ==
Alicia was widowed in 1964. She became a stubborn advocate of her son's claims to the titles of "Duke of Calabria" and his position as head of the House of Bourbon-Two Sicilies. She outlived her son by two years.

Despite not filing any claims about her rights, she was considered by some to be the lawful queen of Navarre.

She died on 28 March 2017 in Madrid, Spain, at the age of 99. King Felipe VI ordered the royal guard to watch over her coffin, which was draped with the Spanish flag. As an Infanta of Spain, she had the right to be buried in the Pantheon of the Princes at El Escorial. However, she was buried in the pantheon of the House of Bourbon-Parma in Austria, per her wishes. King Felipe VI and Queen Letizia, former King Juan Carlos and Queen Sofía attended her funeral at El Escorial.

== Honours ==
- Spain : 1190th Dame of the Order of Queen Maria Luisa –
- Dame Grand Cross of Justice of the Sacred Military Constantinian Order of Saint George (1960). –

=== Arms ===
Heraldry of Infanta Alicia

Coat of arms used as Spanish Infanta
(1936–1960)

Coat of arms used as Duchess of Calabria
(1960–1964)

Coat of arms used as Dowager Duchess
(1964–2017)

== Ancestry ==
Ancestors of Infanta Alicia, Duchess of Calabria

8. Charles III, Duke of Parma
4. Robert I, Duke of Parma
9. Princess Louise of Artois
2. Elias, Duke of Parma
10. Ferdinand II of the Two Sicilies
5. Princess Maria Pia of Bourbon-Two Sicilies
11. Archduchess Maria Theresa of Austria
1. Infanta Alicia, Duchess of Calabria
12. Archduke Karl Ferdinand of Austria
6. Archduke Friedrich, Duke of Teschen
13. Archduchess Elisabeth Franziska of Austria
3. Archduchess Maria Anna of Austria
14. Rudolf, 11th Duke of Croÿ
7. Princess Isabella of Croÿ
15. Princess Natalie of Ligne

Infanta Alicia, Duchess of Calabria House of Bourbon Cadet branch of the House of Capet Born: 13 November 1917 Died: 28 March 2017
Titles in pretence
Preceded by Maria Ludwiga Theresia of Bavaria	— TITULAR — Queen consort of the Two Sicilies; 7 January 1960 – 3 February 1964; Reason for succession failure: Italian Unification under the House of Savoy	Succeeded by Anne of Orleáns
