= Inés de Borbón-Dos Sicilias =

Spanish princess

Inés of Bourbon-Two Sicilies
- Duchess of Syracuse
- Born: 18 February 1940 (age 86); Lausanne, Switzerland
- Spouse: Luis de Morales y Aguado (m. 1965; div. 1978)
- Issue: Isabel de Morales y Borbón-Dos Sicilias; Eugenia de Morales y Borbón-Dos Sicilias; Sonia de Morales y Borbón-Dos Sicilias; Manuel de Morales y Borbón-Dos Sicilias; Mencía de Morales y Borbón-Dos Sicilias
Names
- Spanish: Inés María Alicia de Borbón-Dos Sicilias y Borbón-Parma
- House: Bourbon-Two Sicilies
- Father: Infante Alfonso, Duke of Calabria
- Mother: Princess Alicia of Bourbon-Parma

Royal styles of Princess Inés of Bourbon-Two-Sicilies
- Reference style: Her Royal Highness
- Spoken style: Your Royal Highness

Princess Inés of Bourbon-Two Sicilies, Duchess of Syracuse, GE (born 18 February 1940) is a Spanish princess, the youngest child of Infante Alfonso, heir to the throne of the Two Sicilies, and Infanta Alicia.

In 1978, she became the first member of the Spanish royal family to go through legal divorce, after gaining permission from her cousin King Juan Carlos I and Pope John Paul II.

Princess Inés was, at the time of her birth, 9th in line of succession to the Spanish throne.

== Early life ==
The last of three children and the second daughter of Infante Alfonso de Borbón-Dos Sicilias y de Borbón (1901–1964) and Princess Alicia of Bourbon-Parma (1917–2017), she was born during her parents' exile from republican Spain in Lausanne, Switzerland. Her father was the nephew of King Alfonso XIII of Spain.

== Family ==
Inés lived in Madrid with her family, and also spent time at her parents' finca, "La Toledana", a major hunting estate in Retuerta del Bullaque.

=== Marriage ===
Princess Inés intended to contract a forbidden marriage, according to her house laws, with Spanish lawyer Luis de Morales y Aguado (born 8 October 1933), a commoner.They had five children: Isabel, Eugenia, Sonia (1969–2022), Manuel, and Mencía de Morales y Borbón-Dos Sicilias.Inés separated from Morales two years after Mencía's 1975 birth, divorcing legally in 1978 with rare permissions from King Juan Carlos I and Pope John Paul II.

After the death of her father in 1964, and with persistence, she eventually married, in a ceremony that took place in San Jeronimo del Real on 30 January 1965. In the media, she was referred to as "the last great-grandchild of Alfonso XII of Spain". Both her cousin Prince Juan Carlos and his wife Princess Sofía attended, as well as the most distinguished Gotha of Europe.

=== Issue ===
The couple had five children:

- Isabel de Morales y Borbón-Dos Sicilias (born 10 April 1966), married to Joaquín Galán y Otamendi, with two daughters:
  - Carlota Galán y de Morales (born March 1998)
  - Inés Galán y de Morales (born 3 January 2000)
- Eugenia de Morales y Borbón-Dos Sicilias (born 14 December 1967), married to Iñigo Valdenebro y García de Polavieja, with three children
- Sonia de Morales y Borbón-Dos Sicilias (9 December 1969 – 26 July 2022), married to Alejandro García-Atance y Leurquin (born 1974), with two children
- Manuel de Morales y Borbón-Dos Sicilias (born 16 December 1971), married to Emma Ruiz de Azcárate y García de Lomas, with two children
- Mencía de Morales y Borbón-Dos Sicilias (born 25 November 1975)

== Honours ==
- Two Sicilies: Dame Grand Cross of the Sacred Military Constantinian Order of Saint George

== Heraldry ==
Heraldry of Princess Inés, Duchess of Syracuse

Coat of Arms as Princess of the Two Sicilies (1940-present)

Coat of Arms as Grandee of Spain (1940-present)

== See also ==
- List of current grandees of Spain
