= Duke of Syracuse =

Dukedom of Syracuse
- Creation date: 18 February 1940
- Created by: Infante Alfonso, Duke of Calabria
- First holder: Princess Inés of Bourbon-Two Sicilies
- Present holder: Princess Inés of Bourbon-Two Sicilies

Duke of Syracuse (Spanish: Duque de Siracusa) is a Spanish–Duosicilian royal life title that was created in 1940 in the defunct Peerage of the Two Sicilies by Infante Alfonso, heir to the throne of the Two Sicilies, for his newborn daughter Princess Inés. It makes reference to the city of Syracuse in the former Kingdom of the Two Sicilies. Although the original denomination was Count of Syracuse, it was elevated to a dukedom by the grantor.

== Dukes of Syracuse ==
- 1940–present Princess Inés, Duchess of Syracuse

== See also ==
- Duke of Salerno (1937 creation)
- List of dukes in the nobility of Italy
- Count of Syracuse (12th century)
- Tyrant of Syracuse (1st millennium BCE)
