= Teresa de Borbón-Dos Sicilias =

- Marquesa of Laserna
- Born: 6 February 1937 (age 89); Lausanne, Switzerland
- Spouse: Íñigo Moreno y Arteaga (m. 1961)
- Issue: 7
- House: House of Bourbon-Two Sicilies
- Father: Infante Alfonso, Duke of Calabria
- Mother: Princess Alicia of Bourbon-Parma

Teresa María de Borbón-Dos Sicilias y Borbón-Parma, Marquesa of Laserna (born 6 February 1937) is a princess of the House of Bourbon-Two Sicilies and a member of the extended Spanish royal family. She is the daughter of Infante Alfonso, Duke of Calabria and Infanta Alicia, Duchess of Calabria.

== Marriage and family ==
Teresa married Íñigo Moreno y Arteaga on 16 April 1961. The couple have seven children. Her husband was made Marques of Laserna by Juan Carlos I in 2010.
