= Duke of Salerno (1937 creation) =

Dukedom of Salerno
- Creation date: 1937
- Created by: Infante Alfonso, Duke of Calabria
- First holder: Princess Teresa María, Duchess of Salerno
- Present holder: Princess Teresa María, Duchess of Salerno
- Heir apparent: Rodrigo Moreno y Borbón-Dos Sicilias

Duke of Salerno (Spanish: Duque de Salerno) is a Spanish-Duosicilian royal title that was created in 1937 in the defunct Peerage of the Two Sicilies by Infante Alfonso, heir to the throne of the Two Sicilies, for his newborn heir presumptive child, Princess Teresa María. The title makes reference to the city of Salerno, in the former Kingdom of the Two Sicilies.

== Dukes of Salerno ==
- 1937–present Princess Teresa María

== See also ==
- Duke of Syracuse
- List of dukes in the nobility of Italy
