= Infante Alfonso, Duke of Calabria =

Infante Alfonso
- Duke of Calabria, Count of Caserta
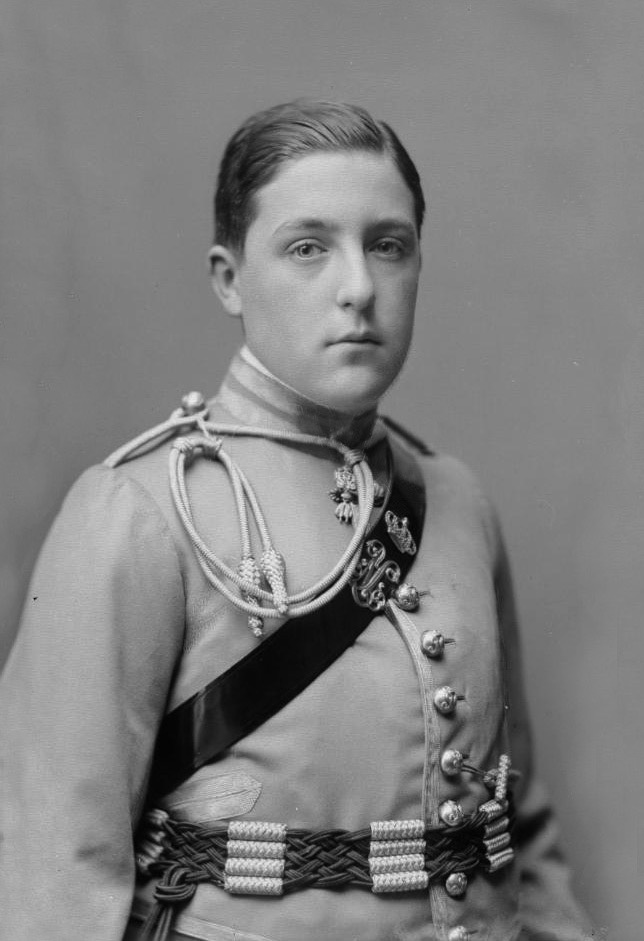
- Portrayed wearing the uniform of the Regimiento de Húsares de la Princesa, c. 1915

Head of the House of Bourbon-Two Sicilies (disputed)
- Tenure: 7 January 1960 – 3 February 1964
- Predecessor: Prince Ferdinand Pius
- Successor: Infante Carlos
- Born: 30 November 1901; Madrid, Spain
- Died: 3 February 1964 (aged 62); Madrid, Spain
- Burial: El Escorial, Spain
- Spouse: Princess Alicia of Bourbon-Parma (m. 1936)
- Issue: Princess Teresa, Duchess of Salerno; Infante Carlos, Duke of Calabria; Princess Inés, Duchess of Syracuse
Names
- Italian: Alfonso Maria Leo Christinus Alfonso di Liguori Antonio Francesco Saverio di Borbone delle Due Sicilie
- House: Bourbon-Two Sicilies
- Father: Prince Carlos of Bourbon-Two Sicilies
- Mother: María de las Mercedes, Princess of Asturias
- Religion: Roman Catholic

Infante Alfonso of Spain, Prince of the Two Sicilies, Duke of Calabria (30 November 1901 – 3 February 1964) was one of two claimants to the title of the head of the House of Bourbon-Two Sicilies from 1960 until his death in 1964. He was the son of Prince Carlos of Bourbon-Two Sicilies and María de las Mercedes, Princess of Asturias. He was born and died in Madrid, Spain.

Alfonso's mother was María de las Mercedes, Princess of Asturias, but she died in childbirth in 1904. Alfonso XIII, King of Spain, was unmarried at the time so as the Princess of the Asturias's eldest son, the young infante became heir presumptive to the Spanish crown, though, unlike his mother, he never held the title of Prince of Asturias. He was heir presumptive until the birth of his cousin, Alfonso, to Alfonso XIII and Queen Victoria Eugenie in 1907.

== Marriage and issue ==
Alfonso married Princess Alice of Bourbon-Parma (1917–2017), his second cousin, daughter of Elias, Duke of Parma and Piacenza, and Archduchess Maria Anna of Austria, on 16 April 1936 in Vienna, Austria. They had three children:

- Princess Teresa of Bourbon-Two Sicilies, Duchess of Salerno (born 6 February 1937), married to Íñigo Moreno y de Arteaga, 1st Marquess of Laserna (formerly 11th Marquess of Laula, born 18 April 1934), with seven children:
  - Rodrigo Moreno y Borbón-Dos Sicilias (born 1 February 1962), married in 2020 to Casilda Guerrero-Burgos y Fernández de Córdoba, 21st Duchess of Cardona (born 1982), with one child
  - Alicia Moreno y Borbón-Dos Sicilias (born 6 June 1964), married to José Luis Hernández y Eraso (born 1949), with two children
  - Alfonso Moreno y Borbón-Dos Sicilias (19 October 1965 – 18 May 2018), married to Marta Calvo y Molezún (born ca. 1970), with two children
  - Beatriz Moreno y Borbón-Dos Sicilias (born 10 May 1967), married to Lucas Urquijo y Fernández de Araoz (grandson of Alejandro Fernández de Araoz), with two children
  - Fernando Moreno y Borbón-Dos Sicilias (8 July 1969 – 12 May 2011)
  - Clara Moreno y Borbón-Dos Sicilias (born 14 June 1971)
  - Delia Moreno y Borbón-Dos Sicilias (born 30 August 1972), married to Álvaro de Ledesma y Sanchiz, 5th Marquis of Arecibo (born 20 October 1962), with two children
- Infante Carlos, Duke of Calabria (16 January 1938 – 5 October 2015), married to Princess Anne of Orléans (born 4 December 1938), with five children:
  - Cristina de Borbón-Dos Sicilias y Orleáns (born 16 March 1966), married to Pedro López-Quesada y Fernández-Urrutia (born 26 July 1963), with two children
  - María Paloma de Borbón-Dos Sicilias y Orleáns (born 5 April 1967), married to Archduke Simeon of Austria(born 26 June 1959), with five children
  - Pedro de Borbón-Dos Sicilias, Duke of Calabria (born 16 October 1968), married to Sofía Landaluce y Melgarejo (born 23 November 1973), with seven children:
    - Jaime de Borbón-Dos Sicilias y Landaluce, Duke of Noto (born 26 June 1992)
    - Juan de Borbón-Dos Sicilias y Landaluce (born 18 April 2003)
    - Pablo de Borbón-Dos Sicilias y Landaluce (born 26 June 2004)
    - Pedro de Borbón-Dos Sicilias y Landaluce (born 3 January 2007)
    - Sofía de Borbón-Dos Sicilias y Landaluce (born 12 November 2008)
    - Blanca de Borbón-Dos Sicilias y Landaluce (born 7 April 2011)
    - María de Borbón-Dos Sicilias y Landaluce (born 21 April 2015)
  - Inés de Borbón-Dos Sicilias y Orleáns (born 20 April 1971), married to Michele Carrelli Palombi (born 13 November 1965), with two children
  - Victoria de Borbón-Dos Sicilias y Orleáns (born 24 May 1976), married to Markos Nomikos (born 29 October 1965), with four children

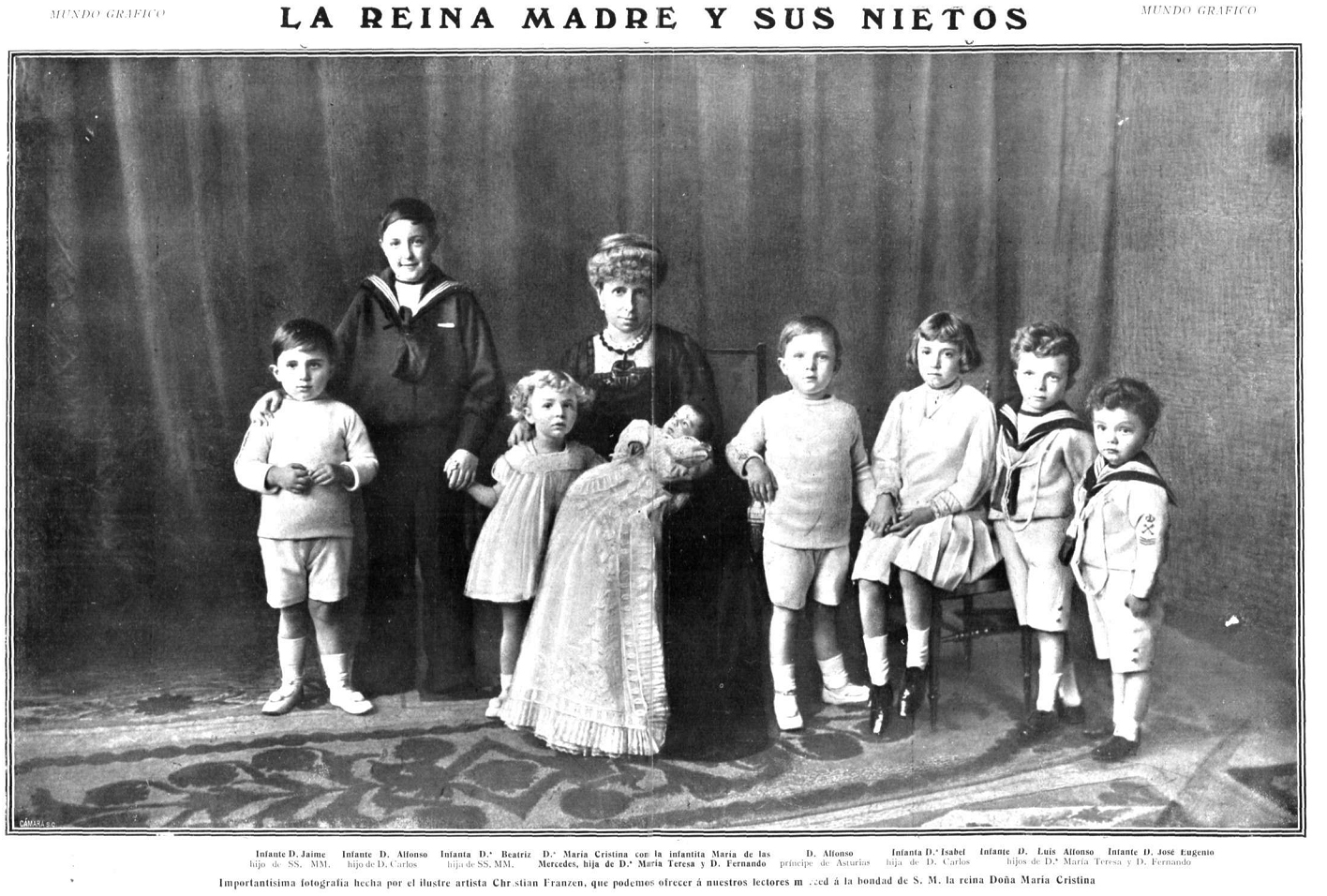
Alfonso (second from left) posing with his cousins and grandmother Queen Maria Christina, ca. 1911

- Princess Inés of Bourbon-Two Sicilies, Duchess of Syracuse (born 18 February 1940), married to Luis de Morales y Aguado (8 October 1933 – 10 November 2000), with five children:
  - Isabel de Morales y Borbón-Dos Sicilias (born 10 April 1966), married to Joaquín Galán y Otamendi, with two daughters:
    - Carlota Galán y Morales de Borbón-Dos-Sicilias (born March 1998)
    - Inés Galán y Morales de Borbón-Dos-Sicilias (born 3 January 2000)
  - Eugenia de Morales y Borbón-Dos Sicilias (born 14 December 1967), married to Iñigo Valdenebro y García de Polavieja, with three children
  - Sonia de Morales y Borbón-Dos Sicilias (9 December 1969 – 26 July 2022), married to Alejandro García-Atance y Leurquin (born 1974), with two children
  - Manuel de Morales y Borbón-Dos Sicilias (born 16 December 1971), married to Emma Ruiz de Azcárate y García de Lomas, with two children
  - Mencía de Morales y Borbón-Dos Sicilias (born 25 November 1975)

== Honours and arms ==
=== Orders and decorations ===
- Spain:
  - Knight of the Distinguished Order of the Golden Fleece, 1 December 1901
  - Grand Cross of the Royal and Distinguished Order of Charles III, with Collar, 1 December 1901
  - Grand Cross of the Royal Order of Isabella the Catholic, 1 December 1901
  - Knight of the Order of Alcántara, 13 April 1923

=== Heraldry ===
Heraldry of Prince Alfonso of Bourbon-Two Sicilies

Coat of Arms of Prince Alfonso of the Two-Sicilies as Infante of Spain (1907-1960)

Coat of Arms of Prince Alfonso as Duke of Calabria and Pretender (1960-1964)

== Ancestry ==
Ancestors of Infante Alfonso, Duke of Calabria

8. Ferdinand II of the Two Sicilies
4. Prince Alfonso, Count of Caserta
9. Archduchess Maria Theresa of Austria
2. Prince Carlos of Bourbon-Two Sicilies
10. Prince Francis, Count of Trapani
5. Princess Maria Antonietta of Bourbon-Two Sicilies
11. Archduchess Maria Isabella of Austria
1. Infante Alfonso, Duke of Calabria
12. Infante Francisco de Asís of Spain
6. Alfonso XII of Spain
13. Isabella II of Spain
3. María de las Mercedes, Princess of Asturias
14. Archduke Karl Ferdinand of Austria
7. Archduchess Maria Christina of Austria
15. Archduchess Elisabeth Franziska of Austria

Infante Alfonso, Duke of Calabria House of Bourbon-Two Sicilies Cadet branch of the House of Bourbon Born: 30 November 1901 Died: 3 February 1964
Italian nobility
Preceded by Ferdinand Pius	Duke of Calabria; 1960–1964	Succeeded by Carlos
Titles in pretence
Preceded by Ferdinand Pius	— TITULAR — King of the Two Sicilies; 1960–1964; Reason for succession failure: Italian Unification under the House of Savoy	Succeeded by Carlos
