= Juan Carlos I =

King of Spain from 1975 to 2014

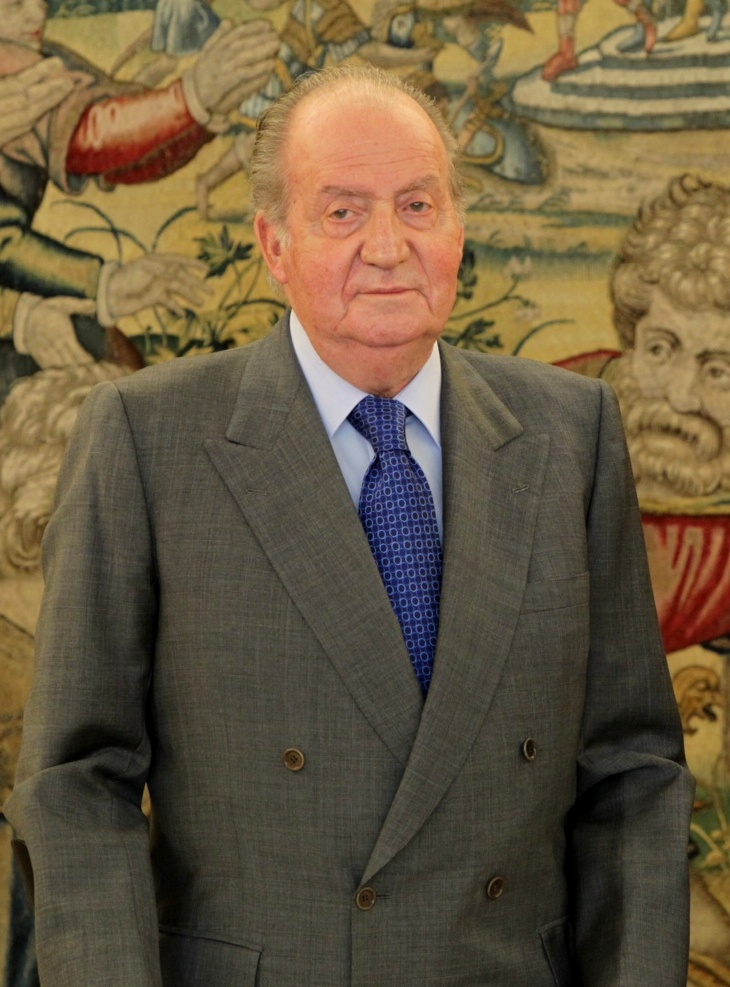
- Juan Carlos in 2013

King of Spain
- Reign: 22 November 1975 – 19 June 2014
- Enthronement: 27 November 1975
- Predecessor: Francisco Franco (as Caudillo) (Note: Alejandro Rodríguez de Valcárcel was acting head of state as President of the Regency Council between Franco's death on 20 November 1975 and Juan Carlos's proclamation two days later.); Alfonso XIII (as King)
- Successor: Felipe VI
- Born: 5 January 1938 (age 88); Rome, Kingdom of Italy
- Spouse: Sophia of Greece and Denmark (m. 1962)
- Issue: Infanta Elena, Duchess of Lugo; Infanta Cristina; Felipe VI
Names
- Juan Carlos Alfonso Víctor María de Borbón y Borbón-Dos Sicilias
- House: Bourbon
- Father: Infante Juan, Count of Barcelona
- Mother: Princess María de las Mercedes of Bourbon-Two Sicilies
- Education: Complutense University of Madrid

Juan Carlos I (Spanish: [xwaŋˈ kaɾlos]; (Note: In the other languages of Spain, his name is adapted as: Aragonese: Chuan-Carlos I, IPA: [tʃwaŋˈkaɾlos]; Asturian: Xuan Carlos I, IPA: [ʃuˈaŋ ˈkaɾlʊs]; Basque: Jon Karlos Ia, IPA: [joŋ karlos]; Catalan: Joan Carles I, IPA: [ʒuˈaŋ ˈkaɾləs]; Galician: Xoán Carlos I, IPA: [ʃoˈaŋ ˈkaɾlʊs]) Juan Carlos Alfonso Víctor María de Borbón y Borbón-Dos Sicilias; born 5 January 1938) is a member of the Spanish royal family who reigned as King of Spain from 1975 until his abdication in 2014. Although chosen by Francisco Franco as his successor, Juan Carlos helped dismantle the Francoist system and oversee the Spanish transition to democracy.

Juan Carlos is the son of Infante Juan, Count of Barcelona, and grandson of Alfonso XIII, the last king of Spain before the abolition of the monarchy in 1931 and the subsequent declaration of the Second Spanish Republic. Juan Carlos was born in Rome, Italy, during his family's exile. General Francisco Franco took over the government of Spain after his victory in the Spanish Civil War in 1939, yet in 1947 Spain's status as a monarchy was affirmed and a law was passed allowing Franco to choose his successor. Juan Carlos's father assumed his claims to the throne after former king Alfonso XIII died in February 1941. However, Franco saw Juan Carlos's father to be too liberal and in 1969 declared Juan Carlos to be Prince of Spain, his successor as head of state.

Juan Carlos spent his early years in Italy and came to Spain in 1947 to continue his studies. After completing his secondary education in 1955, he began his military training and entered the General Military Academy at Zaragoza. Later, he attended the Naval Military Academy and the General Academy of the Air, and finished his tertiary education at the University of Madrid. In 1962, Juan Carlos married Princess Sophia of Greece and Denmark in Athens. The couple have three children: Elena, Cristina, and Felipe. Due to Franco's advanced age and declining health amid his struggle with Parkinson's disease, Juan Carlos first began periodically acting as Spain's head of state in the summer of 1974. In November the following year, Franco died and Juan Carlos became king.

Juan Carlos was expected to continue Franco's legacy, but instead introduced reforms to dismantle the Francoist regime and to begin Spain's transition to democracy soon after his accession. This led to the 1977 general election, the first free election in Spain since 1936, followed by the approval of the Spanish Constitution of 1978 in a referendum which re-established a constitutional monarchy. In 1981, Juan Carlos played a major role in preventing a coup that attempted to revert to Francoist government in the King's name. In 2008, he was considered the most popular leader across all Ibero-America. Hailed for his role in Spain's transition to democracy, the King and the monarchy's reputation began to suffer after controversies surrounding his family arose, exacerbated by the public controversy centering on an elephant-hunting trip he undertook during a time of financial crisis in Spain.

In June 2014, Juan Carlos abdicated in favour of his son, who acceded to the throne as Felipe VI. Since August 2020, Juan Carlos has lived in self-imposed exile from Spain over allegedly improper ties to business deals in Saudi Arabia. The New York Times estimated in 2014 that Juan Carlos's fortune was around €1.8 billion ($2.3 billion). Juan Carlos is the second-oldest-living member of the Spanish royal family after Teresa de Borbón-Dos Sicilias.

== Early life ==
Juan Carlos was born on 5 January 1938 to Infante Juan, Count of Barcelona, and Princess María de las Mercedes of Bourbon-Two Sicilies in their family home in Rome, where his grandfather King Alfonso XIII and other members of the Spanish royal family lived in exile following the proclamation of the Second Spanish Republic in 1931. He was baptised as Juan Carlos Alfonso Víctor María de Borbón y Borbón-Dos Sicilias by Cardinal Eugenio Pacelli, the future Pope Pius XII. His elder sister was Infanta Pilar, Duchess of Badajoz (1936–2020) and his two younger siblings were Infanta Margarita, Duchess of Soria (born 1939) and Infante Alfonso (1941–1956). Within his familiar circle, he was commonly known as "Juan" or "Juanito", a diminutive of his first name.

Juan Carlos's early life was dictated largely by the political concerns of his father and General Francisco Franco. He moved to Spain in 1948 to be educated there after his father persuaded Franco to allow it. He began his studies in San Sebastián and finished them in 1954 at the Instituto San Isidro in Madrid. He then joined the army, doing his officer training from 1955 to 1957 at the Military Academy of Zaragoza. According to his sister Pilar in the documentary Yo, Juan Carlos I, rey de España, he had difficulty in his studies because of dyslexia.

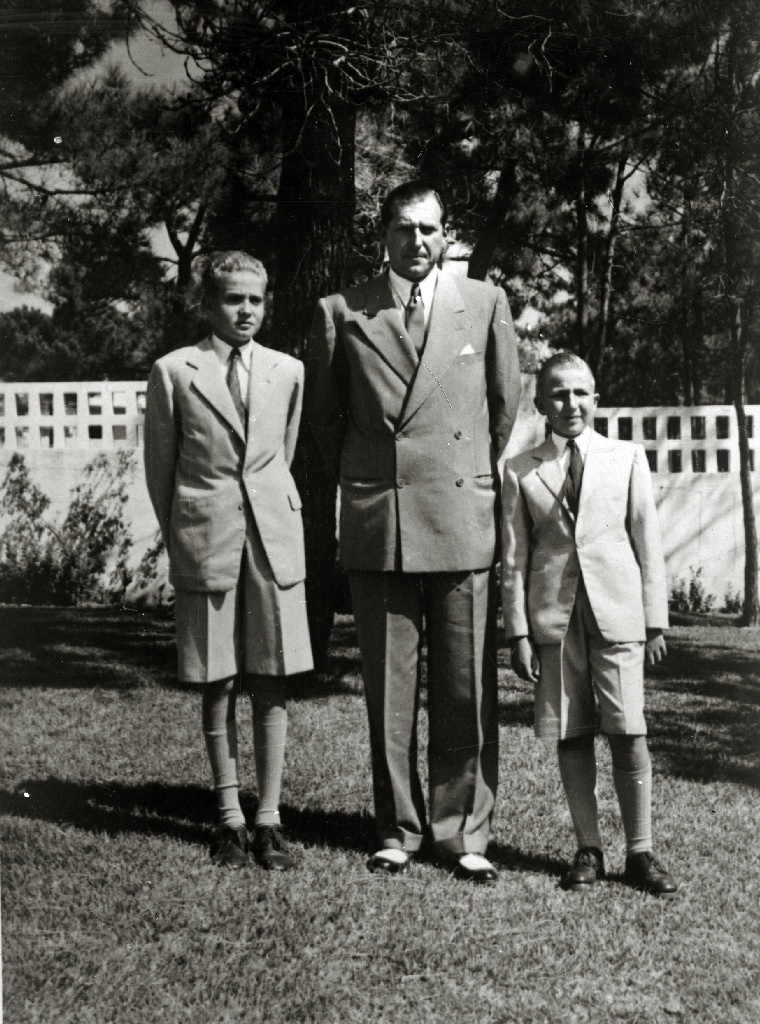
Juan Carlos (left) and Alfonso with their father Juan, Count of Barcelona, in 1950

Together with his parents and his sister Pilar, he took part in the ship tour organized by Queen Frederica and her husband King Paul of Greece in 1954, which became known as the "Cruise of the Kings" and was attended by over 100 royals from all over Europe. On this trip, Juan Carlos met the hosts' 15-year-old daughter, Sofia, his future wife, for the first time.

=== Brother's death ===
On the evening of Holy Thursday, 29 March 1956, Infante Alfonso died in a gun accident at the family's home Villa Giralda in Estoril, on the Portuguese Riviera. The Spanish Embassy in Portugal then issued the following official communiqué:

Whilst His Highness Prince Alfonso was cleaning a revolver last evening with his brother, a shot was fired hitting his forehead and killing him in a few minutes. The accident took place at 20.30 hours, after the Infante's return from the Maundy Thursday religious service, during which he had received holy communion.

Alfonso had won a local junior golf tournament earlier in the day, then went to evening Mass and rushed up to the room to see Juan Carlos who had come home for the Easter holidays from military school. Both Juan Carlos, age 18, and Alfonso, age 14, had been apparently playing with a .22LR Star Bonifacio Echeverria Automatic pistol owned by Alfonso. As they were alone in the room, it is unclear how Alfonso was shot, but according to Josefina Carolo, dressmaker to Juan Carlos's mother, Juan Carlos pointed the pistol at Alfonso and pulled the trigger, unaware that it was loaded. Bernardo Arnoso, a Portuguese friend of Juan Carlos, also said that Juan Carlos had told him he had fired the pistol not knowing that it was loaded, and adding that the bullet ricocheted off a wall, hitting Alfonso in the face. Helena Matheopoulos, a Greek author who spoke with the infantes' sister Pilar, said that Alfonso had been out of the room and when he returned and pushed the door open, the door knocked Juan Carlos in the arm, causing him to fire the pistol.

After learning this news, the Count of Barcelona reportedly grabbed Juan Carlos by the neck and shouted at him angrily, "Swear to me that you didn't do it on purpose!" Two days later, the Count sent his son back to the military academy. Following a later declaration of Juan Carlos's mother, Paul Preston argues that the content of the former testimony implies that Juan Carlos had pointed the gun at Alfonso, apparently not knowing that the gun was loaded, and pulled the trigger.

Juan Carlos himself did not refer to the incident firsthand until he published his memoir in 2025. He wrote that he and his brother "were having fun playing with a .22 caliber pistol", unaware that the gun was loaded when the bullet discharged and ricocheted before hitting his brother's forehead, adding that the latter died in his father's arms. Juan Carlos acknowledged that it was "difficult" for him to speak about the shooting, but added that he "thought about it every day".

=== Education ===
In 1957, Juan Carlos spent a year in the naval school at Marín, Pontevedra, and another in the Air Force school in San Javier in Murcia. In 1960–61, he studied law, international political economy and public finance at the Complutense University of Madrid. He then went to live in the Palace of Zarzuela and began carrying out official engagements.

== Family and private life ==
Juan Carlos first met Princess Sophia of Greece and Denmark in 1954, during a cruise organised by her parents King Paul and Queen Frederica of Greece. They married on 14 May 1962, firstly in a Roman Catholic ceremony at the Church of St. Denis, followed by a Greek Orthodox ceremony at the Metropolitan Cathedral of Athens. She converted from Greek Orthodoxy to Roman Catholicism. They have three children:

1. Infanta Elena, Duchess of Lugo (born 20 December 1963)
2. Infanta Cristina (born 13 June 1965)
3. King Felipe VI (born Infante Felipe, 30 January 1968)

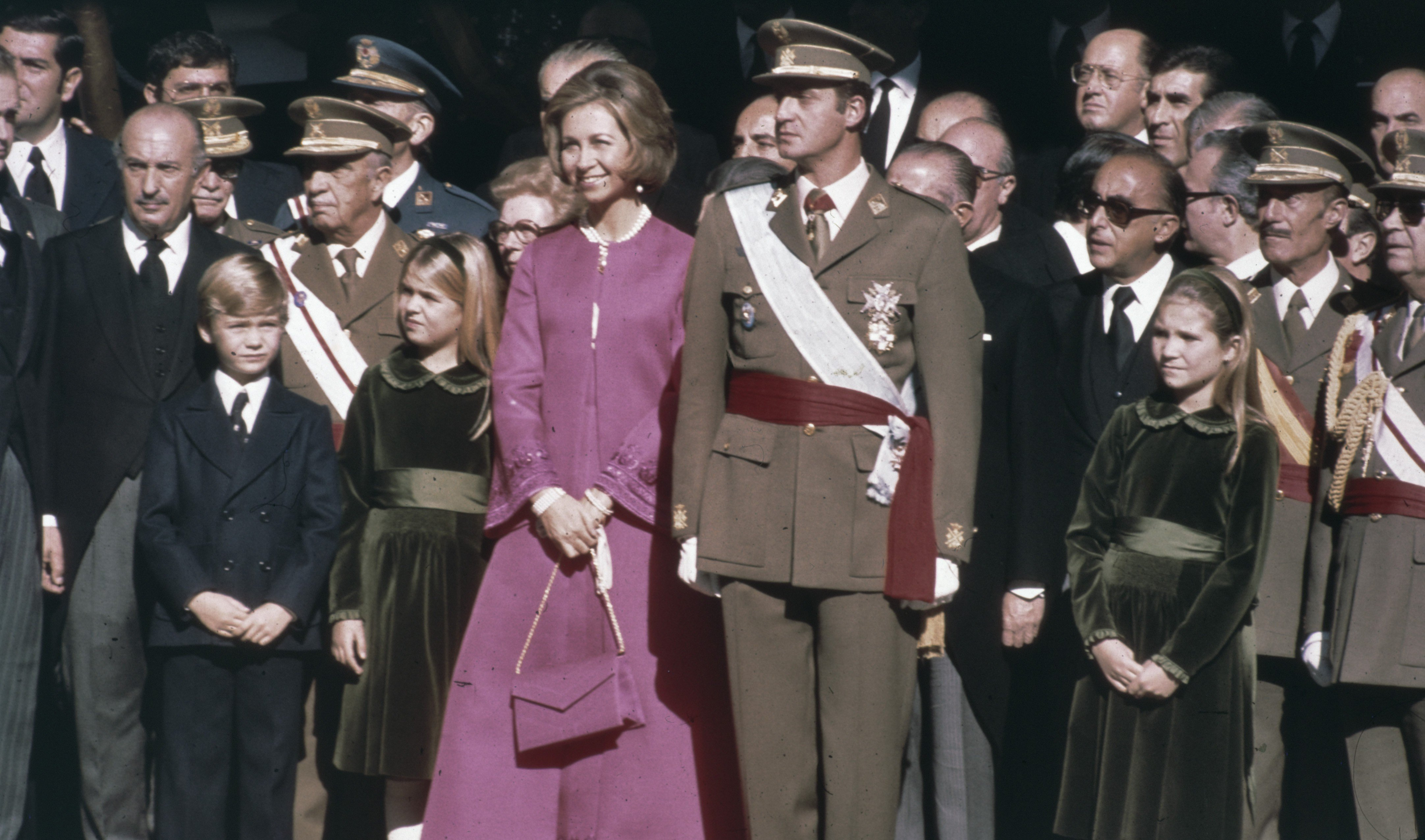
Juan Carlos, Sofía and their three children in 1975

Juan Carlos is also allegedly the father of waiter Albert Solà (1956–2022), a woman born in Catalonia in 1964, and of Ingrid Sartiau, a Belgian woman born in 1966 who filed a paternity suit after his abdication.

Juan Carlos is alleged to have had several extramarital affairs, which adversely affected his marriage. In 2021, the former police official José Manuel Villarejo testified that Juan Carlos was given hormones to reduce his sex drive, as it was seen as a state problem.

He is the godfather of Princess Eulalia d'Orléans Bourbon.

In 1972, Juan Carlos, a keen sailor, competed in the Dragon class event at the Olympic Games, finishing 15th. During their summer holidays, the whole family spends time at the Palace of Marivent (Palma de Mallorca) and on the yacht Fortuna, where they would take part in sailing competitions. The king has manned the Bribón series of yachts. In winter, the family often went skiing in Baqueira-Beret and Candanchú (Pyrenees). At present, his hobbies include classic sailing boats. He also hunts bears; in October 2004, he angered environmental activists by killing nine bears in central Romania, one of which was pregnant. In 2006, Russian regional authorities alleged Juan Carlos had shot a drunken tame bear named Mitrofan during a private hunting trip to Russia; the Royal Household denied this claim.

He is a member of the World Scout Foundation and of the Sons of the American Revolution.

== Prince of Spain ==
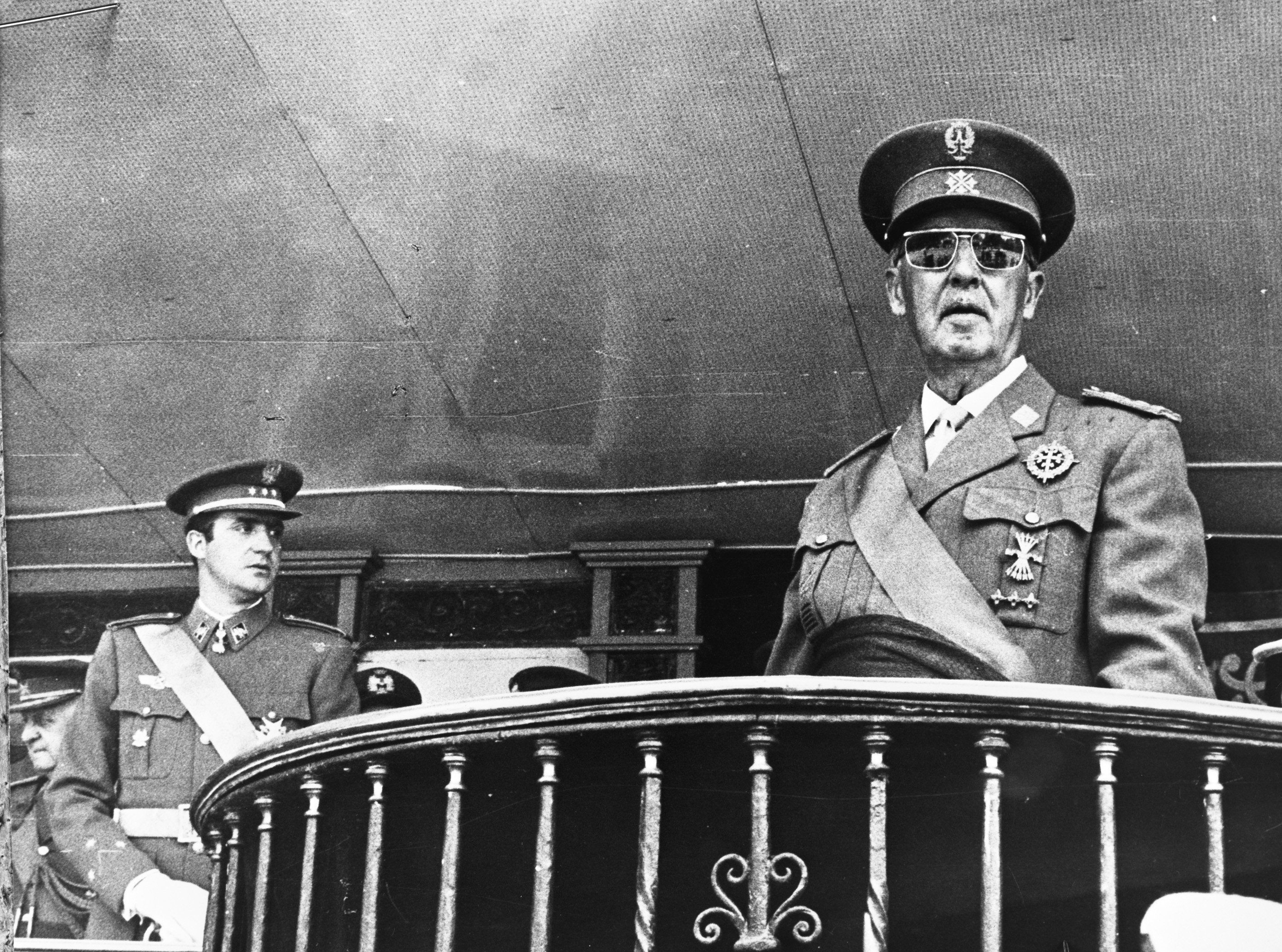
Juan Carlos and Francisco Franco in 1969

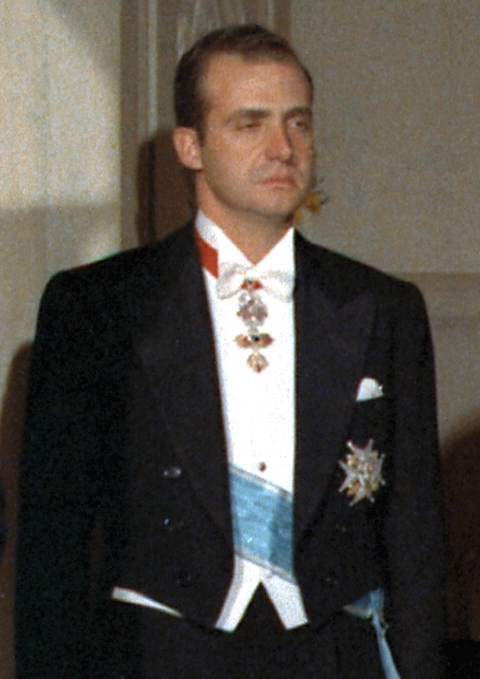
Juan Carlos in 1971

The dictatorial regime of Francisco Franco came to power during the Spanish Civil War, which pitted a government of democrats, anarchists, socialists, and communists, supported by the Soviet Union and international volunteers, against a rebellion of conservatives, monarchists, nationalists, and fascists, supported by both Hitler and Mussolini, with the rebels ultimately winning. Franco's authoritarian government remained dominant in Spain until the 1960s. With Franco's increasing age, left-wing protests increased, while at the same time, the far right factions demanded the return of a hardline absolute monarchy. At the time, the heir to the throne of Spain was Infante Juan, Count of Barcelona, the son of King Alfonso XIII. However, Franco viewed the Infante with extreme suspicion, believing him to be a liberal who was opposed to his regime.

Juan Carlos's first cousin Alfonso, Duke of Anjou and Cádiz, was also briefly considered as a candidate. Alfonso was known to be an ardent Francoist and married Franco's granddaughter, Doña María del Carmen Martínez-Bordiú y Franco, in 1972.

Ultimately, Franco decided to skip a generation and name Infante Juan Carlos as his personal successor. Franco hoped the young prince could be groomed to take over the nation while still maintaining the ultraconservative and authoritarian nature of his regime. In 1969, Juan Carlos was officially designated heir apparent and was given the new title of Prince of Spain (not the traditional Prince of Asturias). The rendering of his name as "Juan Carlos" (the first and second particles of his baptismal name) was a modification by choice of Franco. As a condition of being named heir apparent, he was required to swear loyalty to Franco's Movimiento Nacional, which he did with little outward hesitation. His choice was ratified by the Spanish parliament on 22 July 1969.

Juan Carlos met and consulted Franco many times while heir apparent and often took part in official and ceremonial state functions, standing alongside the dictator, much to the anger of hardline republicans and more moderate liberals, who hoped that Franco's death would bring in an era of reform. During 1969–1975, Juan Carlos publicly supported Franco's regime. Although Franco's health worsened during those years, whenever he did appear in public, from state dinners to military parades, it was in Juan Carlos's company. However, as the years progressed, Juan Carlos began meeting secretly with political opposition leaders and exiles, who were fighting to bring liberal reform to the country. He also had secret conversations with his father over the telephone. Franco, for his part, remained largely oblivious to the prince's actions and denied allegations from his ministers and advisors that Juan Carlos was in any way disloyal to his vision of the regime.

During periods of Franco's temporary incapacity in 1974 and 1975, Juan Carlos was acting head of state. On 30 October 1975, Franco gave full control to Juan Carlos. According to declassified CIA reports, during this time Juan Carlos secretly acquiesced and arranged the terms of the Green March – a coordinated mass demonstration by Moroccan civilians into the Spanish Sahara – with King Hassan II of Morocco, followed by the Madrid Accords handing over control of the territory to Morocco and Mauritania.

== Reign ==
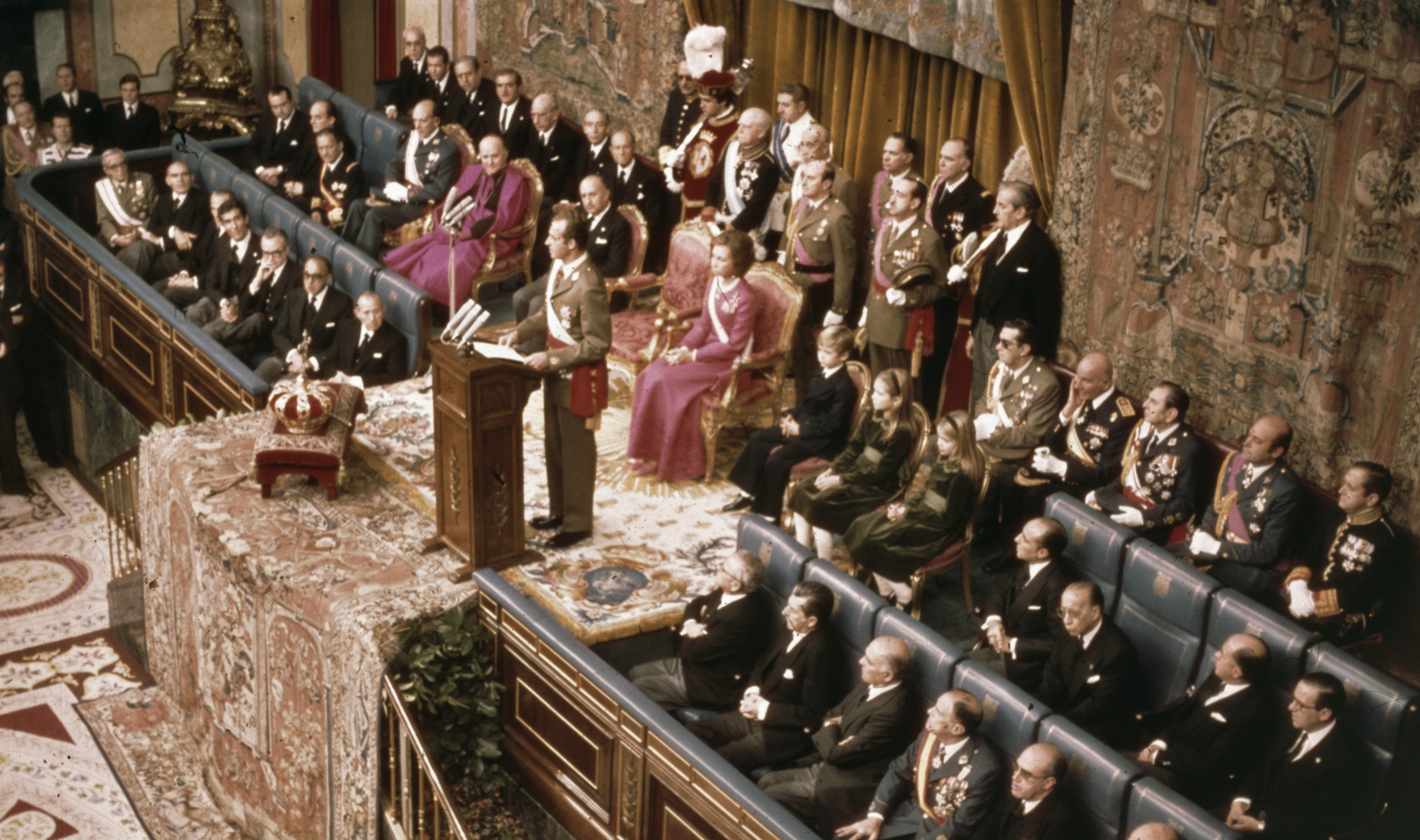
Proclamation as king at the Palacio de las Cortes on 22 November 1975

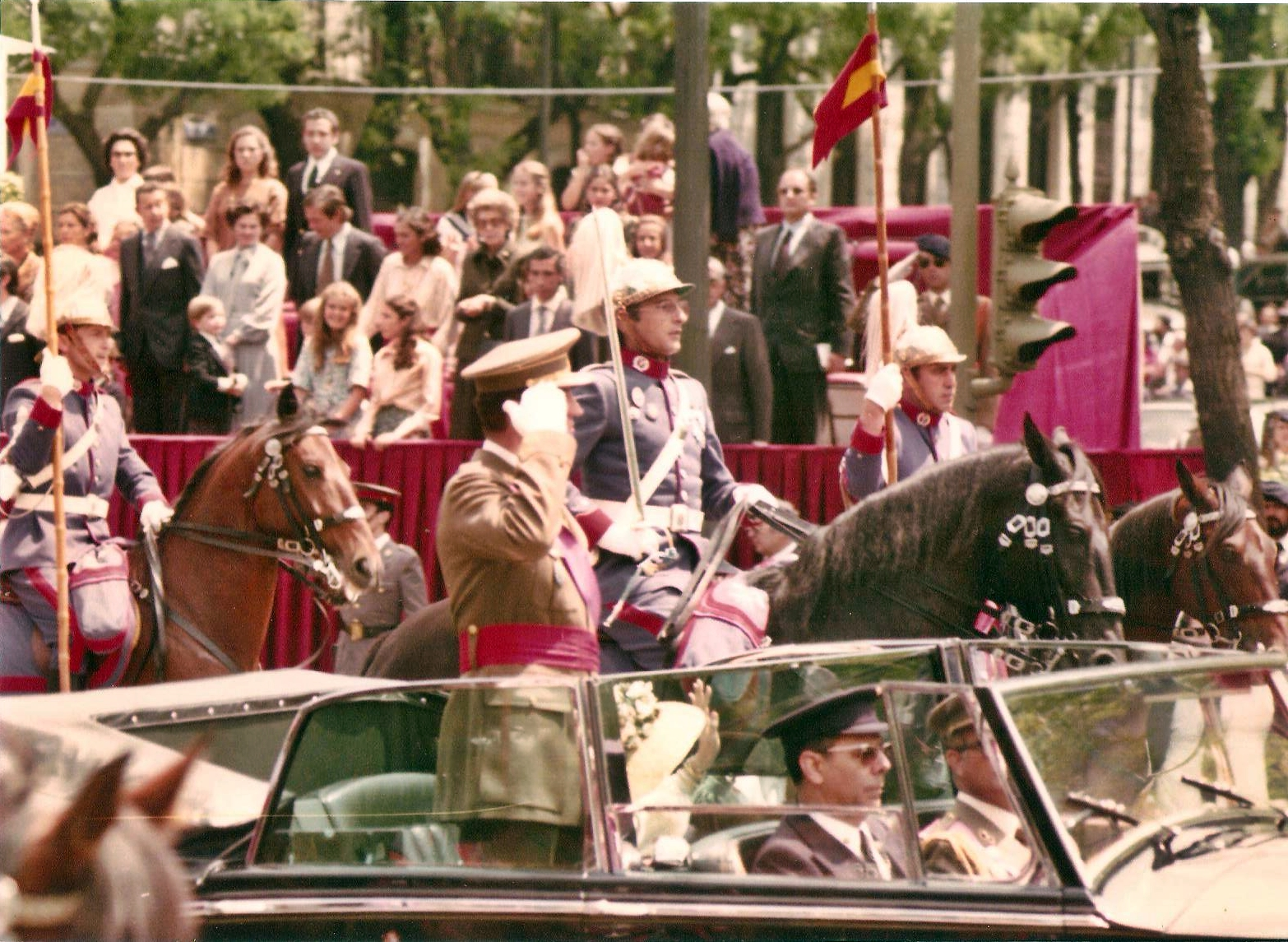
Juan Carlos in 1977

Franco died on 20 November 1975, and two days later on 22 November the Cortes Españolas proclaimed Juan Carlos King of Spain. In his address to the Cortes, Juan Carlos spoke of three factors: historical tradition, national laws, and the will of the people, and in so doing referred to a process dating back to the Civil War of 1936–39. He swore using the following formula: "I swear to God and the Gospels to comply and enforce compliance to the Fundamental Laws of the Realm and to remain loyal to the Principles of the National Movement". (Note: In the original Spanish: Juro por Dios y sobre los Evangelios cumplir y hacer cumplir las Leyes Fundamentales del Reino y guardar lealtad a los Principios del Movimiento Nacional.)

On 27 November, a Mass of the Holy Spirit was celebrated in the church of San Jerónimo el Real in Madrid to inaugurate his reign. He opted not to call himself Juan III or Carlos V, but Juan Carlos I. Juan Carlos is reported to have been pressured by Valéry Giscard d'Estaing to personally tell Chilean dictator Augusto Pinochet, who had traveled to Spain for Franco's funeral, not to attend his inauguration. In the end Pinochet did participate of the proclamation at the Palacio de las Cortes, Madrid but not in the follow-up Te Deum. In private Pinochet expressed later his disapproval of what he saw as a lack of recognition of Franco by Juan Carlos I in his speech at the Cortes.

=== Transition ===
Juan Carlos's accession was met with relatively little parliamentary opposition. Some members of the Movimiento Nacional voted against recognizing him, and even more voted against the 1976 Law for Political Reform. But a majority of Movimiento members supported both measures. Juan Carlos quickly instituted reforms, to the great displeasure of Falangist and conservative (monarchist) elements, especially in the military, who had expected him to maintain the authoritarian state.

In July 1976, Juan Carlos dismissed prime minister Carlos Arias Navarro, who had been attempting to continue Francoist policies in the face of the King's attempts at democratization. He instead appointed Adolfo Suárez, a former leader of the Movimiento Nacional, as prime minister.

Further legitimacy was restored to Juan Carlos's position on 14 May 1977, when his father (who had been recognized by many monarchists as the legitimate claimant to the Spanish throne during the Francoist era) formally renounced his claim to the throne and recognized his son as the sole head of the Spanish Royal House, transferring to him the historical heritage of the Spanish monarchy, thus making Juan Carlos both de facto and de jure king in the eyes of the traditional monarchists.

On 20 May 1977, the leader of the only recently legalized Spanish Socialist Workers' Party (PSOE), Felipe González, accompanied by Javier Solana, visited Juan Carlos in the Zarzuela Palace. The event represented a key endorsement of the monarchy from Spain's political left, who had been historically republican. Left-wing support for the monarchy had grown when the Communist Party of Spain was legalized on 9 April 1977, a move Juan Carlos had pressed for, despite enormous right-wing military opposition at that time, during the Cold War.

On 15 June 1977, Spain held its first post-Franco democratic elections. Juan Carlos had played a role as middleman in order to channel $10 million from the Shah of Iran to Adolfo Suárez's election campaign, reportedly asking the Shah for the money to "save Spain from Marxism". Suárez went on to win the election and become the first democratically elected leader of the new regime.

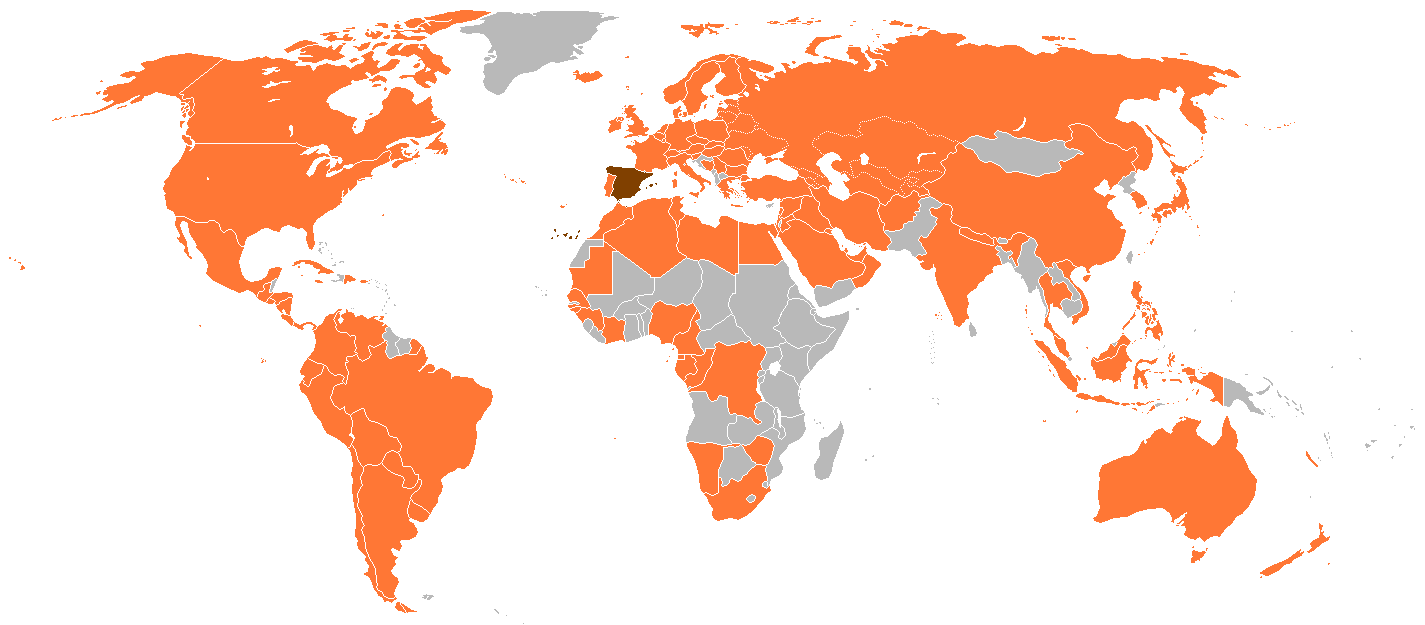
Royal trips of King Juan Carlos I

In 1978, the government promulgated a new constitution that acknowledged Juan Carlos as rightful heir of the Spanish dynasty and king; specifically, Title II, Section 57 asserted Juan Carlos's right to the throne of Spain by dynastic succession in the Bourbon tradition, as "the legitimate heir of the historic dynasty" rather than as the designated successor of Franco. The Constitution was passed by the democratically elected Constituent Cortes, ratified by the people in a referendum (6 December) and then signed into law by the King before a solemn meeting of the Cortes.

=== 1981 coup d'état attempt ===
An attempted military coup, known as 23-F, occurred on 23 February 1981, when the Cortes were seized by members of the Guardia Civil in the parliamentary chamber. During the coup, the King, wearing his uniform as Captain-General of the Armed Forces, gave a public television broadcast calling for unambiguous support for the legitimate democratic government. The broadcast is believed to have been a major factor in foiling the coup. The coup leaders had promised many of their potential supporters that they were acting in the King's name and with his approval, but were unable to demonstrate either, and the broadcast—coming just after midnight on the night of the coup—definitively showed the King's opposition to the coup makers.

When Juan Carlos became king, Communist leader Santiago Carrillo had given him the nickname "Juan Carlos the Brief", predicting that the monarchy would soon be swept away with the other remnants of the Franco era. After the coup attempt collapsed, in an emotional statement, Carrillo remarked: "Today, we are all monarchists." Public support for the monarchy among democrats and leftists, which had been limited before 1981, increased significantly following the king's handling of the coup.

However, this event remains controversial and has led to several alternative theories that cast doubt on the sincerity of the King's defense of democracy. The King had close ties with the leader of the rebellion, who had served him as Secretary General of the Royal Household. Above all, Juan Carlos and the main political parties were aware of a plan to put General Alfonso Armada in charge of the government, particularly in order to crack down on the Basque independence organization Euskadi ta Askatasuna (ETA). Although Juan Carlos strongly condemned the coup attempt—more than six hours after the armed guards invaded Congress—it is still difficult to establish whether he acted out of democratic conviction or because the operation was not going as well as expected, with little support. The reasons for the trial of the coup plotters are still classified. Antonio Tejero would later claim that Juan Carlos knew about the coup.

=== Later role in Spanish politics ===
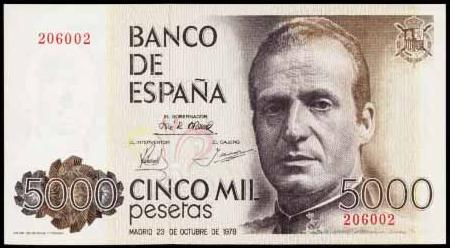
A 5,000 Spanish peseta note from 1979, bearing the image of Juan Carlos

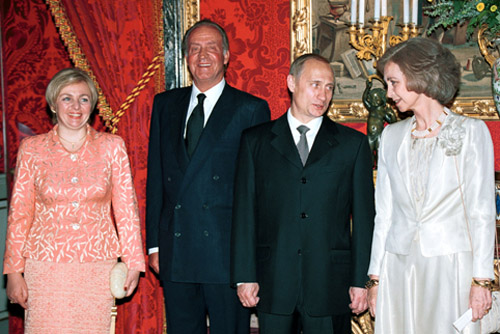
Juan Carlos and Sofía receiving Vladimir Putin and Lyudmila Putina, 2000

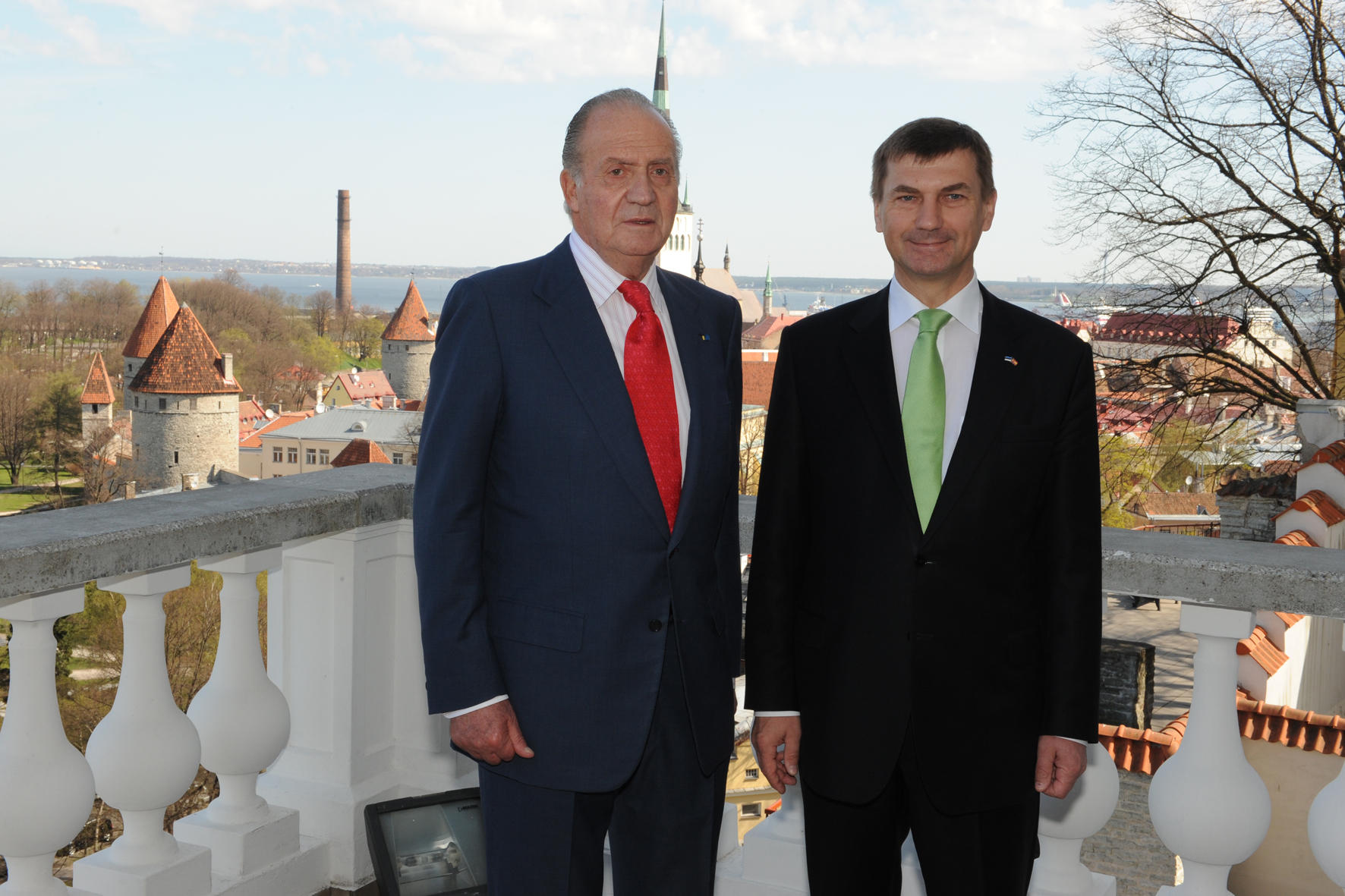
Juan Carlos with Estonian Prime Minister Andrus Ansip in Tallinn, May 2009

The victory of the PSOE in 1982 under González marked the effective end of the King's active involvement in Spanish politics. González governed for 14 years, longer than any other democratically elected Prime Minister. His administration helped consolidate Spanish democracy and thus maintained the stability of the nation.

On paper, Juan Carlos retained fairly extensive reserve powers. He was the guardian of the Constitution and was responsible for ensuring that it was obeyed. In practice, since the passage of the Constitution (and especially since 1982), he took a mostly non-partisan and representative role, acting almost entirely on the advice of the government. However, he commanded great moral authority as an essential symbol of the country's unity.

Under the Constitution, the King has immunity from prosecution in matters relating to his official duties. Consequently, he exercised most of his powers through the ministers; his acts as King (and not as a citizen) were not valid unless countersigned by a minister, who became politically responsible for the act in question.

As head of the Spanish state, Juan Carlos "held political power, gave his opinion and exerted his influence in the economic sphere, for example, in the area of company mergers or public policy during the transition period," analyses journalist Ana Pardo.

The honour of the royal family is specifically protected from insult by the Spanish Penal Code. Under this protection, Basque independentist Arnaldo Otegi and cartoonists from El Jueves were tried and punished.

As king, Juan Carlos gave an annual speech to the nation on Christmas Eve and was commander-in-chief of the Spanish armed forces.

In October 1990, Juan Carlos visited the Chilean city of Valdivia amidst the beginning of the Chilean transition to democracy. While he and the Queen were cheered by some, groups of indigenous Mapuches approached the King, some to protest past colonialism, and others to have the King ratify past Mapuche-Spanish treaties. According to El País political infighting between Mapuches prevented Juan Carlos from hosting an official meeting with Mapuche representatives.

In July 2000, Juan Carlos was the target of an enraged protester when former priest Juan María Fernández y Krohn, who had once attacked Pope John Paul II, breached security and attempted to approach the king.

When the media asked Juan Carlos in 2005 whether he would endorse the bill legalising same-sex marriage that was then being debated in the Cortes Generales, he answered "Soy el Rey de España y no el de Bélgica" ("I am the King of Spain, not of Belgium") – a reference to King Baudouin of Belgium, who had refused to sign the Belgian law legalising abortion. The King gave his Royal Assent to Law 13/2005 on 1 July 2005; the law legalising same-sex marriage was gazetted in the Boletín Oficial del Estado on 2 July, and came into effect on 3 July.

According to a poll in the newspaper El Mundo in November 2005, 77.5% of Spaniards thought Juan Carlos was "good or very good", 15.4% "not so good", and only 7.1% "bad or very bad". Even so, the issue of the monarchy re-emerged on 28 September 2007 as photos of the king were burned in public in Catalonia by small groups of protesters wanting the restoration of the Republic.

==== 2007 Ibero-American Summit ====
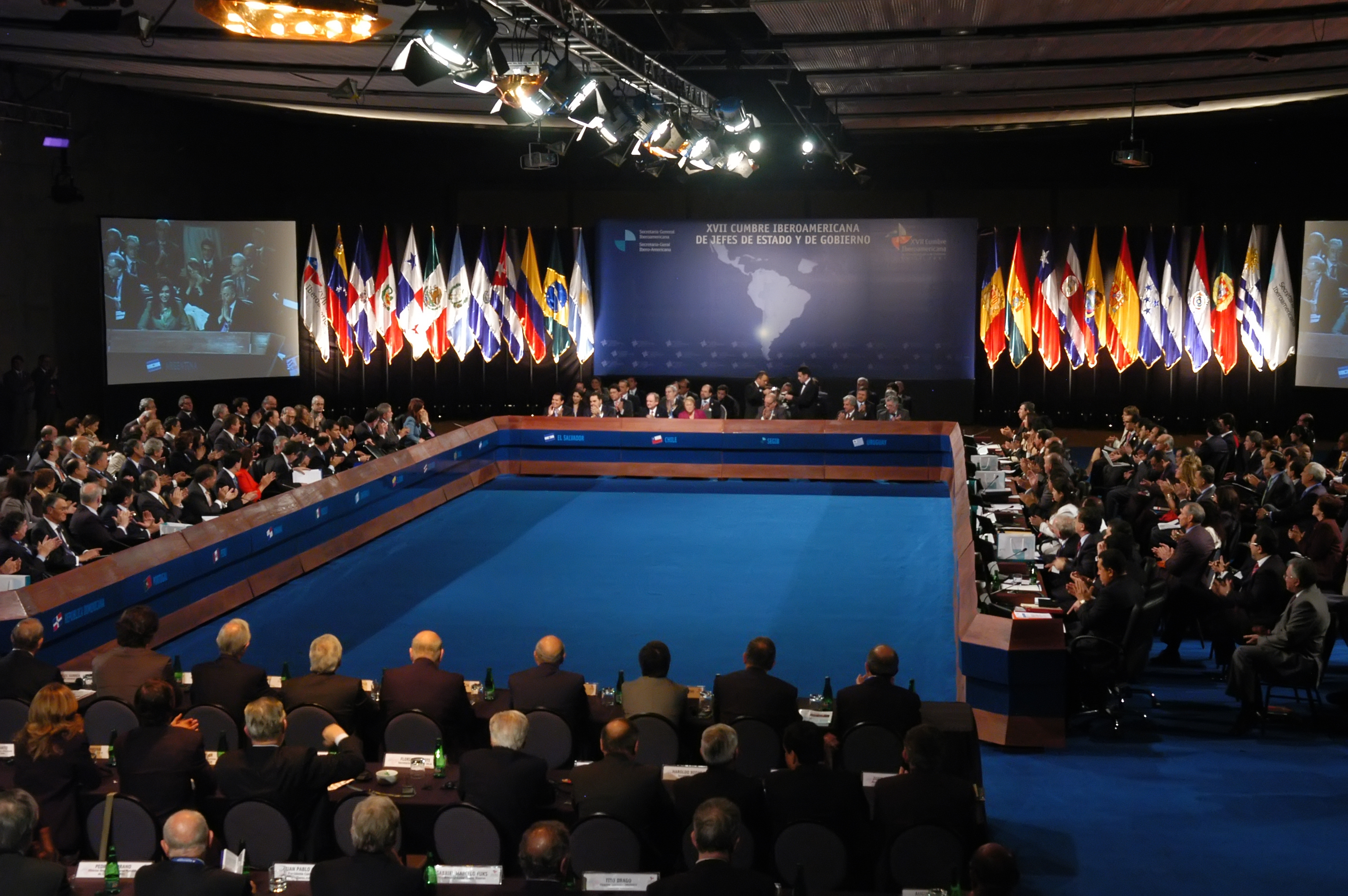
2007 Ibero-American Summit in Santiago de Chile

In November 2007, at the Ibero-American Summit in Santiago, during a heated exchange, Juan Carlos interrupted Venezuelan President Hugo Chávez, saying, "¿Por qué no te callas?" ("Why don't you shut up?"). Chávez had been interrupting the Spanish Prime Minister, José Luis Rodríguez Zapatero, while the latter was defending his predecessor and political opponent, José María Aznar, after Chávez had referred to Aznar as a fascist and "less human than snakes". The King shortly afterwards left the hall when President Daniel Ortega of Nicaragua accused Spain of intervention in his country's elections and complained about some Spanish energy companies working in Nicaragua. This was an unprecedented diplomatic incident and a rare display of public anger by the King.

==== Budget of the royal house ====
Juan Carlos detailed for the first time in 2011 the yearly royal budget of €8.3 million, excluding expenses such as the electricity bill, paid by the State.

==== Botswana hunting trip ====
In April 2012, Juan Carlos faced criticism for an elephant-hunting trip in Botswana. The public found out about the trip only after the King injured himself and a special aircraft was sent to bring him home. Spanish officials stated that the expenses of the trip were not paid by taxpayers or by the palace, but by Mohamed Eyad Kayali, a businessman of Syrian origin. Cayo Lara Moya of the United Left party said the King's trip "demonstrated a lack of ethics and respect toward many people in this country who are suffering a lot" while Tomás Gómez of the Spanish Socialist Workers' Party (PSOE). said Juan Carlos should choose between "public responsibilities or an abdication". In April 2012, Spain's unemployment was at 23% and nearly 50% for young workers. El País estimated the total cost of a hunting trip at €44,000, about twice the average annual salary in Spain. A petition called for the king to resign from his position as honorary president of the Spanish branch of the World Wide Fund for Nature. The WWF itself responded by asking for an interview with the King to resolve the situation. In July 2012, WWF Spain held a meeting in Madrid and decided with 226 votes to 13 to remove the King from its honorary presidency. He later apologised for the hunting trip.

Up until the Botswana elephant trip, Juan Carlos had enjoyed a high level of shielding from media scrutiny, described as "rare among Western leaders".

=== Interfaith work ===
On the 500th anniversary of the Alhambra Decree in 1992, King Juan Carlos I and Queen Sofia visited the Beth Yaacov Synagogue in Madrid, led by Chief Rabbi of Madrid Yehuda Benasouli to commemorate the occasion. While Sofia had been to the synagogue in the 1970s, the occasion marked the first time that the king had visited a synagogue in Spain. The Spanish royals were joined by Israeli President Chaim Herzog, Herzog's predecessor Yitzhak Navon, Rabbi Solomon Gaon and other Israeli and Spanish officials. Also present were descendants of Abraham Senior and Isaac Abarbanel, who had unsuccessfully petitioned King Ferdinand and Queen Isabella to retract the edict.

In 2008, Juan Carlos spoke at the opening of a 3-day Saudi-sponsored World Conference on Dialogue interfaith conference at the Royal Palace of El Pardo outside Madrid. The conference was attended by King Abdullah of Saudi Arabia, Rabbi David Rosen, and former British Prime Minister Tony Blair.

=== Abdication ===
Spanish news media started to speculate about the King's future in 2013, following public criticism over his taking an elephant hunting safari in Botswana and an embezzlement scandal involving his daughter, Infanta Cristina, Duchess of Palma de Mallorca, and her husband Iñaki Urdangarin. The King's private secretary, Rafael Spottorno, denied in a briefing that the "abdication option" was being considered.

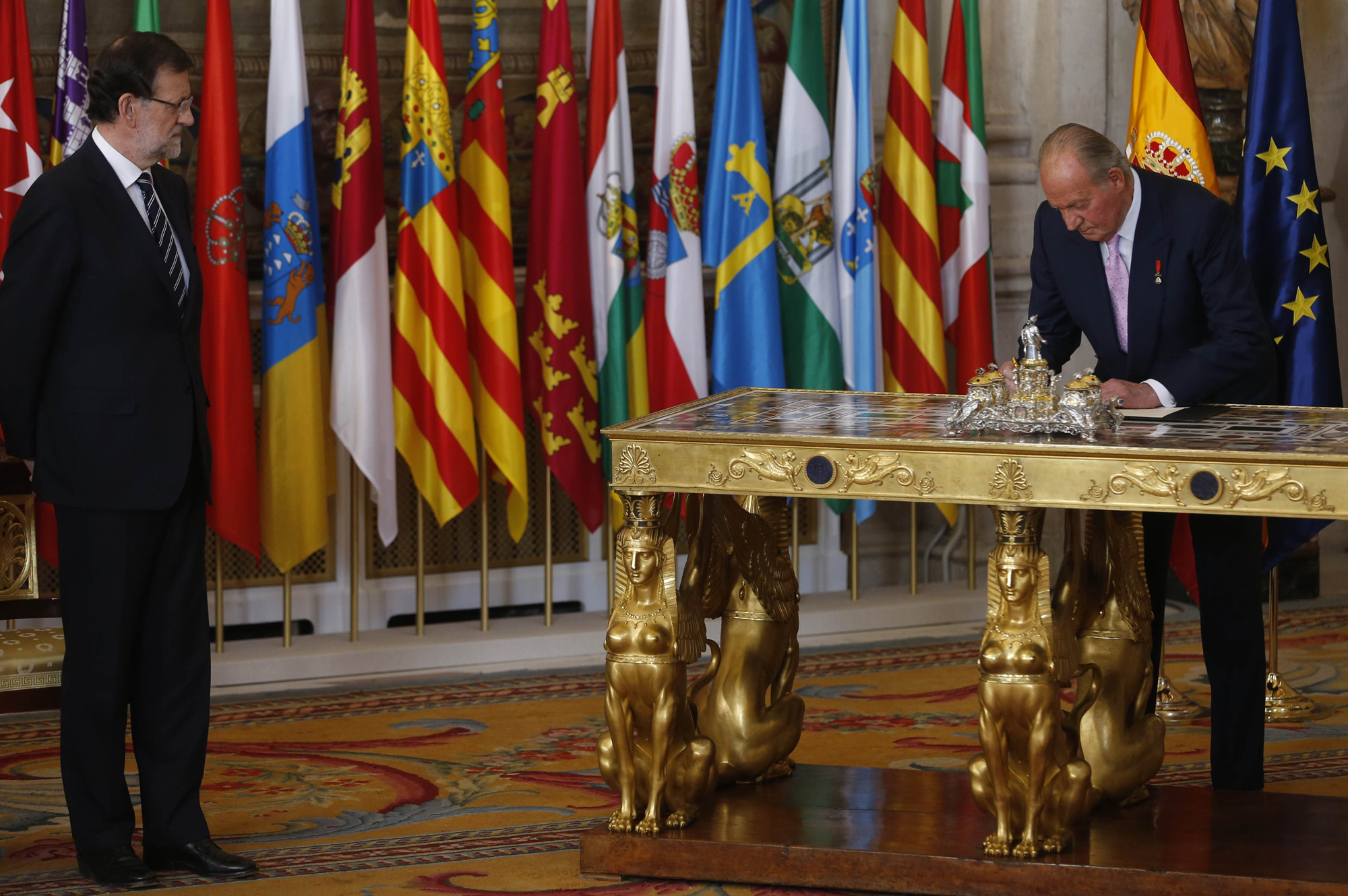
Juan Carlos I signing his abdication law. Next to him, prime minister Mariano Rajoy, countersigner of the law. (18 June 2014).

On the morning of 2 June 2014, Prime Minister Mariano Rajoy made a televised announcement that the King had told him of his intention to abdicate. Later, the King delivered a televised address and announced that he would abdicate the throne in favour of the Prince of Asturias. Royal officials described the King's choice as a personal decision which he had been contemplating since his 76th birthday at the start of the year. The King reportedly said, "No quiero que mi hijo se marchite esperando como Carlos." (English: "I do not want my son to wither waiting like Charles.")

As required by the Spanish constitution, any abdication would be settled by means of an organic law. A draft law was passed in parliament with 299 in favour, 19 against and 23 abstaining. On 18 June, he signed the organic law, which made the abdication effective when it was published in the Boletín Oficial del Estado at midnight. Felipe was enthroned the following morning, and Juan Carlos's granddaughter Leonor became the new Princess of Asturias. Juan Carlos was the fourth European monarch to abdicate in just over a year, following Pope Benedict XVI (28 February 2013), Queen Beatrix of the Netherlands (30 April 2013), and King Albert II of Belgium (21 July 2013).

The Spanish constitution at the time of the abdication did not grant an abdicated monarch the legal immunity of a head of state, but the government changed the law to allow this. However, unlike his previous immunity, the new legislation left him accountable to the supreme court, in a similar type of protection afforded to many high-ranking civil servants and politicians in Spain. The legislation stipulates that all outstanding legal matters relating to the former king be suspended and passed "immediately" to the supreme court.

==== Reactions ====
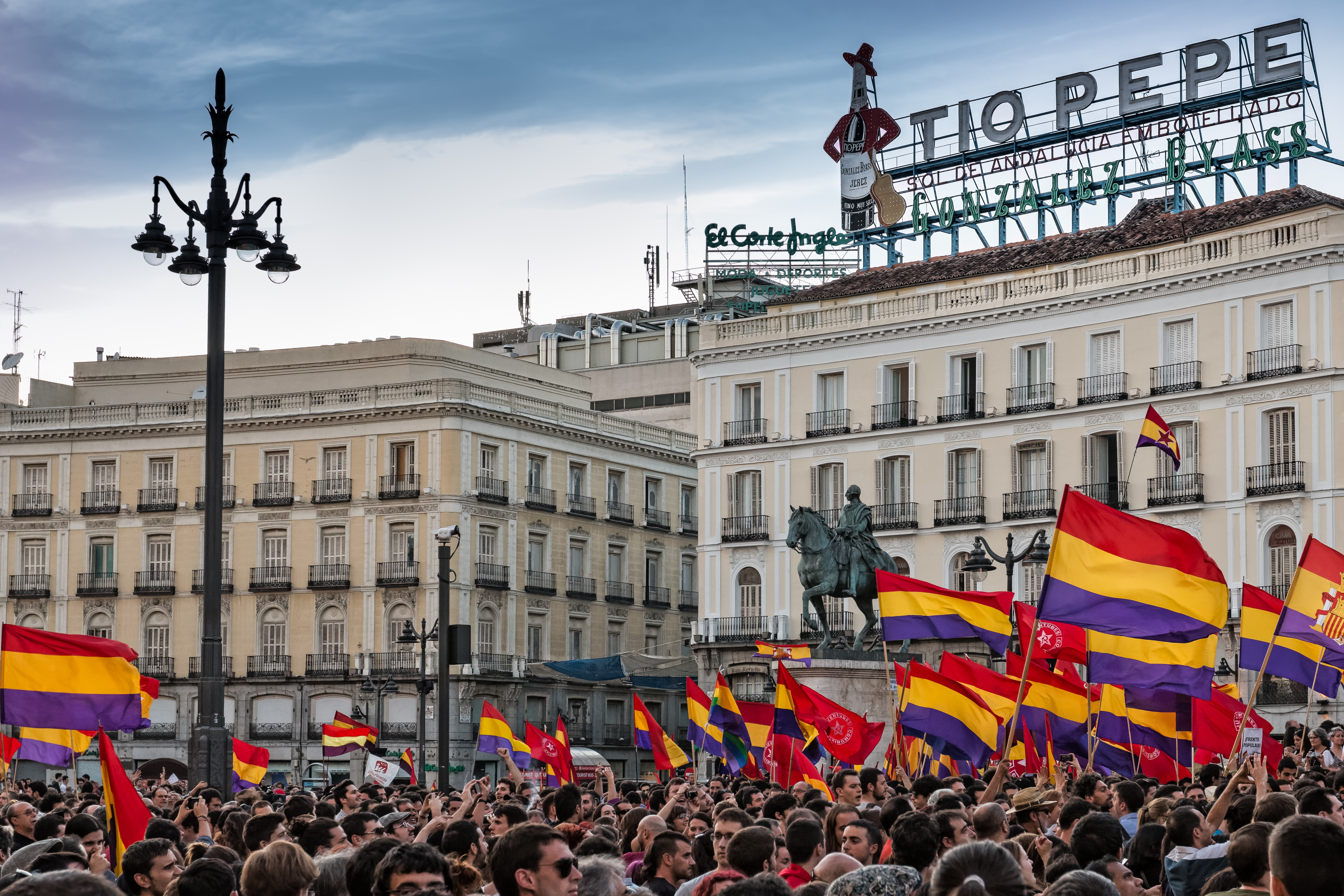
Republican demonstration in the Puerta del Sol on the day that Juan Carlos announced his decision to abdicate

The Spanish press gave the announcement a broadly positive reception, but described the moment as an "institutional crisis" and "a very important moment in the history of democratic Spain". Around Spain and in major cities (including London) the news was met by republican celebration and protests, calling for the end of the monarchy.

Catalan leader Artur Mas said that the news of the King's abdication would not slow down the process of independence for Catalonia. Iñigo Urkullu, the President of the Basque government, concluded that the King's reign was "full of light yet also darkness" and said that his successor Felipe should remember that "the Basque Question has not been resolved". Other regional leaders had more positive evaluations of Juan Carlos following his decision to abdicate: Alberto Núñez Feijóo of Galicia called him "the King of Democracy" who "guaranteed the continuation of constitutional monarchy" and Alberto Fabra of the Valencian Community said that Spaniards are proud of their king who had been "at the forefront of protecting our interests inside and outside of our borders".

British Prime Minister David Cameron stated: "I would like to use this opportunity to make a tribute to King Juan Carlos, who has done so much during his reign to aid the successful Spanish transition to democracy, and has been a great friend of the United Kingdom." The President of the European Commission, José Manuel Barroso, said that Juan Carlos was a "believer in Europeanism and modernity...without whom one could not understand modern Spain".

The Spanish public also gave a broadly positive opinion not only of the abdication but of his reign as a whole. According to a poll taken by El Mundo, 65% saw the King's reign as either good or very good, up from 41.3%. Overall, 55.7% of those polled in the 3–5 June survey by Sigma Dos supported the institution of the monarchy in Spain, up from 49.9% when the same question was posed six months prior. 57.5% believed the Prince could restore the royal family's lost prestige. An overwhelming majority of Spaniards believed the new King, Felipe VI, would make a good monarch and more than three-quarters believed King Juan Carlos had been right to hand over the throne to his son.

== Post-abdication ==
After abdication, Juan Carlos continued to have a role as institutional representative of the Crown.

From June 2014 to June 2019, he attended several Latin American presidential inaugurations such as the second inauguration of Juan Manuel Santos as president of Colombia, the inauguration of Tabaré Vázquez as president of Uruguay, and the inauguration of Mauricio Macri as president of Argentina. He also represented the Crown in different cultural and sports events, funerals, and awards ceremonies. Finally, the former sovereign was also present in the events about the 40th anniversary of the Spanish Constitution of 1978.

On 27 May 2019, King Juan Carlos announced by a letter to his son Felipe his intention to retire from public life on 2 June 2019, five years after he announced his abdication.

=== Corruption investigations ===
==== 2020 Saudi rail deal ====
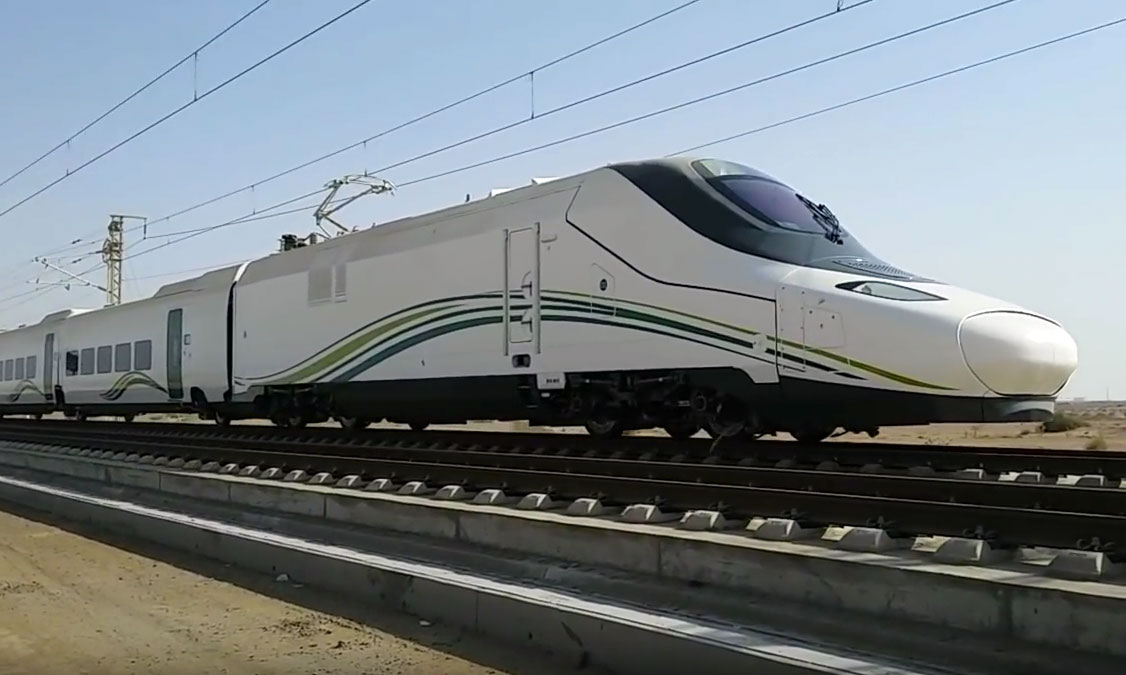
The construction of a high-speed railway in Saudi Arabia was allegedly coordinated with kick-backs to Juan Carlos during the late 2000s.

Recordings of the former King's alleged mistress Corinna zu Sayn-Wittgenstein-Sayn speaking with a former police chief were leaked to the press in mid-2018. Sayn-Wittgenstein claimed that Juan Carlos received kick-backs from commercial contracts in the Gulf States—particularly in the late-2000s construction of the €6.7 billion Haramain high-speed railway in Saudi Arabia—and maintained these proceeds in a bank account in Switzerland. She alleged that he purchased properties in Monaco under her name to circumvent the tax treatment of lawful residents, stating "[not] because he [loved] me a lot, but because I reside in Monaco." She further claimed the head of the Spanish intelligence service warned her that her life, and those of her children, would be at risk if she spoke of their association. The allegations drew demands for Juan Carlos to be investigated for corruption in early June 2019.

Swiss authorities began investigating Juan Carlos in March 2020 in relation to a $100 million gift to Sayn-Wittgenstein in 2012. This donation was linked to alleged kick-back fees from Saudi Arabia. Sayn-Wittgenstein reportedly told the head Swiss prosecutor on 19 December 2018 that Juan Carlos had given her €65 million out of "gratitude and love", to guarantee her future and her children's, because "he still had hopes to win her back". A letter written by Juan Carlos to his Swiss lawyers in 2018 stated the gift was irrevocable, despite his having asked in 2014 for the return of the money. On 14 March 2020, The Telegraph reported that his son Felipe, King of Spain since 2014, appeared as second beneficiary (after Juan Carlos) of the Lucum Foundation, which had received a €65 million donation by King Abdullah of Saudi Arabia. On 15 March 2020, the Royal Household declared that Felipe VI would renounce any inheritance from his father. Additionally, the Household announced that the former king would lose his public stipend from the State's General Budget.

In June 2020, the public prosecutor's office of the Supreme Court of Spain agreed to investigate Juan Carlos's role as facilitator in Phase II of the high speed rail connecting Mecca and Medina, intending to determine the criminal relevance of events that took place after his abdication in June 2014. As King of Spain, Juan Carlos was immune from prosecution from 1975 to 2014 by sovereign immunity.

A further investigation by Swiss authorities was undertaken regarding €3.5 million paid from the Lucum Foundation to the Bahamas-based bank Pictet & Ciein for a society called Dolphin, which was controlled by the lawyer Dante Canónica, who also controlled Lucum.

In December 2021, the Swiss prosecutors dropped all cases due to the impossibility of proving any illegality.

==== Credit cards and bank accounts ====
Spanish prosecutors opened an investigation into the use by Juan Carlos and other members of the royal family of credit cards used between 2016 and 2018 which were paid for by an overseas account to which neither Juan Carlos nor any member of the royal family were signatories, leading to accusations that the funds are undisclosed assets of Juan Carlos, and as the card drawings exceeded €120,000 in one year, comprised undisclosed income and was therefore a tax offence in Spain. Mexican millionaire and investment banker Allen Sanginés-Krause has been named as the owner of the cards, a friend of Juan Carlos to whom he donated sums of money using Air Force Colonel Nicolás Murga Mendoza as an intermediary.

In December 2020, Juan Carlos reportedly paid €678,393.72 to Spain's tax agency for the concept of defrauded money in an affair of "opaque credit cards" used between 2016 and 2018 by himself, his wife and some grandchildren, intending to avoid further scrutiny from the Supreme Court's prosecutor, the payment being an admission of fraud.

Swiss and Spanish prosecutors also investigated several accounts related to the former King, such as an account in Switzerland with almost €8 million and an attempt to withdraw nearly €10 million from Jersey, possibly from a trust set up by or for Juan Carlos in the 1990s. Juan Carlos claims he is "not responsible for any Jersey trust and never has been, either directly or indirectly".

In March 2022, Spanish prosecutors closed all cases against him following the same decision from Swiss prosecutors in December 2021.

==== Zagatka Foundation ====
Founded in Liechtenstein in 2003 and owned by Álvaro de Orleans-Borbón, a distant cousin of Juan Carlos who lives in Monaco, the foundation received a large sum of money from Switzerland; Juan Carlos is named as the third beneficiary. In 2009 Álvaro de Orleans-Borbón paid a cheque from Mexico for €4.3 million into the account which the Swiss adjudicated belonged to Juan Carlos. Juan Carlos appears to have drawn down funds from the Zagatka foundation to spend €8 million between 2009 and 2018 on private flights, with Air Partner receiving around €6.1 million. Zagatka used commissions due to Juan Carlos and paid to Zagatka to invest millions, mainly in Ibex35 companies between 2003 and 2018.

On 25 February 2021, Juan Carlos paid €4 million to the Spanish Tax Agency to avoid new tax offenses in relation with these flights.

==== Lucum foundation ====
A Panamanian Lucum foundation had Juan Carlos as the first beneficiary and King Felipe VI as a named second beneficiary, although Felipe has subsequently relinquished any inheritance from his father Juan Carlos. Lucum received $100 million from the Saudi royal house in 2008. Swiss prosecutors are concerned about who at the Swiss bank Mirabaud & Cie knows who the account was for and what was discovered about the source of the funds from the Ministry of Finance of Saudi Arabia. They are also concerned about a transfer of €3.5m from Lucum to an account held by Dante Canónica in the Bahamas. In 2012 the Mirabaud bank, which had concealed from its employees the beneficial owner of the account, asked for the account to be closed, due to possible adverse publicity; this was when the bulk of the funds were transferred to Corinna zu Sayn-Wittgenstein-Sayn.

=== Claims of harassment ===
In 2020, Sayn-Wittgenstein, resident in the United Kingdom, filed an harassment case in London against Juan Carlos, claiming he had pressured her to return the money given to her after their break up in 2012. In 2022, Juan Carlos won an appeal that he had immunity from those allegations relating to 2012–2014 when he was still King.

In 2023, the High Court of England and Wales threw out the case on the grounds that it had no jurisdiction in the matter, but made no judgement as to the substance of the allegations.

=== Relocation abroad ===
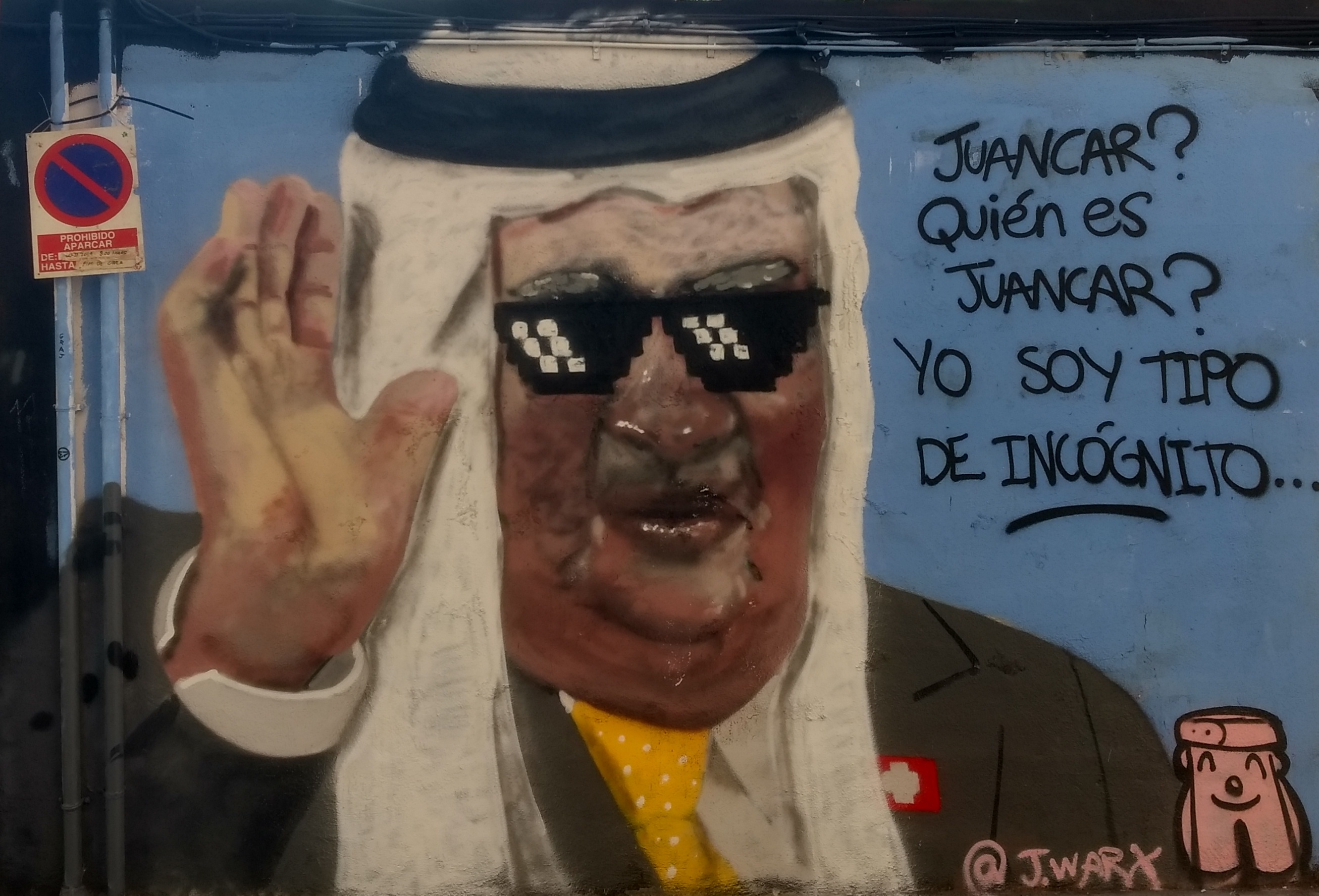
Satirical mural in Benimaclet, València, about Juan Carlos's relocation to Abu Dhabi. (The caption 'Juancar? Who is Juancar? My name is Guy Incognito', is a reference to an episode of The Simpsons.)

On 3 August 2020, the Royal Household announced Juan Carlos wished to relocate from Spain because of increased media press about his business dealings in Saudi Arabia, and he had left a letter to his son saying so. By the time the letter had been made public, he had already left the country. Journalists speculated that he might have fled to the Dominican Republic, Portugal, France, and Italy, and, later, as of 7 August, the Emirates Palace in Abu Dhabi. The Royal Household initially declined requests to publicly disclose Juan Carlos's location; on 17 August, the Royal Household confirmed that, since 3 August, Juan Carlos had been in the United Arab Emirates, where he arrived by taking a private plane from Vigo Airport.

Since then, he has visited Spain regularly, mainly the town of Sanxenxo, in the north of Spain, to do one of his favorite activities, sailing. He was also present at the private celebration that the Spanish royal family made at the Royal Palace of El Pardo to celebrate Leonor's 18th birthday.

In 2025, Juan Carlos published his memoir, titled Reconciliation. The book was criticized by culture minister Ernest Urtasun as "sickening" for passages in which Juan Carlos wrote of his "great respect" for Francisco Franco and other favorable descriptions of him.

== Health ==
A benign 17–19 mm tumour was removed under general anaesthetic from King Juan Carlos's right lung in an operation carried out in the Hospital Clínic de Barcelona in May 2010. The operation followed an annual check-up, and Juan Carlos was not expected to need any further treatment. He was treated in Clinica Planas.

In April 2012, the King underwent surgery for a triple fracture of the hip at the San Jose Hospital, Madrid, following a fall on a private elephant-hunting trip to Botswana. He also underwent a hip operation in September 2013 at Madrid's Quirón hospital. In April 2018, Juan Carlos was admitted to hospital for a surgery on his right knee.

On 24 August 2019, he had cardiac surgery.

== In popular culture ==
Juan Carlos I is portrayed on screen by Fernando Cayo in the Antena 3 mini-series 20-N: los últimos días de Franco (2008); by Lluís Homar in the Televisión Española mini-series 23-F: El día más difícil del Rey (2009); by Fernando Cayo in the Antena 3 mini-series Adolfo Suárez, el presidente (2010); by Fernando Gil in the Telecinco mini-series Alfonso, el príncipe maldito (2010); by Juanjo Puigcorbé in the Telecinco mini-series Felipe y Letizia (2010); by Jorge Suquet in the Antena 3 mini-series Sofía (2011); by Fernando Cayo in the film 17 Hours (2011); by Álex Tormo in the Televisión Española mini-series Tarancón, el quinto mandamiento (2011); by Enrique Aragonés, Patrick Criado, and Fernando Gil in the Telecinco mini-series El Rey (2014); by Fernando Andina in the Televisión Española telefilm De la ley a la ley (2017); by Cristóbal Suárez in the Atresmedia mini-series Untameable (2023); and by Miki Esparbé in the Movistar Plus+ mini-series The Anatomy of a Moment (2025).

== Titles, styles, honours and arms ==
Royal monogram

In 1969, Juan Carlos was named as General Franco's successor and was given the title of 'Prince of Spain'. Upon the death of Franco in 1975, Juan Carlos acceded to the throne of Spain. The current Spanish constitution refers to the monarch by the simple title "King of Spain". Aside from this title, the constitution allows for the use of other historic titles pertaining to the Spanish monarchy, without specifying them. This was also reiterated by a decree promulgated on 6 November 1987 concerning titles of members of the royal family. Since his abdication in 2014, King Juan Carlos has retained, by courtesy, the title of king and style of "majesty" that he enjoyed during his reign. Likewise, he maintains his military rank in reserve.

=== Arms ===
Coat of arms of Juan Carlos I
Notes The blazoning of the coat of arms of the King of Spain is set out in Title II, Rule 1, of Spanish Royal Decree 1511 of 21 January 1977, by which the Rules for Flags, Standards, Guidons, Banners, and Badges were adopted. Adopted 21 January 1977 (de facto 22 November 1975) Crest Spanish Royal Crown Escutcheon Quarterly: Castile and León, Aragon, and Navarre; enté en point: Granada; inescutcheon: Bourbon (Anjou Branch) Supporters Cross of Burgundy Orders Order of the Golden Fleece Other elements Base point, the yoke with ribbons and the sheaf of five arrows. Banner King Juan Carlos's personal Royal Standard is a dark blue square with his coat of arms. Symbolism The first quarter represents Castile, the second León, the third Aragon and the fourth Navarre; enté en point the arms of Granada and on the escutcheon of pretence the ancestral arms of Bourbon-Anjou are represented. Previous versions Coat of arms as Prince of Spain (1971–1975) The coat of arms used as Prince of Spain which was virtually identical to the one later adopted when he became King, differed only that it featured the crown of heir to the throne, decorated with only four half-arches."

== Bibliography ==
- Juan Carlos I (2025). Reconciliación: Memorias [Reconciliation: A Memoir]. Editorial Planeta. ISBN 978-8408296225.

== See also ==
- List of honours of the Spanish royal family by country
- Succession to the Spanish throne

== Notes ==
Juan Carlos I House of Bourbon Cadet branch of the Capetian dynasty Born: 5 January 1938
Regnal titles
Vacant Title last held by Alfonso XIII	King of Spain¹; 1975–2014	Succeeded by Felipe VI
Preceded by Alejandro Rodríguez de Valcárcel as President of the Regency Council	King of Spain¹; 1975–2014	Succeeded by Felipe VI
Notes and references
1. He also adopted the title Head of State from 1975 until the new constitution in 1978, which confirmed his position of King.
