= 1904 =

1904 in various calendars
- Gregorian calendar: 1904; MCMIV
- Ab urbe condita: 2657
- Armenian calendar: 1353; ԹՎ ՌՅԾԳ
- Assyrian calendar: 6654
- Baháʼí calendar: 60–61
- Balinese saka calendar: 1825–1826
- Bengali calendar: 1310–1311
- Berber calendar: 2854
- British Regnal year: 3 Edw. 7 – 4 Edw. 7
- Buddhist calendar: 2448
- Burmese calendar: 1266
- Byzantine calendar: 7412–7413
- Chinese calendar: 癸卯年 (Water Rabbit); 4601 or 4394 — to — 甲辰年 (Wood Dragon); 4602 or 4395
- Coptic calendar: 1620–1621
- Discordian calendar: 3070
- Ethiopian calendar: 1896–1897
- Hebrew calendar: 5664–5665
- Hindu calendars
- Vikram Samvat: 1960–1961
- Shaka Samvat: 1825–1826
- Kali Yuga: 5004–5005
- Holocene calendar: 11904
- Igbo calendar: 904–905
- Iranian calendar: 1282–1283
- Islamic calendar: 1321–1322
- Japanese calendar: Meiji 37 (明治３７年)
- Javanese calendar: 1833–1834
- Julian calendar: Gregorian minus 13 days
- Korean calendar: 4237
- Minguo calendar: 8 before ROC 民前8年
- Nanakshahi calendar: 436
- Thai solar calendar: 2446–2447
- Tibetan calendar: ཆུ་མོ་ཡོས་ལོ་ (female Water-Hare); 2030 or 1649 or 877 — to — ཤིང་ཕོ་འབྲུག་ལོ་ (male Wood-Dragon); 2031 or 1650 or 878

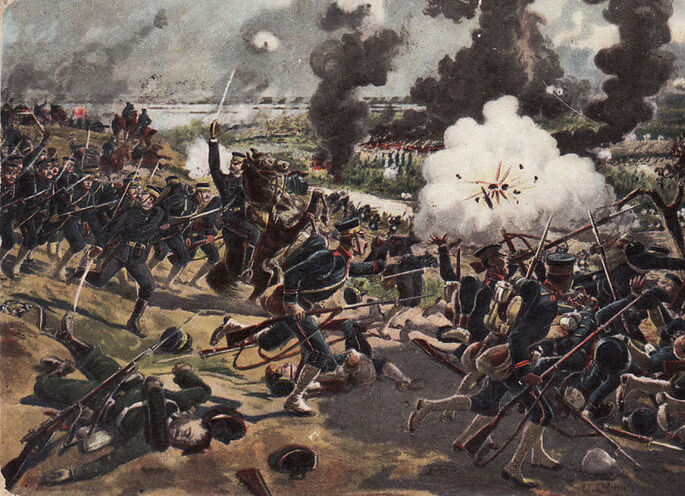
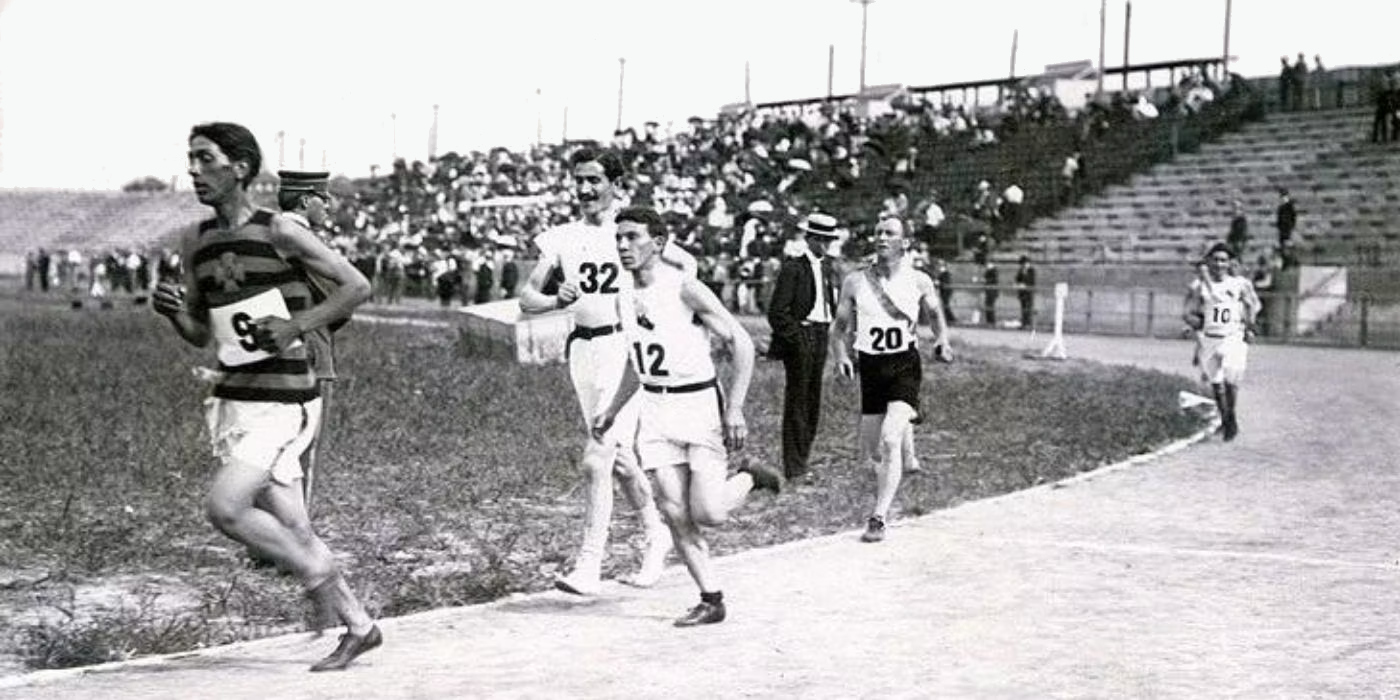
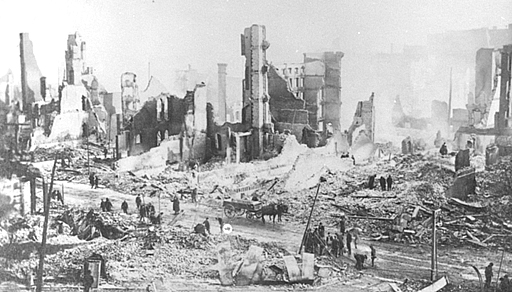
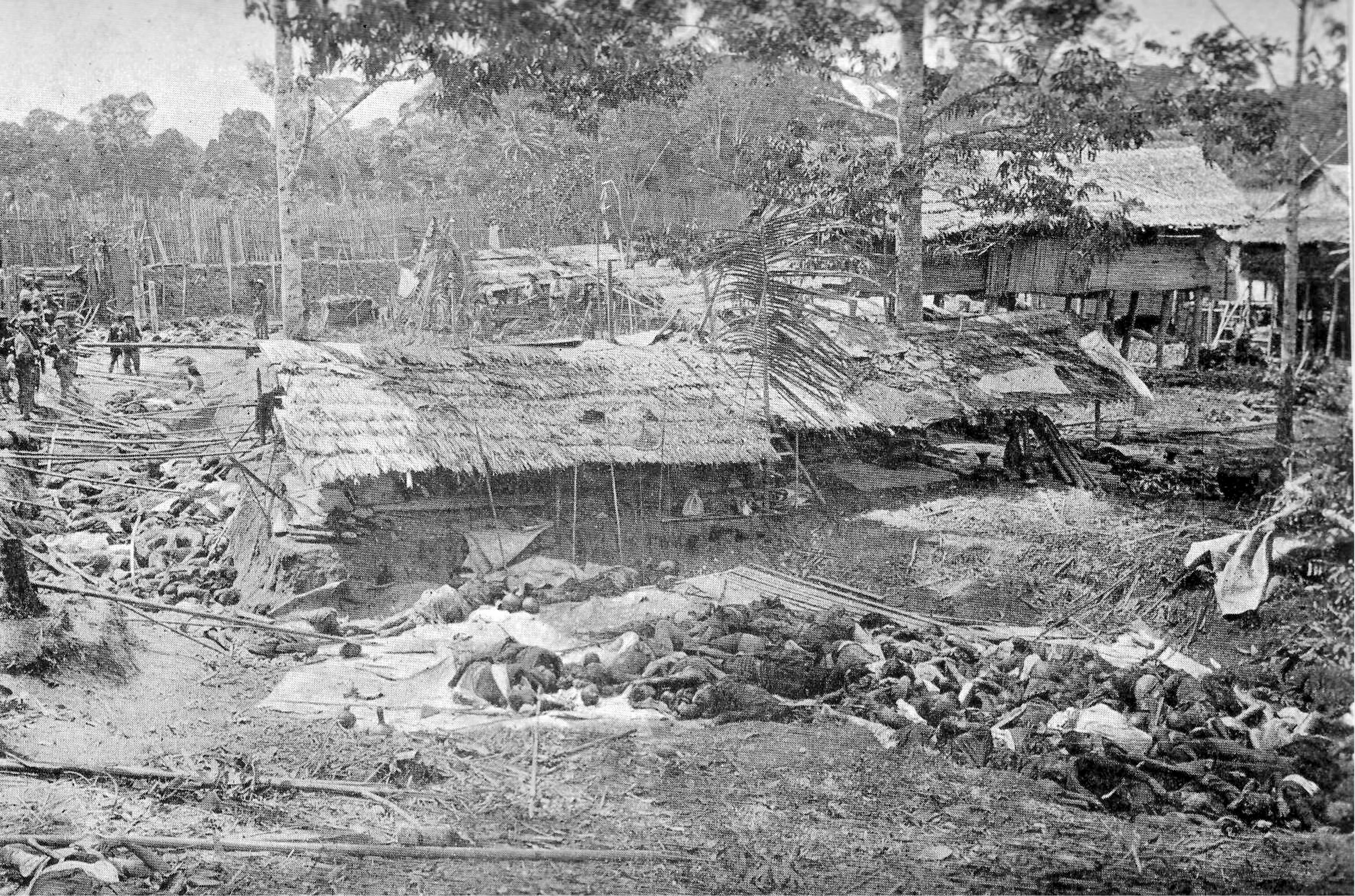
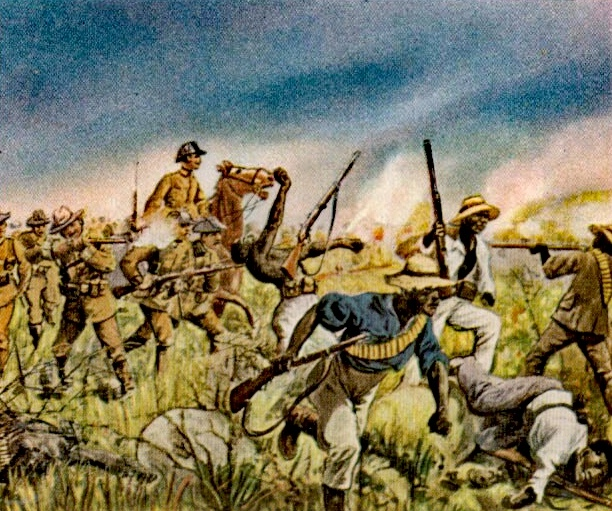
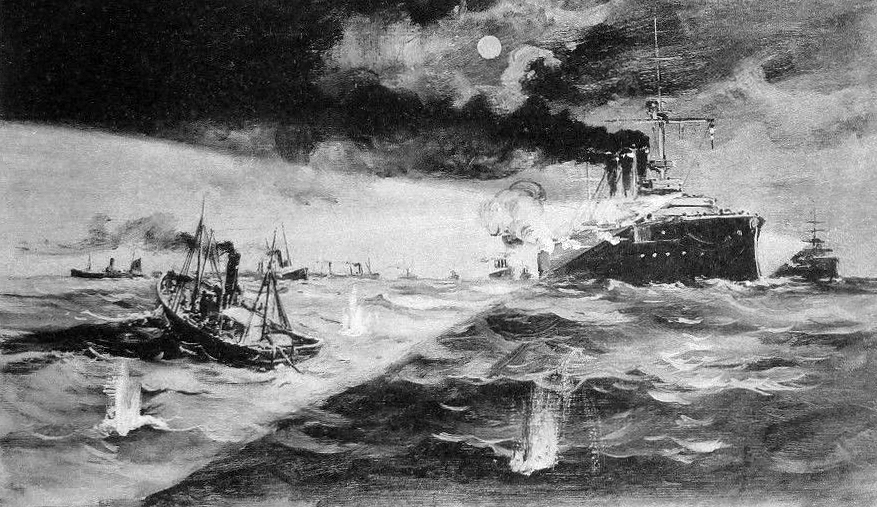
From top to bottom, left to right:
- The Russo-Japanese War begins as Japan’s surprise attack on Port Arthur signals its rise as a global power;
- The 1904 Summer Olympics in St. Louis become the first Games held in the United States;
- The Great Baltimore Fire devastates the city’s core, destroying over 1,500 buildings and prompting new firefighting standards;
- The Kuta Reh massacre in Aceh sees hundreds of villagers killed by Dutch colonial forces during the Aceh War;
- The Herero Wars in German South West Africa escalate into genocide against the Herero and Nama peoples;
- The Dogger Bank incident sees Russian warships mistakenly fire on British fishermen, nearly triggering war.

1904 (MCMIV) was a leap year starting on Friday of the Gregorian calendar and a leap year starting on Thursday of the Julian calendar, the 1904th year of the Common Era (CE) and Anno Domini (AD) designations, the 904th year of the 2nd millennium, the 4th year of the 20th century, and the 5th year of the 1900s decade. As of the start of 1904, the Gregorian calendar was 13 days ahead of the Julian calendar, which remained in localized use until 1923.

== Events ==
=== January ===
- January 7 – The distress signal CQD is established, only to be replaced 2 years later by SOS.
- January 12 – The Herero Wars in German South West Africa begin.
- January 17 – Anton Chekhov's last play, The Cherry Orchard, opens at the Moscow Art Theatre directed by Constantin Stanislavski.
- January 23 – The Ålesund fire destroys most buildings in the town of Ålesund, Norway, leaving about 10,000 people without shelter.
- January 25 – Halford Mackinder presents a paper on "The Geographical Pivot of History" to the Royal Geographical Society of London in which he formulates the Heartland Theory, originating the study of geopolitics.

=== February ===
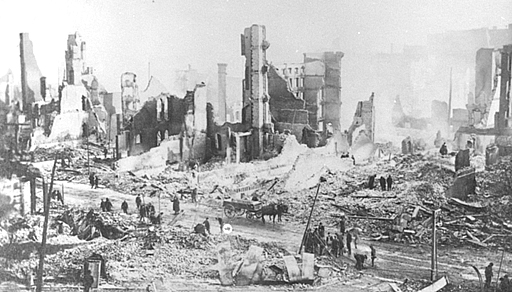
February 7: Aftermath of the Great Baltimore Fire.

- February 7 – The Great Baltimore Fire in Baltimore, Maryland, destroys over 1,500 buildings in 31 hours.

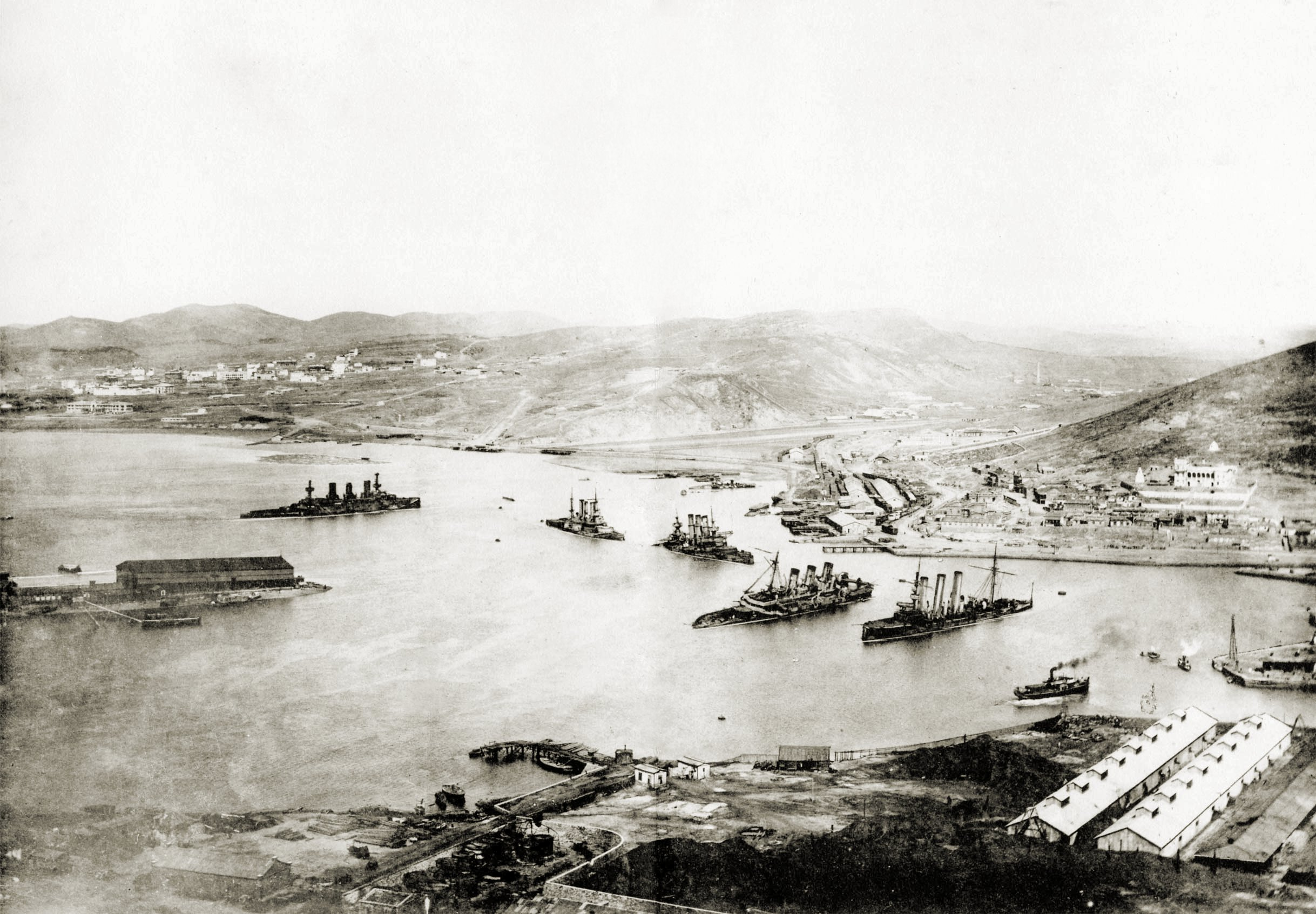
Port Arthur from Gold Hill

- February 8–9 – Battle of Port Arthur: A surprise Japanese naval attack on Port Arthur (Lüshun) in Manchuria starts the Russo-Japanese War.
- February 10 – Roger Casement publishes his account of Belgian atrocities in the Congo.
- February 17 – Puccini's opera Madama Butterfly debuts at La Scala in Milan, to no great acclaim. On May 28 a revised version opens in Brescia, to huge success.
- February 23 – For $10 million, the United States gains control of the Panama Canal Zone.
- February 28 – S.L. Benfica, one of the biggest Association Football clubs in Portugal, is founded as Sport Lisboa.

=== March ===
- March 3 – Kaiser Wilhelm II of Germany becomes the first person to make a recording of a political document, using Thomas Edison's cylinder.
- March 6 – Scottish National Antarctic Expedition: Led by William Speirs Bruce, the Antarctic region of Coats Land is discovered from the Scotia.
- March 31 – British expedition to Tibet: The Battle of Guru – British troops under Colonel Francis Younghusband defeat ill-equipped Tibetan troops.

=== April ===
- April 4 – 1904 Kresna earthquakes: two earthquakes strike near Kresna, Bulgaria, killing at least 200 people.
- April 6 – Joseph F. Smith announces the Second Manifesto in General Conference of the Church of Jesus Christ of Latter-day Saints in Utah Territory, prohibiting the practice of polygamy, which has continued to be sanctioned by some of its leaders in violation of the 1890 Manifesto officially banning the practice.
- April 8
  - The Entente Cordiale is signed between the UK and France.
  - Longacre Square in Midtown Manhattan is renamed Times Square, after The New York Times.
- April 8–10 – Aleister Crowley writes The Book of the Law, a text central to Thelema, in Cairo.
- April 19 – The Great Fire of Toronto destroys much of the city's downtown, but there are no fatalities.
- April 27 – The Australian Labor Party becomes the first such party to gain national government, under Chris Watson.
- April 30 – The Louisiana Purchase Exposition World's Fair opens in St. Louis, Missouri (closes December 1).

=== May ===
- May 4
  - United States Army engineers begin work on the Panama Canal.
  - Charles Rolls and Henry Royce meet for the first time, in Manchester England to agree production of Rolls-Royce motor cars; the first produced under their joint names are launched in December.
  - German Association football club FC Schalke 04 is established.
- May 5
  - British expedition to Tibet: Hundreds of Tibetans attack the British camp at Changlo, and hold the advantage for a while, before being defeated by superior weapons, and losing at least 200 men.
  - Pitching against the Philadelphia Athletics, Cy Young of the Boston Americans throws the first perfect game in the modern era of baseball.
- May 9 – Great Western Railway of England 3700 Class 3440 City of Truro possibly becomes the first railway locomotive to exceed 100 miles per hour (160 km/h).
- May 15 – Russo-Japanese War: Russian minelayer Amur lays a minefield about 15 miles (24 km) off Port Arthur, and sinks Japan's battleships Hatsuse, 15,000 tons with 496 crew, and Yashima. On the same day, the Japanese protected cruiser Yoshino sinks after being accidentally rammed by the armored cruiser Kasuga, killing over 270 crew, including Captain Sayegi and his second-in-command, Commander Hirowateri. Japan will keep the loss of Yashima secret for over a year.
- May 21 – The International Federation of Association Football, FIFA, is established.
- May 30 – Alpha Gamma Delta, which becomes an international sorority, is founded by 11 women at Syracuse University.

=== June ===
- June 3 – The International Alliance of Women is founded.
- June 15 – A fire aboard the steamboat General Slocum in New York City's East River kills 1,021.
- June 16
  - Finnish nationalist Eugen Schauman assassinates Nikolay Bobrikov, the Russian Governor-General of Finland, in Helsinki.
  - The original "Bloomsday", the day James Joyce first walks out with his future wife Nora Barnacle (whom he first met on June 10), to the Dublin suburb of Ringsend. He sets the action of his novel Ulysses (1922) on this date.
- June 28
  - Danish ocean liner SS Norge runs aground and sinks close to Rockall, killing approximately 627 people, many of whom are Russian-Polish and Scandinavian emigrants.
  - The original icon of Our Lady of Kazan is stolen and subsequently destroyed in Russia.
  - English Association football club Hull City A.F.C. is established.
- June 29 – The 1904 Moscow tornado occurs.

=== July ===
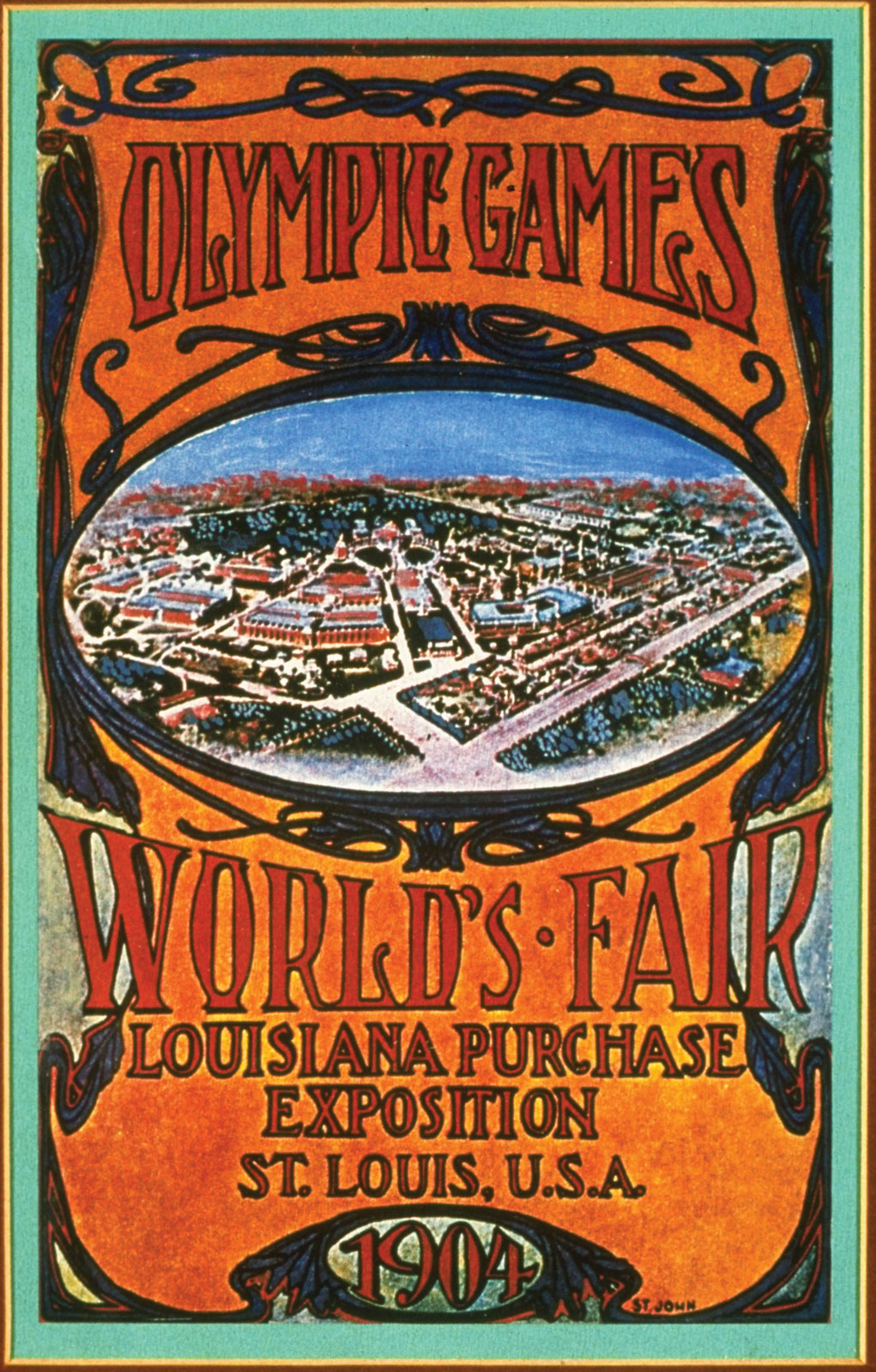
1904 Summer Olympics

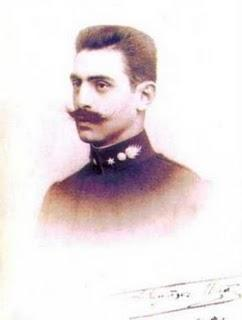
Pavlos Melas

- July – Pavlos Melas enters Macedonia with a small unit of men during the Macedonian Struggle.
- July 1 – The third Modern Olympic Games open in St. Louis, Missouri, United States, as part of the World's Fair.
- July 22 – The first 2,000 of 62,000 contracted Chinese coolies arrive at Durban in South Africa from Qinhuangdao to relieve the shortage of unskilled labourers in the Transvaal Colony gold mines, recruited and shipped by the Chinese Engineering and Mining Corporation (CEMC), of which Herbert Hoover is a director.
- July 23 – A continuous track tractor is patented by David Roberts of Richard Hornsby & Sons of Grantham in England.

=== August ===
- August 3 – British expedition to Tibet: The British expedition under Colonel Francis Younghusband takes Lhasa, Tibet.
- August 11 – Battle of Waterberg: Lothar von Trotha defeats the Herero people in German South West Africa, and drives them into the Omaheke desert, starting the Herero and Namaqua genocide.
- August 14 – Ismael Montes becomes President of Bolivia.
- August 17 – Russo-Japanese War: A Japanese infantry charge fails to take Port Arthur.
- August 24 – Faroese Association football club Klaksvíkar Ítróttarfelag is established.
- Summer – Henri Matisse paints Luxe, Calme et Volupté at Saint-Tropez; it will be considered the starting point of Fauvism.

=== September ===
- September – Stuyvesant High School opens in New York City as Manhattan's first manual trade school for boys.
- September 1 – Griffin Park football ground, home of Brentford F.C., opens in London.
- September 2 – John Voss sails the rigged dugout canoe Tilikum into the River Thames in England after a 3-year voyage from Victoria, British Columbia, westabout.
- September 7 – British expedition to Tibet: The Dalai Lama signs the Anglo-Tibetan Treaty with Colonel Francis Younghusband.
- September 17 – An early study on the relationship between alcohol and cardiovascular disease is published in the United States.
- September 26 – New Zealand dolphin Pelorus Jack is individually protected by Order in Council under the Sea Fisheries Act.

=== October ===
- October – The Daytona Educational and Industrial Training School for Negro Girls, predecessor of Bethune–Cookman University, is opened in Florida by Mary McLeod Bethune.
- October 1 – Phi Delta Epsilon, the international medical fraternity, is founded by Aaron Brown and 8 of his friends, at Cornell University Medical College.
- October 4 – Swedish Association football club IFK Göteborg is founded, becoming the 39th IFK-association.
- October 5 – Alpha Kappa Psi, a co-ed professional business fraternity, is founded on the campus of New York University.
- October 9 – German journalist Anna Rüling, in a speech to the Scientific-Humanitarian Committee in Berlin, makes the first known public statement of the socio-legal problems faced by lesbians.
- October 11 – Loftus Road football stadium opens in London.
- October 13 – Pavlos Melas is encircled at Statista and killed during the Macedonian Struggle.
- October 15 – Theta Tau, a professional engineering fraternity, is founded at the University of Minnesota in Minneapolis.
- October 18 – In Germany:
  - The Kaiser-Friedrich-Museum opens in Berlin for the display of fine art.
  - Gustav Mahler's Symphony No. 5 is premiered by the Gürzenich Orchestra Cologne.
- October 19 – Polytechnic University of the Philippines is founded as Manila Business School, through the superintendence of American C. A. O'Reilley.
- October 21 – Russo-Japanese War: Dogger Bank incident – The Russian Baltic Fleet fires on British trawlers it mistakes for Japanese torpedo boats, in the North Sea.
- October 27 – The first underground line of the New York City Subway opens.
- October 28 – Panama and Uruguay establish diplomatic relations.
- Late October – The first members of what will become the Bloomsbury Group move to the Bloomsbury district of London; they will be joined about November 8 by the future novelist Virginia Woolf.

=== November ===
- November 8 – 1904 United States presidential election: Republican incumbent Theodore Roosevelt defeats Democrat Alton B. Parker.
- November 16
  - The settlement at Grytviken, on the British South Atlantic island territory of South Georgia, is established by Norwegian sea captain Carl Anton Larsen, as a whaling station for his Compañía Argentina de Pesca.
  - English engineer John Ambrose Fleming patents the first thermionic vacuum tube, the two-electrode diode ("oscillation valve" or Fleming valve).
- November 24 – A continuous track tractor is successfully demonstrated by the Holt Manufacturing Company in the United States. The "caterpillar track" will come to revolutionize construction vehicles and land warfare.

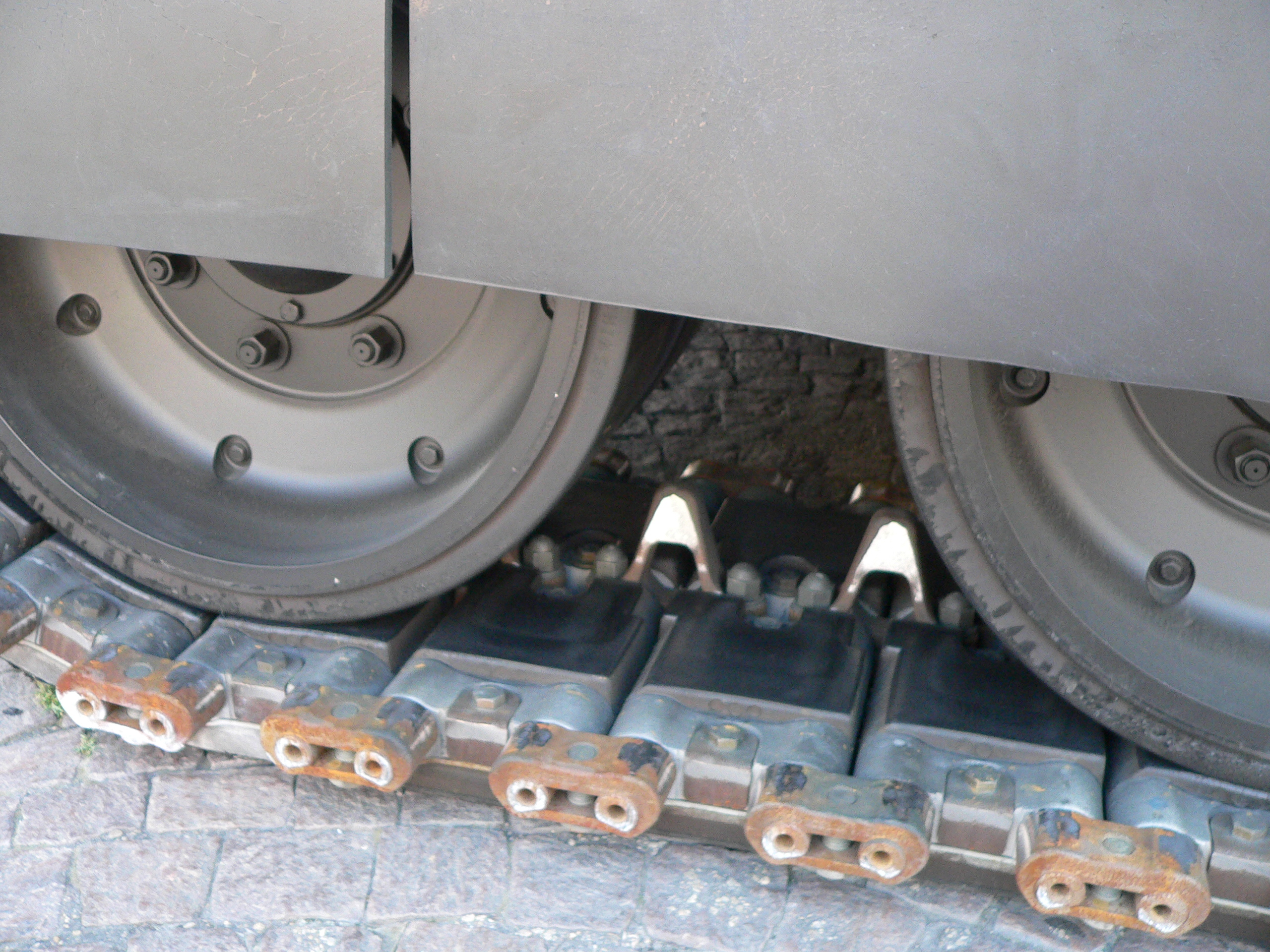
July 23 & November 24: continuous track

=== December ===
- December 2 – The St. Petersburg Soviet urges a run on the banks; the attempt fails, and the executive committee is arrested.
- December 3 – Charles Dillon Perrine discovers Jupiter's largest irregular satellite, later called Himalia, at California's Lick Observatory.
- December 6 – Theodore Roosevelt announces his "Corollary" to the Monroe Doctrine, stating that the United States will intervene in the Western Hemisphere should Latin American governments prove incapable or unstable.
- December 10 – The Pi Kappa Phi fraternity is founded at the College of Charleston in Charleston, South Carolina.
- December 27
  - The stage play Peter Pan, or The Boy Who Wouldn't Grow Up premieres in London.
  - The Abbey Theatre in Dublin opens.
- December 31 – In New York City, the first New Year's Eve celebration is held in Times Square.

=== Date unknown ===
- Global cosmetics companies are founded in Paris (France): Coty, by François Coty, and Garnier, by Alfred Amour Garnier.

== Births ==
=== January ===
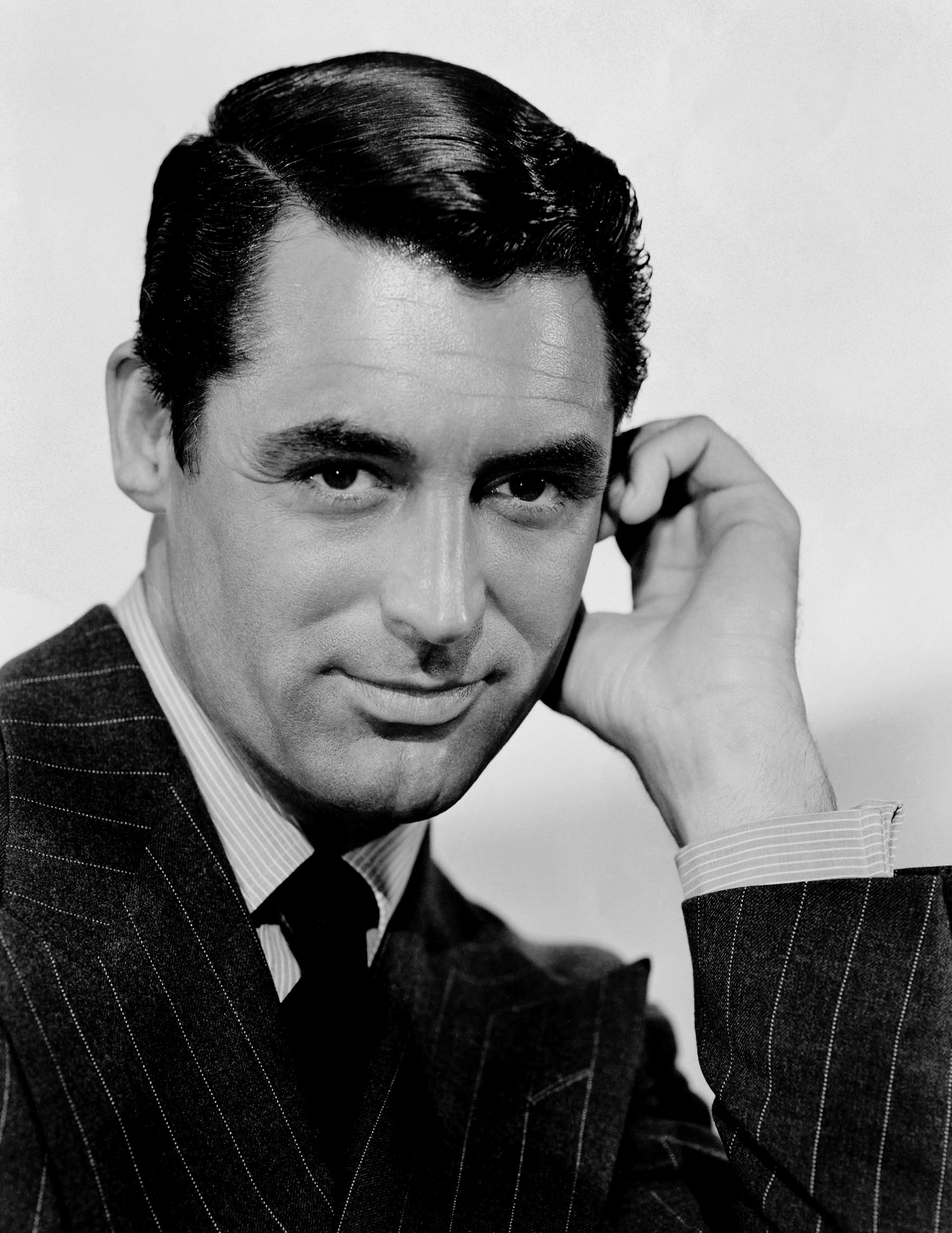
Cary Grant

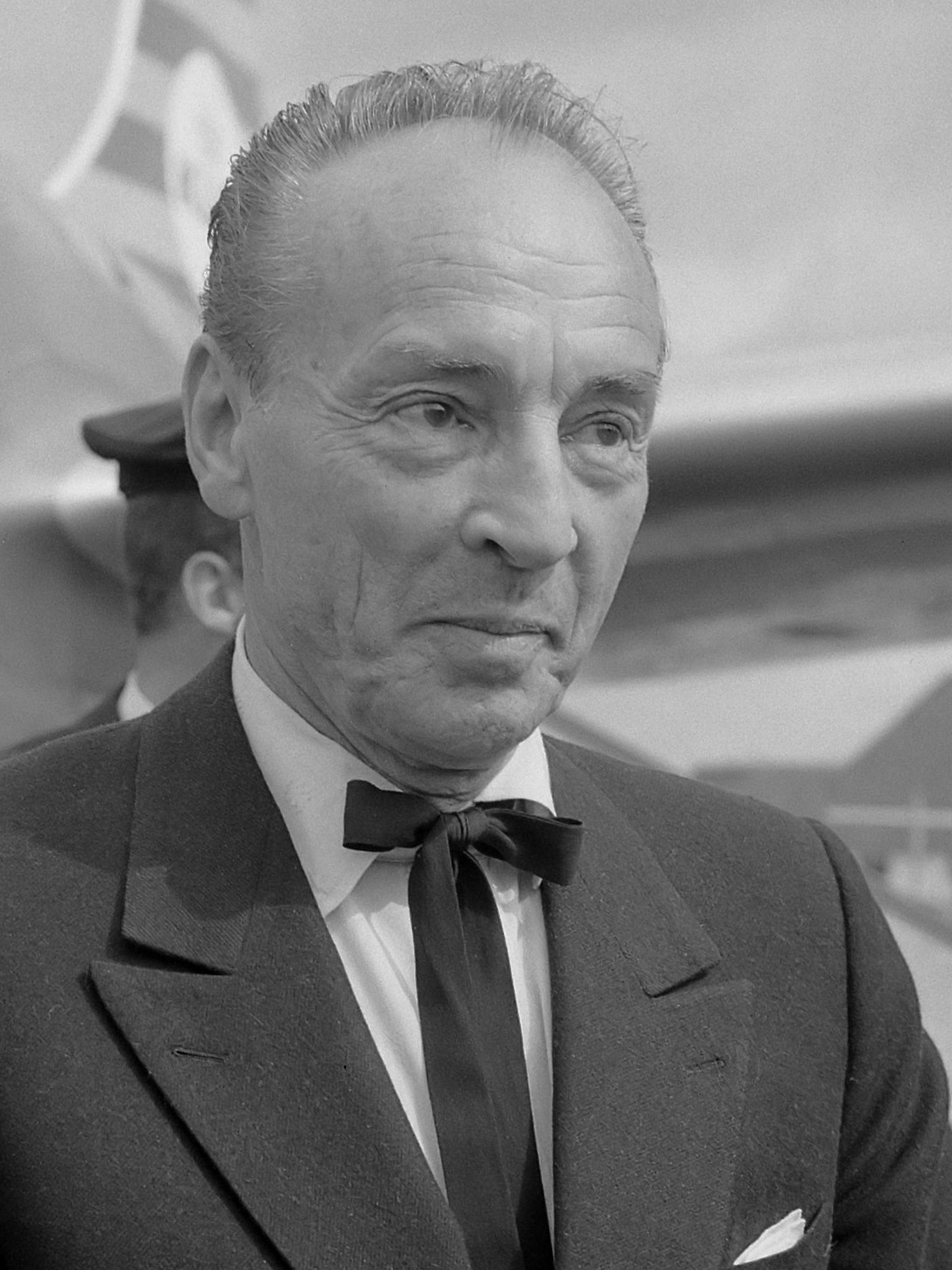
George Balanchine

- January 1 – Fazal Ilahi Chaudhry, Pakistani politician, 5th president of Pakistan (died 1982)
- January 5 – Jeane Dixon, American astrologer (died 1997)
- January 10 – Ray Bolger, American actor, singer and dancer (The Wizard of Oz) (died 1987)
- January 14 – Cecil Beaton, English photographer (died 1980)
- January 18 – Cary Grant, English actor (died 1986)
- January 21 – Edris Rice-Wray Carson, American medical researcher (died 1990)
- January 22
  - George Balanchine, Russian-born American choreographer (died 1983)
  - Arkady Gaidar, Russian children's writer (died 1941)
- January 26
  - Ancel Keys, American scientist (died 2004)
  - Donald Macintyre, British naval officer and naval historian (died 1981)
  - Seán MacBride, Irish statesman, recipient of the Nobel Peace Prize (died 1988)
- January 27 – James J. Gibson, American psychologist (died 1979)
- January 29 – Arnold Gehlen, German philosopher (died 1976)

=== February ===
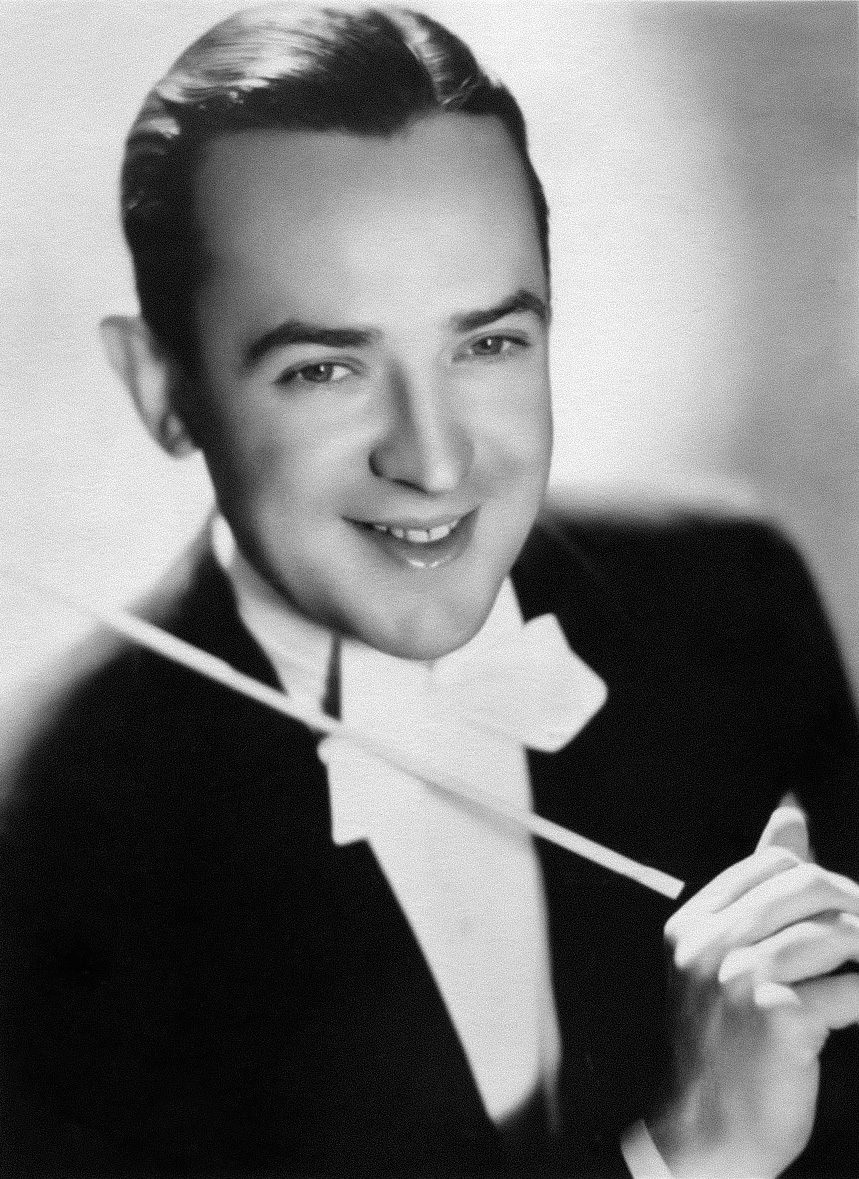
Jimmy Dorsey

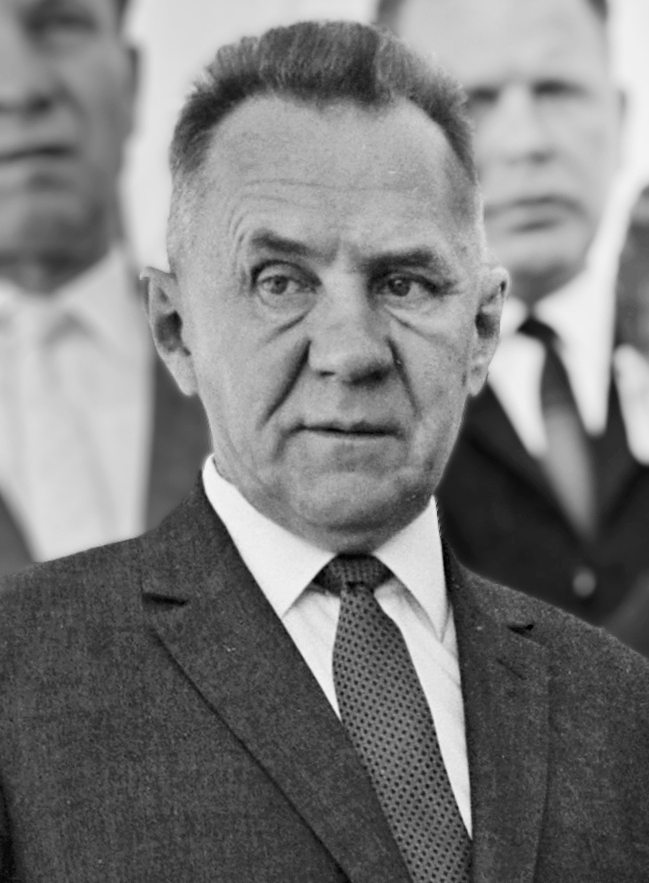
Alexei Kosygin

- February 1
  - Ángel Borlenghi, Argentine labor leader, politician (died 1962)
  - S. J. Perelman, American humorist, author (died 1979)
- February 2 – Valery Chkalov, Soviet test pilot (died 1938)
- February 3
  - Luigi Dallapiccola, Italian composer (died 1975)
  - Pretty Boy Floyd, American gangster (died 1934)
- February 4 – MacKinlay Kantor, American writer, historian (died 1977)
- February 10
  - Emil Bodnăraș, Romanian communist politician and army officer and Soviet agent (died 1976)
  - John Farrow, Australian film director (died 1963)
- February 11
  - Sir Keith Holyoake, 26th Prime Minister of New Zealand (died 1983)
  - Lucile Randon, French supercentenarian, last surviving person born in 1904 (died 2023)
- February 16 – George F. Kennan, American diplomat (died 2005)
- February 21 – Alexei Kosygin, Premier of the Soviet Union (died 1980)
- February 23
  - Gaston Marie Jacquier, French Roman Catholic bishop in Algeria (died 1976)
  - William L. Shirer, American journalist, author (died 1993)
- February 29 – Jimmy Dorsey, American bandleader (died 1957)

=== March ===
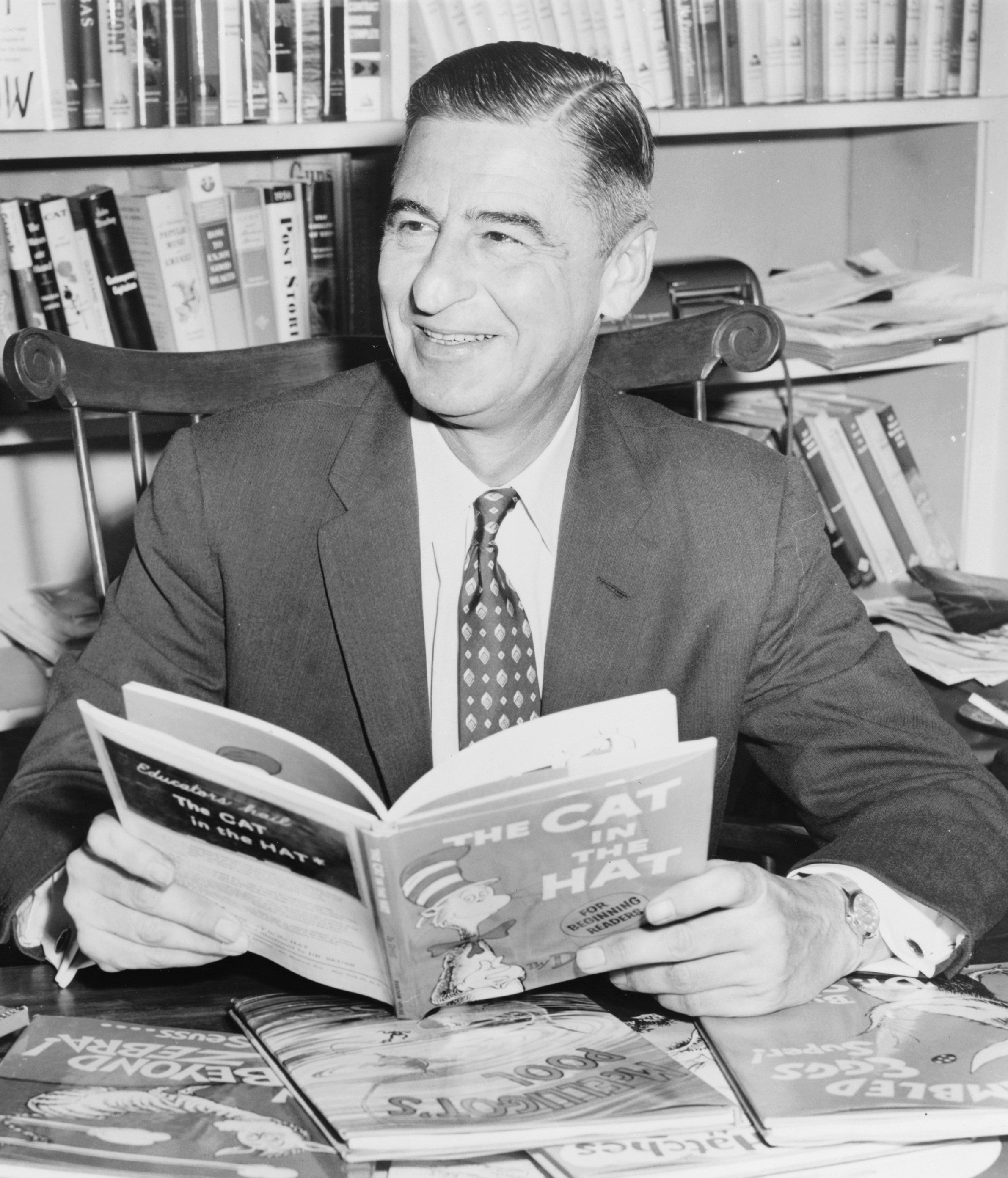
Dr. Seuss

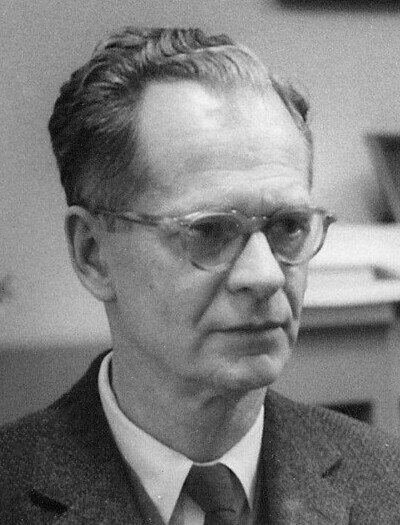
B.F. Skinner

- March 1 – Glenn Miller, American bandleader (died 1944)
- March 2 – Dr. Seuss, American children's author (The Cat in the Hat) (died 1991)
- March 4
  - Luis Carrero Blanco, 69th prime minister of Spain (died 1973)
  - George Gamow, Ukrainian-born American physicist (died 1968)
  - Joseph Schmidt, Austrian-Hungarian tenor, actor (died 1942)
- March 5 – Mao Bangchu, Republic of China air force general (died 1987)
- March 7 – Reinhard Heydrich, German Nazi official (died 1942)
- March 14 – Doris Eaton Travis, American actress (died 2010)
- March 15 – J. Pat O'Malley, English actor (died 1985)
- March 20 – B. F. Skinner, American behavioral psychologist (died 1990)
- March 22 – Itche Goldberg, Yiddish author (died 2006)
- March 26
  - Gustave Biéler, Swiss-born hero of World War II (executed) (died 1944)
  - Joseph Campbell, American author on mythology (died 1987)
  - Emilio Fernández, Mexican film director, actor and screenwriter (died 1986)
- March 30 – Alexandrina of Balazar, Portuguese Roman Catholic mystic, victim soul and blessed (died 1955)

=== April ===
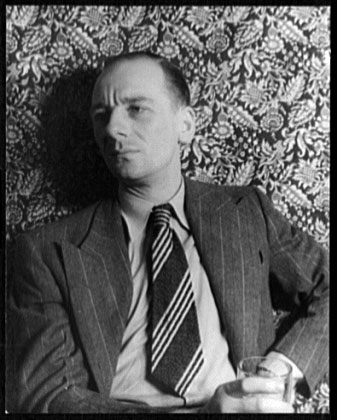
John Gielgud

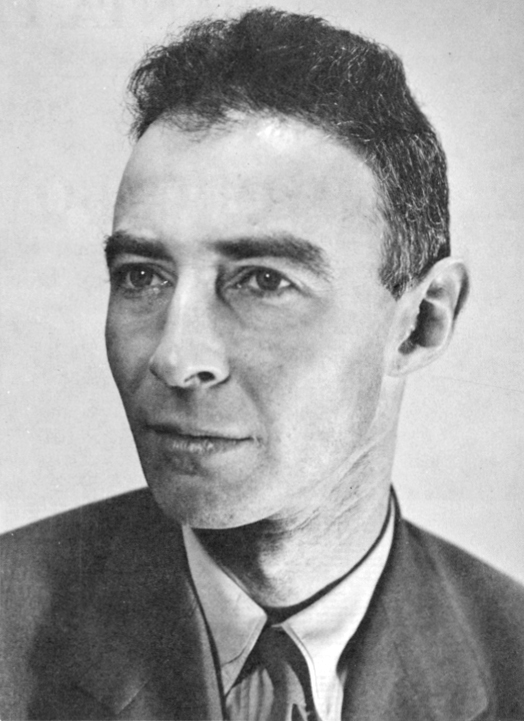
J. Robert Oppenheimer

- April 1 – Nikolai Berzarin, Soviet general (died 1945)
- April 3 – Sally Rand, American dancer, actress (died 1979)
- April 4 – Soeman Hs, Indonesian author, educator (died 1999)
- April 6 – Kurt Georg Kiesinger, Chancellor of West Germany (died 1988)
- April 8 – John Hicks, English economist, Nobel Prize laureate (died 1989)
- April 13 – Elwood Richard Quesada, American air force general (died 1993)
- April 14 – John Gielgud, English actor (died 2000)
- April 15 – Arshile Gorky, Armenian-born American painter (died 1948)
- April 22 – J. Robert Oppenheimer, American physicist (died 1967)
- April 24 – Willem de Kooning, Dutch artist (died 1997)
- April 26
  - Jimmy McGrory, Scottish footballer (died 1982)
  - Xenophon Zolotas, Prime Minister of Greece (died 2004)
- April 27 – Cecil Day-Lewis, English poet (died 1972)
- April 29 – Pedro Vargas, Mexican singer, actor (died 1989)

=== May ===
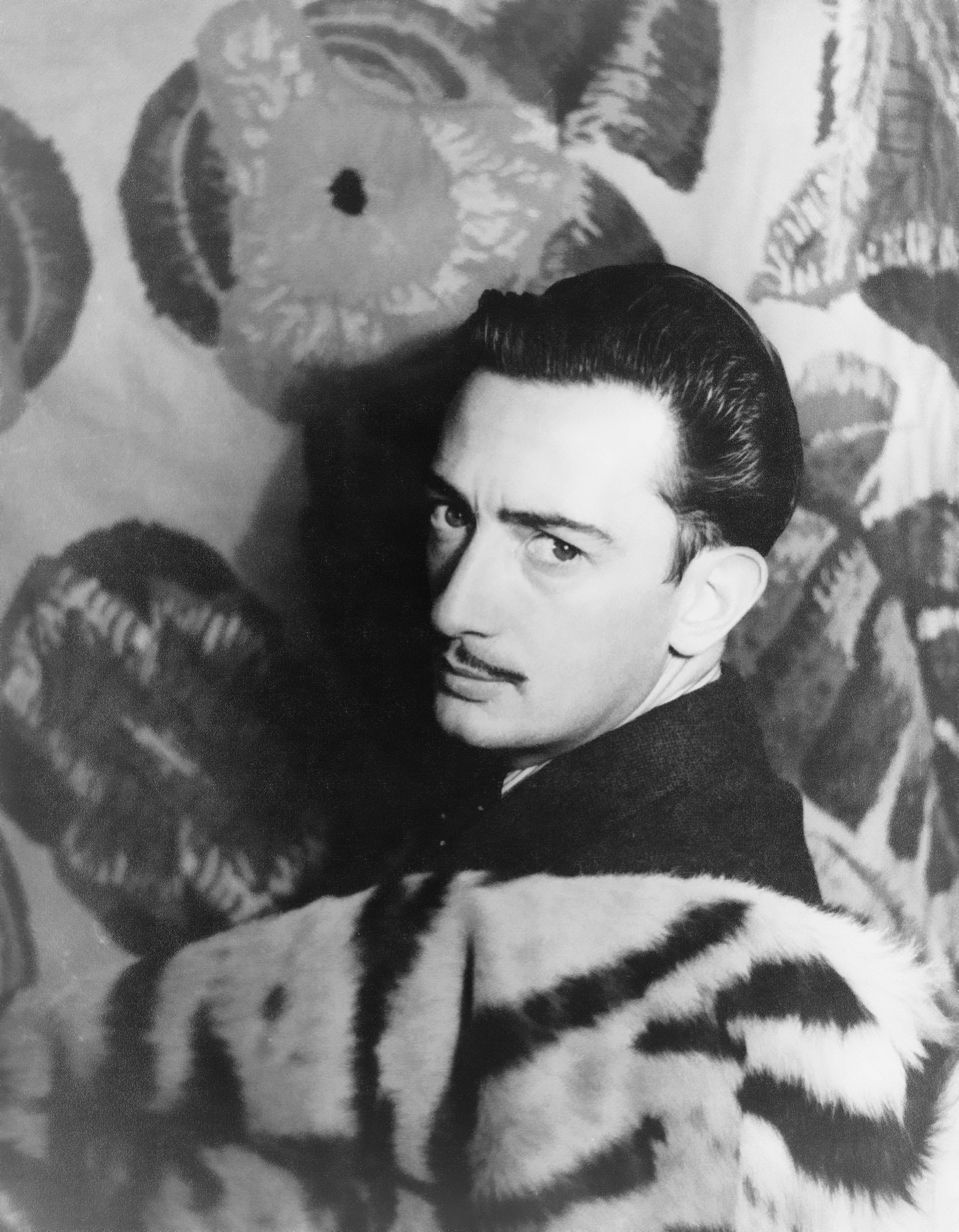
Salvador Dalí

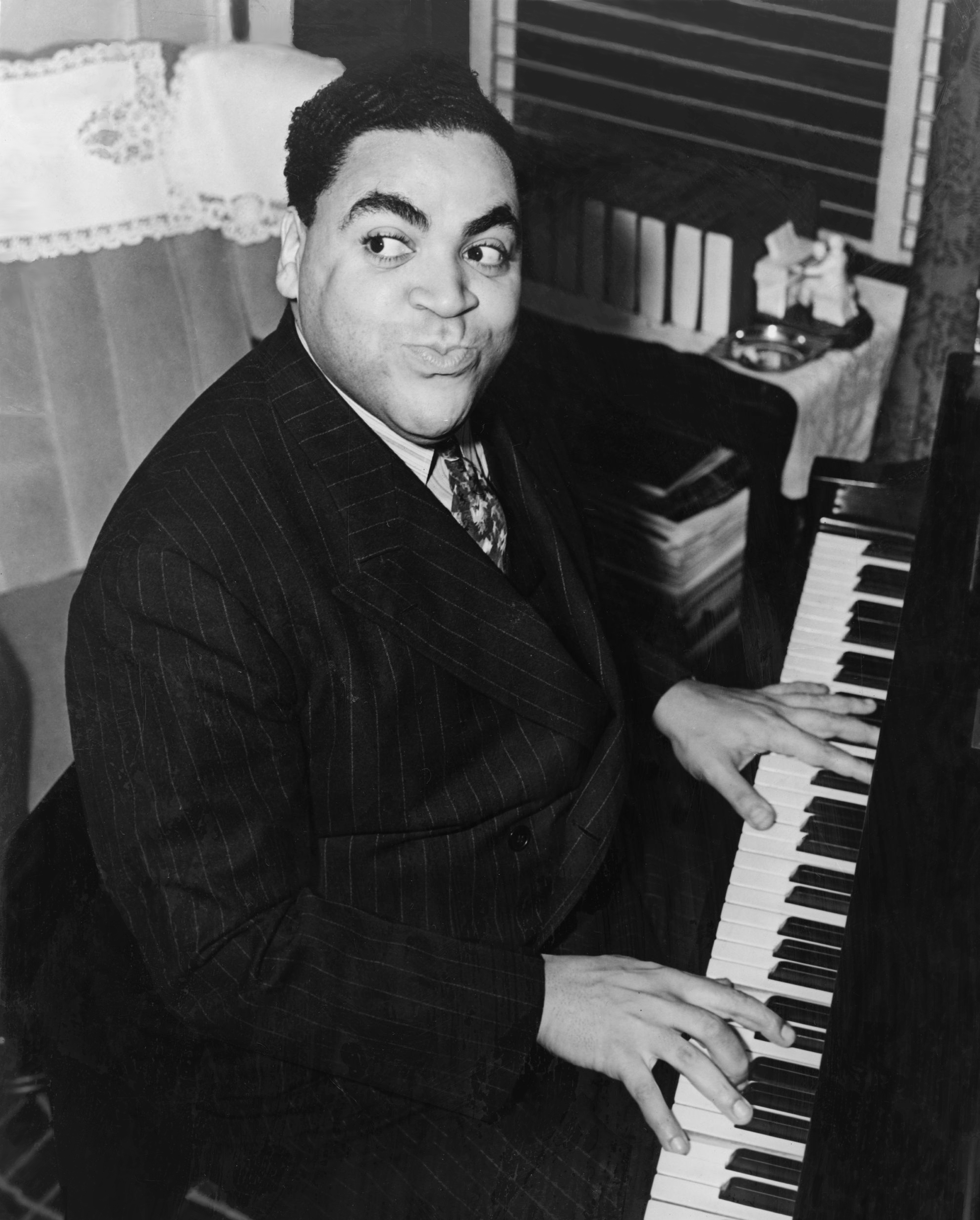
Fats Waller

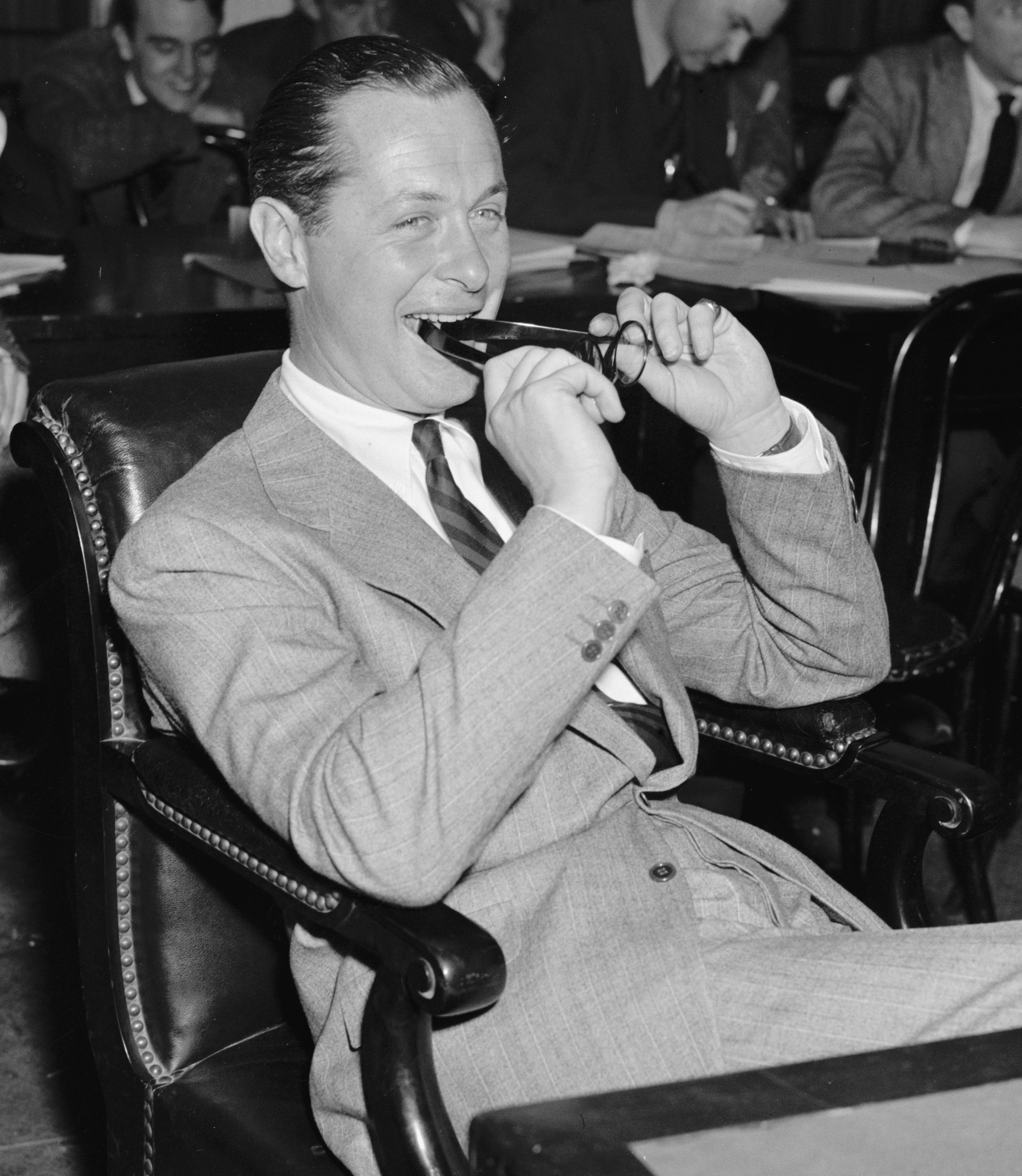
Robert Montgomery

- May 4
  - Joaquín García Morato, Spanish fighter ace (died 1939)
- May 6
  - Raymond Bailey, American actor (died 1980)
  - Moshé Feldenkrais, Ukrainian-born engineer (died 1984)
  - Harry Martinson, Swedish writer, Nobel Prize laureate (died 1978)
- May 11 – Salvador Dalí, Spanish artist (died 1989)
- May 17 – Jean Gabin, French actor (died 1976)
- May 20 – Margery Allingham, British detective fiction writer (died 1966)
- May 21
  - Robert Montgomery, American actor, director (died 1981)
  - Fats Waller, American pianist, comedian (died 1943)
- May 24 – Chūhei Nambu, Japanese athlete (died 1997)
- May 25 – Charles L. Melson, United States Navy admiral (died 1981)
- May 26 – George Formby, English singer, comedian (died 1961)

=== June ===
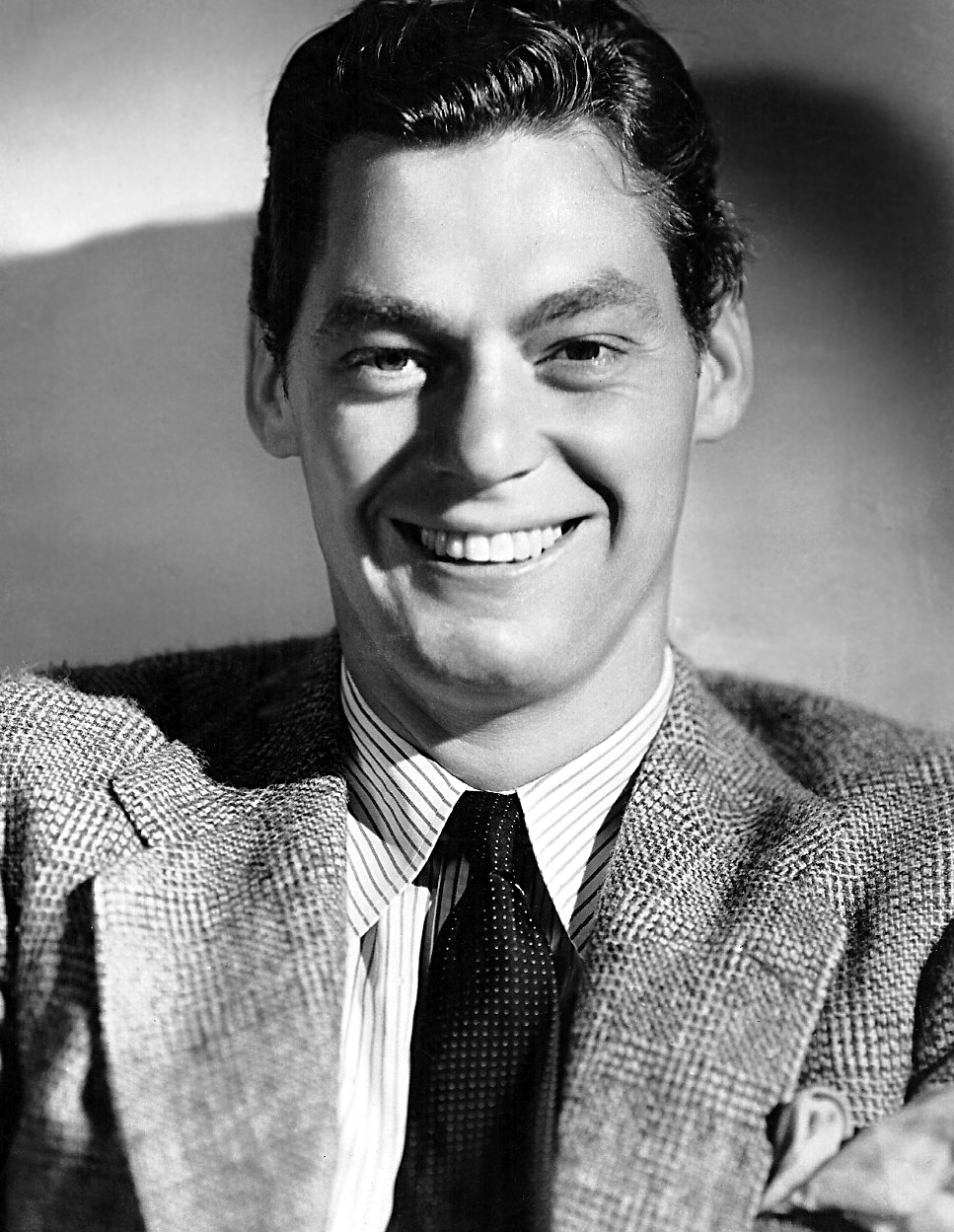
Johnny Weissmuller

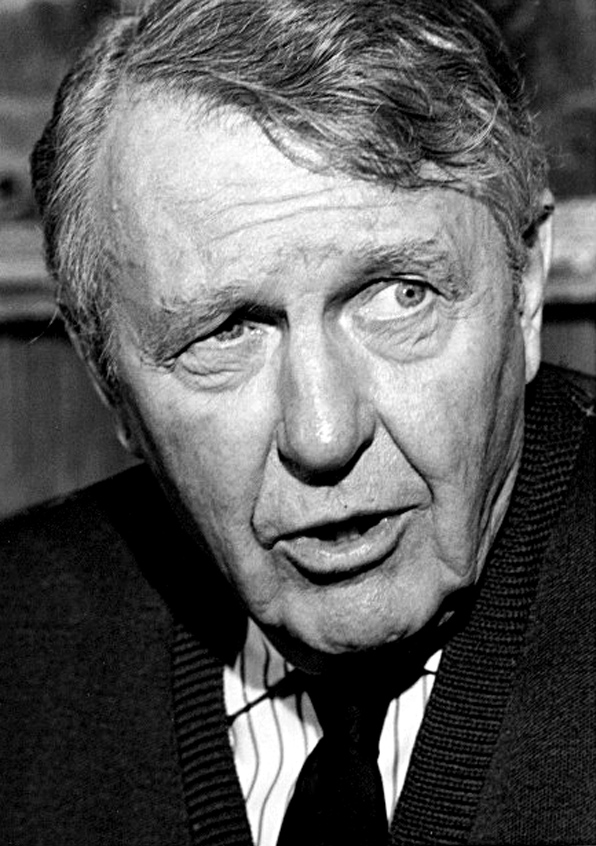
Ralph Bellamy

- June 2 – Johnny Weissmuller, Hungarian-born American swimmer, actor (Tarzan) (died 1984)
- June 3 – Jan Peerce, American tenor (died 1984)
- June 17
  - Ralph Bellamy, American actor (died 1991)
  - J. Vernon McGee, American theologian, pastor, author, and Bible teacher (died 1988)
- June 18 – Keye Luke, Chinese-born American actor (died 1991)
- June 20 – Heinrich von Brentano, German politician (died 1964)
- June 24 – Phil Harris, American actor (died 1995)
- June 26 – Peter Lorre, Hungarian-born American film actor (died 1964)

=== July ===
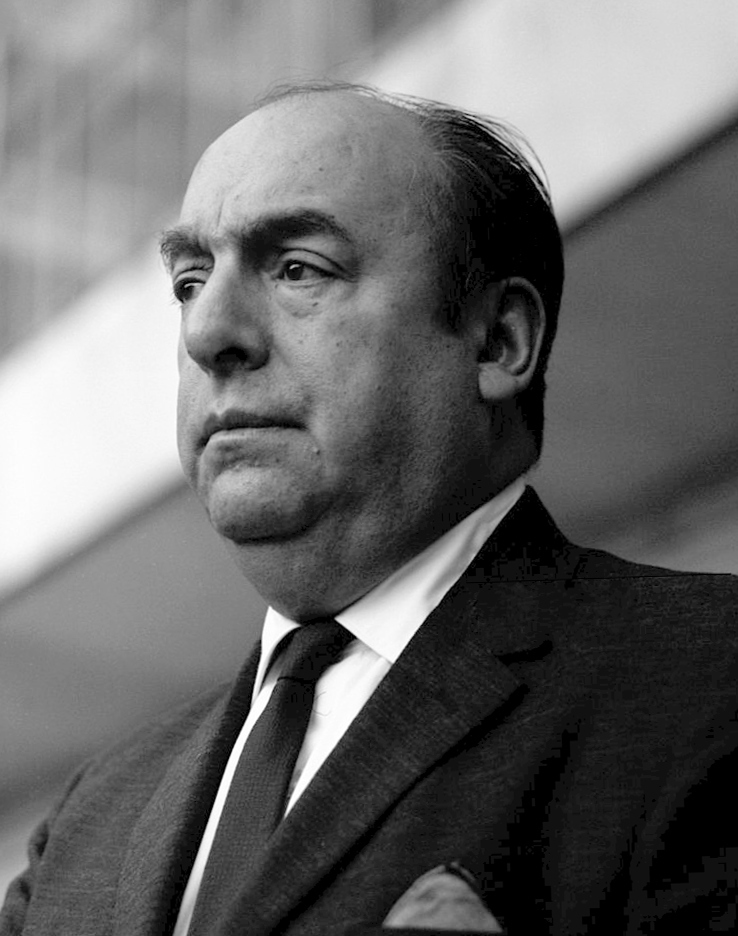
Pablo Neruda

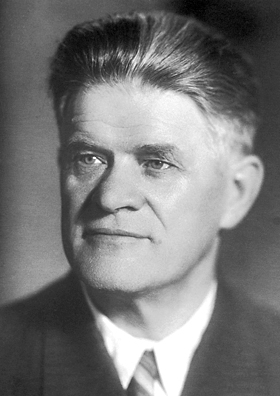
Pavel Cherenkov

- July 1 – Mary Calderone, American physician, public health advocate (died 1998)
- July 2
  - René Lacoste, French tennis player, businessman (died 1996)
  - František Plánička, Czech footballer (died 1996)
- July 5
  - Harold Acton, British writer, scholar, and aesthete (died 1994)
  - Ernst Mayr, German-born American biologist, author (died 2005)
- July 8 – Henri Cartan, French mathematician (died 2008)
- July 10 – Lili Damita, French-American actress, singer (died 1994)
- July 12 – Pablo Neruda, Chilean poet, Nobel Prize laureate (died 1973)
- July 14 – Zita Johann, Austrian-American actress (died 1993)
- July 15
  - Rudolf Arnheim, German-born American author (died 2007)
  - Dorothy Fields, American librettist (died 1974)
- July 19 – Mark Koenig, American baseball shortstop (died 1993)
- July 20 – René Couzinet, French aeronautics engineer, aircraft manufacturer (died 1956)
- July 21
  - Wilhelm Harster, German police officer and war criminal (died 1991)
  - Louis Meyer, American Hall of Fame race car driver (died 1995)
- July 24 – Nikolai Kuznetsov, Soviet admiral (died 1974)
- July 26 – Edwin Albert Link, American inventor (died 1981)
- July 28 – Pavel Cherenkov, Soviet physicist, Nobel Prize laureate (died 1990)
- July 29 – J. R. D. Tata, Indian businessman (died 1993)

=== August ===
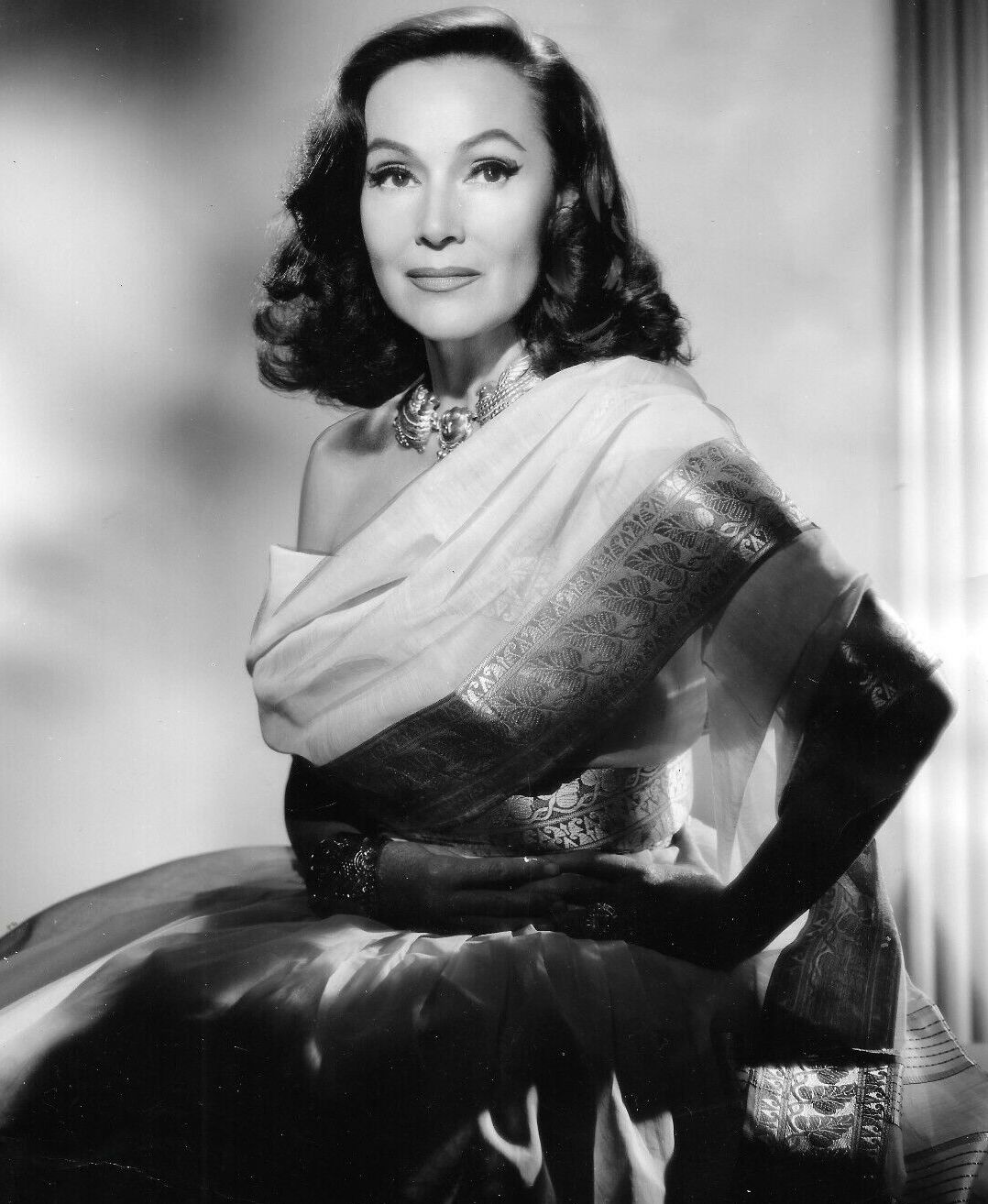
Dolores del Río

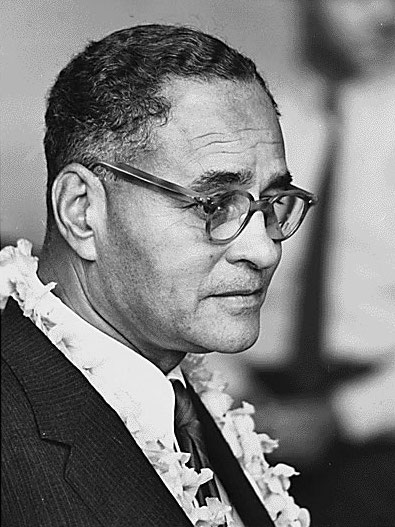
Ralph Bunche

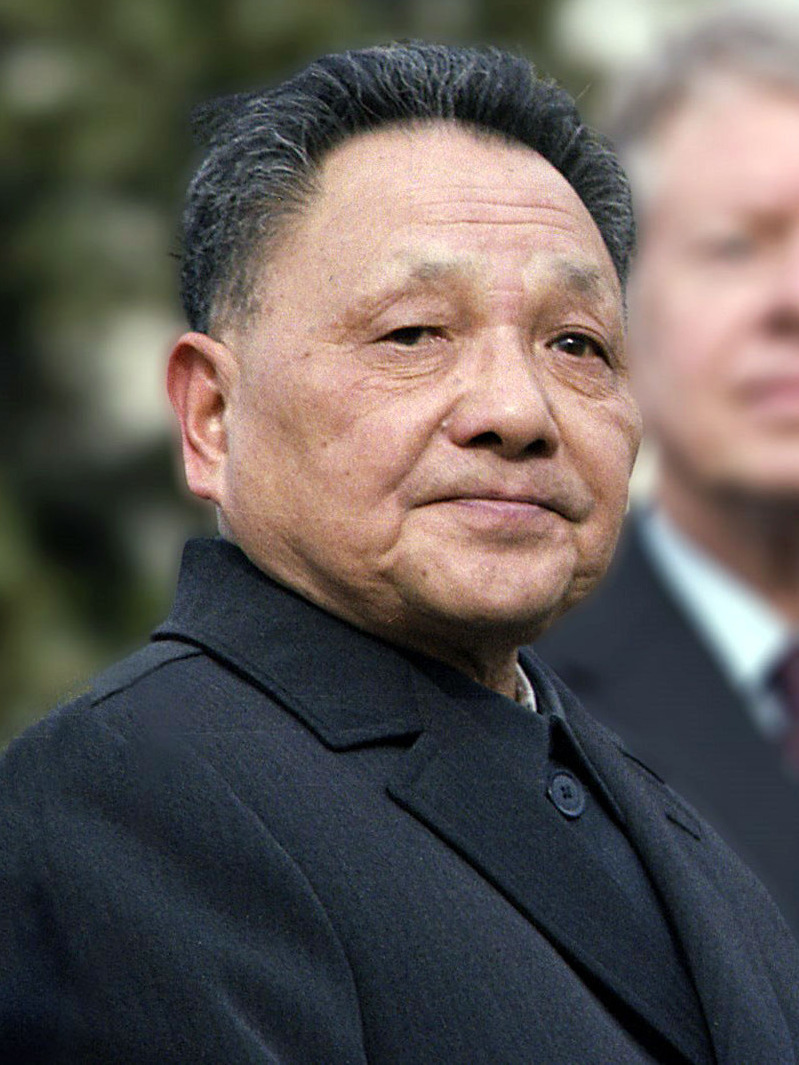
Deng Xiaoping

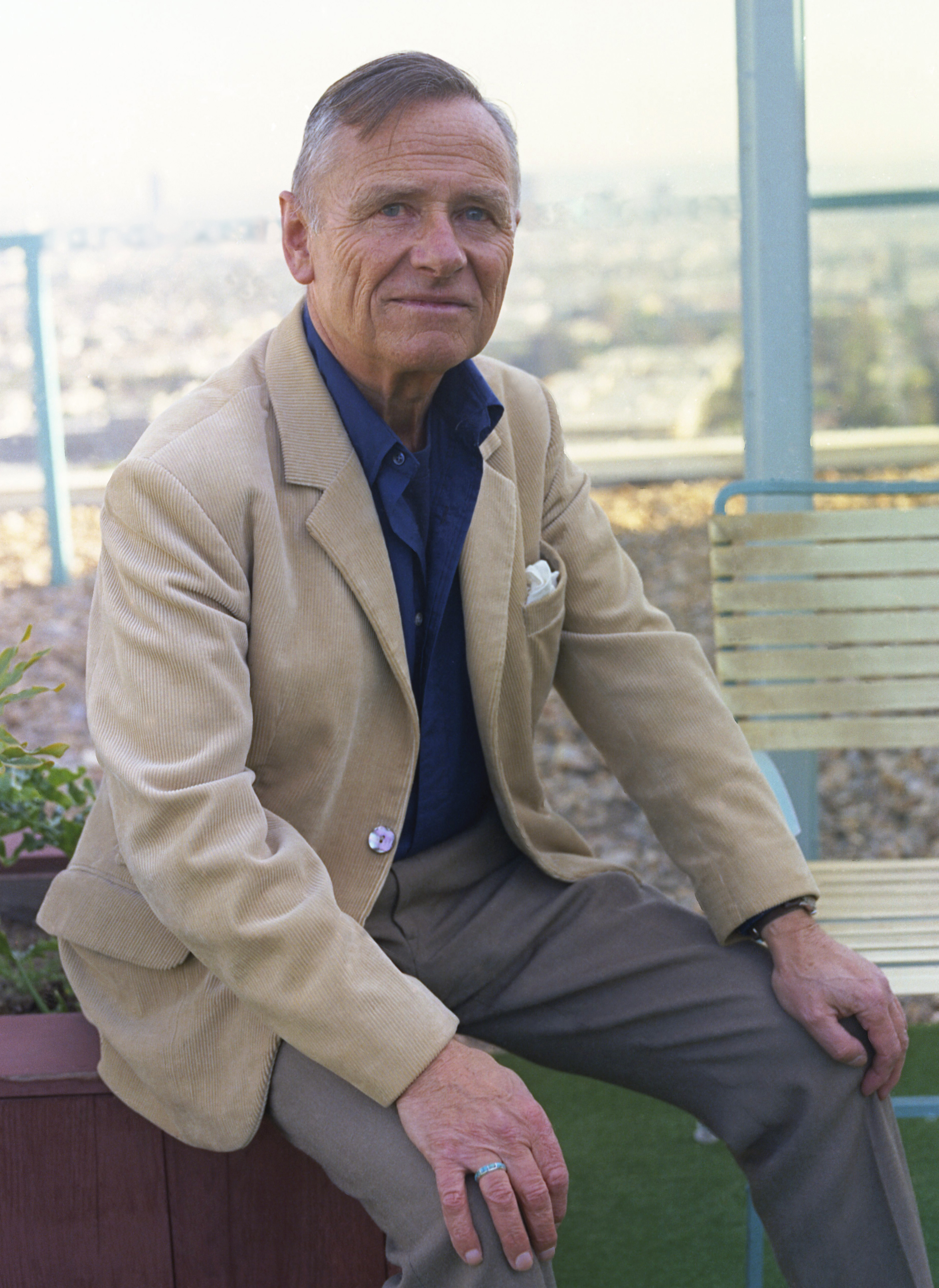
Christopher Isherwood

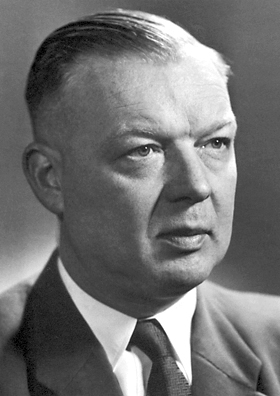
Werner Forssmann

- August 3 – Dolores del Río, Mexican actress (died 1983)
- August 4
  - Witold Gombrowicz, Polish novelist, dramatist (died 1969)
  - Helen Kane, American singer, dancer, comedian and actress (died 1966)
- August 5 – Hugh Greer, American basketball coach (died 1963)
- August 6 – Ballard Berkeley, British actor (died 1988)
- August 7 – Ralph Bunche, American diplomat, recipient of the Nobel Peace Prize (died 1971)
- August 12 – Alexei Nikolaevich, Tsarevich of Russia (died 1918)
- August 13 – Jonathan Hole, American actor (died 1998)
- August 16
  - Minoru Genda, Japanese aviator, naval officer and politician (died 1989)
  - Wendell Meredith Stanley, American chemist, Nobel Prize laureate (died 1971)
- August 21 – Count Basie, African-American musician, bandleader (died 1984)
- August 22 - Deng Xiaoping, Chinese communist leader (died 1997)
- August 23
  - Thelma Furness, Viscountess Furness (born Thelma Morgan), American socialite twin (died 1970)
  - Gloria Morgan Vanderbilt (born Gloria Morgan), American socialite twin (died 1965)
  - William Primrose, Scottish violist (died 1982)
- August 24
  - Mary Burchell, English romantic novelist and campaigner for Jewish refugees, as Ida Cook (died 1986)
  - Aparicio Méndez, 50th President of Uruguay (died 1988)
- August 26 - Christopher Isherwood, English writer (died 1986)
- August 29 – Werner Forssmann, German physician, recipient of the Nobel Prize in Physiology or Medicine (died 1979)

=== September ===
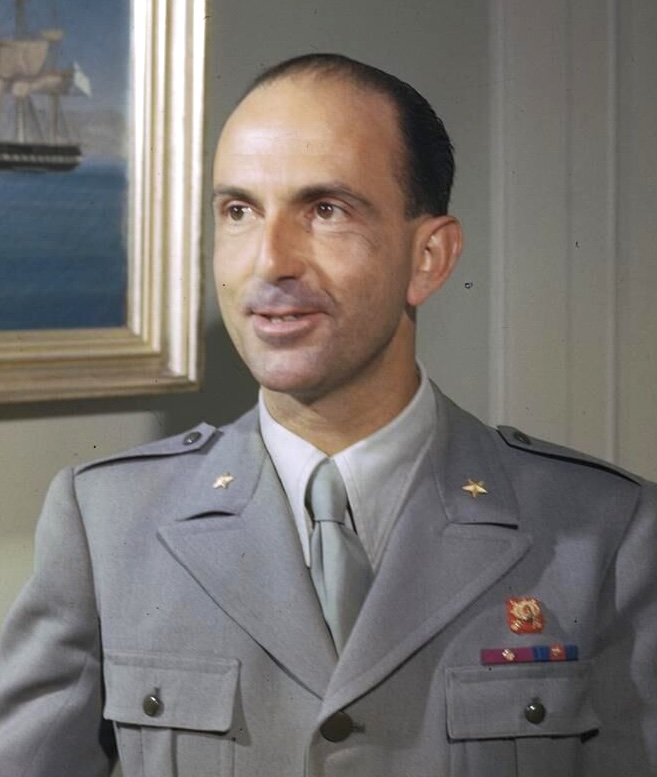
Umberto II of Italy

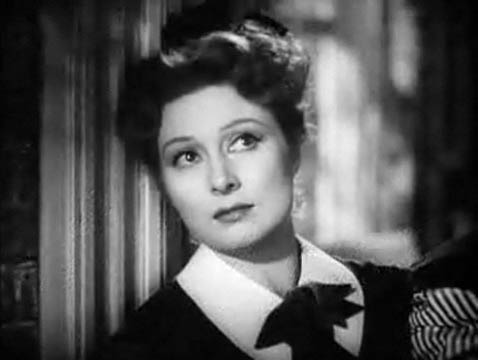
Greer Garson

- September 7 – Daniel Prenn, Russian-born German, Polish, and British tennis player (died 1991)
- September 9 – Feroze Khan, Pakistani field hockey player (died 2005)
- September 13 – Gladys George, American actress (died 1954)
- September 14 – Frank Amyot, Canadian sprint canoeist (died 1962)
- September 15 – Umberto II of Italy, 4th and last King of Italy (died 1983)
- September 29 – Greer Garson, English actress (died 1996)

=== October ===
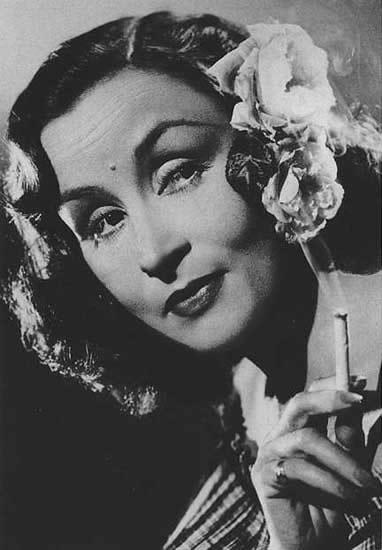
Tita Merello

- October 2
  - Graham Greene, English novelist (died 1991)
  - Lal Bahadur Shastri, 2nd Prime Minister of India (died 1966)
- October 3 – Charles J. Pedersen, American chemist, Nobel Prize laureate (died 1989)
- October 11 – Tita Merello, Argentine actress, singer and tango dancer (died 2002)
- October 20 – Tommy Douglas, Scottish-born Premier of Saskatchewan and pioneer of medicare (died 1986)

=== November ===
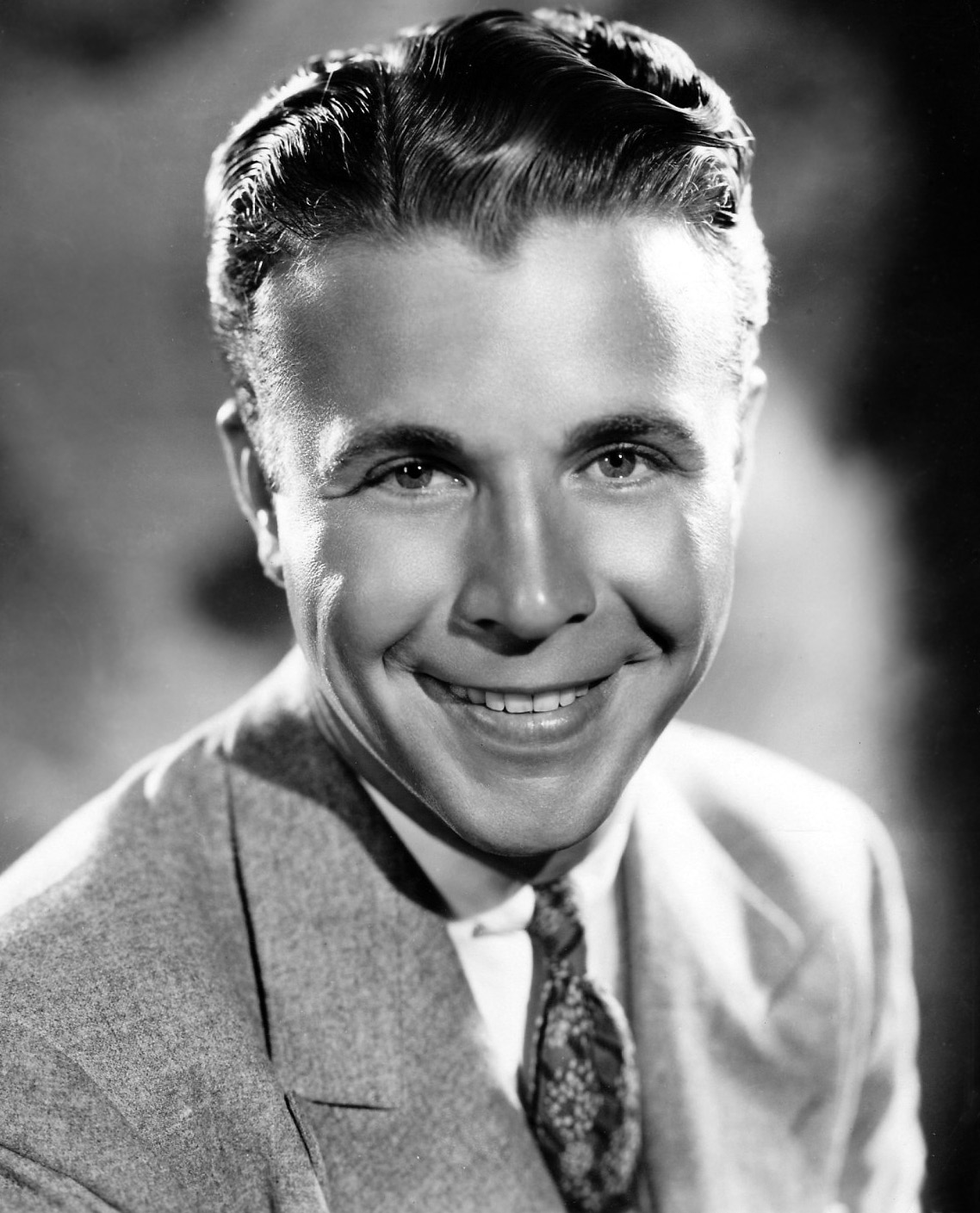
Dick Powell

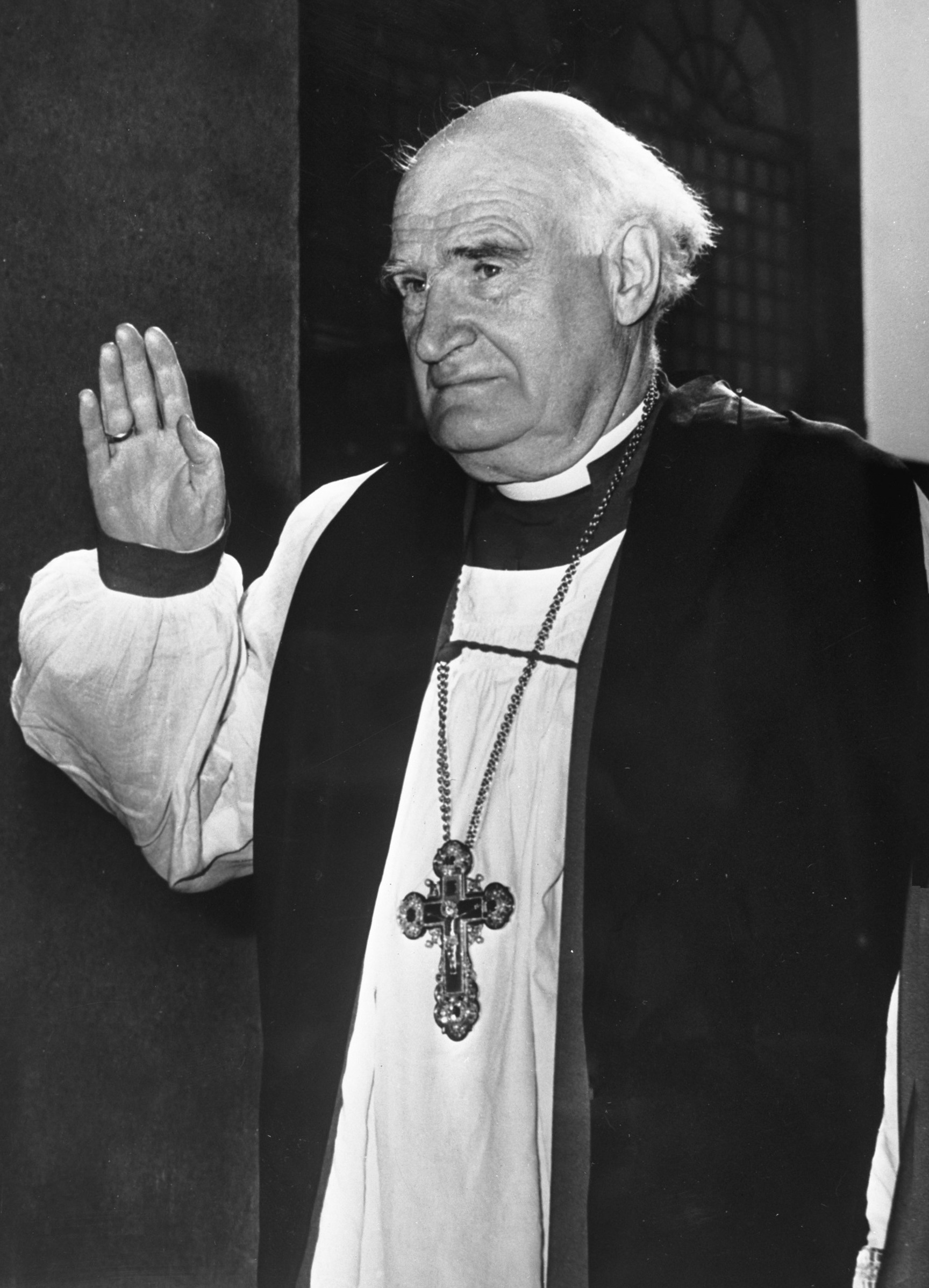
Michael Ramsey

- November 1 – Laura La Plante, American silent film actress (died 1996)
- November 4 – Horace Mann Bond, American historian and college administrator (died 1972)
- November 11
  - J. H. C. Whitehead, British mathematician (died 1960)
  - Alger Hiss, American lawyer, government official, author and lecturer (died 1996)
- November 12 – Jacques Tourneur, French director (died 1977)
- November 14
  - Dick Powell, American actor, singer (died 1963)
  - Michael Ramsey, Archbishop of Canterbury (died 1988)
- November 16 – Nnamdi Azikiwe, 1st President of Nigeria (died 1996)
- November 22 – Louis Néel, French physicist, Nobel Prize laureate (died 2000)
- November 25 – Lillian Copeland, American Olympic athlete (died 1964)
- November 30 – Clyfford Still, American painter (died 1980)

=== December ===
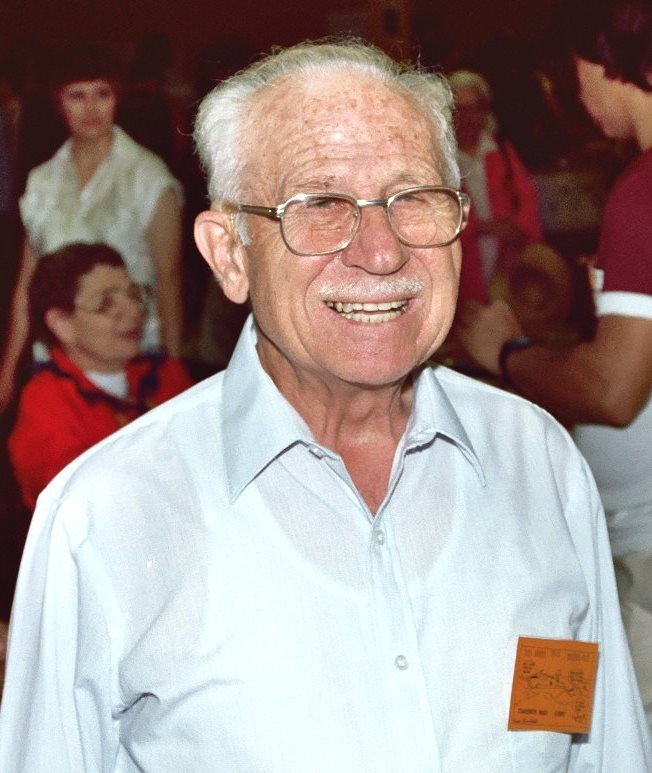
Clarence Nash

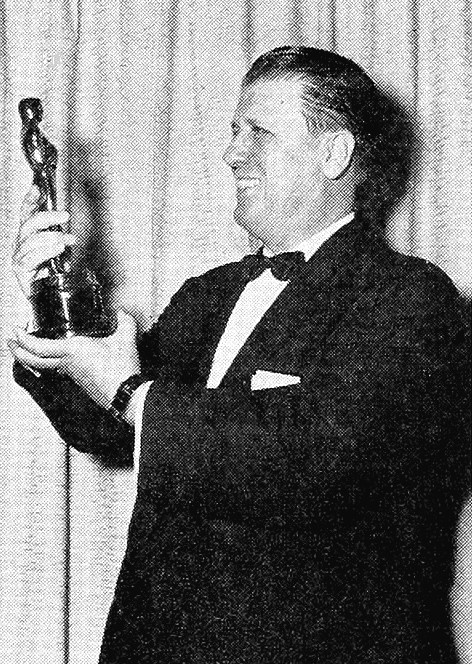
George Stevens

- December 3 – Roberto Marinho, Brazilian publisher, businessman and media mogul (died 2003)
- December 4 – Albert Norden, German politician (died 1982)
- December 6 – Ève Curie, French author (died 2007)
- December 7 – Clarence Nash, American voice actor (died 1985)
- December 10 – Antonín Novotný, 7th President of Czechoslovakia (died 1975)
- December 12 – Baron Nicolas de Gunzburg, French-born magazine editor, socialite (died 1981)
- December 17 – Paul Cadmus, American artist (died 1999)
- December 18 – George Stevens, American film director (died 1975)
- December 20 – Rambai Barni, queen consort of King Prajadhipok of Siam, (died 1984)
- December 21 – Jean René Bazaine, French painter (died 2001)
- December 24
  - Joseph M. Juran, American engineer, philanthropist (died 2008)
  - Herbert D. Riley, United States Navy admiral (died 1973)
- December 25
  - Gerhard Herzberg, German-born Canadian chemist, Nobel Prize laureate (died 1999)
  - Flemmie Pansy Kittrell, American nutritionist (died 1980)
- December 26 – Alejo Carpentier, Cuban writer (died 1980)
- December 27 – Linwood G. Dunn, American special effects artist (died 1998)
- December 30
  - Dmitri Kabalevsky, Russian composer (died 1987)
  - David M. Shoup, American general (died 1983)

== Deaths ==
=== January ===
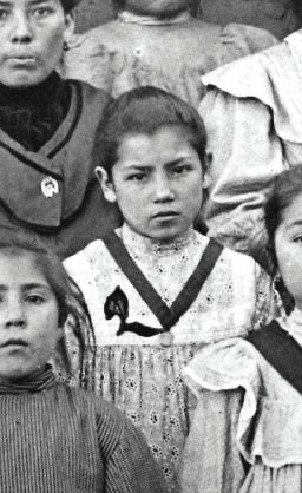
Blessed Laura Vicuña

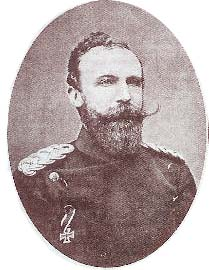
Frederick I, Duke of Anhalt

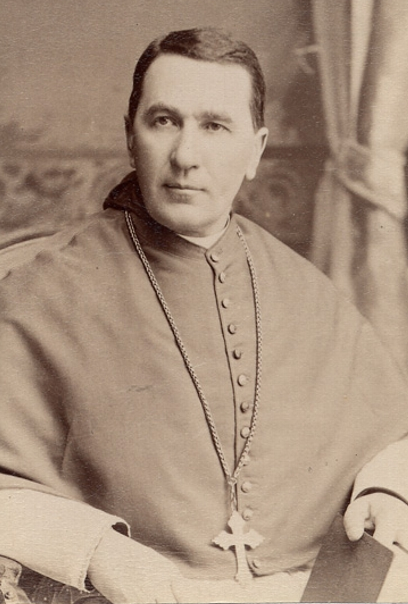
Elphège Gravel

- January 1 – Frederick Pabst, German-American brewer (born 1836)
- January 2
  - Mathilde Bonaparte, French princess (born 1820)
  - James Longstreet, American Confederate Civil War general (born 1821)
- January 7
  - Parke Godwin, American journalist (born 1816)
  - Friedrich von Hefner-Alteneck, German engineer (born 1845)
  - Emmanuel Rhoides, Greek writer (born 1836)
- January 9
  - John Brown Gordon, American general and politician, 53rd Governor of Georgia (born 1832)
  - Hannah Lynch, Irish translator (born 1859)
- January 10 – Jean-Léon Gérôme, French painter (born 1824)
- January 13 – Samuel G. Havermale, American Methodist minister (born 1824)
- January 17
  - Sir Henry Keppel, British admiral (born 1809)
  - Joseph Nirschl, German Roman Catholic theologian (born 1823)
- January 22 – Laura Vicuña, Chilean Roman Catholic holy figure and blessed (born 1891)
- January 23 – Gédéon Bordiau, Belgian architect (born 1832)
- January 24 – Frederick I, Duke of Anhalt (born 1831)
- January 28
  - Karl Emil Franzos, Austrian novelist (born 1848)
  - Elphège Gravel, Canadian Roman Catholic priest and bishop (born 1838)
- January 30
  - Józef Gosławski, Polish architect (born 1865)
  - Phoebe Jane Babcock Wait, American physician (born 1838)

=== February ===
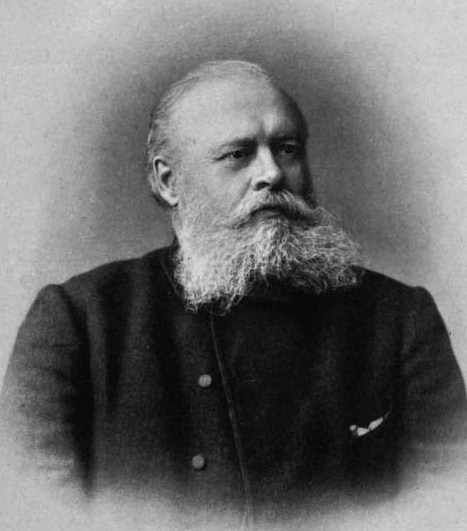
Vladimir Markovnikov

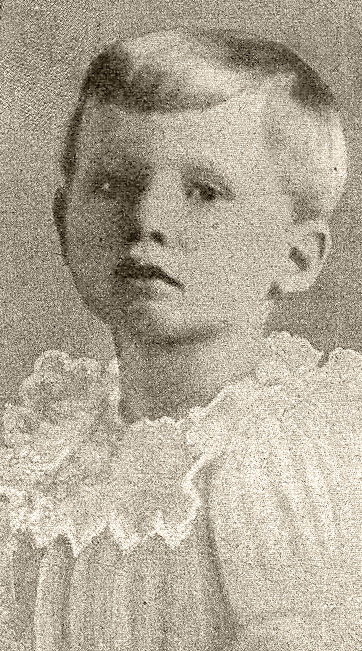
Prince Henry of Prussia

- February 3 – John James McDannold, U.S. Representative from Illinois (born 1851)
- February 8
  - Alfred Ainger, British biographer (born 1837)
  - Malvina Garrigues, Portuguese soprano (born 1825)
- February 10 – Nikolay Mikhaylovsky, Russian writer (born 1842)
- February 11 – Vladimir Markovnikov, Russian chemist (born 1838)
- February 12 – Rudolf Maison, German sculptor (born 1854)
- February 13
  - John Ellison-Macartney, Irish politician (born 1818)
  - Émile Metz, Luxembourgish politician, industrialist and engineer (born 1835)
- February 14 – Alvinza Hayward, American financier and businessman (born 1822)
- February 15 – Mark Hanna, United States Senator from Ohio (born 1837)
- February 17 – Hermann Emminghaus, German psychiatrist (born 1845)
- February 19 – Alice Sudduth Byerly, American temperance activist (born 1855)
- February 22 – Sir Leslie Stephen, British writer and critic (born 1832)
- February 26 – Prince Henry of Prussia (born 1900)
- February 27 – Richard Hawksworth Barnes, English coffee grower, naturalist and meteorologist (born 1831)
- February 28 – Anthony Durier, American Roman Catholic bishop (born 1833)
- February 29 – Antonio De Martino, Italian physician (born 1815)

=== March ===
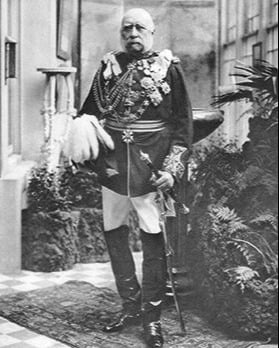
Prince George, Duke of Cambridge

- March 2 – Mary C. Billings, American evangelist and missionary (born 1824)
- March 5
  - John Lowther du Plat Taylor, British founder of the Army Post Office Corps (born 1829)
  - Alfred von Waldersee, Imperial German Army marshal (born 1832)
- March 7 – Ferdinand André Fouqué, French geologist (born 1828)
- March 12 – Oliver Harriman, American businessman (born 1829)
- March 14 – Friedrich Wilhelm Alexander von Mechow, Prussian explorer (born 1831)
- March 17
  - Prince George, Duke of Cambridge, grandson of King George III (born 1819)
  - William Elbridge Sewell, American naval officer, Governor of Guam (born 1851)
- March 21 – Aurélie Ghika, French writer (born 1820)
- March 24 – Emma Herwegh, German writer (born 1817)
- March 31
  - Mifflin E. Bell, American architect (born 1847)
  - Valentine Blake Dillon, Irish politician (born 1847)

=== April ===
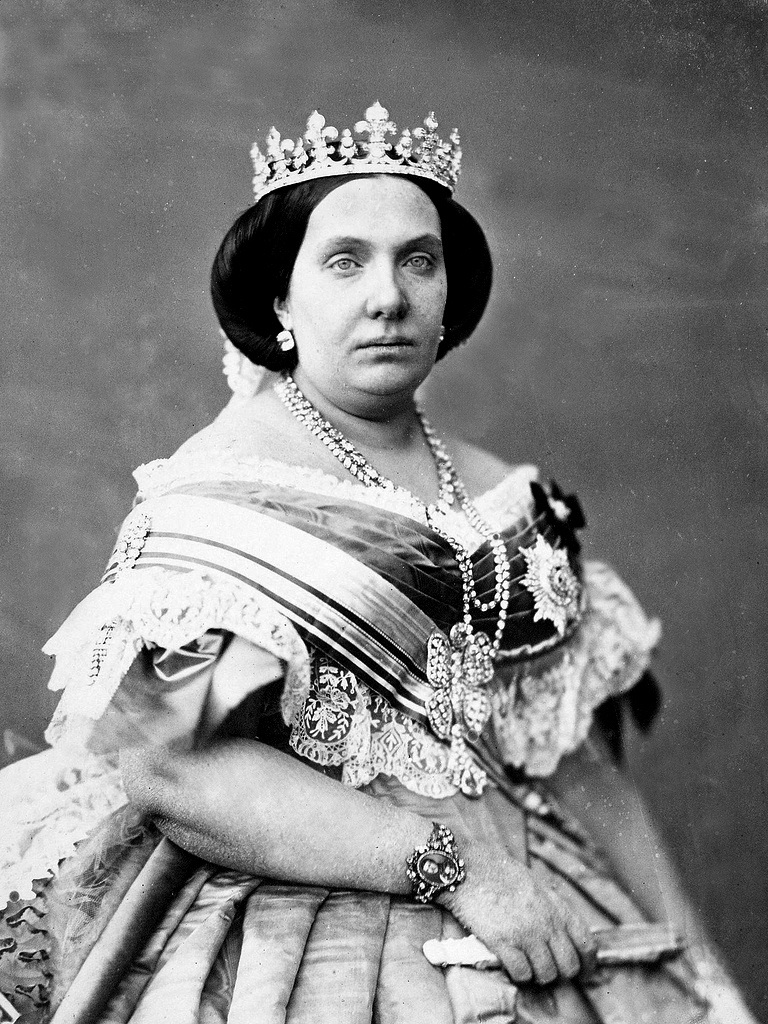
Queen Isabella II of Spain

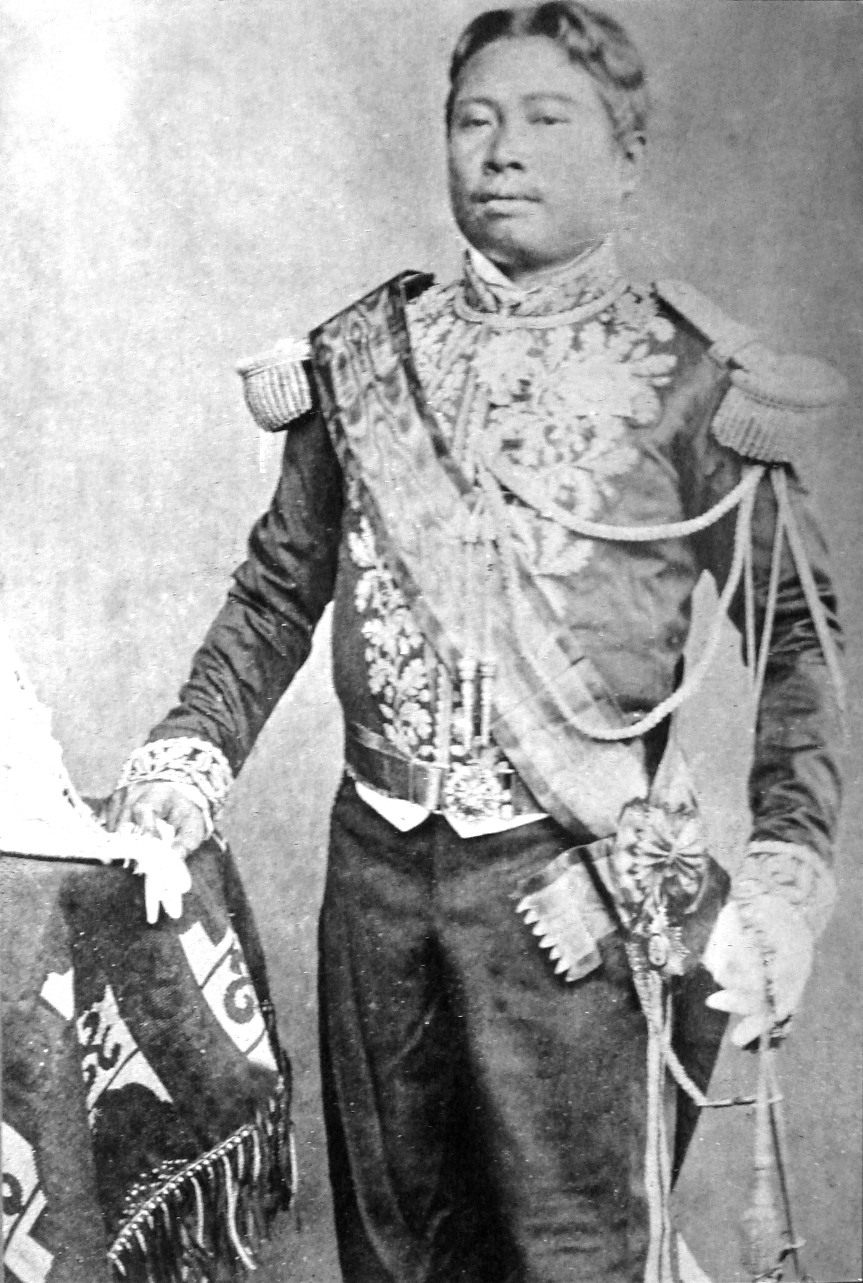
King Norodom of Cambodia

- April 1 – Abby Morton Diaz, American teacher (born 1821)
- April 3
  - Princess Edward of Saxe-Weimar (born 1827)
  - Théophile Pépin, French mathematician (born 1826)
  - Princess Piyamavadi Sri Bajarindra Mata (born 1838)
- April 5 – Tom Allen, British boxing champion (born 1840)
- April 6
  - Émile de Kératry, French author (born 1832)
  - Princess Sophie of Baden (born 1834)
- April 9 – Queen Isabella II of Spain (born 1830)
- April 12 – Elizaveta Akhmatova, Russian translator (born 1820)
- April 13 – Stepan Makarov, Russian admiral (killed in action) (born 1849)
- April 15 – Maximilian Kronberger, German poet (born 1888)
- April 17 – Joe Cain, American Mardi Gras parade organizer (born 1832)
- April 20 – Sara Jane Lippincott, American journalist (born 1823)
- April 21 – Piatus of Mons, Belgian Roman Catholic theologian (born 1815)
- April 24 – Norodom of Cambodia, King of Cambodia (born 1834)
- April 27 – Mykhailo Starytsky, Ukrainian poet and writer (born 1840)

=== May ===
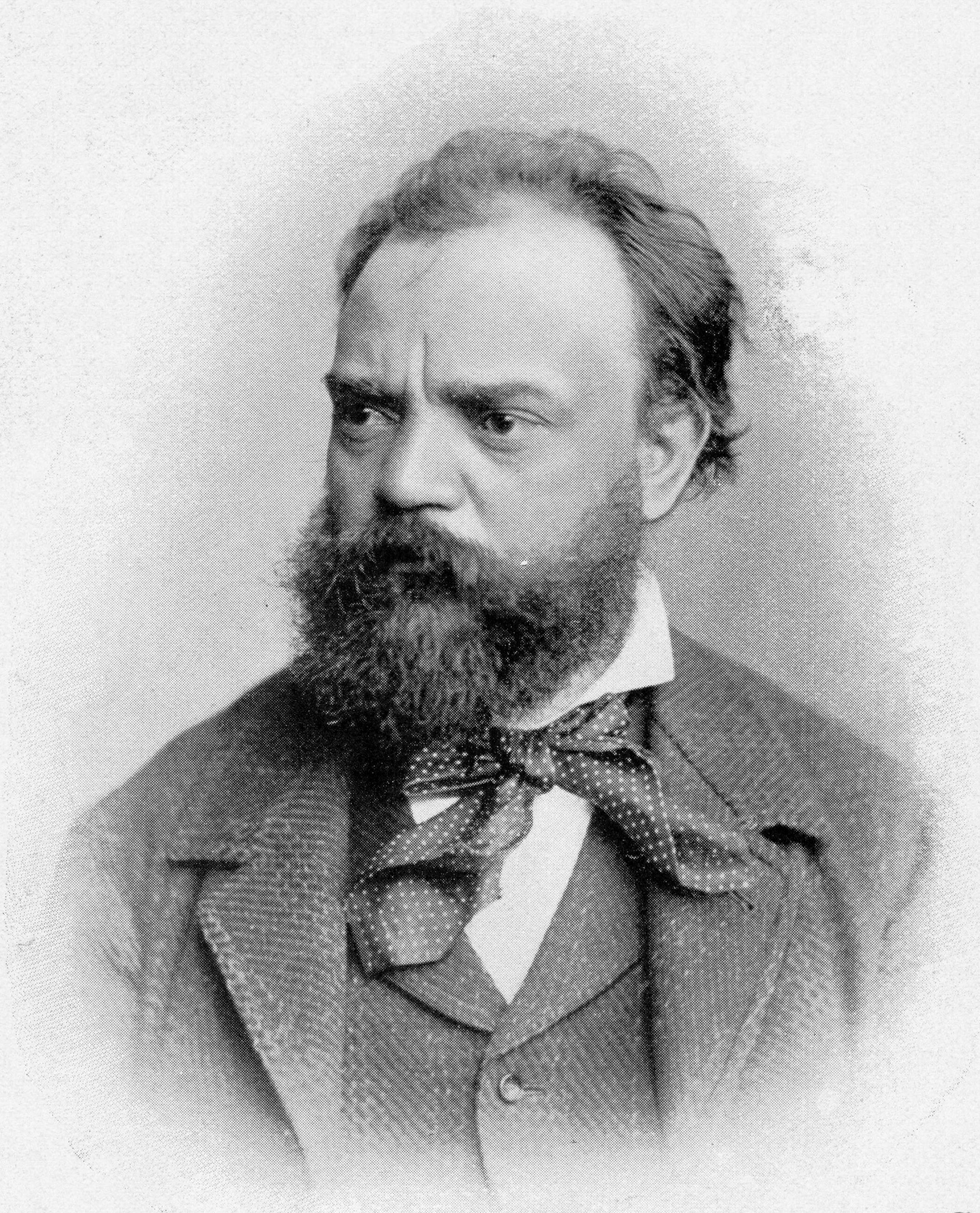
Antonín Dvořák

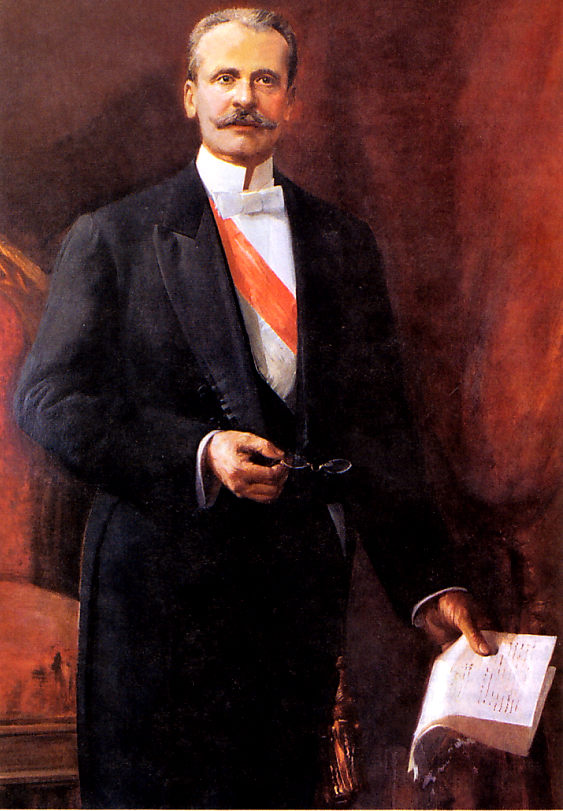
Manuel Candamo

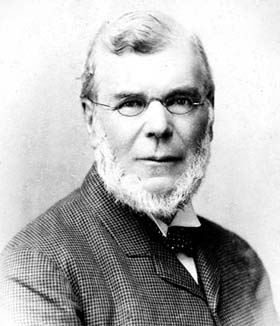
George Johnston Allman

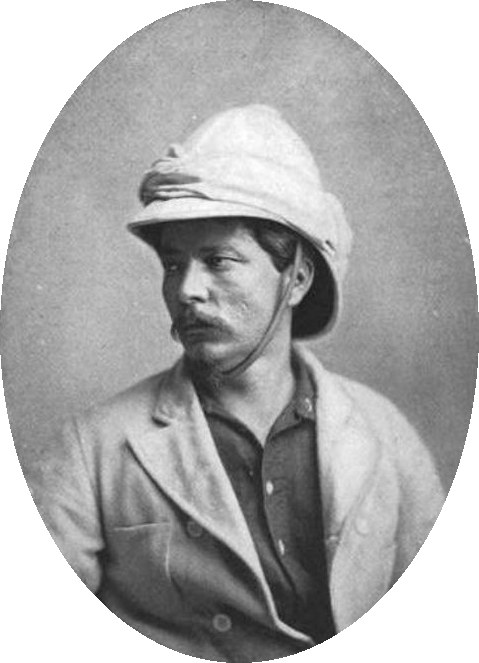
Henry Morton Stanley

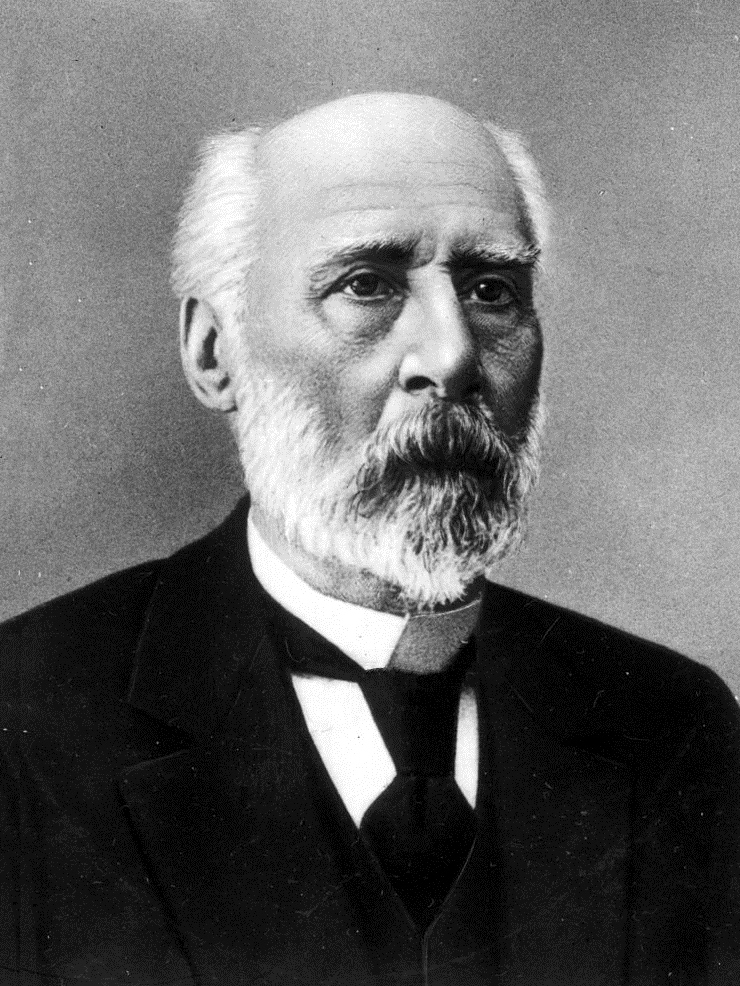
Fyodor Bredikhin

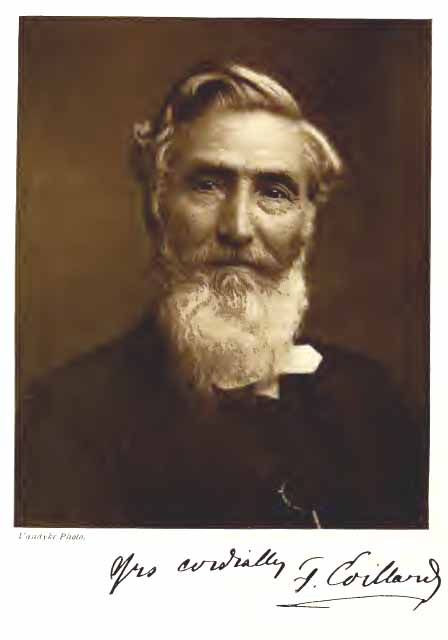
François Coillard

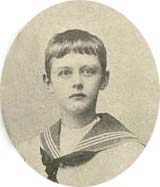
Duke Paul Frederick of Mecklenburg

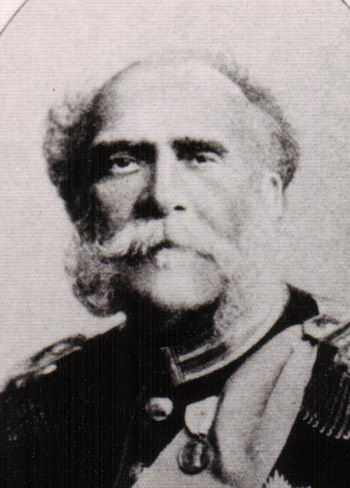
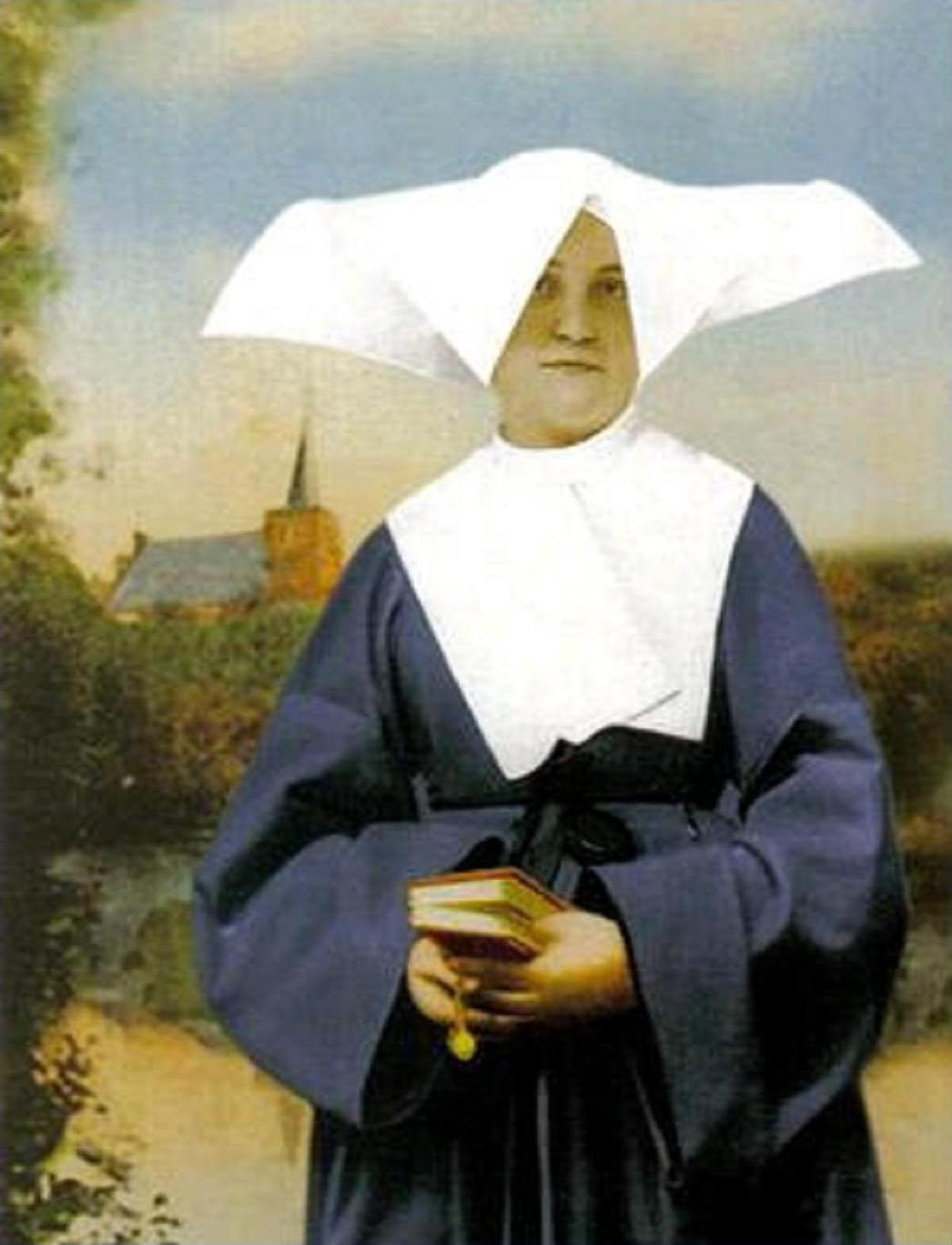
Frederick William, Grand Duke of Mecklenburg-Strelitz and Blessed Marta Anna Wiecka died on May 30, 1904
- May – Henry F. Frizzell, American soldier (born 1839)
- May 1
  - Antonín Dvořák, Czech composer (born 1841)
  - Wilhelm His Sr., Swiss anatomist (born 1831)
- May 2
  - Émile Duclaux, French microbiologist (born 1840)
  - Mathilde Esch, Austrian genre painter (born 1815)
  - Edgar Fawcett, American poet and novelist (born 1847)
- May 3 – Tycho Kielland, Norwegian jurist and journalist (born 1854)
- May 6
  - Franz von Lenbach, German painter (born 1836)
  - Alexander William Williamson, English chemist (born 1824)
- May 7
  - Manuel Candamo, Peruvian politician, 23rd President of Peru (born 1841)
  - Émile-Jules Dubois, French doctor (born 1853)
- May 8
  - Richard Xavier Baxter, Canadian Roman Catholic priest and venerable (born 1821)
  - Eadweard Muybridge, British photographer and motion picture pioneer (born 1830)
- May 9
  - George Johnston Allman, Irish mathematician, scholar and historian (born 1824)
  - Aleksandar Bresztyenszky, Croatian writer (born 1843)
  - Bonaventura Gargiulo, Italian Capuchin friar and Roman Catholic bishop (born 1843)
- May 10
  - Émile Sarrau, French chemist (born 1837)
  - Sir Henry Morton Stanley, British explorer (born 1841)
- May 11
  - Hans Grisebach, German architect (born 1846)
- May 12 – Isabella Eugénie Boyer, French model (born 1841)
- May 13
  - Walter Carpenter, British admiral (born 1834)
  - Eugen Kumičić, Croatian writer (born 1850)
  - Ottokar Lorenz, German genealogist (born 1832)
- May 14
  - Rita Barcelo y Pages, Spanish Augustinian religious sister and servant of God (born 1843)
  - Fyodor Bredikhin, Russian astronomer (born 1831)
- May 15 – Étienne-Jules Marey, French inventor (born 1830)
- May 16 – Harold Finch-Hatton, British politician (born 1856)
- May 17
  - Tomás Cámara y Castro, Spanish Roman Catholic bishop (born 1847)
  - Princess Pauline of Saxe-Weimar-Eisenach (born 1852)
- May 19
  - Auguste Molinier, French historian (born 1851)
  - Jamsetji Tata, Indian industrialist (born 1839)
- May 21 – Duke Paul Frederick of Mecklenburg (born 1882)
- May 22 – Charles Elwood Brown, U.S. Representative from Ohio (born 1834)
- May 24 – Duchess Maria Isabella of Württemberg (born 1871)
- May 26 – Mary Ellen Bagnall-Oakeley, English antiquarian, author, and painter (born 1833)
- May 27
  - Anđelko Aleksić, Serbian general (born 1876)
  - François Coillard, French missionary (born 1834)
- May 29 – Manuel María de Zamacona y Murphy, Mexican politician (born 1826)
- May 30
  - Frederick William, Grand Duke of Mecklenburg-Strelitz (born 1819)
  - Marta Anna Wiecka, Polish Roman Catholic religious professed and blessed (born 1874)
  - Laura Joyce Bell, English-American actress (born 1854)

=== June ===
- June 1 – Ivan Kondratyev, Russian writer (born 1849)
- June 4
  - Princess Marie of Hanover (born 1849)
  - Muhammad bin Yahya Hamid ad-Din, Imam of Yemen (born 1839)
  - George Frederick Phillips, Canadian-born American military hero (born 1862)
- June 9 – Kwasi Boachi, Dutch engineer (born 1827)
- June 12 – Camille of Renesse-Breidbach, Belgian count (born 1836)
- June 16
  - Nikolay Bobrikov, Russian soldier, politician and Governor-General of Finland (born 1839)
  - Eugen Schauman, Finnish nationalist, assassin of Nikolay Bobrikov (born 1875)
  - Manuel Uribe Ángel, Colombian physician (born 1822)
- June 18
  - Sami Frashëri, Albanian writer (born 1850)
  - Celia Logan, American actress (born 1837)
- June 22 – Karl Ritter von Stremayr, former Minister-President of Austria (born 1832)
- June 24 – Richard Knill Freeman, British architect (born 1840)
- June 27 – Anatole Jean-Baptiste Antoine de Barthélemy, French archaeologist (born 1821)
- June 28 – Princess and Countess Aurora Pavlovna Demidova (born 1873)
- June 29
  - Pablo de Anda Padilla, Mexican Roman Catholic priest and venerable (born 1830)
  - Tom Emmett, English cricketer (born 1841)

=== July ===
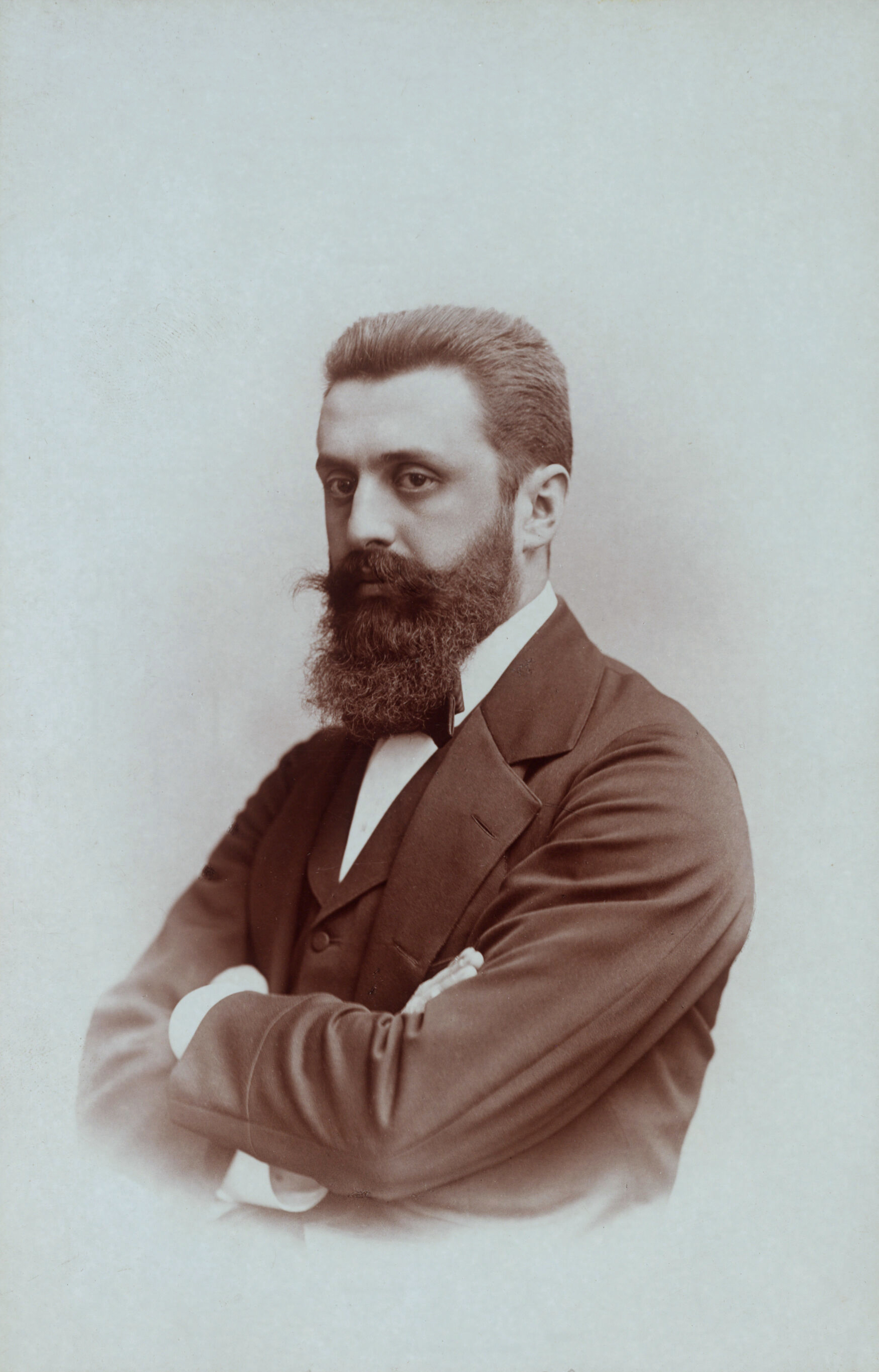
Theodor Herzl

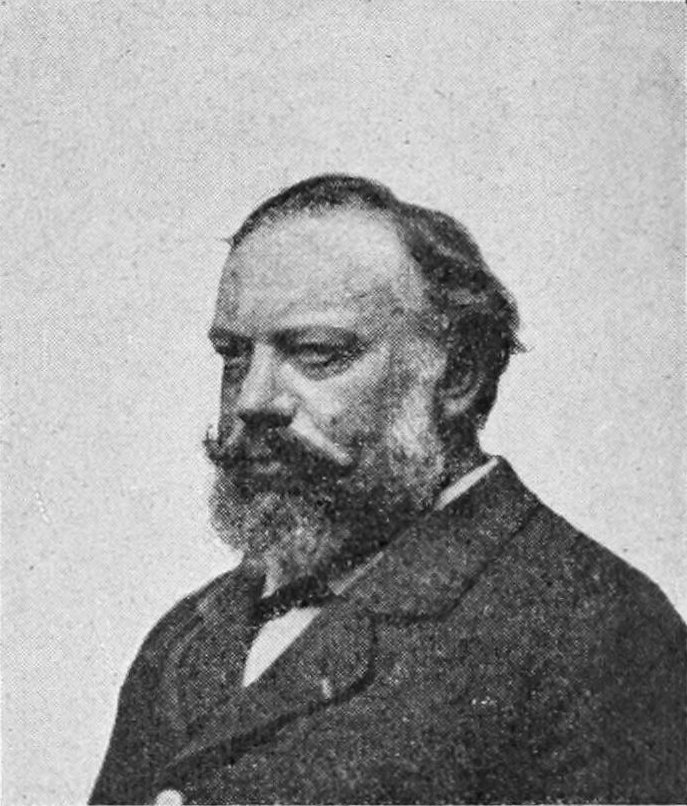
Joseph Blanc

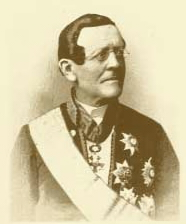
Édouard Thilges

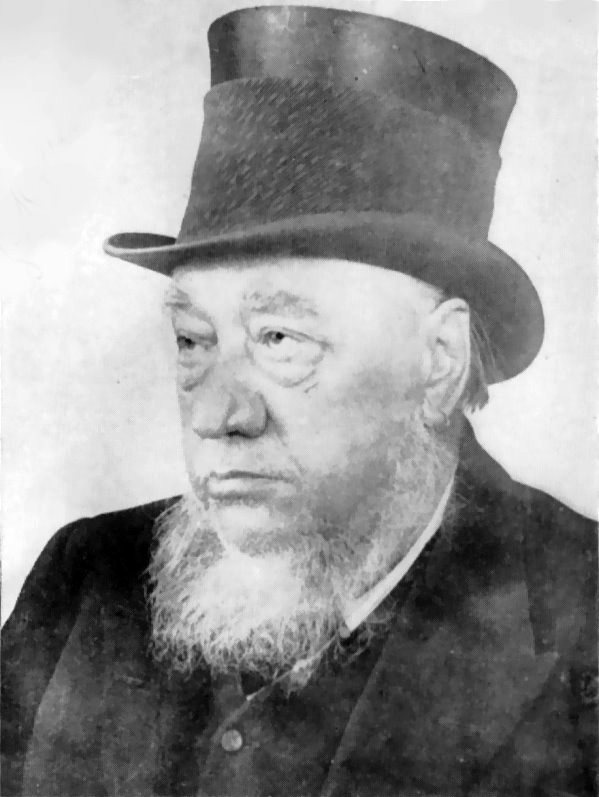
Paul Kruger

- July 1 – George Frederic Watts, British symbolist painter and sculptor (born 1817)
- July 2 – Eugénie Joubert, French Roman Catholic religious professed and blessed (born 1876)
- July 3
  - John Bell Hatcher, American paleontologist (born 1861)
  - Theodor Herzl, Austrian founder of Zionism (born 1860)
- July 4 – Bódog Czorda, Hungarian politician (born 1828)
- July 5
  - Joseph Evans, British-born Australian politician (born 1837)
  - Matsudaira Yasuhide, Japanese daimyō (born 1830)
- July 6 – Abai Qunanbaiuly, Kazakh poet (born 1845)
- July 7 – Adolph Friedländer, German lithographer (born 1851)
- July 8 – Joseph Blanc, French painter (born 1846)
- July 9 – Édouard Thilges, Luxembourgish politician, 7th Prime Minister of Luxembourg (born 1817)
- July 14 – Paul Kruger, South African military and political figure, 3rd President of South Africa (born 1825)
- July 15 – Anton Chekhov, Russian writer (born 1860)
- July 17 – Isaac Roberts, Welsh astronomer (born 1829)
- July 19 – Herbert Campbell, English actor (born 1844)
- July 22 – Wilson Barrett, English actor and playwright (born 1846)
- July 23
  - Isaías Gamboa, Colombian poet (born 1872)
  - Rodolfo Amando Philippi, German–born Chilean paleontologist and zoologist (born 1808)
- July 26 – Henry Clay Taylor, American admiral (born 1845)
- July 30 – Richard A. Harrison, U.S. House of Representatives from Ohio (born 1824)

=== August ===
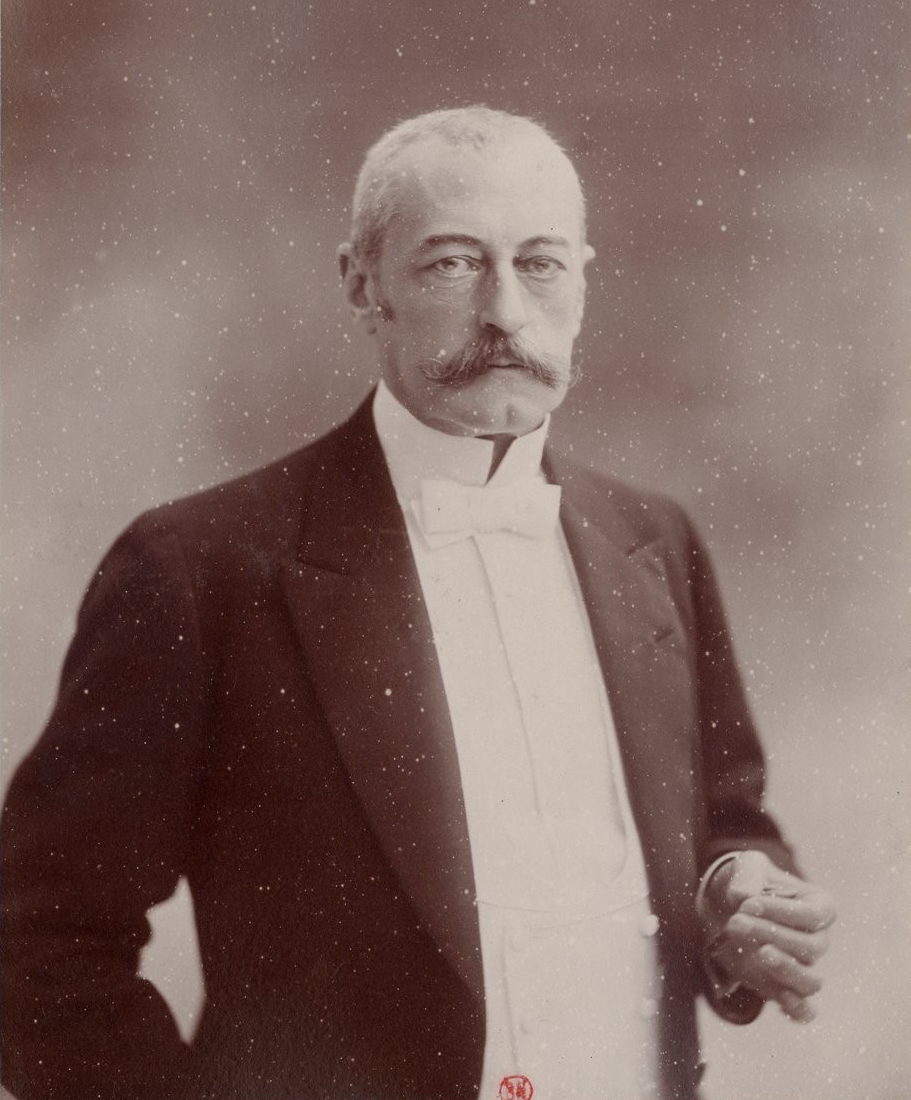
Pierre Waldeck-Rousseau

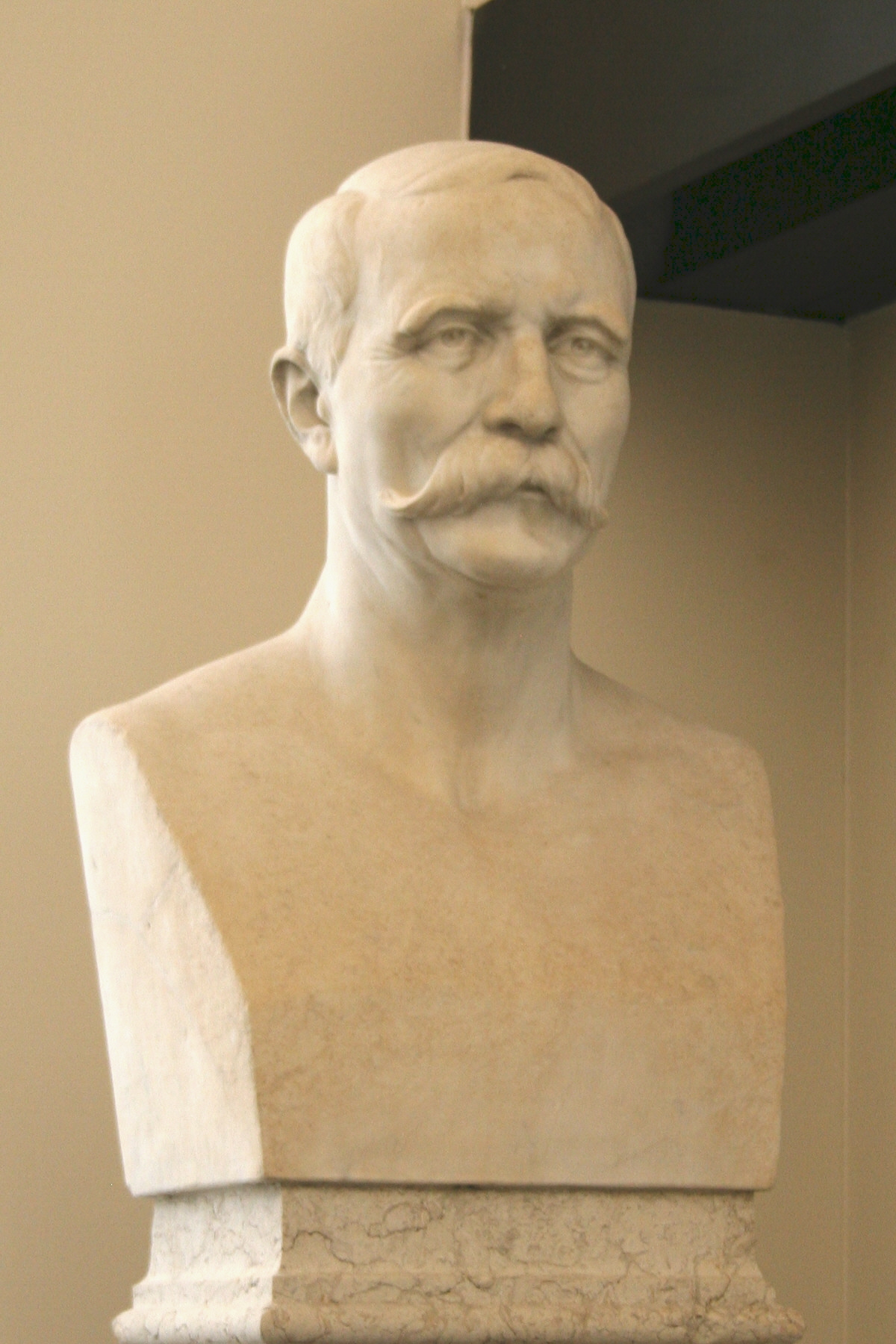
Gaudensi Allar

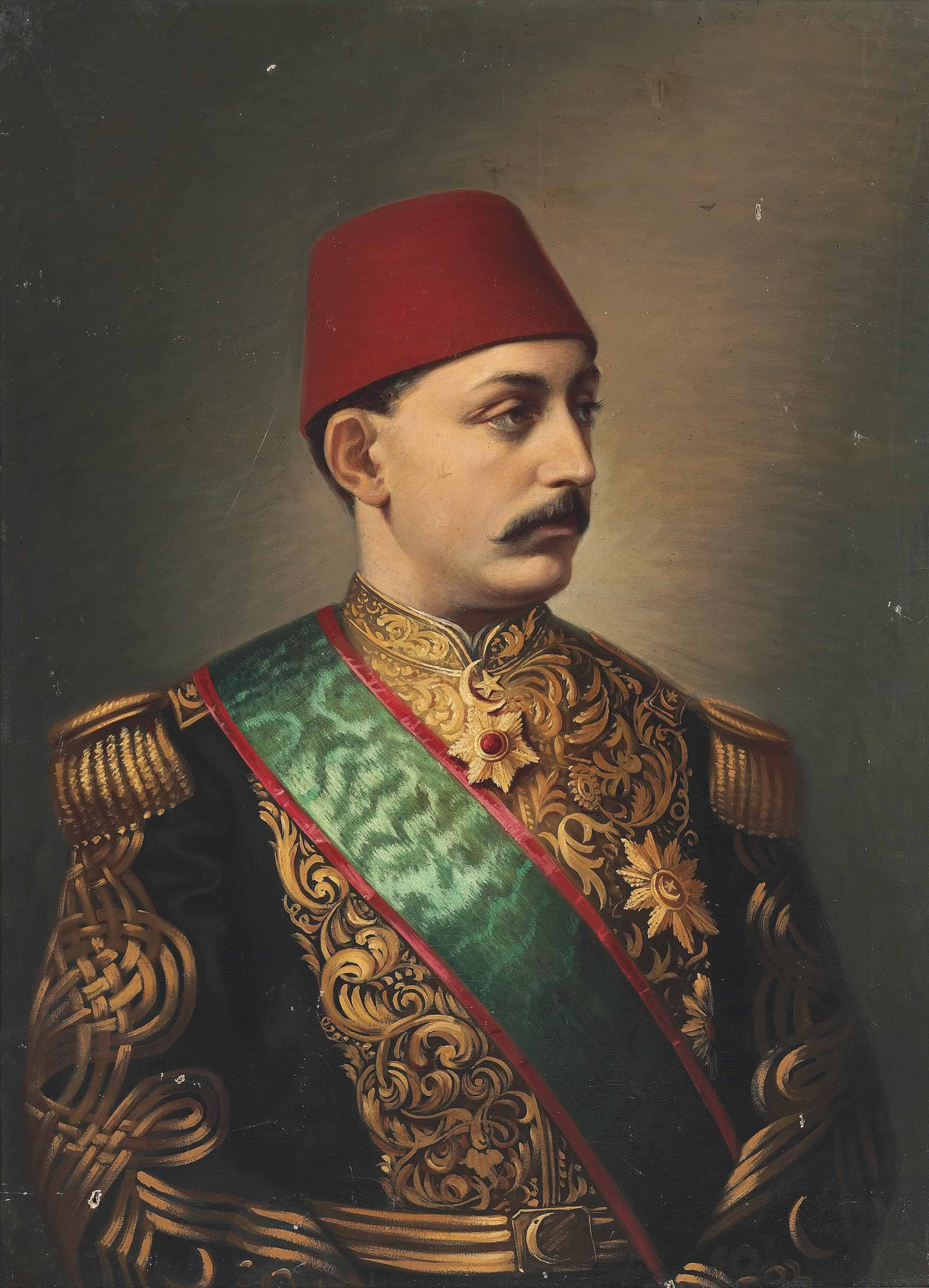
Sultan Murad V

- August 3 – Ernst Jedliczka, Russian-born German pianist (born 1855)
- August 6 – Eduard Hanslick, Austrian music critic (born 1825)
- August 8 – John Innes, British philanthropist (born 1828)
- August 9
  - Joseph David Everett, English physicist (born 1831)
  - Friedrich Ratzel, German geographer and ethnographer (born 1844)
- August 10
  - Wilgelm Vitgeft, Russian admiral (killed in action) (born 1847)
  - Pierre Waldeck-Rousseau, French politician, 29th Prime Minister of France (born 1846)
- August 12
  - Kawamura Sumiyoshi, Japanese admiral (born 1836)
  - William Renshaw, British tennis player (born 1861)
- August 13 – Elizabeth Wellesley, Duchess of Wellington (born 1820)
- August 14 – Eduard von Martens, German zoologist (born 1831)
- August 15 – John Henry Kinkead, American businessman and politician, 1st Governor of Alaska and 3rd Governor of Nevada (born 1826)
- August 16
  - Joachim Grassi, Italian architect (born 1837)
  - Prentiss Ingraham, American author of dime fiction (born 1843)
- August 21 – Gaudensi Allar, French architect (born 1841)
- August 22 – Kate Chopin, American author (born 1850)
- August 25 – Henri Fantin-Latour, French painter (born 1836)
- August 29 – Ottoman Sultan Murad V (born 1840)

=== September ===
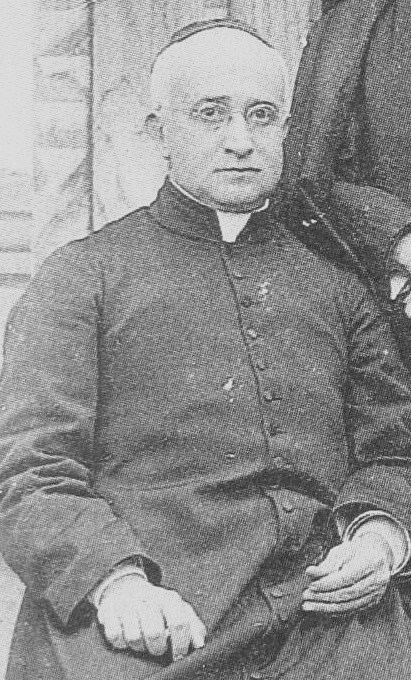
Saint José Maria de Yermo y Parres

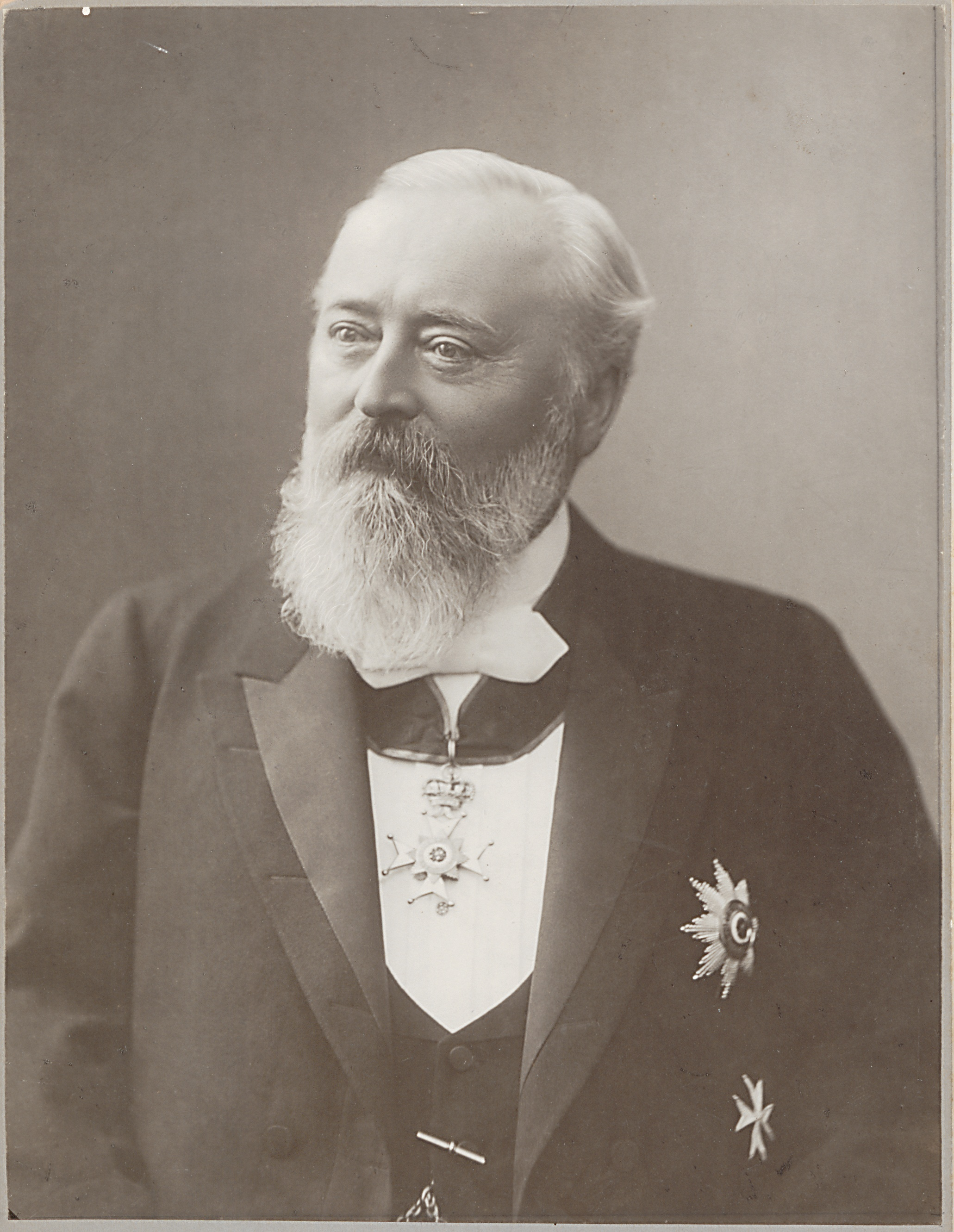
Ernest, Count of Lippe-Biesterfeld

- September 2
  - James Brady, American criminal (born 1875)
  - Elizabeth Fairburn Colenso, New Zealander Protestant missionary (born 1821)
- September 3
  - James Archer, Scottish artist (born 1822)
  - Heinrich Koebner, German-born Israeli dermatologist (born 1838)
- September 4 – William McCallin, 34th Mayor of Pittsburgh (born 1842)
- September 5 – Herbert von Bismarck, German politician (born 1849)
- September 13 – James Jameson, British Army surgeon (born 1837)
- September 17 – Kartini, Indonesian national heroine, women's rights activist (born 1879)
- September 20
  - R. W. H. T. Hudson, British mathematician (born 1876)
  - José Maria de Yermo y Parres, Mexican Roman Catholic priest and saint (born 1851)
- September 22 – Louis Massebieau, French historian and Protestant theologian (born 1840)
- September 23
  - George Adams, Australian businessman (born 1839)
  - Émile Gallé, French artist (born 1846)
- September 24
  - Niels Ryberg Finsen, Icelandic/Faroese/Danish physician and scientist (born 1860)
  - Gustav Frank, German-born Austrian Protestant theologian (born 1832)
  - Caleb C. Harris, American farmer and physician (born 1836)
- September 26
  - Ernest, Count of Lippe-Biesterfeld (born 1842)
  - Lafcadio Hearn, Greek-Irish Japanese author (born 1850)
- September 27 – David Grant Colson, American politician, U.S. Representative from Kentucky (born 1861)

=== October ===
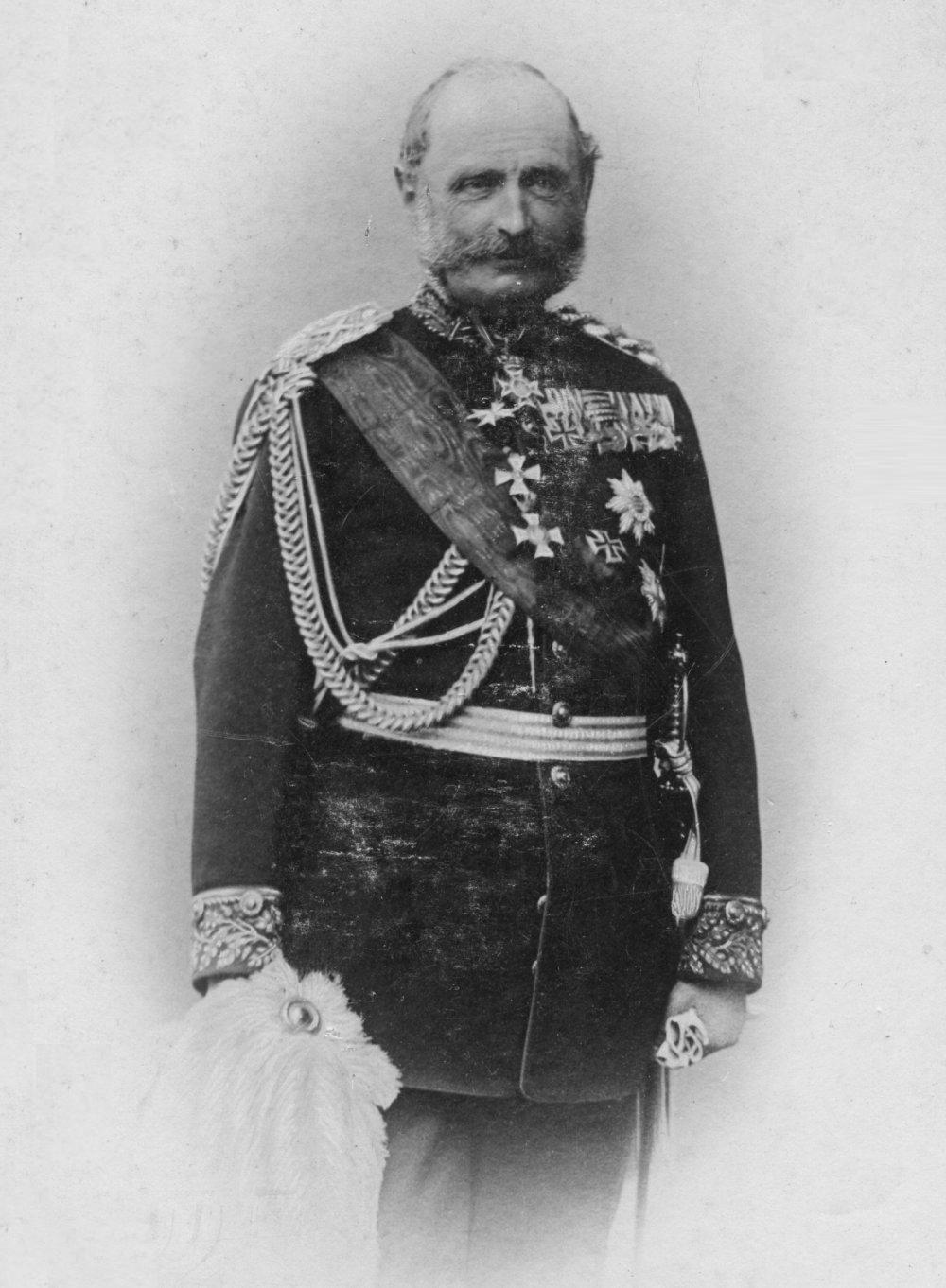
George, King of Saxony

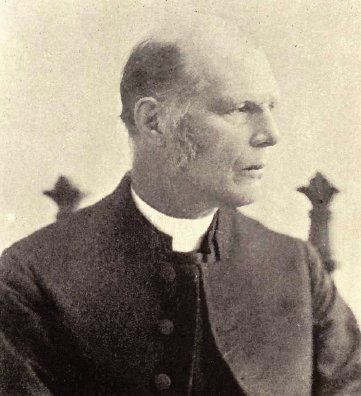
Maurice Baldwin

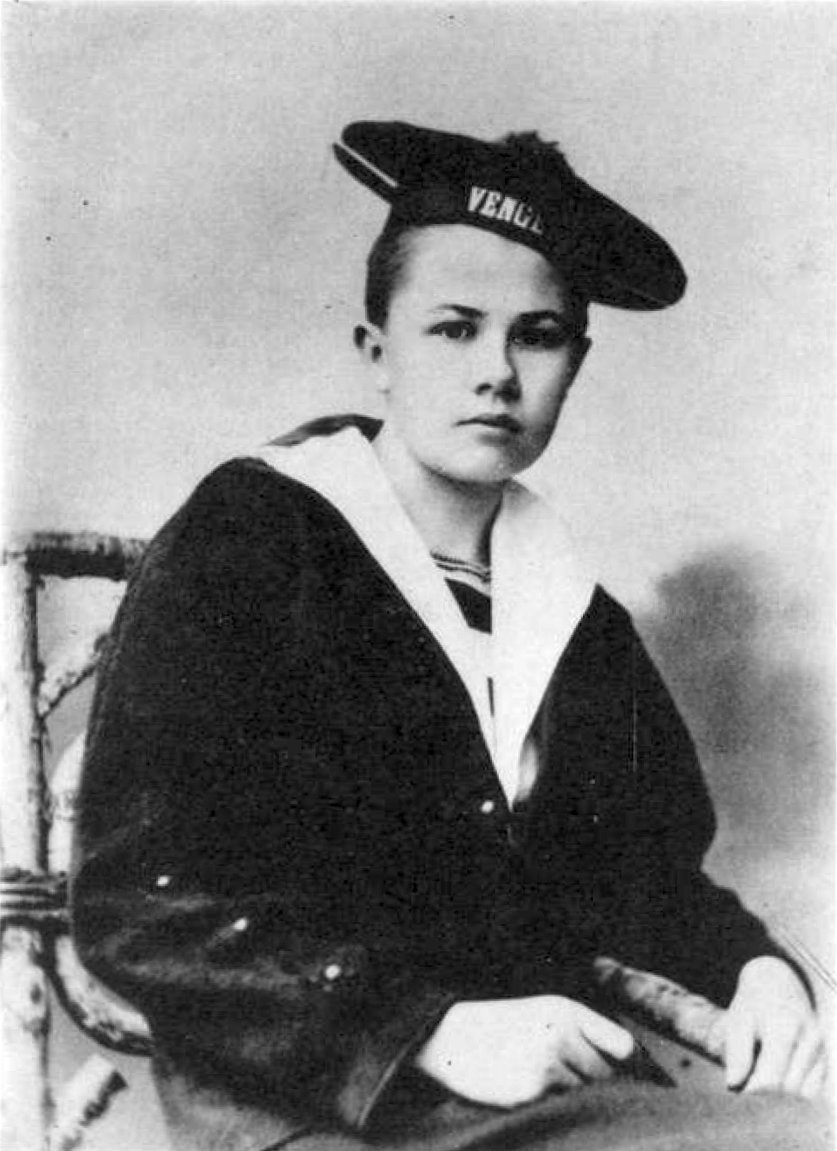
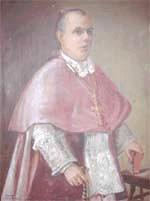
Isabelle Eberhardt and Braulio Orue-Vivanco died on October 21, 1904
- October 4
  - Frédéric Bartholdi, French sculptor (born 1834)
  - Carl Josef Bayer, Austrian chemist (born 1847)
  - Edmund Francis Dunne, American politician, jurist and Catholic orator (born 1835)
  - Violet Nicolson, British poet (born 1865)
  - Pierre Sainsevain, French settler (born 1818)
- October 8 – Gustav Ratzenhofer, Austrian philosopher (born 1842)
- October 11
  - Mary Tenney Gray, American club-woman
  - Archie Hooper, Canadian ice hockey player (born 1881)
- October 13 – Pavlos Melas, Greek revolutionary and army officer (born 1870)
- October 15 – George, King of Saxony (born 1832)
- October 17
  - Mercedes, Princess of Asturias (born 1880)
  - Ștefan Petică, Romanian poet and writer (born 1877)
- October 19 – Maurice Baldwin, Canadian Anglican bishop (born 1836)
- October 21
  - Euphemia Vale Blake, British-born American critic (born 1817)
  - Isabelle Eberhardt, Swiss explorer (born 1877)
  - Braulio Orue-Vivanco, Cuban Roman Catholic bishop (born 1843)
- October 23 – Emilia Dilke, English author (born 1840)
- October 26 – Princess Srivilailaksana of Suphanburi, daughter of King Rama V and Pae Bunnag (born 1868)

=== November ===
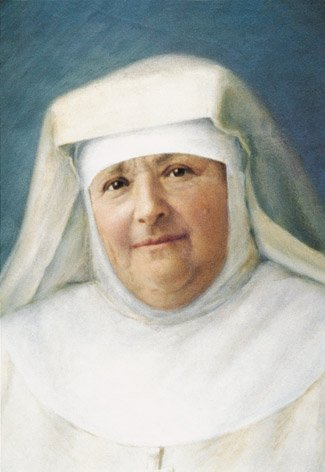
Blessed Mary of the Passion

- November 2 – Henry Austin, American baseball player (born 1844)
- November 3 – Carl Daniel Ekman, Swedish engineer (born 1845)
- November 7 – Guillermo Blest Gana, Chilean writer (born 1829)
- November 9 – Joseph C. Hendrix, U.S. Representative from New York (born 1853)
- November 10
  - Augustus Brandegee, American lawyer and politician, U.S. House of Representatives from Connecticut (born 1828)
  - Oreste Recchione, Italian painter (born 1841)
- November 12
  - Daniel Read Anthony, American publisher and abolitionist (born 1824)
  - Eliza Ann Otis, American poet, newspaper publisher, philanthropist (born 1833)
  - Georges Rohault de Fleury, French archaeologist (born 1835)
- November 14
  - John Murray Mitchell, British missionary (born 1815)
  - Mario Mocenni, Italian Roman Catholic cardinal (born 1823)
  - Isadore Rush, American actress (born 1866)
- November 15 – Mary of the Passion, French Roman Catholic religious sister, missionary and blessed (born 1839)
- November 16 – Clara Conway, American teacher (born 1844)
- November 18 – Justus van Maurik, Dutch author (born 1846)
- November 19 – Ednah Dow Littlehale Cheney, American writer, reformer, philanthropist (born 1824)
- November 27
  - Annie Chambers Ketchum (religious name, Sister Amabilis), American school founder (born 1824)
  - Paul Tannery, French mathematician (born 1843)
- November 28 – Fanny Janauschek, Czech actress (born 1829)
- November 29 – Helen Abbott Michael, American scientist (born 1857)

Day unknown:

- Charles D. F. Phillips, British medical doctor (born 1830)

=== December ===
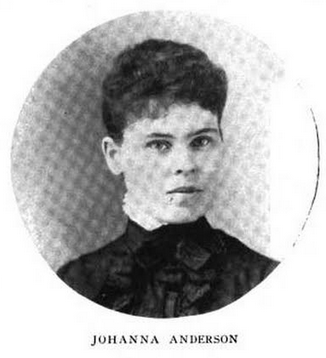
Johanna Anderson

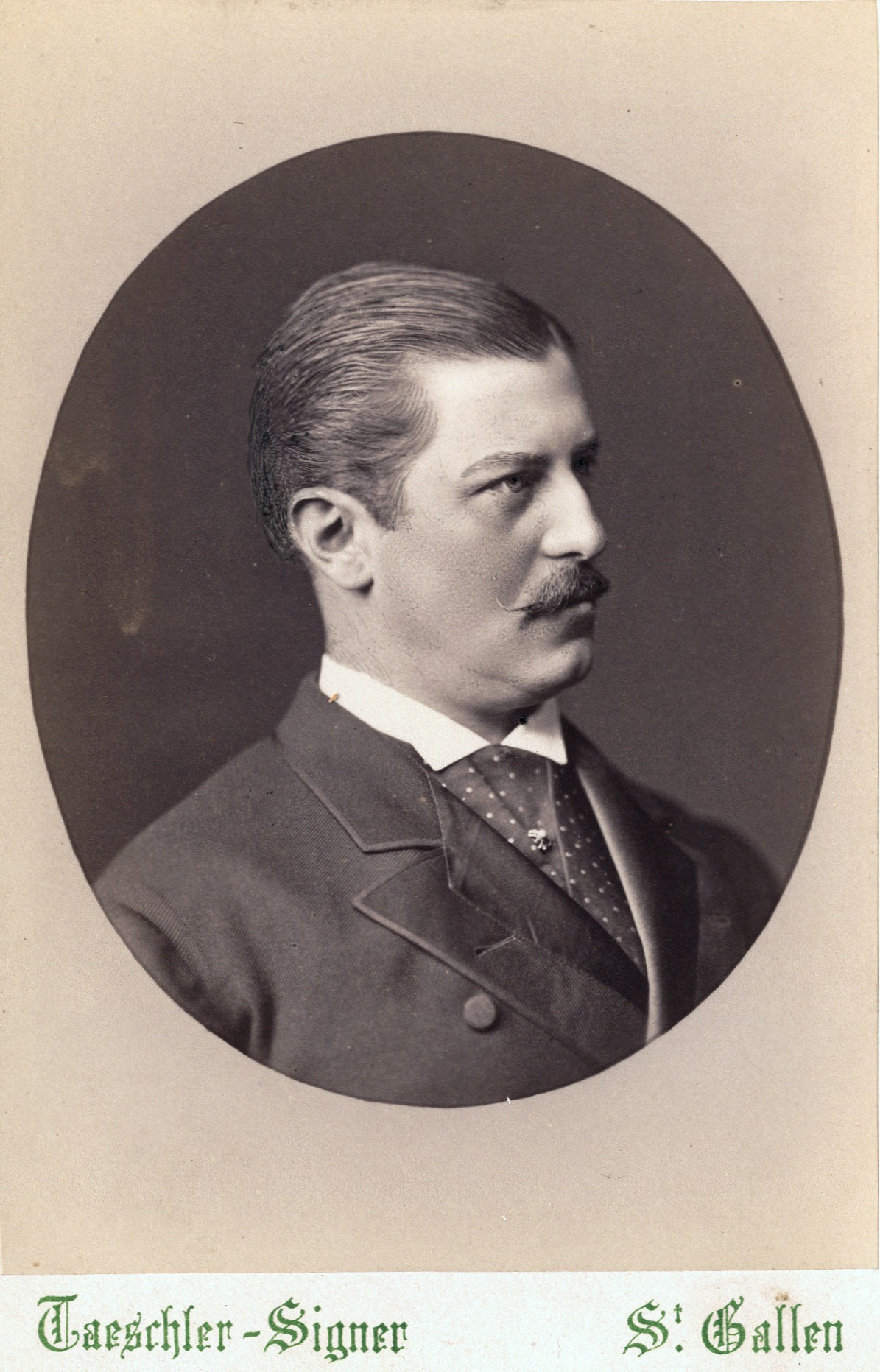
Prince Frederick of Hohenzollern-Sigmaringen

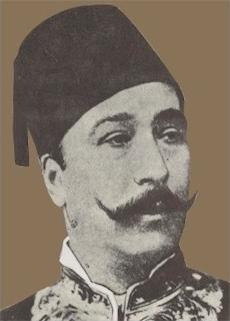
Mahmoud Samy El Baroudy

- December 1
  - Johanna Anderson, Swedish Baptist missionary (born 1856)
  - Hector Giacomelli, French artist (born 1822)
- December 2
  - Enrico Carfagnini, Italian Roman Catholic friar and bishop (born 1823)
  - Prince Frederick of Hohenzollern-Sigmaringen (born 1843)
- December 4 – Cristiano Banti, Italian painter (born 1824)
- December 8 – John Kirkpatrick, British-born Australian politician (born 1840)
- December 11
  - Spencer Charrington, English brewer and politician (born 1818)
  - Mahmoud Samy El Baroudy, Egyptian political figure, 5th Prime Minister of Egypt (born 1839)
- December 13
  - Bob Murphy, American baseball player (born 1866)
  - Nikolay Sklifosovsky, Russian surgeon (born 1836)
  - Henry Freeman, English fisherman and lifeboatmen (born 1835)
- December 14 – Mélanie Calvat, French Roman Catholic nun, Marian visionary and saint (born 1831)
- December 15 – Roman Kondratenko, Russian general (born 1857)
- December 16 – Daniel W. Mills, U.S. Representative from Illinois (born 1838)
- December 19 – Lewis Tappan Barney, American army officer (born 1844)
- December 20 – Princess Alexandrine of Baden (born 1820)
- December 21 – Edward H. Dewey, American physician (born 1837)
- December 22 – Horace Sumner Lyman, American journalist (born 1855)
- December 24 – Gustav Bauernfeind, German painter (born 1848)
- December 25 – Guido Bodländer, German chemist (born 1855)
- December 27 – William F. Mahoney, U.S. Representative from Illinois (born 1856)
- December 29 – Friedrich Moritz Brauer, German entomologist (born 1832)
- December 30 – Frederick Clifford, English journalist (born 1828)

== Nobel Prizes ==

- Physics – The Lord Rayleigh
- Chemistry – Sir William Ramsay
- Physiology or Medicine – Ivan Petrovich Pavlov
- Literature – Frédéric Mistral and José Echegaray
- Peace – Institut de Droit International
