= April 1904 =

Month of 1904

<<	April 1904					>>
Su	Mo	Tu	We	Th	Fr	Sa
					1	2
3	4	5	6	7	8	9
10	11	12	13	14	15	16
17	18	19	20	21	22	23
24	25	26	27	28	29	30

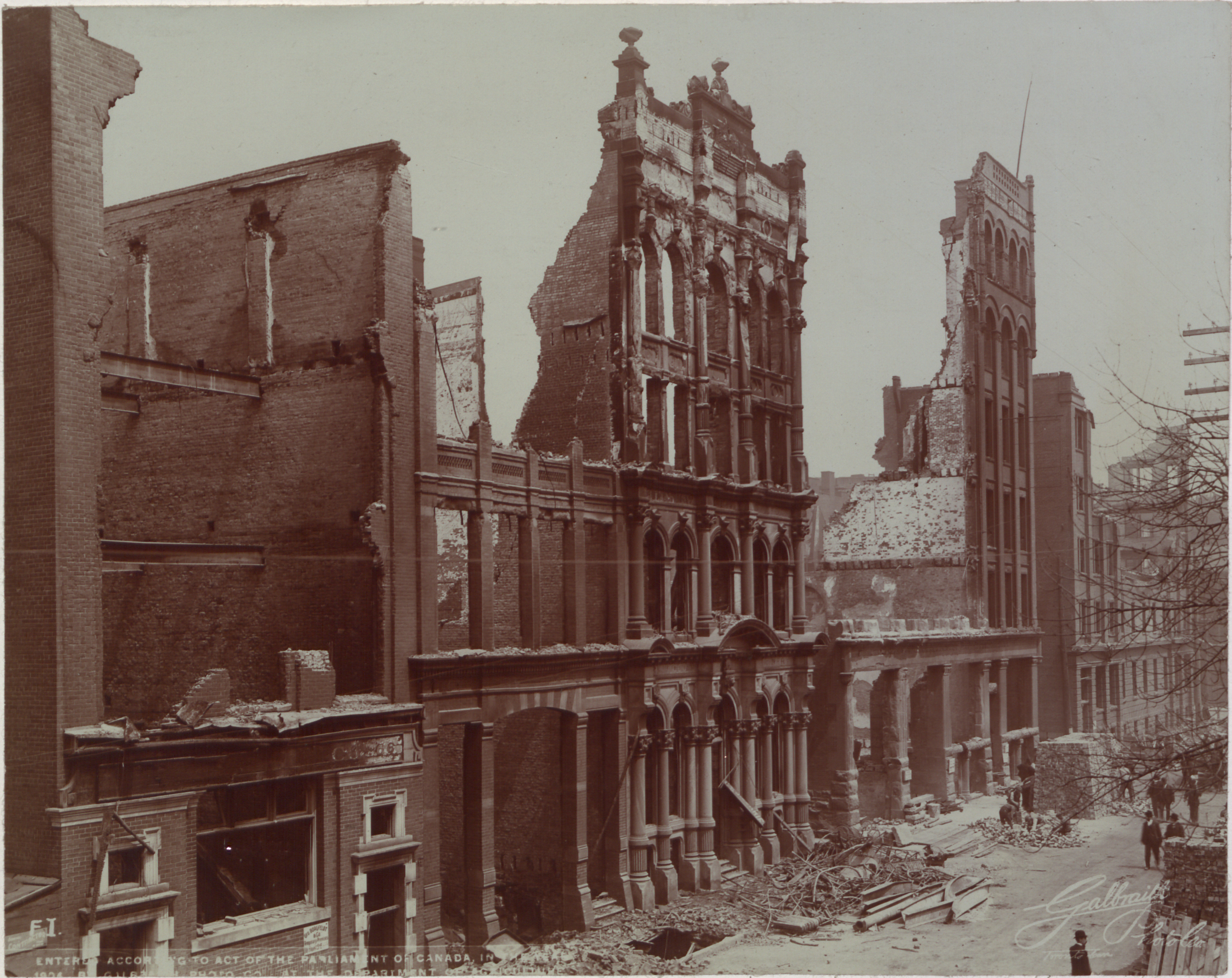
Aftermath of the Great Fire of Toronto (1904)

The following events occurred in April 1904:

== April 1, 1904 (Friday) ==
- The research vessel RRS Discovery arrived in Lyttelton, New Zealand, from the Discovery Expedition to Antarctica, accompanied by the relief ships SY Morning and Terra Nova.
- A fire in the central business district of Montreal caused $100,000 in damage.
- Born:
  - Nikolai Berzarin, Soviet general; in Saint Petersburg, Russian Empire (d. 1945, motorcycle accident)
  - Holger Löwenadler, Swedish film actor; in Jönköping, Sweden (d. 1977)
  - Émile Turlant, French centenarian; in Moulins-sur-Allier, France (d. 2013)
- Died:
  - Otto von Böhtlingk, 88, Russian-German Indologist and Sanskrit scholar
  - Guy Wetmore Carryl, 31, American humorist and poet, died from the aftereffects of exposure that occurred while fighting a fire at his house.
  - Abby Morton Diaz, 82, American teacher

== April 2, 1904 (Saturday) ==
- New York City reported 31 deaths from acute cerebrospinal meningitis for the week ending April 2.
- Born:
  - Karl Ragnar Gierow, Swedish theater director, author and translator; in Helsingborg, Sweden (d. 1982)
  - František Hochmann, Czechoslovak Olympic and professional footballer; in Prague, Austria-Hungary (d. 1986)
- Died: Charles Jones, 50, English cricketer

== April 3, 1904 (Sunday) ==
- On Easter Sunday, Pope Pius X sent his apostolic blessing to the Diocese of Venice by telephone, the first time a Pope had sent such a blessing by phone in the history of the Catholic Church.
- Gabriel Voisin successfully flew an Archdeacon glider at Berck sur Mer, Picardy, France. 9-year-old Jacques Henri Lartigue, who would later become a well-known photographer, witnessed Voisin's flight.
- In Albia, Iowa, an explosion at the Citizens' National Bank killed three people.
- Born:
  - Iron Eyes Cody (born Espera Oscar de Corti), American actor of Italian descent who falsely claimed Native American ancestry; in Kaplan, Louisiana (d. 1999)
  - Sally Rand (born Helen Gould Beck), American dancer and actress; in Elkton, Missouri (d. 1979, congestive heart failure)
  - Sante Tani, Italian soldier and partisan; in Rigutino, Arezzo, Italy (d. 1944, murdered)
  - Maria Wiłkomirska, Polish pianist; in Moscow, Russia (d. 1995)
  - Russel Wright, American industrial designer; in Lebanon, Ohio (d. 1976)
- Died:
  - Ernest Monnington Bowden, 44, Irish inventor
  - Princess Edward of Saxe-Weimar, 77, died of acute pneumonia.
  - William Justice Ford, 50, English schoolmaster, cricketer and sportswriter, died of pneumonia.

== April 4, 1904 (Monday) ==
- Two earthquakes struck near Kresna, Bulgaria, killing at least 200 people.
- Hundreds of children, including the young children of U.S. President Theodore Roosevelt, took part in an Easter Monday egg roll on the grounds of the White House in Washington, D.C.
- Born:
  - Alexander Afinogenov, Soviet playwright; in Skopin, Russian Empire (d. 1941, German air raid)
  - Walter J. Kohler Jr., American politician, Governor of Wisconsin; in Kohler, Wisconsin (d. 1976, myocardial infarction)
  - Käthe von Nagy (born Ekaterina Nagy von Cziser), Hungarian actress and singer; in Subotica, Kingdom of Hungary, Austria-Hungary (d. 1973, cancer)
  - Soeman Hs, Indonesian author and educator; in Bengkalis, Riau (d. 1999)

== April 5, 1904 (Tuesday) ==
- Born:
  - Richard Eberhart, American poet; in Austin, Minnesota (d. 2005)
  - Wool Winder, British-bred Thoroughbred racehorse; in Exning, England (d. 1928, intestinal infection)
- Died:
  - Emmy Braun (pseudonym for Ida Louise Jacob), 77, German cookbook author
  - Frances Power Cobbe, 81, Anglo-Irish writer, philosopher and activist
  - Ernst, Prince of Leiningen, 73, Royal Navy officer

== April 6, 1904 (Wednesday) ==
- In York, Pennsylvania, Vigilant Fire Company firefighters John Henry Saltzgiver, Horace Frank Strine and Lewis M. Strubringer were killed by collapsing walls while fighting a fire at the York Carriage Works.
- Joseph F. Smith announced the Second Manifesto in General Conference of the Church of Jesus Christ of Latter-day Saints, ending in fact the practice of plural marriage, which had continued to be practiced by many of its leaders, in violation of the 1890 Manifesto officially banning the practice.
- In Quebec, Canada, boxer Louis Drolet was knocked out in the 16th round of a bout with George Wagner. Drolet would die of his injuries the following day.
- Born:
  - William Challee, American actor; in Chicago, Illinois (d. 1989)
  - Georges Gautschi, Swiss Olympic figure skater (d. 1985)
  - Kurt Georg Kiesinger, Chancellor of West Germany; in Ebingen, Kingdom of Württemberg, German Empire (d. 1988)
  - Erwin Komenda, Austrian automobile designer; in Jauern am Semmering, Austria (d. 1966, lung cancer)
  - Vasili Merkuryev, Soviet actor and stage director; in Ostrov, Ostrovsky District, Pskov Oblast, Russian Empire (d. 1978)
  - Henri Vilbert (born Miquely Henri Marcel Louis), French actor; in Marseille, France (d. 1997)

== April 7, 1904 (Thursday) ==
- Born:
  - Charles Bardot, French Olympic footballer; in Clauzel, Algeria (year of death unknown)
  - Curt Querner, German painter; in Börnchen (now part of Bannewitz), Saxony, German Empire (d. 1976)
  - Roland Wilson, Australian economist and statistician; in Ulverstone, Tasmania, Australia (d. 1996)
- Died: Timothy J. Campbell, 64, Irish-born American lawyer and politician, member of the United States House of Representatives from New York

== April 8, 1904 (Friday) ==
- The Convention of Istanbul, signed by a number of powers including Germany in 1888, came into force.
- In Sebastopol, a suburb of Pittston, Pennsylvania, four children burned to death in a 1 a.m. fire.
- The French Third Republic and the United Kingdom of Great Britain and Ireland signed the Entente Cordiale.
- In Cairo, Egypt, Aleister Crowley began writing Liber Al vel Legis, better known as The Book of the Law, a text central to Thelema. He would complete the work on April 10.
- Longacre Square in Midtown Manhattan was renamed Times Square, after The New York Times.
- High winds in St. Louis, Missouri, destroyed the partly built bazaar building in the Japanese exhibit on the Louisiana Purchase Exposition grounds. There were no injuries and no damage to other buildings.
- Grievance committees from the engine houses of the Los Angeles Fire Department met with the city's fire commissioners to inform them that white firefighters were unwilling for two newly appointed African American firefighters, B. F. Anderson and Osborne Johnson, to be quartered at engine houses with white crews. White firefighters specifically objected to the possibility of having to sleep in the African American firefighters' bunks when temporarily assigned to their engine houses. Some grievance committee members suggested that quartering African Americans with white crews might lead to a strike and walkout.
- Born:
  - John Antill, Australian composer; in Ashfield, Sydney, New South Wales, Australia (d. 1986)
  - John Hicks, English economist, recipient of the Nobel Memorial Prize in Economic Sciences; in Warwick, England (d. 1989)
  - Hirsch Jacobs, American thoroughbred horse trainer; in Manhattan, New York City (d. 1970, cerebral hemorrhage)
  - Alfei Jürgenson, Estonian Olympic footballer; in Tallinn, Estonia (d. 1947)
  - Karl Scherm, German international footballer; in Nuremberg, Germany (d. 1977)
  - Piet Vermeylen, Belgian lawyer and politician; in Uccle, Brussels, Belgium (d. 1991)
  - Georg Werner, Swedish Olympic freestyle swimmer; in Stockholm, Sweden (d. 2002)

== April 9, 1904 (Saturday) ==
- Born:
  - Alma Bennett (born Alma Long), American silent film actress; in Seattle, Washington (d. 1958)
  - Albino Binda, Italian racing cyclist; in Cittiglio, Lombardy, Italy (d. 1976)
  - Sharkey Bonano, American jazz musician; in Milneburg, Louisiana (d. 1972)
  - Tom Cooper, England international footballer; in Fenton, Stoke-on-Trent, England (d. 1940, Royal Military Police motorcycle accident)
  - Ludwig Hohl, German-language Swiss author; in Netstal, Switzerland (d. 1980, leg inflammation)
  - Sisowath Kossamak, queen consort of Cambodia; in Phnom Penh, Cambodia, French Indochina (d. 1975)
  - Vittorio Staccione, Italian association football midfielder and anti-fascist; in Turin, Kingdom of Italy (d. 1945, sepsis and gangrene at Mauthausen concentration camp)
  - Paul Wessel, Socialist Unity Party of Germany politician; in Plauen, Germany (d. 1967)
- Died:
  - Edward White Clark, 76, American financier
  - Queen Isabella II of Spain, 73, aftereffects of respiratory illness

== April 10, 1904 (Sunday) ==
- In California, county game warden W. B. Morgan returned from an investigatory trip to the Antelope Valley and reported to the fish and game commission that the rumors of a "river of death" in the Mojave Desert were true. A stream of water polluted with cyanide, originating at the cyanide plant of the Exposed Treasure mine, ran through the desert for 4.5 miles (7.2 km) before sinking into the earth. The reservoir in which the water was formerly impounded had filled up with silt. Morgan saw the corpses of steers as well as doves, larks and other birds, all of which had been poisoned by the water. Morgan recommended that warning notices be placed along the entire length of the river and that the mining company be forced to build a new, adequate reservoir. In the following day's edition, the Los Angeles Herald would comment, "Probably in no other section of the United States does a like condition prevail, nor would it be allowed to exist."
- In Philadelphia, a student walking past Houston Hall at the University of Pennsylvania heard groans and discovered John Thomas, the building's 69-year-old night watchman, lying mortally wounded across one of the bowling alleys in the basement. Lawrence Gibson (a.k.a. John Oakley), a black West Indian who was formerly a utility man at Houston Hall, would be arrested for the murder on April 11. He initially denied killing Thomas, but admitted to the crime later in the day, claiming self-defense. Gibson had recently lost his job at Houston Hall after claiming to be a student at the university and marrying a white woman.
- Born:
  - Scott Forbush, American astronomer, physicist and geophysicist; in Hudson, Ohio (d. 1984, pneumonia)
  - Joachim Gottschalk, German stage and film actor; in Calau, Germany (d. 1941, suicide by gas poisoning)
  - Nino Pavese, Italian actor and voice actor; in Asti, Italy (d. 1979)

== April 11, 1904 (Monday) ==
- While professional diver William Hoar was attempting to close an intake pipe in the new Jersey City Reservoir in Boonton, New Jersey, the suction of the water caught Hoar's left leg between the pipe and the nearly 5,000-pound (2,300 kg) ball closing it. Despite extensive rescue efforts, Hoar would die after surviving 70 feet (21 m) underwater for 24 hours.
- The tugboat Frank Canfield ran aground and sank at Point Au Sable, Michigan. Captain Henry Smith, Engineer Kopfer and Helper William Justman were killed; the other two crewmembers escaped by life raft.
- The steamship Colon struck a rock at Remedios Reef, El Salvador, and was then beached at Acajutla, where the passengers were taken off. The ship was a total loss; there were no fatalities. The Colon was commanded by Captain William A. Irvine, whose license would be suspended for one year on August 12 for unskillfulness and negligence.
- Born:
  - Joseph Beecken, Belgian Olympic boxer (possibly born on May 7, 1904; d. 1948)
  - Philip Hall, English mathematician; in Hampstead, London, England (d. 1982)
  - Paul McGrath, American actor; in Chicago, Illinois (d. 1978)
  - Pierre Reuter, Luxembourgian Olympic footballer (d. 1969)
  - K. L. Saigal, Indian singer and actor; in Nawashehr, Jammu, Jammu and Kashmir, British Raj (d. 1947, alcoholism)
- Died: Shorty Fuller (born William Benjamin Fuller), 36, American Major League Baseball shortstop

== April 12, 1904 (Tuesday) ==
- In response to repeated allegations that former U.S. President Grover Cleveland had dined with the late African American politician C. H. J. Taylor, Representative Charles Lafayette Bartlett of Georgia read a letter from Cleveland in the U.S. House of Representatives in which Cleveland stated, "It so happened that I have never in my official position either when sleeping or waking, alive or dead, on my head or on my heels, dined, lunched or supped or invited to a wedding reception any colored man, woman or child. If, however, I had decided to do any of these things, neither the fear of Mr. Thomas E. Watson or any one else would have prevented me."
- William G. Thompson, the former Mayor of Detroit, was struck by a bicycle. He would die of his injuries on July 20.
- A battalion of Filipino scouts departed San Francisco, California, by train for St. Louis, where they would appear at the Louisiana Purchase Exposition.
- Born:
  - Vladimir Chestnokov, Soviet stage and film actor; in Saint Petersburg, Russian Empire (d. 1968)
  - Paul Dahlke, German stage and film actor; in Groß Streitz, Province of Pomerania, German Empire (d. 1984)
  - David Jenkins, Welsh dual-code international rugby footballer; in Resolven, Wales (d. 1951)
  - Puccio Pucci, Italian lawyer, Olympic middle-distance runner and sports official; in Florence, Province of Florence, Italy (d. 1985)
  - Glen H. Taylor, American politician, member of the United States Senate from Idaho; in Portland, Oregon (d. 1984)
- Died:
  - Elizaveta Akhmatova (aka Leila), 83, Russian translator
  - W. H. Browne, 57, English-born Australian gold miner, member of the Legislative Assembly of Queensland, died of pneumonia and angina pectoris.
  - Carl Day, 28, American politician, member of the Kentucky House of Representatives, died of inflammatory rheumatism and pneumonia.
  - Jeneverah M. Winton (née Pray), 66, American poet and author

== April 13, 1904 (Wednesday) ==
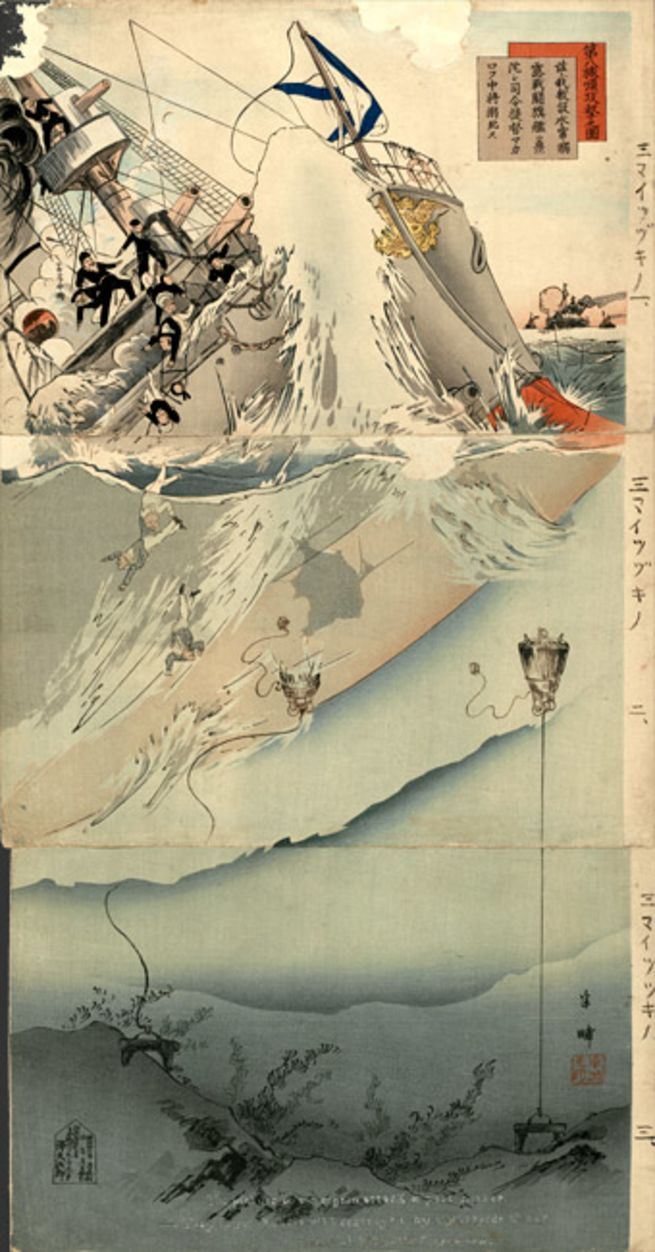
Sinking of the Petropavlovsk as depicted by Japanese artist Yasuda Hampō

- After driving off a group of Japanese warships, the Russian battleship Petropavlovsk was sunk by a Japanese naval mine off Port Arthur, killing its commander, Admiral Stepan Makarov, and over 600 other officers and men. Grand Duke Kirill Vladimirovich of Russia survived the sinking.
- Six Japanese torpedo boats sank the Russian torpedo boat destroyer Strashniy off the Elliot Islands, killing 45 officers and men.
- During target practice aboard the battleship USS Missouri (BB-11) off the Virginia Capes, a flareback from the port gun in the ship's after-turret ignited a powder charge and set off two others. No explosion occurred but the rapid burning of the powder suffocated 36 of the crew. Prompt action prevented the loss of the Missouri. Three of the ship's crew would subsequently be awarded Medals of Honor for extraordinary heroism.
- Born:
  - Yves Congar, French Dominican priest and theologian, Roman Catholic cardinal; in Sedan, Ardennes, France (d. 1995)
  - Leone N. Farrell, Canadian biochemist and microbiologist; in Monkland, Ontario, Canada (d. 1986, lung cancer)
  - Fernando Lopez, Filipino statesman, Vice President of the Philippines; in Jaro, Iloilo City, Iloilo, Philippine Islands (d. 1993)
  - Elwood Richard Quesada, United States Air Force general; in Washington, D.C. (d. 1993)
  - David Robinson, English businessman and philanthropist; in Cambridge, England (d. 1987)
- Died:
  - J. V. P. Gridley, United States Marine Corps lieutenant, son of Captain Charles Vernon Gridley, was killed in the Missouri disaster.
  - Stepan Makarov, 55, Russian admiral, was killed in the sinking of the Petropavlovsk.
  - William Edward Taylor Neumann, 22, United States Naval Academy midshipman and son of Paul Neumann, former attorney general of the Hawaiian Kingdom, was killed in the Missouri disaster.
  - Saitō Ryokuu (pen name of Saitō Masaru), 36, Japanese author and critic, died of tuberculosis.
  - Titus Sheard, 62, American businessman and politician, member of the New York State Senate, died of heart disease.
  - Julian Sturgis, 55, American-born British author
  - Vasily Vereshchagin, 61, Russian war artist, was killed in the sinking of the Petropavlovsk.
  - David P. Wheeler, 27, United States Army captain, was killed in action in the Moro Rebellion.

== April 14, 1904 (Thursday) ==
- A fire which broke out at 10 p.m. destroyed all but one building at the Deoksugung imperial palace in Seoul, Korea.
- U.S. President Roosevelt's sons Theodore Roosevelt Jr. and Kermit Roosevelt returned to Washington, D.C., from school in Groton, Massachusetts, suffering from mumps. They were isolated in the White House pending their recovery.
- Future journalist and newspaper editor Cissy Patterson married Russian Count Josef Gizycki at the Patterson family home in Washington, D.C. The couple would later divorce.
- Born:
  - Gerhard Adler, German analytical psychologist; in Berlin, Germany (d. 1988)
  - Federico Gentile, Italian publisher; in Naples, Italy (d. 1996)
  - John Gielgud, English actor; in London, England (d. 2000)
  - Elizabeth Irving (born Dorothea Elizabeth Irving), British actress; in London, England (d. 2003)
- Died:
  - Samuel Andrews, 67–68, English-born American chemist and inventor, died of pneumonia.
  - Michelangelo Celesia, 90, Italian Benedictine monk, Roman Catholic cardinal and Archbishop of Palermo

== April 15, 1904 (Friday) ==
- American industrialist and philanthropist Andrew Carnegie, inspired by the self-sacrifice of rescuers after the Harwick Mine disaster in January, established the Carnegie Hero Fund.
- At Huffman Prairie, Ohio, the Wright brothers finished building a shed for the Wright Flyer II, the new, stronger flying machine on which they were working.
- The U.S. Army transport Sheridan arrived in San Francisco from Manila via Nagasaki and Honolulu, carrying 300 members of the Philippine constabulary and police, as well as their band, to appear at the World's Fair in St. Louis.
- The World's Fair grounds closed to visitors until the formal opening of the fair on April 30.
- U.S. President Roosevelt arrived in New Castle, Colorado, by train for a bear hunting trip.
- Born:
  - Arshile Gorky (born Vosdanig Manoug Adoian), Armenian-born painter; in Khorkom, Van vilayet, Armenia, Ottoman Empire (possibly born in 1903) (d. 1948, suicide by hanging)
  - Antero Kivi, Finnish Olympic discus thrower; in Orivesi, Grand Duchy of Finland, Russian Empire (d. 1981)
  - Valentin Krempl, German Olympic bobsledder (d. 1944)
  - Giuseppe Lippi, Italian middle-distance runner and Olympic steeplechaser; in Florence, Province of Florence, Italy (d. 1978)
  - Harry Monty (born Hymie Liechtenstein), American actor and stunt performer; in Dallas, Texas (d. 1999)
- Died:
  - Filippo Costaggini, 64–65, Italian artist who worked in the United States Capitol
  - Elisha W. Edgerton, 88, American businessman and politician, member of the Wisconsin State Assembly
  - Maximilian Kronberger, 16, German poet, died of meningitis.

== April 16, 1904 (Saturday) ==
- In Svendborg, Denmark, Peter Mærsk Møller and his son Arnold Peter Møller founded Dampskibsselskabet Svendborg (The Steamship Company Svendborg). The company would eventually become Maersk, one of the world's largest freight transport companies.
- In an instance of the rivalry between the military of French West Africa and that of southern Algeria, in Timiaouine, Algeria, troops led by Captain Jean-Baptiste Théveniaut, acting under orders from Théveniaut's superiors, opposed the further southward progress of Colonel François-Henry Laperrine's troops, who were traveling toward Timbuktu.
- The German association football club FC Einigkeit Braunschweig (later named VfB Rot-Weiß 04 Braunschweig) was founded in Braunschweig, Lower Saxony.
- Born:
  - Alfonso Bedoya (born Benito Alfonso Bedoya y Díaz de Guzmán), Mexican actor; in Vícam, Sonora, Mexico (d. 1957)
  - Clifford P. Case, American lawyer and politician, member of the United States House of Representatives and the United States Senate from New Jersey; in Franklin Park, New Jersey (d. 1982)
  - Fifi D'Orsay (born Marie-Rose Angelina Yvonne Lussier), Canadian-born American actress; in Montreal, Quebec, Canada (d. 1983, cancer)
  - Jennison Heaton, American Olympic bobsled and champion skeleton racer; in New Haven, Connecticut (d. 1971)
  - Gordon Hodgson, South African-born English cricketer and footballer; in Johannesburg, South Africa (d. 1951, cancer)
  - Walter Walford Johnson, American businessman and politician, Governor of Colorado; in Pueblo, Colorado (d. 1987)
- Died:
  - Samuel Smiles, 91, Scottish-English author and government reformer
  - Andrew H. Ward, 89, American lawyer and banker, member of the United States House of Representatives from Kentucky

== April 17, 1904 (Sunday) ==
- George White was found murdered in a hops plantation in Wrecclesham, Surrey, England, at the age of 16. An 18-year-old suspect would be charged with White's murder but later discharged. The case remains unsolved.
- Bangu Atlético Clube was founded at the Fábrica Bangu in Rio de Janeiro.
- Born:
  - Joseph Ahrens, German composer and organist; in Sommersell (d. 1997)
  - Johann Blank, German Olympic champion water polo player; in Nuremberg, Bavaria, Germany (d. 1983)
  - Irene Manton (born Irène Manton), British cytologist and botanist; in Kensington, London, England (d. 1988)
- Died:
  - Joe Cain, 71, American Mardi Gras parade organizer
  - Henry W. Wheeler, 62, American Union Army soldier, Medal of Honor recipient

== April 18, 1904 (Monday) ==
- Czech composer Antonín Dvořák, ill since the previous month, developed influenza. He would die on May 1.

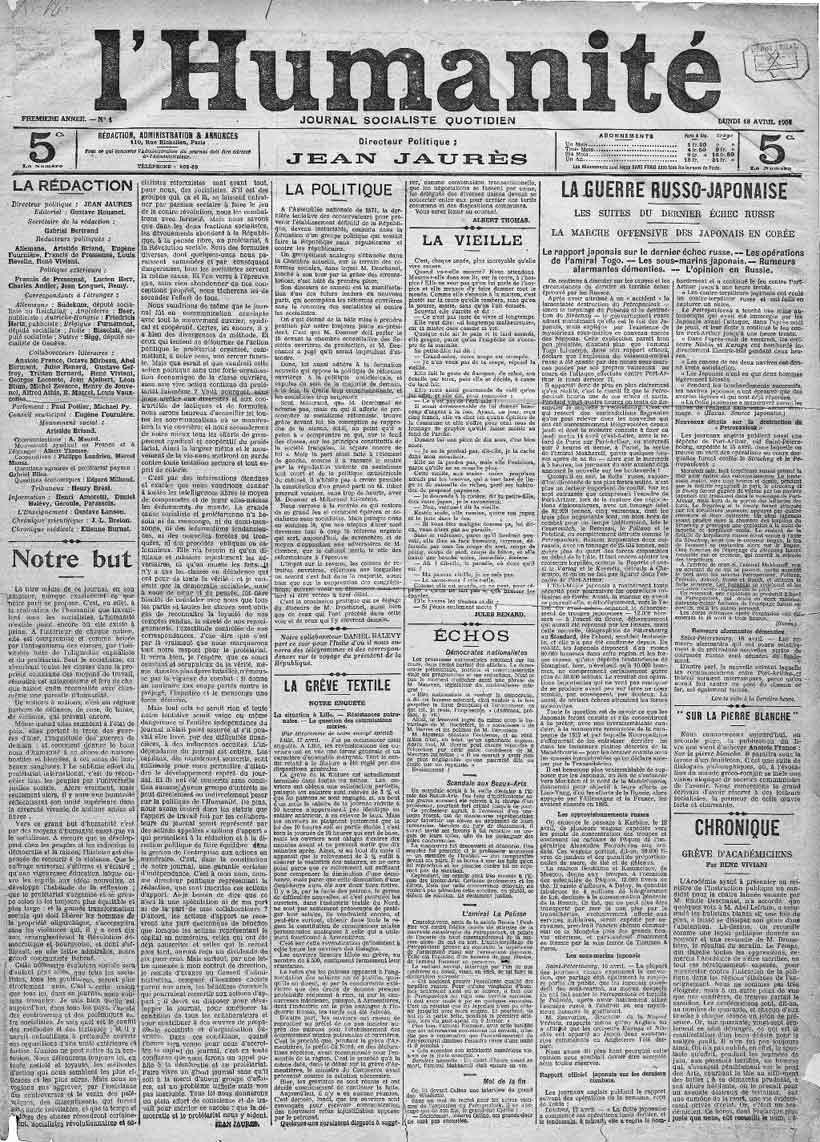
First edition of l'Humanité

- The French newspaper l'Humanité, founded by Jean Jaurès, published its first edition. The paper would long be associated with the French Communist Party (PCF).
- The Royal Navy submarine HMS A1, which had sunk with all hands on March 18 after being struck by SS Berwick Castle, was raised.
- Born:
  - Ballot, American Thoroughbred racehorse (d. 1937)
  - Pigmeat Markham (born Dewey Markham), American entertainer; in Durham, North Carolina (d. 1981, stroke)
  - Giuseppe Terragni, Italian Rationalist architect; in Meda, Lombardy, Italy (d. 1943, thrombosis)
- Died:
  - Sumner Paine, 35, American Olympic champion shooter, died of pneumonia.
  - Sir Henry Thompson, 1st Baronet, FRCS, 83, British surgeon and polymath
  - Charlie Ziegler, 29, American Major League Baseball infielder

== April 19, 1904 (Tuesday) ==
- A 2 a.m. avalanche killed 13 people in Muehlback, Switzerland.
- Eight people were killed and 35 or 40 injured in the derailment of a Mexican Central Railway passenger train about 4 kilometres (2.5 mi) north of Zacatecas City.
- The Great Fire of Toronto started before 8:00 p.m. and burned through the night. It destroyed much of Toronto's downtown, causing about $10 million in damage, but there were no fatalities.
- Born:
  - Constance Carpenter, English-born American film and musical theater actress; in Bath, Somerset, England (d. 1992)
  - Riccardo Hellmuth Seidl, Italian aviator and soldier; in Naples, Italy (d. 1941, killed in action)
  - Fred Tilson (born Samuel Frederick Tilson), English professional footballer; in Barnsley, West Riding of Yorkshire, England (d. 1972)
- Died:
  - Charlotte Blake Brown (born Charlotte Amanda Blake), 58, American physician, died after apoplexy and surgery.
  - Sir Clement le Neve Foster FRS, 63, English geologist and mineralogist

== April 20, 1904 (Wednesday) ==
- A coal dust explosion at a mine in Stearns, Kentucky, killed five African American miners.
- Twelve miners were killed at the La Blanc mine near Pachuca, Hidalgo, Mexico, when a cable attached to a cage broke, causing the cage and its occupants to fall 350 metres (1,150 ft).
- Born:
  - Bob Bartlett (born Edward Lewis Bartlett), American politician, member of the United States Senate from Alaska; in Seattle, Washington (d. 1968, complications from heart surgery)
  - Bruce Cabot (born Étienne de Pelissier Bujac, Jr.), American film actor; in Carlsbad, New Mexico Territory (d. 1972, lung cancer)
  - Electioneer, American Thoroughbred racehorse; in Kentucky
- Died:
  - Jim Kennedy, 41–42, American Major League Baseball manager, died of a heart attack on a Brooklyn elevated railroad train.
  - Sara Jane Lippincott (born Sara Jane Clarke; a.k.a. Grace Greenwood), 80, American journalist, died of bronchitis.

== April 21, 1904 (Thursday) ==
- In San Francisco, a 3:51 a.m. earthquake lasted about three seconds and caused no damage.
- Born:
  - Daniel L. Fapp, American cinematographer; in Kansas City, Kansas (d. 1986)
  - Odilo Globocnik, Austrian Nazi and Holocaust perpetrator; in Trieste, Austria-Hungary (d. 1945, suicide by cyanide pill)
  - Jean Hélion, French painter; in Couterne, Orne, France (d. 1987)
  - Basil Hopko, eparch of the Slovak Greek Catholic Church; in Hrabské, Sáros County, Kingdom of Hungary (d. 1976, aftereffects of torture and imprisonment)
  - Gabriel Loire, French stained glass artist; in Pouancé, France (d. 1996)
- Died:
  - Piatus of Mons (born Jean-Joseph Loiseaux), 88, Belgian Roman Catholic theologian
  - William Williams, 64, Welsh businessman and politician, Member of Parliament

== April 22, 1904 (Friday) ==
- At a house adjacent to the Winter Palace in Saint Petersburg, Russia, the wife of Russian General Strandman and a valet were murdered and thousands of rubles worth of bonds and securities were stolen.
- In Smithville, Texas, aeronaut Prof. Charles Raymond (the professional name of W. J. Stevens) was injured in a balloon accident. He would die of his injuries on April 26 at St. Paul's Sanitarium in Dallas.
- An Alabama state society with 50 charter members was organized in Los Angeles. Jurist and writer Aurelius W. Hutton presided at the meeting to organize the society. Membership was restricted to white people.
- Born:
  - J. Robert Oppenheimer, American physicist; in New York City (d. 1967, throat cancer)
  - Ramnath Goenka, Indian newspaper publisher; in Darbhanga, Bengal Presidency, British India (d. 1991)
  - Nélson Monteiro de Souza, Brazilian Olympic basketball player (year of death unknown)
  - María Zambrano, Spanish essayist and philosopher; in Vélez-Málaga, Province of Málaga, Spain (d. 1991)
- Died:
  - Thomas J. Brady, 65, American politician and Union Army officer
  - Florence Cook, 47, English medium, died of pneumonia.

== April 23, 1904 (Saturday) ==
- Firefighters Jacob Bleyhle, William B. Crane and Leo Ross of the Newark Fire Department in New Jersey were killed by a fallen wall while fighting a fire at the Werner & Co. saddlery hardware factory. 15 other firefighters were injured.
- Grave robbers stole two coffins from the vault at the Henry W. Livingston House in Livingston, New York, one of which contained the remains of General Livingston's wife, Mary Masters Allen Livingston. The thieves also destroyed General Livingston's coffin, scattering his bones around the vault, and opened all the other coffins, dumping out the bones inside. Police believed the robbers were searching for jewels rumored to have been buried with Mary Livingston. Carroll Livingston, a grandson of General and Mrs. Livingston, would die a few days after the robbery at age 71.
- The town of Miltonvale, Kansas was almost completely destroyed by a fire that caused over $60,000 in damage.
- At a competition in Berkeley, California, Stanford University athlete Norman E. Dole set a new world record of 12 feet 1.32 inches (3.6911 m) in the pole vault.
- World heavyweight champion boxer James J. Jeffries married Freda Meyer in Oakland, California.
- Born:
  - Clifford Bricker, Canadian Olympic long-distance runner; in St. George, Ontario, Canada (d. 1980)
  - George Randolph Hearst, American media executive, son of William Randolph Hearst; in Washington, D.C. (d. 1972)
  - Ivor Montagu, English filmmaker, writer, table tennis player and Communist activist; in Kensington, London, England (d. 1984)
  - Louis Muhlstock, Polish Canadian painter; in Narajów, Galicia, Poland, Austria-Hungary (d. 2001)
  - Duncan Renaldo (born Vasile Dumitru Cugheanos), Romanian-born American actor; in Oancea, Galați County, Romania (possibly in Camden, New Jersey) (d. 1980, lung cancer)
- Died: Joseph Stewart, 82, United States Army officer

== April 24, 1904 (Sunday) ==
- The Victor Talking Machine factory in Camden, New Jersey was destroyed by fire, causing $500,000 in damage and the loss of thousands of irreplaceable original records.
- Soldiers James N. Bowers and Eugene Coone were killed and 18 people injured in a crash between a light engine and a troop train at Harthoum, 3 miles (4.8 km) west of Needles, California.
- A tornado killed six people, including four children, and injured several others about 4 miles (6.4 km) south of Pryor Creek, Indian Territory.
- Born:
  - Willem de Kooning, Dutch American artist; in Rotterdam, Netherlands (d. 1997, Alzheimer's disease)
  - Herbert Zipper, Austrian American composer, conductor and arts activist; in Vienna, Austria (d. 1997)
- Died:
  - Frederick Gale, 80, English cricketer and cricket writer
  - Robert Kay, 78, English-born Australian librarian and museum director
  - Norodom of Cambodia, King of Cambodia, 70
  - William Pittenger, 64, Union Army soldier, Andrews' Raider and Methodist Episcopal pastor, one of the inaugural recipients of the Medal of Honor
  - Joseph Powell, 75, member of the United States House of Representatives from Pennsylvania
  - Jonathan Saxton Campbell Würtele, QC, 76, Quebec seigneur, lawyer, judge and politician, died of a hemorrhage.

== April 25, 1904 (Monday) ==
- The Chinese protected cruiser Hai Tien was wrecked on the Elliott rocks at Shanghai.
- Two Parisian marble statues in the sculpture exhibit at the Louisiana Purchase Exposition's French pavilion were discovered to have been destroyed by vandals, who also stole six rose trees from the pavilion's gardens.
- Nick Chiles, the editor of the Topeka Plaindealer, an African American newspaper, received a letter from Cardinal Rafael Merry del Val, the Cardinal Secretary of State of the Holy See, in response to an August 1903 resolution of the Western Negro Press association which Chiles had forwarded to Pope Pius X through U.S. Senator Joseph R. Burton and Cardinal James Gibbons, the Archbishop of Baltimore. The resolution had urged the Pope to support better treatment of African Americans. In the letter Merry del Val conveyed the Pope's response to the resolution in the third person, writing, "His holiness, as the vicar of Christ, extends his loving care to every race without exception and he must necessarily use his good offices to urge all Catholics to befriend the negroes, who are called to share in all the great benefits of the redemption... Whilst frankly admitting that crimes may often be committed by members of the negro races, his holiness advocates for them the justice granted to other men by the laws of the land and a treatment in keeping with the tenets of Christianity."
- Herbert Beerbohm Tree established an Academy of Dramatic Art, which would later become RADA, at His Majesty's Theatre in the Haymarket (London).
- Born:
  - René Cogny, French army corps general; in Saint-Valery-en-Caux, Normandy, France (d. 1968 in crash of Air France Flight 1611)
  - Huey Long, American jazz singer (The Ink Spots); in Sealy, Texas (d. 2009)
- Died: Octave Gréard, 76, French educator

== April 26, 1904 (Tuesday) ==
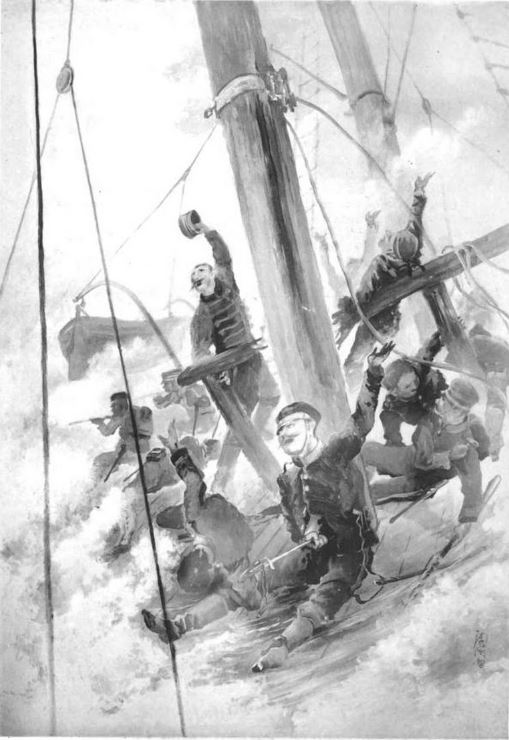
Last stand by Japanese troops aboard the transport Kinshu Maru

- At 11:15 p.m. on April 25, Russian ships returning to Vladivostok encountered the Japanese transport Kinshu Maru, which refused the Russian demand to surrender. At 1:30 a.m. on April 26 the Russians disabled Kinshu Maru with a torpedo. While the Japanese ship's five officers committed suicide below decks, the soldiers and sailors on deck began firing on the Russians with their rifles. The Russian vessels fired back at the Japanese troops with machine guns until another torpedo strike sank the Kinshu Maru at about 2 a.m. 74 Japanese soldiers and sailors died, while 45 escaped by boat. The survivors would reach Gensan on April 29.
- A fire which began at midnight on April 25 destroyed about 200 houses in Buczacz, Austria-Hungary, leaving about 3000 people homeless.
- At the Robinson mine in South Africa, 43 native workers fell 1,000 feet (300 m) down a shaft to their deaths as a result of a lift cage accident.
- No one was injured in an assassination attempt on Antonio Maura, the Prime Minister of Spain, while he was on his way from the Balearic Islands to Madrid. Between 30 and 40 men fired at Maura's train with revolvers between Alicante and San Vicente.
- Eighty Filipinos of various tribes arrived in Tacoma, Washington, aboard the liner Tremont on their way to the World's Fair in St. Louis.
- Born:
  - Nick Dennis, Greek American film actor; in Thessaly, Greece (d. 1980)
  - Aatos Jaskari, Finnish Olympic wrestler; in Nurmo, Seinäjoki, Finland (d. 1962)
  - Paul-Émile Léger, Canadian Roman Catholic cardinal; in Salaberry-de-Valleyfield, Quebec, Canada (d. 1991)
  - Jimmy McGrory, Scottish footballer and manager; in Garngad, Glasgow, Scotland (d. 1982)
  - Xenophon Zolotas, Greek economist and politician, Prime Minister of Greece; in Athens, Greece (d. 2004, multi-organ failure)
- Died:
  - Will Accooe, 30, American musician and songwriter
  - John Kissig Cowen, 59, American railroad executive, member of the United States House of Representatives from Maryland, died of heart trouble.
  - Julien Foucaud, 56, French botanist
  - Thaha Syaifuddin, Sultan of Jambi, 87–88, was killed by Dutch soldiers.

== April 27, 1904 (Wednesday) ==
- The Australian Labor Party became the first such party to gain national government, under Chris Watson.
- A wall collapse killed Firefighters Hugh F. Arragoni, John J. Crean and Thomas F. Madigan of the New York City Fire Department.
- In Braddock, Pennsylvania, three people were killed, three seriously injured and five buildings damaged or destroyed by the explosion of a Baltimore and Ohio Railroad engine.
- At a celebration of Ulysses S. Grant's birthday in Galena, Illinois, Grant's son, General Frederick Dent Grant, presented his father's former residence to the city.
- John Green Brady, Governor of the District of Alaska, narrowly escaped injury while in St. Louis for the opening of the World's Fair. A bicycle knocked him into the path of a streetcar, forcing him to throw himself off the tracks in time to avoid being run over.
- On his hunting trip in Colorado, President Roosevelt was kept in camp all day by a recurrence of malarial fever.
- A meeting of business presidents in San Francisco proposed a world's fair in that city to celebrate the eventual completion of the Panama Canal. The Panama–Pacific International Exposition would be held in 1915, also celebrating the city's recovery from the 1906 San Francisco earthquake.
- Born:
  - Cecil Day-Lewis, English poet; in Ballintubbert, County Laois, Ireland (d. 1972, pancreatic cancer)
  - Francesco Gabrieli, Italian Arabist; in Rome, Italy (d. 1996)
  - Hilda James, British Olympic swimmer; in Warrington, County Borough of Warrington, England (d. 1982)
  - Syd Nathan, American record producer, music industry executive and founder of King Records; in Cincinnati, Ohio (d. 1968, heart disease complicated by pneumonia)
  - Fritz Weitzel, German SS commander; in Frankfurt (Main), Germany (d. 1940, aerial attack)
- Died:
  - Mykhailo Starytsky, 63, Ukrainian poet and writer
  - John William Williams, 77, New Zealand politician, member of the New Zealand House of Representatives

== April 28, 1904 (Thursday) ==
- A cave-in at a coal mine in Villanueva del Río y Minas, Seville, Spain, killed 63 miners in the worst mining accident in the country's history.
- American novelist Stewart Edward White married Elizabeth G. Grant at Trinity Church in Newport, Rhode Island.
- In the planning of the upcoming Methodist general conference in Los Angeles, the accommodation of African American delegates became a cause for concern. The management of some hotels, although already under contract to house conference delegates, were unwilling to accommodate African American delegates on an equal basis. G. S. Holmes, proprietor of the Angelus, commented, "I will meet the question half way, but as long as I live there will be no negroes allowed in my main dining room. I had rather close the place up entirely."
- Four people died in a fire at the Bryan house, a hotel in Lansing, Michigan.
- Born:
  - Elvio Banchero, Italian Olympic and professional footballer; in Alessandria, Province of Alessandria, Italy (d. 1982)
  - Elisabeth Schumacher (born Elisabeth Hohenemser), German artist, photographer and Resistance member; in Darmstadt, Germany (d. 1942, execution by decapitation)
- Died:
  - Alanson Cooke, 92, Canadian businessman and politician
  - Oliver Edwards, 69, American machine company executive, inventor and Union Army officer
  - Nellie Farren (born Ellen Farren), 56, English actress and singer, died of cardiac failure.
  - Hiram M. Van Arman, 65, American Union Army officer, politician and journalist
  - Agesilaus Wilson, 61, American politician, member of the Wisconsin State Assembly

== April 29, 1904 (Friday) ==
- Tom Searcy, an African American man, was lynched in Haywood County, Tennessee, for an alleged attempted assault on a 9-year-old girl.
- William Wardjon, a national organizer of the United Mine Workers of America, was pistol-whipped by three men aboard a train car in Sargents, Colorado, and sustained a concussion. Wardjon identified one of his assailants as Lyte Gregory, a detective from the Reno agency, who would be assassinated on May 15.
- Born:
  - Eleanore Griffin, American screenwriter; in Saint Paul, Minnesota (d. 1995)
  - Russ Morgan, American big band leader and arranger; in Scranton, Pennsylvania (d. 1969)
  - Felix Smeets, Dutch Olympic and professional footballer; in The Hague, Netherlands (d. 1961)
  - Ken Terrell, American actor and stunt performer; in Coolidge, Georgia (d. 1966, arteriosclerosis)
- Died: Andrew Scott Irving, 66, Scottish-born Canadian bookseller and publisher

== April 30, 1904 (Saturday) ==
- The Battle of the Yalu River, the first major land battle of the Russo-Japanese War, began.

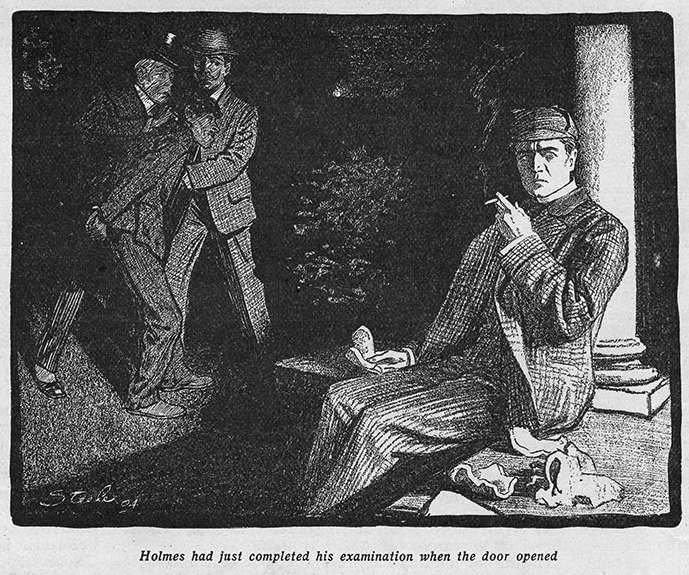
Sherlock Holmes examines evidence while a criminal is arrested in "The Adventure of the Six Napoleons"

- The Sherlock Holmes short story "The Adventure of the Six Napoleons" by Sir Arthur Conan Doyle was published for the first time in Collier's in the United States.
- In a suburb of Washington, D.C., Alexander Graham Bell gave a demonstration of tetrahedral kites to members of the National Geographic Society. The test was considered unsuccessful due to uncertain winds.
- U.S. Army Captain Charles Young, the first African American graduate of the United States Military Academy, was assigned as a military attaché to Haiti.
- The Louisiana Purchase Exposition opened in St. Louis, Missouri. At 1:04 p.m. Central Time, after a band led by John Philip Sousa had sounded a fanfare at the fairgrounds, President Roosevelt pressed a golden key at the White House in Washington, D.C., to turn on the fair's fountains, officially opening the fair. The exposition would close on December 1.
- Eight people were killed and 16 injured in the wreck of a World's Fair special train 1.5 miles (2.4 km) north of Kimmswick, Missouri.
- In Kirkwood, Missouri, the city armory was destroyed by fire while most of the city's residents were at the World's Fair for opening day.
- Mary McDonald was fatally injured in the Cleveland, Cincinnati, Chicago and St. Louis Railway yards in South Cumminsville, Cincinnati. She would die the following morning, believed to be the victim of the first of the unsolved serial killings known as the Cumminsville murders.
- German engineer Christian Hülsmeyer received a patent for the "Telemobiloskop", an early device that used radio waves to detect distant metal objects like ships, laying the groundwork for radar technology.
- Born:
  - Willi Mentz, German non-commissioned SS officer and Holocaust perpetrator; in Schönhagen, Germany (d. 1978)
  - George Stibitz, American inventor; in York, Pennsylvania (d. 1995)
- Died:
  - Welcome A. Botkin, 67, ex-husband of convicted murderer Cordelia Botkin
  - William M. Wilson, 66, American politician, member of the Iowa Senate
