= May 1904 =

Month of 1904

<<	May 1904					>>
Su	Mo	Tu	We	Th	Fr	Sa
1	2	3	4	5	6	7
8	9	10	11	12	13	14
15	16	17	18	19	20	21
22	23	24	25	26	27	28
29	30	31

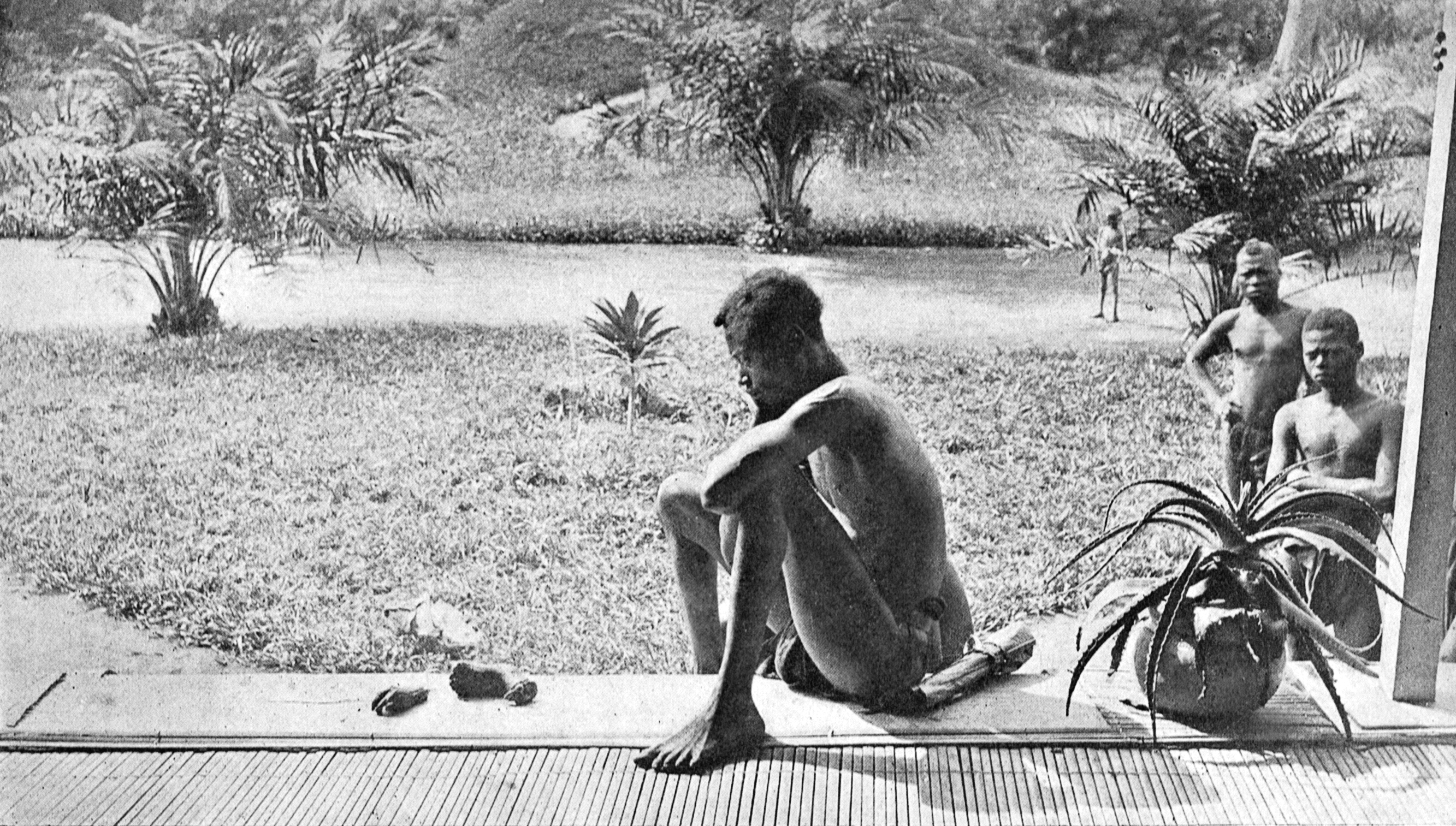
May 15, 1904: Nsala of Wala in the Nsongo District by Alice Seeley Harris

The following events occurred in May 1904:

== May 1, 1904 (Sunday) ==
- The Battle of the Yalu River, the first major land battle of the Russo-Japanese War, ended in a Japanese victory.
- On International Workers' Day, Russian railway workers held a protest in Tashkent, Russian Empire. The Armenian Social-Democratic Labour Organization organized a strike of between 4,000 and 5,000 Armenian workers in Balakhani, Russian Empire. In memory of the Haymarket defendants, 70,000 anarchist workers marched in the streets of La Boca, Buenos Aires, Argentina. 18-year-old sailor Juan Ocampo was killed in a crackdown by authorities.

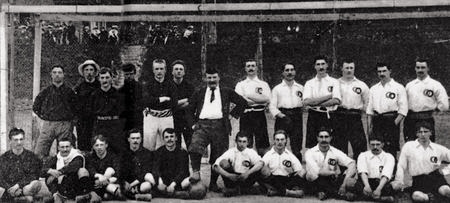
Belgian and French teams for Évence Coppée Trophy match (French players in white)

- The Belgian and French national association football teams made their debuts in the Évence Coppée Trophy, a match at the Stade du Vivier d'Oie in Uccle, Brussels, Belgium. The game ended in a 3–3 draw; therefore, the trophy itself was not awarded.
- Colonel Ismael Montes was elected President of Bolivia.
- The construction of Orchestra Hall began in Chicago, Illinois.
- At a drinking party in Duncan, Iowa, James Banda died after drinking carbolic acid. A coroner's jury concluded that someone handed Banda the acid. It remains unclear whether or not Banda was murdered.
- Born:
  - John Abt, American lawyer and politician; in Chicago, Illinois (d. 1991)
  - Carlos J. Anderson (a.k.a. Carlos Andreson), American painter and illustrator; in Midvale, Utah (d. 1978)
  - José Bonifácio Lafayette de Andrada, Brazilian lawyer and politician; in Barbacena, Brazil (d. 1986)
  - Emil Augsburg, German SS functionary and war criminal; in Łódź, Kingdom of Poland, Russian Empire (d. 1981)
  - Wally Downer (born Alfred Wallace Downer), Canadian politician and Anglican priest, Speaker of the Legislative Assembly of Ontario; in Lefaive's Corners (near Penetanguishene in Simcoe County), Ontario, Canada (d. 1994)
  - Katherine Grant, American actress; in Los Angeles, California (d. 1937, pulmonary tuberculosis with dementia praecox psychosis)
  - M. Donald Grant, Canadian American businessman, chairman and minority owner of the New York Mets; in Montreal, Quebec, Canada (d. 1998)
  - Donn Greenshields, National Football League tackle; in Cleveland, Ohio (d. 1961, suicide by carbon monoxide poisoning)
  - Anton Janda, Austrian footballer and coach; in Vienna, Austria-Hungary (d. 1985)
  - Joel (born Joel de Oliveira Monteiro), Brazilian footballer; in Rio de Janeiro, Brazil (d. 1990)
  - Sigmund Neumann, German American political scientist and sociologist; in Leipzig, German Empire (d. 1962)
  - Tom Oswald, Scottish Member of Parliament; in Leith, Scotland (d. 1990)
  - Lucia Pamela, American musician and bandleader; in St. Louis, Missouri (d. 2002, cardiac arrest)
  - M. P. Paul, academic and literary critic of Malayalam; in Puthenpally Varapuzha, Ernakulam district, Kerala, India (d. 1952)
  - Fred Spencer, American animator (Walt Disney Productions); in Missouri (d. 1938, automobile accident)
  - Paul Sterian, Romanian poet and civil servant; in Bucharest, Romania (d. 1984)
- Died:
  - Antonín Dvořák, 62, Czech composer, died of a stroke (possibly a pulmonary embolism).
  - William Collett, 64, English cricketer
  - Charles N. Fox, 75, Associate Justice of the Supreme Court of California, died of paralysis of the brain.
  - Wilhelm His Sr., 72, Swiss anatomist
  - Andrew Kiefer, 71, German American politician, member of the United States House of Representatives from Minnesota
  - James Massie, 70, Canadian businessman and politician, member of the Legislative Assembly of Ontario
  - Mary McDonald, 32, first victim of the Cumminsville murders

== May 2, 1904 (Monday) ==
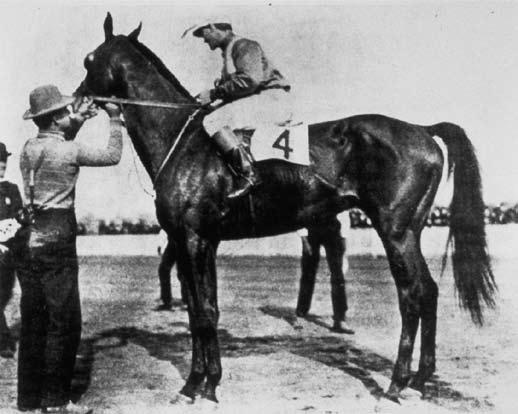
Elwood, winner of the 1904 Kentucky Derby

- The horse Elwood, ridden by jockey Frank Prior, won the 1904 Kentucky Derby at Churchill Downs in Louisville, Kentucky. Elwood was the first Kentucky Derby winner to be owned by a woman, Lasca Durnell.
- Born:
  - Bruno Bianchi, Italian Olympic champion sailor; in Genoa, Province of Genoa, Italy (d. 1988)
  - Bill Brandt (born Hermann Wilhelm Brandt), German-born British photographer; in Hamburg, Germany (d. 1983)
  - Maurice Estève, French painter; in Culan, Cher, France (d. 2001)
- Died:
  - Émile Duclaux, 63, French microbiologist
  - Edgar Fawcett, 56, American poet and novelist
  - Alexander Wade, 72, American educator, died of an obstruction of the stomach.

== May 3, 1904 (Tuesday) ==
Jerrold Robertshaw as Demon Alcohol in The Fairy's Dilemma

- The Fairy's Dilemma, the final full-length play by W. S. Gilbert, received its world premiere at the Garrick Theatre in the City of Westminster, London, England.
- In Hobart, Oklahoma Territory, lightning struck a farmhouse, killing four sleeping children.
- Born:
  - Roberto Agramonte, Cuban philosopher and politician; in Villa Clara Province, Cuba (d. 1995)
  - William L. Hendricks, United States Marine Corps Reserve colonel and film producer, founder of Toys for Tots (d. 1992)
- Died: James Reid, 64, Canadian businessman and politician

== May 4, 1904 (Wednesday) ==
- The German association football club FC Schalke 04 was established as Westfalia Schalke.
- Charles Rolls and Henry Royce, the founders of Rolls-Royce Limited, met for the first time in Manchester, England.
- While dynamiter John Croft was attempting to demolish the remains of a building destroyed in the Great Fire of Toronto on April 19, a charge that had failed to detonate exploded in his face while he was inspecting it. Croft would die at 9:50 a.m. on May 5, the only fatality caused by the previous month's fire.
- The United States Army Corps of Engineers began work on the Panama Canal.
- Born:
  - Adele Bei, Italian trade unionist and politician; in Cantiano, Province of Pesaro and Urbino, Italy (d. 1976)
  - Antonino Buenaventura, Filipino composer, conductor and teacher; in Baliuag, Bulacan, Philippine Islands (d. 1996)
  - Joaquín García Morato, Spanish fighter ace; in Melilla, Spain (d. 1939, plane crash)
  - Josef Pieper, German Catholic philosopher; in Elte, North Rhine-Westphalia, German Empire (d. 1997)
  - Umm Kulthum (born Fatima Ibrahim es-Sayyid el-Beltagi), Egyptian singer, songwriter and film actress; in El Senbellawein, Dakahlia Governorate, Egypt (date of birth uncertain) (d. 1975, kidney failure)
  - Bruno Wolke, German professional road bicycle racer; in Neukölln, Berlin, Germany (d. 1973)
- Died: Ashbel P. Fitch, 55, American lawyer and financier, member of the United States House of Representatives from New York, died of apoplexy.

== May 5, 1904 (Thursday) ==
- Hundreds of Tibetans attacked the camp of the British expedition to Tibet at Changlo in Gyantse, holding the advantage for a while before being defeated by superior weapons and losing at least 200 men.

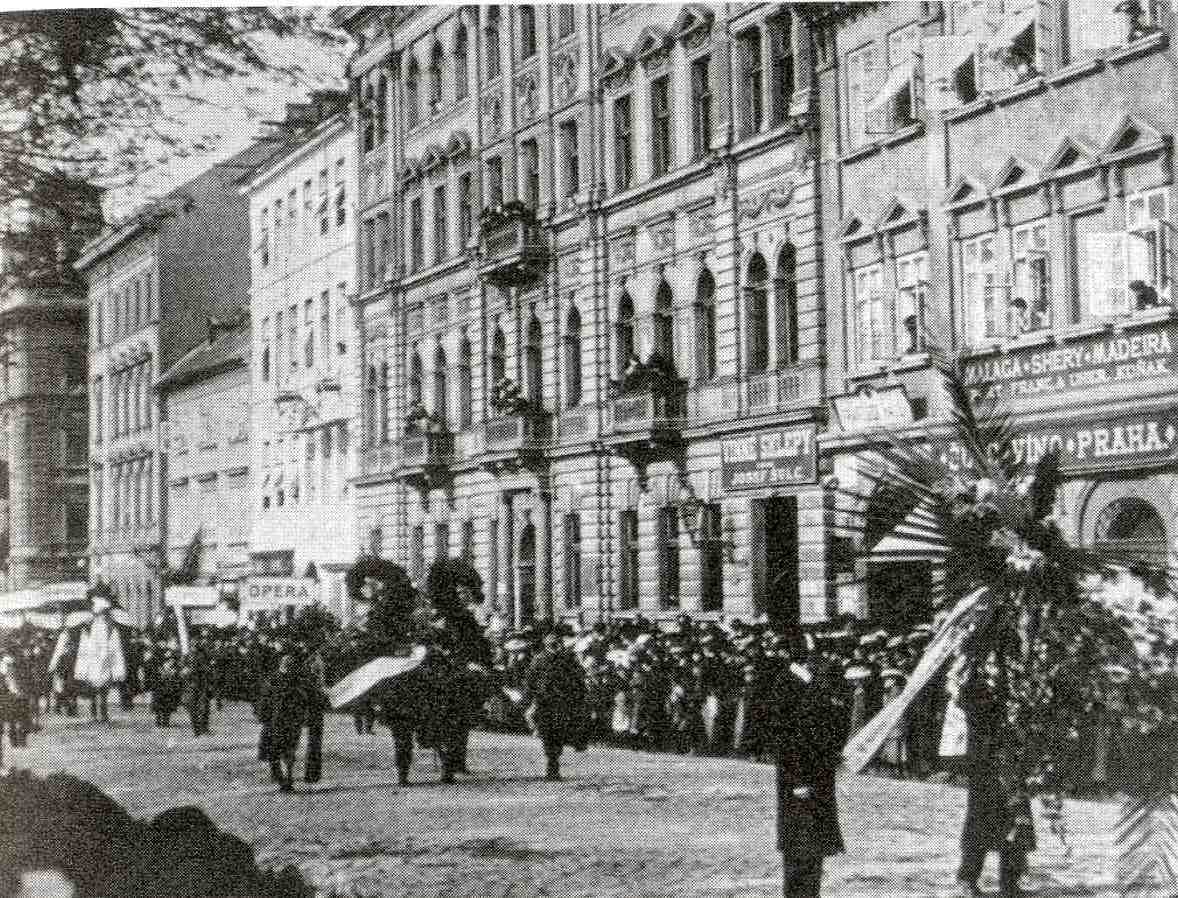
Funeral of Antonín Dvořák

- Thousands of people attended the funeral of Czech composer Antonín Dvořák in Prague.
- Belgian driver Pierre de Caters set a new world land speed record of 97.539 miles per hour (156.974 km/h), driving a Mercedes racing car in Ostend, Belgium.
- Pitching against the Philadelphia Athletics at the Huntington Avenue Grounds, Cy Young of the Boston Americans threw the first perfect game in the modern era of baseball.
- The Philadelphia City Council passed a resolution providing for the Liberty Bell to be exhibited at the Louisiana Purchase Exposition in St. Louis, Missouri. The Bell's departure from Philadelphia was scheduled for early June.
- The national convention of the Socialist Party of America nominated Eugene V. Debs and Ben Hanford for President and Vice President of the United States.
- Born:
  - Alston Scott Householder, American mathematician; in Rockford, Illinois (d. 1993)
  - Robert Kronfeld, Austrian-born gliding champion and Royal Air Force test pilot; in Vienna, Austria-Hungary (d. 1948, glider crash)
  - Gordon Richards, English jockey; in Donnington Wood, Shropshire, England (d. 1986)
- Died: Mór Jókai (born Móric Jókay de Ásva), 79, Hungarian novelist, died of inflammation of the lungs.

== May 6, 1904 (Friday) ==
- In Yosemite, California, fire destroyed the residence and studio of landscape photographer George Fiske, along with 30 years' worth of Fiske's negatives.
- Born:
  - Raymond Bailey, American actor; in San Francisco, California (d. 1980, heart attack)
  - Una Cameron, Scottish mountaineer; in West Linton, Peeblesshire, Scotland (d. 1987)
  - Moshé Feldenkrais, Ukrainian-born Israeli engineer and physicist; in Slavuta, Russian Empire (d. 1984)
  - Catherine Lacey, English actress; in London, England (d. 1979)
  - Max Mallowan, British archaeologist, second husband of Agatha Christie; in Wandsworth, London, England (d. 1978)
  - Harry Martinson, Swedish writer, recipient of the Nobel Prize in Literature; in Jämshög, Blekinge County, Sweden (d. 1978, suicide by sharp instrument)
  - Renzo Minoli, Italian Olympic champion fencer; in Milan, Province of Milan, Italy (d. 1965)
  - Montgomery Tully, Irish film director and writer; in Dublin, Ireland (d. 1988)
- Died:
  - Emanuel Vogel Gerhart, 86, American minister of the German Reformed Church
  - Franz von Lenbach, 67, German painter
  - John B. Sanborn, 77, American lawyer and politician, Union Army general
  - Alexander William Williamson, 80, English chemist

== May 7, 1904 (Saturday) ==
- A human crush during a massive celebration in Tokyo of Japanese war victories caused 21 deaths and 40 injuries.
- The 1. Spielklasse Bezirk Braunschweig, an association football league, was founded in the Duchy of Brunswick.
- In Woodbridge, California, aeronaut Frank Hamilton unsuccessfully attempted to make a parachute jump from a balloon in a gale, falling 100 feet (30 m) and landing on his head, causing him to lose consciousness.
- Born:
  - Elisabeth Grasser, Austrian Olympic fencer; in Neudörfl, Mattersburg District, Austria (d. 2002)
  - Val Lewton (born Vladimir Ivanovich Hofschneider or Leventon), Russian American novelist, film producer and screenwriter; in Yalta, Russian Empire (d. 1951, heart attack)
  - David Sullivan, Irish American labor leader; in Cork, Ireland (d. 1976)
- Died:
  - Manuel Candamo, 62, Peruvian politician, 23rd President of Peru, died of cardiac syncope.
  - Émile-Jules Dubois, 50, French physician, deputy in the National Assembly
  - Andrew McNally, 68, Irish-born American publisher, died of heart disease.

== May 8, 1904 (Sunday) ==
- Near Simpatem, on the eastern shore of Lake Liguasan, Mindanao, Philippines, a group of Moros attacked a detachment of the United States Army 17th Infantry Regiment that was searching for insurgent leader Datu Ali. The Moros killed Lieutenants Harry A. Woodruff and Joseph H. Hall and fifteen enlisted men.
- The Sugar Museum, the world's first museum devoted to the subject of sugar, opened in Wedding, Berlin, Germany. It would close as an independent museum in 2012.
- Mrs. Amelia F. M. Billingsley of Toledo, Ohio, was arrested after her arrival by train in Washington, D.C., where she said she had intended to call on First Lady Edith Roosevelt at the White House to warn her of "political intrigue directed against the Government". Mrs. Billingsley, who claimed to have been a personal friend of William McKinley and Mark Hanna, had caused a disturbance in her train car.
- Half of the town of Utica, Michigan, was destroyed by fire, causing $100,000 in damage.
- The Director of Exhibits at the Louisiana Purchase Exposition received a cablegram from Saint Petersburg announcing that Russia would place an exhibit at the fair after all. Russia had previously pulled out of the exposition due to the Russo-Japanese War.
- Born:
  - Fredie Blom, South African supercentenarian; in Adelaide, Cape Colony (d. 2020)
  - Paul J. Kramer, American biologist and plant physiologist; in Brookville, Indiana (d. 1995)
  - Boris Livanov, Soviet actor and theater director; in Moscow, Russian Empire (d. 1972)
  - John Snagge, British radio personality; in Chelsea, London, England (d. 1996)
- Died:
  - Richard Xavier Baxter, 83, Canadian Roman Catholic priest and venerable
  - Eadweard Muybridge, 74, British photographer and motion picture pioneer, died of prostate cancer.
  - Frederick York Powell, 54, English historian and scholar

== May 9, 1904 (Monday) ==
- From May 9 to May 11, the Imperial Russian Navy armored cruiser Rossia carried a balloon on a raiding cruise against Japanese ships into the Sea of Japan in the first use by a warship of a balloon on the high seas in wartime. The balloon made 13 successful ascents before it broke its mooring lines and was damaged after landing on the sea.
- Great Western Railway of England 3700 Class 3440 City of Truro possibly became the first railway locomotive to exceed 100 miles per hour (160 km/h).
- In Manhattan, New York City, a motorman was killed and five passengers seriously injured in a rear-end crash between two elevated trains.
- U.S. President Theodore Roosevelt established rules for the governance of the Panama Canal Zone, granting the Panama Canal Commission legislative powers over the area.
- In Washington, D.C., a wind and rain storm caused a brief panic at a Barnum & Bailey circus performance at which two of President Roosevelt's children, Ethel and Archibald, were present. The panic caused no injuries, and the President's children reportedly were not frightened.
- Born:
  - Gregory Bateson, English anthropologist, social scientist and cyberneticist; in Grantchester, England (d. 1980)
  - Conrad Bernier, French-Canadian musician and teacher; in Quebec City, Canada (d. 1988)
  - Pol Demeuter (born Leopold Demeuter), Belgian motorcycle racer; in Ganshoren, Belgium (d. 1934, injuries from race crash)
  - David MacDonald, Scottish film director and producer; in Helensburgh, Dunbartonshire, Scotland (d. 1983)
  - Reinhard Schwarz-Schilling, German composer; in Hanover, Germany (d. 1985)
  - Grete Stern, German Argentine photographer; in Wuppertal-Elberfeld, German Empire (d. 1999)
  - Gösta Stoltz, Swedish chess grandmaster; in Stockholm, Sweden (d. 1963)
- Died:
  - George Johnston Allman FRS, 79, Irish mathematician, scholar and historian
  - Aleksandar Bresztyenszky, 60, Croatian writer
  - Bonaventura Gargiulo, 61, Italian Capuchin friar and Roman Catholic bishop
  - Eduard Pleske, 51, Russo-German statesman, Minister of Finance of Russia

== May 10, 1904 (Tuesday) ==
- August Horch Motorwagenwerke AG, one of the predecessors of the Audi company, was founded in Zwickau, Germany.
- An iron bar fell from the top of the Ferris Wheel at the Louisiana Purchase Exposition, striking a laborer on the head and killing him. 100 of the man's colleagues beat and kicked a doctor who refused to take the dead worker to the hospital and suggested calling the morgue wagon instead.
- The Methodist General Conference, meeting in Los Angeles, California, adopted a resolution presented by Rev. Mr. Hammond of Tennessee condemning the racism shown by some hotels and restaurants in refusing to serve African American conference delegates.
- Born:
  - James Roy Andersen, United States Army Air Forces general; in Racine, Wisconsin (d. 1945, plane crash)
  - David Brown, English industrialist; in Huddersfield, Yorkshire, England (d. 1993)
  - Kurt Sucksdorff, Swedish Olympic ice hockey goaltender; in Stockholm, Sweden (d. 1960)
- Died:
  - Sir Henry Morton Stanley GCB (born John Rowlands), 63, Welsh American explorer
  - Émile Sarrau, 66, French chemist

== May 11, 1904 (Wednesday) ==
- In Herrin, Illinois, 8 miners were killed or fatally injured in a powder explosion in the shaft of the Big Muddy Coal and Iron Company.
- In Fresno, California, boxer Johnnie Bryant was fatally injured in the ninth round of a fight with Walter Robinson. Bryant would die of a brain hemorrhage at 1 a.m. on May 12.
- Born:
  - Salvador Dalí (born Salvador Domingo Felipe Jacinto Dalí Doménech), Spanish artist; in Figueres, Catalonia, Spain (d. 1989, heart failure)
  - Hans Lion, Austrian Olympic fencer; in Vienna, Austria (d. 1969)
- Died:
  - William Alexander, 62–63, Scottish architect
  - Hans Grisebach, 55, German architect and bibliophile
  - David Breakenridge Read, 80, Canadian lawyer, author and former Mayor of Toronto
  - Ante Šupuk, 65, Croatian politician and entrepreneur, mayor of Šibenik

== May 12, 1904 (Thursday) ==
- Cavaleiro Fernando de Oliveira was killed fighting the bull Ferrador in the Campo Pequeno Bullring in Lisbon, Portugal.
- Born: Adolphe Groscol, Belgian Olympic sprinter (d. 1985)
- Died:
  - Isabella Eugénie Boyer, 62, French model
  - Robert Reid, 61, Scottish-born Australian politician, died of a diabetic coma.

== May 13, 1904 (Friday) ==
- At the Hotel Wolcott in New York City, analytical chemist H. Liebler told a special committee of experts appointed by the United States Secretary of Agriculture that radium would soon replace "deleterious substances" as a food preservative through the use of bottles and cans washed with radioactive water.
- Professor Antoine Danton, a high diver with the J.J. Jones Carnival Co., was killed performing a 110-foot (34 m) dive while intoxicated in Goldsboro, North Carolina.
- A California jury pronounced Anderson Garred, who had shot and killed former Oregon county sheriff Andrew J. McKinnon in Guerneville, California, on September 8, 1903, to be insane.
- Born:
  - José Bello, Spanish intellectual and writer; in Huesca, Aragon, Spain (d. 2008)
  - Louis Duffus, Australian-born South African cricketer and writer; in Melbourne, Victoria, Australia (d. 1984)
  - Neville George (born Thomas Neville George), Welsh geologist; in Morriston, Swansea, Wales (d. 1980)
  - Ernest Henry (born George Ernest Morrison Henry), Australian Olympic freestyle swimmer; in Grafton, New South Wales, Australia (d. 1998)
  - Chishū Ryū, Japanese actor; in Tamamizu, Kumamoto Prefecture, Japan (d. 1993)
  - Edoardo Severgnini, Italian Olympic and professional cyclist; in Milan, Province of Milan, Italy (d. 1969)
- Died:
  - Walter Carpenter, 70, British Royal Navy admiral and cricketer
  - Eugen Kumičić, 54, Croatian writer
  - Ottokar Lorenz, 71, German genealogist
  - Gabriel Tarde (born Jean Gabriel de Tarde), 61, French sociologist

== May 14, 1904 (Saturday) ==
- Clara Barton resigned as president of the American Red Cross and was succeeded by Mrs. General John A. Logan.
- Robert McLane, the Mayor of Baltimore, married Mary Van Bibber, a widow 12 years his senior, in Washington, D.C. Newspapers would subsequently report rumors that McLane's family did not approve of the marriage. McLane would die of a gunshot wound to the head on May 30; the death would be ruled a suicide.
- Born:
  - Léon Dostert, French-born American scholar of languages; in Longwy, France (d. 1971)
  - Hans Albert Einstein, Swiss American engineer and educator, son of Albert Einstein; in Bern, Switzerland (d. 1973, heart failure)
  - Marcel Junod, Swiss physician; in Neuchâtel, Switzerland (d. 1961, heart attack)
  - Lola Todd, American silent film actress; in New York City (d. 1995)
- Died:
  - Rita Barcelo y Pages, 61, Spanish Augustinian religious sister and servant of God
  - Fyodor Bredikhin, 72, Russian astronomer
  - Emmanuel Drake del Castillo, 48, French botanist
  - Walter Henry Wilson JP FICE FRINA, 64, Irish ship designer, partner in Harland & Wolff

== May 15, 1904 (Sunday) ==
- The Russian minelayer Amur laid a minefield about 15 miles (24 km) off Port Arthur, and sank the Japanese battleships Hatsuse, 15,000 tons with 496 crew, and Yashima. On the same day, the Japanese protected cruiser Yoshino sank after being accidentally rammed by the armored cruiser Kasuga, killing over 270 crew, including Captain Sayegi and his second-in-command, Commander Hirowateri. Japan would keep the loss of Yashima secret for over a year.
- Documenting atrocities in the Congo Free State, English missionary Alice Seeley Harris took the iconic photograph Nsala of Wala in the Nsongo District, showing a Congolese man with the severed hand and foot of his murdered five-year-old daughter.
- In Denver, Colorado, Lyte Gregory, a detective and former police officer, was assassinated in the early morning hours. John Combs, whose wife thought she recognized the murderer's voice as that of her husband, was arrested for the crime. William Wardjon of the United Mine Workers of America had accused Gregory of being one of three men who pistol-whipped him aboard a train car in Sargents, Colorado, on April 29.
- The Dreamland amusement park opened at Coney Island in New York City at 4 p.m., three hours later than scheduled.
- Born:
  - Gustaf Adolf Boltenstern Jr., Swedish Army officer and Olympic champion equestrian; in Stockholm, Sweden (d. 1995)
  - Clifton Fadiman, American intellectual and radio and TV personality; in Brooklyn, New York City (d. 1999, pancreatic cancer)
  - Paul D. Harkins, United States Army general; in Boston, Massachusetts (d. 1984)
  - Vladas Jakubėnas, Lithuanian musician and musicologist; in Biržai, Lithuania (d. 1976)
  - Georg Knöpfle, German Olympic and professional footballer and coach; in Schramberg, Baden-Württemberg, Germany (d. 1987)
- Died: Étienne-Jules Marey, 74, French inventor

== May 16, 1904 (Monday) ==
- Irish author James Joyce won the third-prize medal at the Feis Ceoil singing competition at the Ancient Concert Rooms in Dublin, Ireland.
- In his inaugural address as Governor of Louisiana, Newton C. Blanchard said, "No approach toward social equality or social recognition will be ever tolerated in Louisiana. Separate schools, separate churches, separate cars, separate places of entertainment will be enforced. Racial distinction and integrity must be preserved. But there is room enough in this broad southland, with proper lines of limitation and demarcation, for the two races to live on terms of mutual trust, mutual help, good understanding and concord. The South asserts its ability to handle and solve the negro question on humanitarian lines—those of justice and of right. We brook no interference from without."
- Born:
  - Hugh Plaxton, Canadian lawyer, Olympic ice hockey champion and National Hockey League player and politician, member of the House of Commons of Canada; in Barrie, Ontario, Canada (d. 1982)
  - Bruno Sorić, Croatian Olympic rower for Italy; in Zadar, Kingdom of Dalmatia, Austria-Hungary (d. 1942, killed in action)
- Died: Harold Finch-Hatton, 47, British politician and Australian federationist, died of heart failure.

== May 17, 1904 (Tuesday) ==
- The song cycle Shéhérazade by Maurice Ravel received its world premiere at the Salle du Nouveau Théâtre in Paris, France, performed by soprano Jeanne Hatto and conducted by Alfred Cortot.
- Born:
  - Marie-Anne Desmarest (born Anne-Marie During), French novelist; in Mulhouse, Haut-Rhin, France (d. 1973)
  - Fernand Dineur, Belgian cartoonist; in Anderlecht, Belgium (d. 1956)
  - Warren B. Duff, American film and television writer and producer; in San Francisco, California (d. 1973, cancer)
  - Jean Gabin (born Jean-Alexis Moncorgé), French actor; in Paris, France (d. 1976, leukemia)
  - Charles Hapgood, American college professor and author; in New York City (d. 1982)
  - John J. Williams, member of the United States Senate from Delaware; near Frankford, Sussex County, Delaware (d. 1988)
- Died:
  - Tomás Cámara y Castro, 56, Spanish Roman Catholic bishop
  - Haynes King, 72, English genre painter, died by suicide.
  - James B. Martindale, 68, American attorney, founder of Martindale-Hubbell
  - Princess Pauline of Saxe-Weimar-Eisenach, 51, died of heart disease.

== May 18, 1904 (Wednesday) ==
- An imperial edict opened the Chinese ports of Chinanfu, Weishien and Chantsun to international trade.
- A group of bandits led by Mulai Ahmed er Raisuni abducted Greek American playboy Ion Perdicaris and his stepson, British subject Cromwell Varley, from Perdicaris' summer home, 3 miles (4.8 km) from Tangier, Morocco, beginning the Perdicaris affair. Raisuni would make extensive demands in return for the two men's release, causing the United States to send warships to Tangier to ensure that Sultan Abdelaziz of Morocco met Raisuni's terms. Perdicaris and Varley would be released in June 1904.
- Born:
  - René Boileau (born Joseph Lorenzo Lionel Boileau), Canadian National Hockey League centre; in Pointe-Claire, Quebec, Canada (d. 1969)
  - Jacob Javits, American lawyer and politician, Attorney General of New York, member of the United States House of Representatives and United States Senate from New York, recipient of the Presidential Medal of Freedom; in New York City (d. 1986)
  - François Marty (born Gabriel Auguste François Marty), French Roman Catholic cardinal, Archbishop of Paris; in Vaureilles, Pachins, France (d. 1994, automobile accident)
  - Frederick Scherger, Royal Australian Air Force officer; in Ararat, Victoria, Australia (d. 1984)
  - Herbert Spiegelberg, American philosopher; in Straßburg, Alsace-Lorraine, German Empire (d. 1990)
- Died:
  - John Acland, 80, English-born New Zealand runholder and politician
  - James B. Hume, 77, American lawman

== May 19, 1904 (Thursday) ==
- In Michigan, Judge Henry Mandell of the Wayne Circuit Court, an unmarried man, advised mechanic A. R. Sobke, who had requested an injunction against his wife, to go home and spank her if her misbehavior continued. A week earlier, Mandell had ruled that husbands should be the sole heads of their households.
- Born:
  - Gordon Adamson, Canadian architect; in Orangeville, Ontario, Canada (d. 1986)
  - Nella Maria Bonora, Italian actress and voice actress; in Mantua, Lombardy, Italy (d. 1990)
  - Anthony Bushell, English actor and director; in Westerham, Kent, England (d. 1997)
  - Daniel Guérin, French anarcho-communist author; in Paris, France (d. 1988)
  - Sven Thofelt, Swedish Olympic épée fencer, Olympic champion modern pentathlete and International Olympic Committee member; in Stockholm, Sweden (d. 1993)
- Died:
  - Auguste Molinier, 52, French historian
  - Jamsetji Tata, 65, Indian industrialist

== May 20, 1904 (Friday) ==
- Colonel Theodore A. Bingham of the United States engineers had one leg amputated. A falling derrick had broken both of Bingham's legs on March 19.
- Born:
  - Margery Allingham, British detective fiction writer; in Ealing, London, England (d. 1966, breast cancer)
  - Darwin Teilhet, American author and advertising executive, Newbery Honor winner under pseudonym Cyrus Fisher; in Wyanet, Illinois (d. 1964)

== May 21, 1904 (Saturday) ==
- In Paris, France, seven national associations established the International Federation of Association Football (FIFA).
- At Van Cortlandt Park in the Bronx, New York City, teams from Yale University and Princeton University played the first-ever intercollegiate polo match in the United States. During the last half of the game, Princeton player W. G. Devereaux accidentally struck freshman Yale player Henry Denison Babcock, Jr., on the temple with a polo mallet. Babcock laughed off suggestions that the injury might be serious, but would die at his home at 4 a.m. on May 22 as a result of the accident.
- At a county workhouse in Delaware, 500 people watched the floggings of 16 offenders at the whipping post. Two African American thieves – Samuel Fisher, who was serving a five-year sentence for robbing a woman of $1, and Henry Irons – each stood for an hour in the pillory before being lashed with a cat-o-nine-tails. Fisher received 40 lashes and Irons 30.
- During a track and field competition between the University of Michigan and the University of Chicago at Marshall Field in Chicago, Michigan athlete Ralph Rose set a new world record of 48 feet 7.2 inches (14.813 m) in the shot put.
- Born:
  - Robert Montgomery (born Henry Montgomery Jr.), American actor and director; in Fishkill Landing, New York (d. 1981, cancer)
  - Fats Waller (born Thomas Wright Waller), American pianist and comedian; in Harlem, New York City (d. 1943, pneumonia)
  - James Crawford, Scottish Olympic footballer; in Shettleston, Glasgow, Scotland (d. 1976)
- Died: Ormonde, 21, English Thoroughbred racehorse, died of paralysis.

== May 22, 1904 (Sunday) ==
- In Findlay, Ohio, the Lake Shore Novelty Works factory was completely destroyed by an explosion that killed 7 workers, some of them teenagers, and seriously injured several others.
- In South Minneapolis, Minnesota, the body of Peter O. Elliott was found hanging from a railroad bridge girder. Elliott, who had been arrested in Washington, D.C., several months earlier on suspicion of planning to kill President Roosevelt, had apparently committed suicide by hanging.
- Born:
  - Anne de Vries, Dutch writer; in Kloosterveen, Netherlands (d. 1964)
  - Pierino Gabetti, Italian sailor and Olympic champion weightlifter; in Sestri Ponente, Genoa, Italy (d. 1971)
  - Uno Lamm (born August Uno Lamm), Swedish electrical engineer and inventor; in Gothenburg, Sweden (d. 1989)
  - Pyotr Sobolevsky, Soviet actor; in Tomsk, Tomsk Governorate, Russian Empire (d. 1977)
- Died:
  - Georges Gilles de la Tourette, 46, French neurologist, namesake of Tourette syndrome, died of status seizure, apoplexy and/or neurosyphilis.
  - Charles Elwood Brown, 69, American lawyer and politician, member of the United States House of Representatives from Ohio
  - Charles Burke, 50, English first-class cricketer
  - George Walsh, 52, English cricketer

== May 23, 1904 (Monday) ==
- At Huffman Prairie, Ohio, the Wright brothers made their first flight attempt in the Wright Flyer II. This attempt and another on May 25 were unsuccessful.
- Born:
  - Johannes Flintrop, German critic of the Nazi Party; in Barmen, Germany (d. 1942 in Dachau concentration camp)
  - Libby Holman (born Elizabeth Lloyd Holzman), American actress, singer and activist; in Cincinnati, Ohio (d. 1971, carbon monoxide poisoning, ruled suicide)
  - Karl Seitz, Austrian Olympic water polo player; in Vienna, Austria (d. 1990)
- Died:
  - Augustus Caesar Buell, 56, American author of fabricated biographies
  - Robert McLachlan FRS, 67, English entomologist

== May 24, 1904 (Tuesday) ==
- In advance of the Battle of Nanshan in the Russo-Japanese War the Japanese Fourth Division under the command of Lieutenant General Ogawa Mataji attacked the Russian-held town of Jinzhou just north of Nanzan hill, during a heavy thunderstorm. The Fourth Division failed on two attempts to breach the gates of Jinzhou, and the next day, two battalions from the Japanese First Division attacked at dawn and took the town.Kowner, Rotem (2006). Historical Dictionary of the Russo-Japanese War. The Scarecrow Press. pp. 250–251. ISBN 0-8108-4927-5.
- Born:
  - Arthur Roy Clapham, British botanist; in Norwich, England (d. 1990)
  - Sefton Delmer (born Denis Sefton Delmer), British journalist and World War II propagandist; in Berlin, German Empire (d. 1979)
  - Ding Delong, Chinese National Revolutionary Army general; in You County, Hunan, China (d. 1996)
  - Princess Elizabeth of Greece and Denmark; in Tatoi Palace, Kingdom of Greece (d. 1955, cancer)
  - Chūhei Nambu, Japanese Olympic champion track and field athlete; in Sapporo, Hokkaido, Japan (d. 1997, pneumonia)
- Died:
  - Myer S. Isaacs, 63, Jewish-American lawyer and judge, died of heart disease.
  - Friedrich Siemens, 77, German entrepreneur

== May 25, 1904 (Wednesday) ==
- In Tandil, Argentina, Calabrian shoemaker Guido Dinelli flew his "Aeroplano apparatus" glider attached to a bicycle for 180 metres (590 ft), becoming the second person known to have made a gliding flight in South America.* Japanese forces bombarded the Russian positions at Kinchau and Nanshan.
- A fire that destroyed much of the U.S. town of Yazoo City, Mississippi began at 8:30 a.m and consumed 200 buildings, causing losses of more than $1,600,000. One person was killed, and the city's mayor was seriously injured. Yazoo City legend would later claim that the fire was caused by a witch avenging her death exactly twenty years earlier.

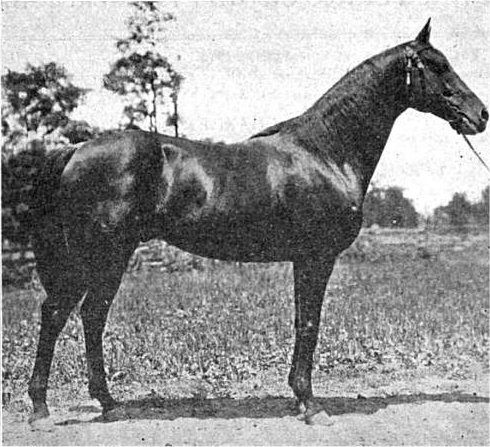
Delhi, winner of the 1904 Belmont Stakes, circa 1912

- The horse Delhi, ridden by jockey George M. Odom, won the 1904 Belmont Stakes at Morris Park Racecourse in the Bronx, New York City.
- In Williamstown, Dauphin County, Pennsylvania, ten coal miners were asphyxiated by fumes from a locomotive in a tunnel at the Summit Branch Coal Company. Nine of the ten men killed were members of a rescue party that entered the mine after the first victim, miner Enoch Morgan, was overcome.
- Born:
  - Eske Brun, Greenlandic civil servant; in Aalborg, Denmark (d. 1987)
  - Orla Jørgensen, Danish Olympic champion racing cyclist; in Ordrup, Gentofte Municipality, Denmark (d. 1947)
  - Lucien Lange, French racing cyclist (d. 1982)
  - Charles L. Melson, United States Navy vice admiral; in Richmond, Virginia (d. 1981)
  - Umberto Scarpelli, Italian screenwriter and film director; in Orvieto, Italy (d. 1980)
  - Kurt Thomas, German composer and conductor; in Tönning, Schleswig-Holstein, Germany (d. 1973)
  - Lizzi Waldmüller, Austrian singer and actress; in Knittelfeld, Styria, Austria (d. 1945, air raid)
- Died:
  - David Sime Cargill, 78, Scottish businessman, founder of Burmah Oil
  - Sir John Carstairs McNeill VC, GCVO, KCB, KCMG, 73, British Army major general

== May 26, 1904 (Thursday) ==
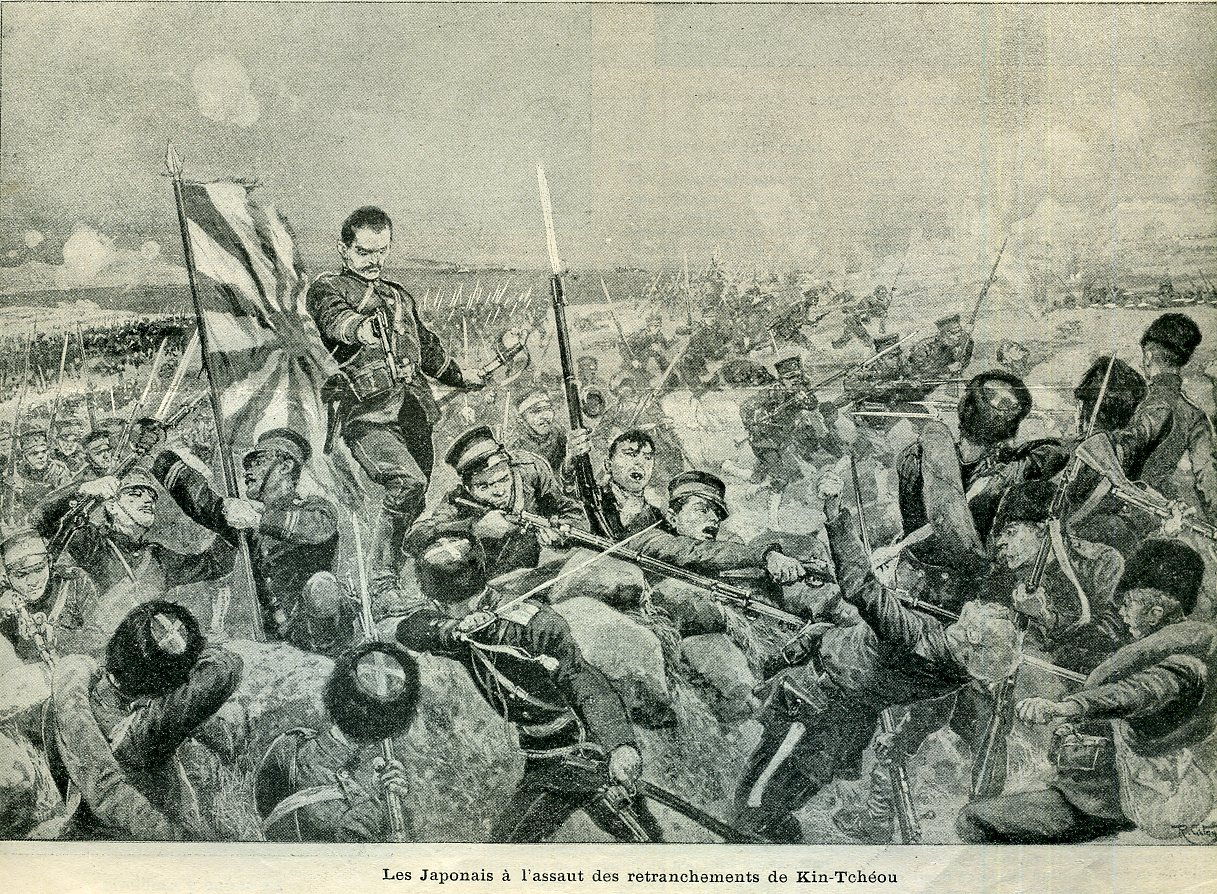
Japanese assault on Russian forces at the Battle of Nanshan

- The Battle of Nanshan ended in victory for Japanese forces, who captured Kinchau and Nanshan from the Russians and drove them back to the vicinity of Port Arthur.
- In Saint Petersburg, news of the Japanese victory at Kinchou caused the curtailment of celebrations for the anniversary of Tsar Nicholas II's coronation.
- At 3:30 a.m., 4 miles (6.4 km) from Louisville, Kentucky, the tow boat Fred Wilson was destroyed by an explosion of its boilers, killing 10 people and injuring 16.

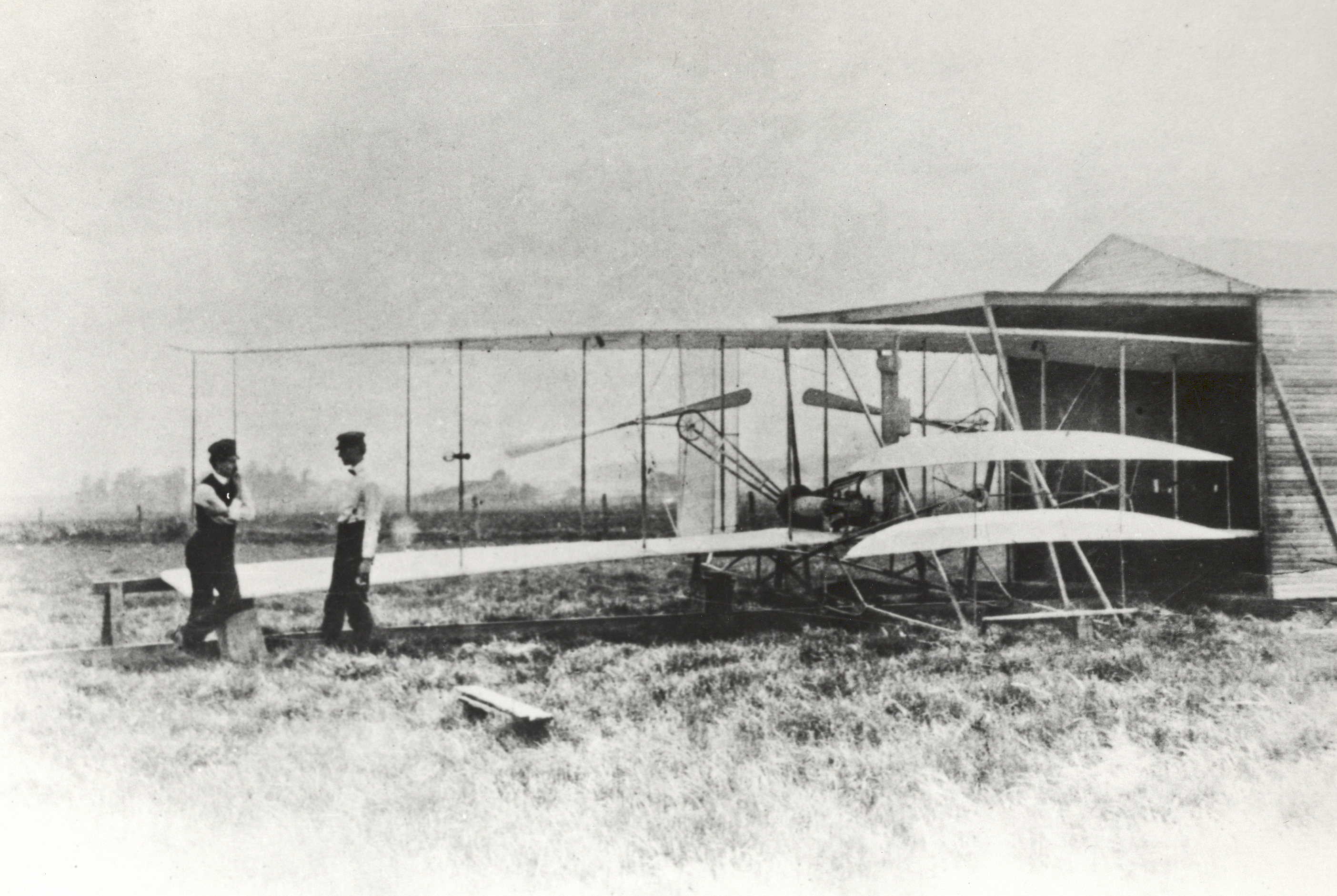
May 1904: Wilbur and Orville Wright with Flyer II at Huffman Prairie

- At Huffman Prairie, Ohio, Orville Wright made the first successful flight in the Wright Flyer II, the first of 105 flights the Flyer II would make during 1904.
- Born:
  - Vincent Alo, Italian American mobster; in Harlem, Manhattan, New York City (d. 2001)
  - George Formby (born George Hoy Booth), English singer and comedian; in Wigan, Lancashire, England (d. 1961, heart attack)
  - Vlado Perlemuter, Lithuanian-born French pianist and teacher; in Kovno, Russian Empire (d. 2002)
  - Frank Ragland, American Major League Baseball pitcher; in Water Valley, Mississippi (d. 1959)
- Died:
  - Mary Ellen Bagnall-Oakeley, 71, English antiquarian, author and painter
  - Charlton Thomas Lewis, 70, American lawyer, author and lexicographer, died of cerebrospinal meningitis.
  - Ivan, Viscount d'Oyley (born Alastair Ivan Ladislaus Lucidus Evans), 24, American Olympic fencer, shot himself on 23 May, died three days later.

== May 27, 1904 (Friday) ==
- By a vote of 427 to 95, the French Chamber of Deputies approved the government's recall of Monsieur Nisard, the French ambassador to the Holy See.
- Concurrent with the 41st anniversary of the siege of Port Hudson, a statue of William Francis Bartlett was unveiled at the Massachusetts State House in Boston.
- Alice Roosevelt, the daughter of U.S. President Roosevelt, visited the Louisiana Purchase Exposition. Because she and her escort, George D. Markham, arrived in a phaeton, the gate inspector, who had been told that they would arrive in an automobile, would not grant free admission to them and the rest of their party. Markham paid the admission fees for the whole group.
- Forty-seven dignitaries from the Philippines arrived in San Francisco, California, aboard the steamship Siberia, on their way to the World's Fair. The delegation included Trinidad Pardo de Tavera, Benito Legarda, José de Luzuriaga, Cayetano Arellano and Mariano Trías.

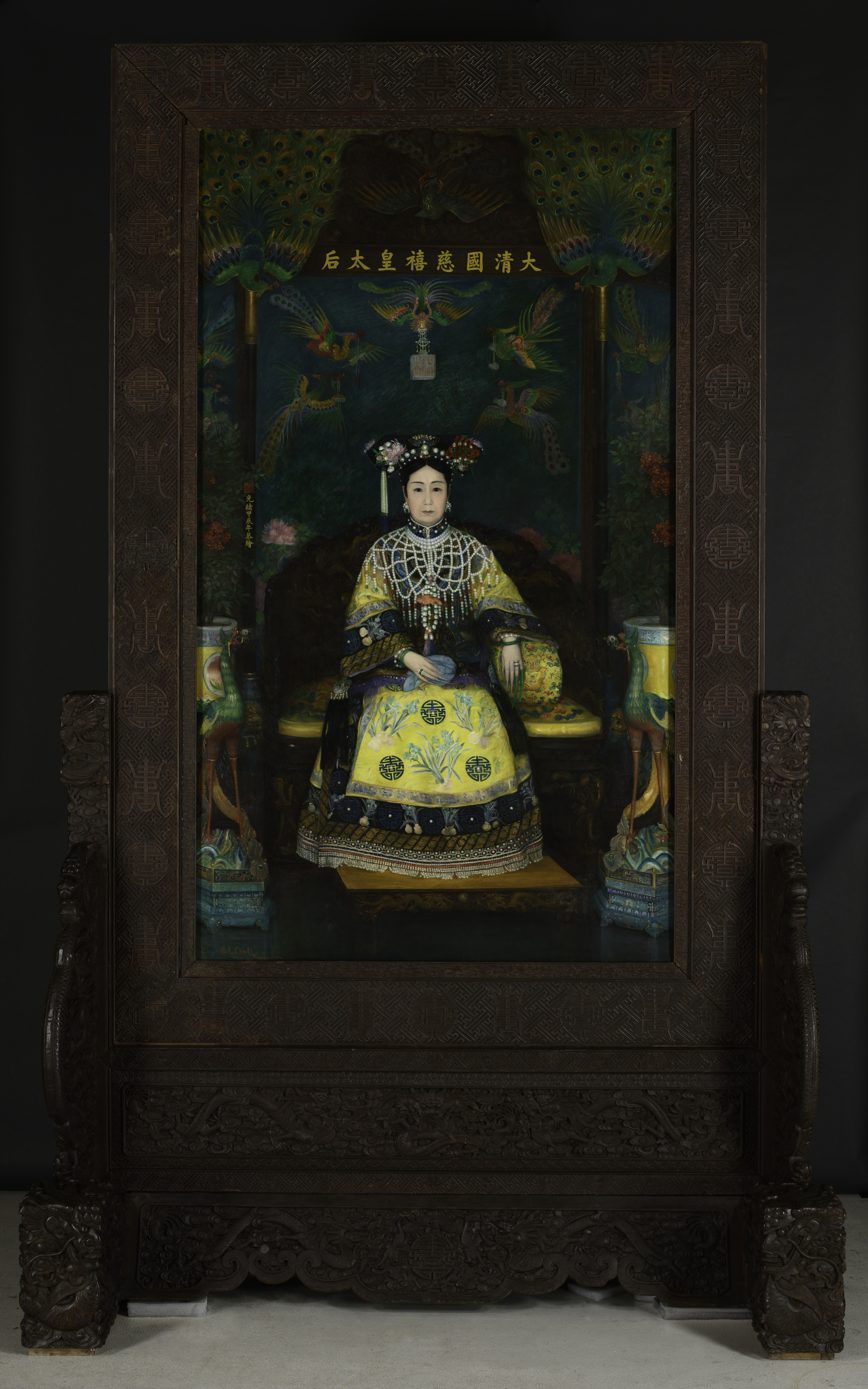
The Empress Dowager, Tze Hsi, of China, by Katharine Carl

- American artist Katharine Carl's portrait of the Empress Dowager Cixi of China arrived aboard the Siberia for exhibition at the World's Fair.
- Also aboard the Siberia, American botanist and mountain climber John Muir returned to San Francisco from a year-long trip around the world.
- Born:
  - John C. Bailar Jr., American inorganic chemist; in Golden, Colorado (d. 1991)
  - Tarcisio Fusco, Italian film score composer; in Sant'Agata de' Goti, Campania, Italy (d. 1962)
- Died:
  - François Coillard, 69, French missionary, died of haematuric fever.
  - Hannah M. Underhill Isaac, 70, American evangelist

== May 28, 1904 (Saturday) ==
- In New York City, Charles Green, an African American man, was nearly lynched after attacking two girls who were taking photographs in Central Park. Police officers rescued Green from a pursuing crowd.
- The Ferris Wheel, originally built for Chicago's World's Columbian Exposition in 1893, opened at the World's Fair in St. Louis.
- In Los Angeles, California, the Methodist General Conference voted to amend the church constitution to allow the election of bishops of non-European descent, who would serve as presidents of conferences consisting primarily of ministers of non-European descent.
- Born:
  - George Beck, British Roman Catholic prelate, Archbishop of Liverpool; in Streatham, London, England (d. 1978)
  - Giuseppe Gobbato, Italian Olympic racewalker; in Voghera, Province of Pavia, Italy (d. 1990)
  - Anne Gillespie Shaw, Scottish engineer and businesswoman; in Uddingston, Scotland (d. 1982)
- Died:
  - Kicking Bear, 59, Oglala Lakota artist and band chief of the Miniconjou Lakota
  - Matthew Quay, 70, American attorney, Union Army officer, Medal of Honor recipient and United States Senator from Pennsylvania, died of chronic gastritis.

== May 29, 1904 (Sunday) ==
- Forty-two men were missing, and four men reportedly had died, after a French Army walking match from the Place de la Concorde to Saint-Germain and back, a distance of 28 miles (45 km). 2000 soldiers participated in the march.
- In Seelyville, Indiana, 4-year-old Richmond Byers disappeared while walking from his house to a ball game, reportedly after following an "uncouth" man. Byers would never be found, although his father, Dr. Leonard S. Byers, would continue searching for him until his death in 1913.
- Born:
  - Abu Bakar of Pahang, Sultan of Pahang; in Istana Hinggap, Pekan, Pahang, Federated Malay States, British Malaya (d. 1974)
  - Grigory Ginzburg, Russian pianist; in Nizhny Novgorod, Russian Empire (d. 1961)
  - Robert Juranic, Austrian international footballer; in Vienna, Austria (d. 1973)
  - Hubert Opperman, Australian cyclist and politician; in Rochester, Victoria, Australia (d. 1996)
  - Marcel Thil, French world champion middleweight boxer; in Saint-Dizier, France (d. 1968)
  - Gregg Toland, American cinematographer; in Charleston, Illinois (d. 1948, coronary thrombosis)
- Died:
  - Pauline Åhman, 92, Swedish harpist
  - Manuel María de Zamacona y Murphy, 77, Mexican politician

== May 30, 1904 (Monday) ==
- The Russians evacuated Dalny after destroying strategic facilities in the city.
- Eleven women at Syracuse University founded Alpha Gamma Delta, which would become an international women's fraternity.
- Workman John Reynolds fell 150 feet (46 m) to his death while oiling the axle of the Ferris Wheel at the Louisiana Purchase Exposition. Reynolds' death was reportedly the third during work on the Wheel in St. Louis.
- Alice Roosevelt again visited the World's Fair, lunching with Exposition President David R. Francis and his family. In the evening the German pavilion held a ball in Alice Roosevelt's honor.
- United States federal authorities arrested four white men in connection with whitecapping in the Piney Woods section of East Texas.
- In Salida, Colorado, at least five people, most of them children, were killed when a footbridge over the Arkansas River collapsed during Memorial Day ceremonies. There were reportedly twenty people on the bridge when it collapsed.
- Born:
  - Ernesto de la Guardia, Panamanian politician, President of Panama; in Panama City, Panama (d. 1983)
  - Doris Packer, American actress; in Menominee, Michigan (d. 1979)
  - Archibald Russell, British aerospace engineer; in Cinderford, Gloucestershire, England (d. 1995)
  - Solly Zuckerman, Baron Zuckerman, British public servant and zoologist; in Cape Town, Cape Colony (d. 1993, heart attack)
  - Feliks Żukowski, Polish actor and theatre director; in Riga, Latvia (d. 1976)
- Died:
  - Frederick William, Grand Duke of Mecklenburg-Strelitz, 84
  - Robert McLane, 36, Mayor of Baltimore, died of a gunshot wound to the head (ruled a suicide).
  - Marta Anna Wiecka, 30, Polish Roman Catholic religious professed and blessed, died of typhoid.

== May 31, 1904 (Tuesday) ==
- As the British Parliament resumed following its Whitsun recess, MP and future Prime Minister Winston Churchill crossed the floor of the House of Commons, leaving the Conservative Party to join the Liberal Party. He would rejoin the Conservatives in 1925.
- In New Brunswick, Canada, guide and fisherman James Humphreys was killed by a Canadian Pacific train. Humphreys, who had recently married a woman, was discovered after his death to be a trans man.
- The Supreme Court of the United States issued its rulings in two of the Insular Cases. In the case of Dorr v. United States, the court held that inhabitants of the Philippine Islands were not guaranteed the right to trial by jury. Associate Justice John Marshall Harlan dissented from the majority's ruling. In the case of Kepner v. United States, the court found that the appeal of a lawyer's acquittal for embezzlement to the Supreme Court of the Philippines violated the Double Jeopardy Clause of the U.S. Constitution. Associate Justices Oliver Wendell Holmes Jr., Edward Douglass White, Joseph McKenna and Henry Billings Brown dissented from the majority's ruling.
- The U.S. Supreme Court also issued its ruling in the case of McCray v. United States, upholding the constitutionality of the federal tax on colored oleomargarine. Chief Justice Melville Fuller and Associate Justices Brown and Rufus W. Peckham dissented from the majority's ruling.
- The Board of Lady Managers of the Louisiana Purchase Exposition hosted Alice Roosevelt at a luncheon in the Woman's Building of the fair.
- Born:
  - Otto Hardwick, American saxophone player; in Washington, D.C. (d. 1970)
  - Nancy Welford, British-born American actress; in London, England (d. 1991)
- Died: Alberto Blanc, 68, Italian diplomat and politician
