= George Walsh (disambiguation) =

George Walsh (1889–1981) was an American actor and brother of Raoul Walsh.

George Walsh may also refer to:

- George Walsh (MP for Eye) (c. 1621–1692), English MP
- George H. Walsh (1845–1913), American newspaper editor
- George Walsh (New Zealand politician) (1899–1979), New Zealand MP
- George Walsh (cricketer) (1852–1904), English cricketer
