= Carlos Anderson =

Carlos Anderson may refer to:

- Carlos J. Anderson (1904—1978), American painter, illustrator and graphic designer
- Carlos Anderson (politician) (1960–2025), Peruvian politician
