= Pierre Reuter =

Luxembourgish footballer

Personal information
- Date of birth: 11 April 1904
- Date of death: 26 June 1969 (aged 65)

International career
Years	Team	Apps	(Gls)
1928-1930	Luxembourg	2	(0)

Pierre Reuter (11 April 1904 – 26 June 1969) was a Luxembourgish footballer. He played in two matches for the Luxembourg national football team between 1928 and 1930.
