= Emmy Braun =

German cookbook author

- Born: Ida Luise Jacob; May 25, 1826; Zweibrücken, Rhineland Palatinate, Germany
- Died: April 4, 1904 (aged 77) ibid
- Occupation: Cookbook author

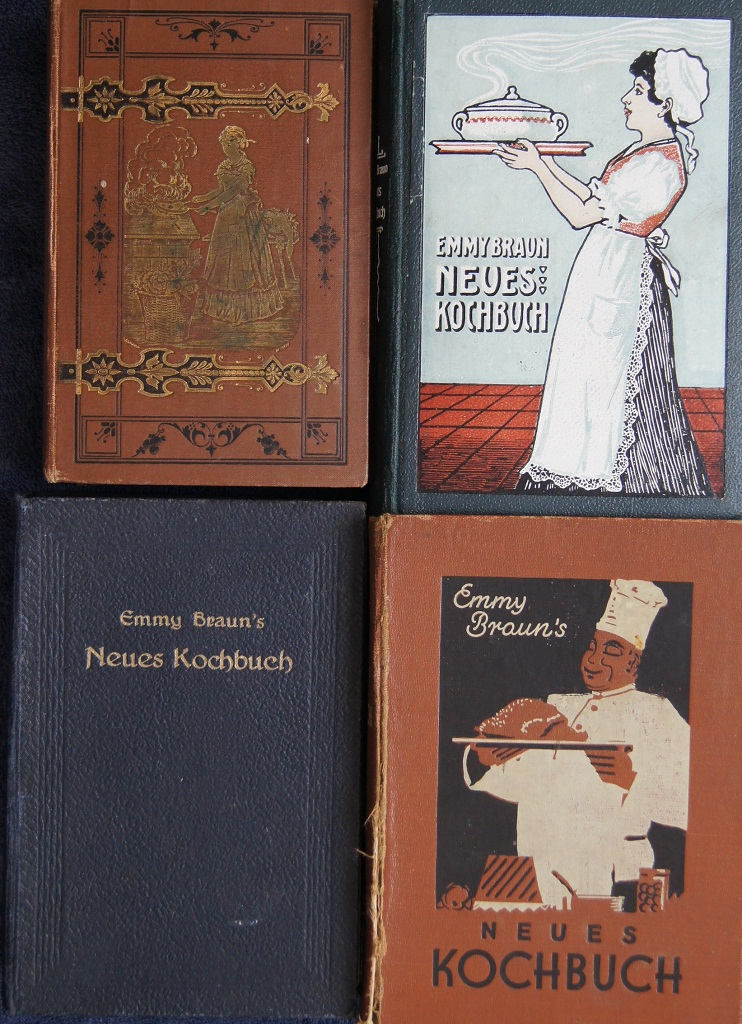
Neues Kochbuch, 1st, 12th, 17th and 18th edition (1886-1929)

Emmy Braun (the pseudonym for Ida Luise Jacob, May 25, 1826 in Zweibrücken – April 4, 1904 ibid) was a German cookbook author. She is the best-known cookbook author in the Palatinate, alongside Anna Bergner (1800-1882). Her Neues pfälzisches Kochbuch/Neues Kochbuch für bürgerliche und feine Küche a cookbook for home-style and fine cuisine was the best-selling book in the Palatinate with eleven editions at the turn of the 20th century. It was only surpassed later by Die Pälzisch Weltgeschicht by Paul Münch – a humorous history of the world in the regional dialect. In America, it was used in many households of Palatinate emigrants. A large number of second-hand copies are still available, frequently heavily annotated. Many families passed on the Neues Kochbuch from generation to generation.

== Life ==
Ida Luise was born in Zweibrücken. Her parents were the merchant Carl Philipp Lichtenberger and Louise née Jacob from Schopp. Her father was very committed to the construction of the first Palatinate railway line in the Bavarian Palatinate with his cousin Philipp Markus Lichtenberger from the Rheinschanze (Ludwigshafen since 1843). The poet Oskar von Redwitz (1823–1891) dedicated some pages in his autobiographical novel Hermann Stark. Deutsches Leben (1868) to her, "Louise in the bay window" his youth crush. In 1845 she married the doctor Franz Carl Jacob (1818-1895) a second cousin. The couple was living in Kaiserslautern and they raised two sons and two daughters. In 1865 Jacob was appointed to the "Landrath der Pfalz" and immediately elected secretary. From 1873 to 1882 he was the president of this regional parliament (today Bezirkstag Pfalz) of the Bavarian Palatinate.

In the Franco-Prussian War from 1870 to 1871, Luise Jacob and her daughters campaigned for the care of wounded and sick soldiers in the local military hospital.

During a spa stay in Cannstatt for several years, the Jacobs started to write books. Much better known than his extensive scientific works on chemistry, physics and electricity was the cookbook of his wife. She became the most successful Palatinate cookbook author under the pseudonym "Emmy Braun". It was said to be sold as often as the Bible.

Luise Jacob also became known for her embroidery, which was shown and honored at the 1893 World's Columbian Exposition in Chicago.

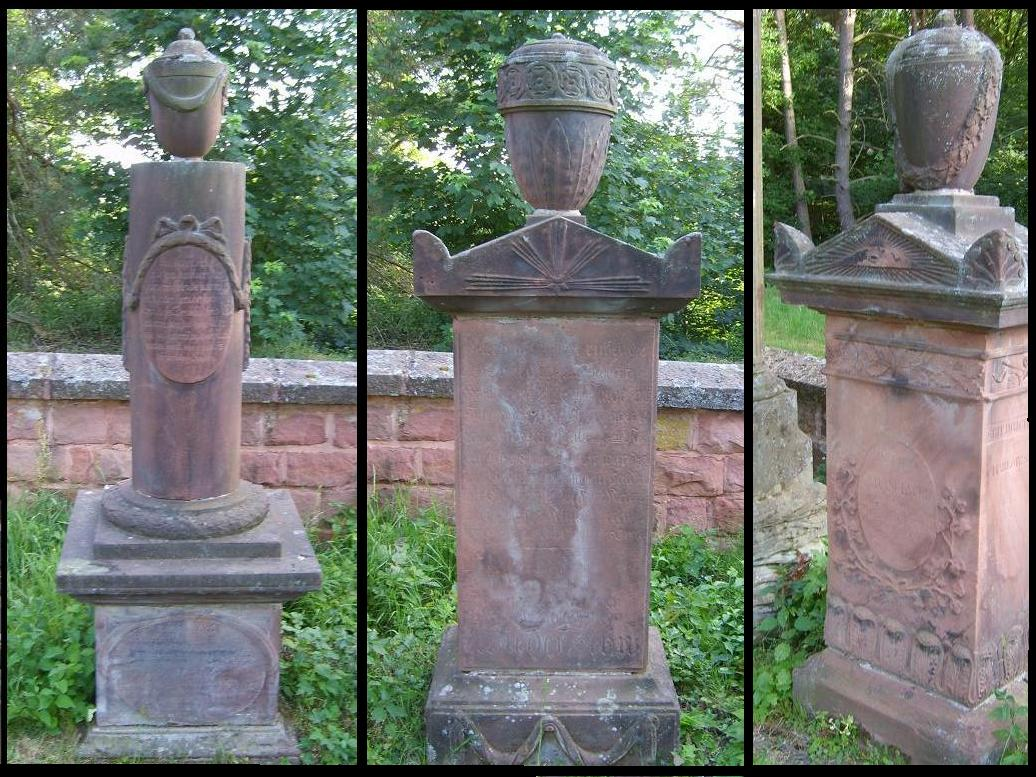
Jacob gravestones in Schopp, Elisabeth (middle) and Adam Jacob (right)

The gravestones of her grandparents Adam Jacob and Elisabeth née Scherer are listed monuments. – The American bishop Arthur C. Lichtenberger and Louis Lichtenberger are distant relatives.

== Honors ==
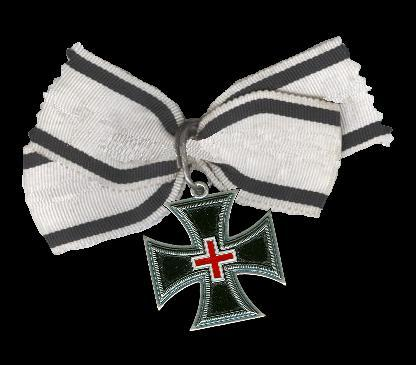
Prussian Verdienstkreuz für Frauen und Jungfrauen

- Bavarian Cross of Merit, 1871
- Prussian Cross of Merit for Women and Girls, 1871
- War medal for non-combatants, 1871

Her needlework was awarded medals and certificates of honor.

In the Oberauerbach district of Zweibrücken, Emmy Braun street is named after the author.

== Works ==
All books were published by Schäffer in Grünstadt

- Neues pfälzisches Kochbuch für bürgerliche und feine Küche, 11 editions, 1886-1910
- Neues Kochbuch für bürgerliche und feine Küche, 11 editions, 1886-1910
- Neues Kochbuch für bürgerliche und feine Küche. Neu bearbeitet von Frida Schäffer, editions 12–17, 1912-
- Emmy Braun's Neues Kochbuch. Mit einem Kochlehrbuch. Neubearbeitet und ergänzt von Frau Frida Schäffer und Lehrerinnen des Pfälzischen Wirtschaftslehrerinnen-Seminars Speyer am Rhein 18th edition, 1929
