= Alfei Jürgenson =

Estonian footballer

Personal information
- Date of birth: 8 April 1904
- Date of death: 22 August 1947 (aged 43)
- Position: Striker

International career
Years	Team	Apps	(Gls)
1924	Estonia	4	(0)

Alfei Jürgenson (8 April 1904 – 22 August 1947) was an Estonian professional footballer who played as a striker for the Estonian national football team.

== Career ==
He participated in the 1924 Paris Olympic Games with the Estonian football team. In 1924 until 1930, he played for JK Tallinn and played four games for Estonia.
