= Émile Turlant =

French doyen

- Born: 1 April 1904; Moulins-sur-Allier, France
- Died: 15 September 2013 (aged 109 years, 167 days)
- Occupation: Parachute factory worker
- Known for: Oldest living man in France
- Spouse: Lucienne Crête (married 1932–1992)

Émile Turlant (April 1, 1904 – September 15, 2013) was, at the time of his death, France's oldest living man.

== Life ==
Emile Turlant, from France, was born in Moulins-sur-Allier, a commune in the region of Auvergne in central France. He went to Paris, the French capital, to work, first working in a parachute factory and then working for the RATP Group, which is a state-owned public transport operator. He married Lucienne Crête, a seamstress, in 1932 and had no children. He was mobilized during World War II but was not called up to fight. He worked during the night while she worked during the day, which he said prevented them from spending a lot of time together. Lucienne died in 1992. Turlant retired when he was in his 50s, and in the early 1960s he moved to Nièvre at Beaumont-la-Ferrière. Emile Turlant was described by his neighbors as someone who is grumpy, never happy, and very strong. Turlant lived by himself until age 92, when he decided to move to a retirement home due to declining strength. He received visits from some local officials once or twice during every month, including visits from the mayor of Beaumont-la-Ferrière. Before his death, Turlant had very poor hearing and had trouble moving, and in addition he did not speak much. Nevertheless, he enjoyed his 108th and 109th birthday celebrations, in both cases drinking wine and eating cake. He died September 15, 2013, at the age of 109.
