= Émile Sarrau =

French chemist (1837–1904)

- Born: 24 June 1837
- Died: 10 May 1904 (aged 66)
- Scientific career
- Fields: chemistry

Jacques Rose Ferdinand Émile Sarrau (Perpignan 24 June 1837 – Saint-Yrieix 10 May 1904) was a French chemist. He worked most of his career at the laboratory in the Dépôt Central des Poudres et Salpêtres (Central Depot for Powder and Saltpetre). He did research on explosive shock waves, the effects of explosives and he developed new explosives. The Mach number was sometimes called in French the Nombre de Sarrau (Sarrau number).
