= Karl Scherm =

German footballer

Personal information
- Date of birth: 8 April 1904
- Date of death: 30 June 1977 (aged 73)
- Position: Forward

Senior career*
Years	Team	Apps	(Gls)
- ASV Nuremberg

International career
1926	Germany	2	(1)
- * Club domestic league appearances and goals

Karl Scherm (8 April 1904 – 30 June 1977) was a German international footballer.
