= Albino Binda =

Italian cyclist

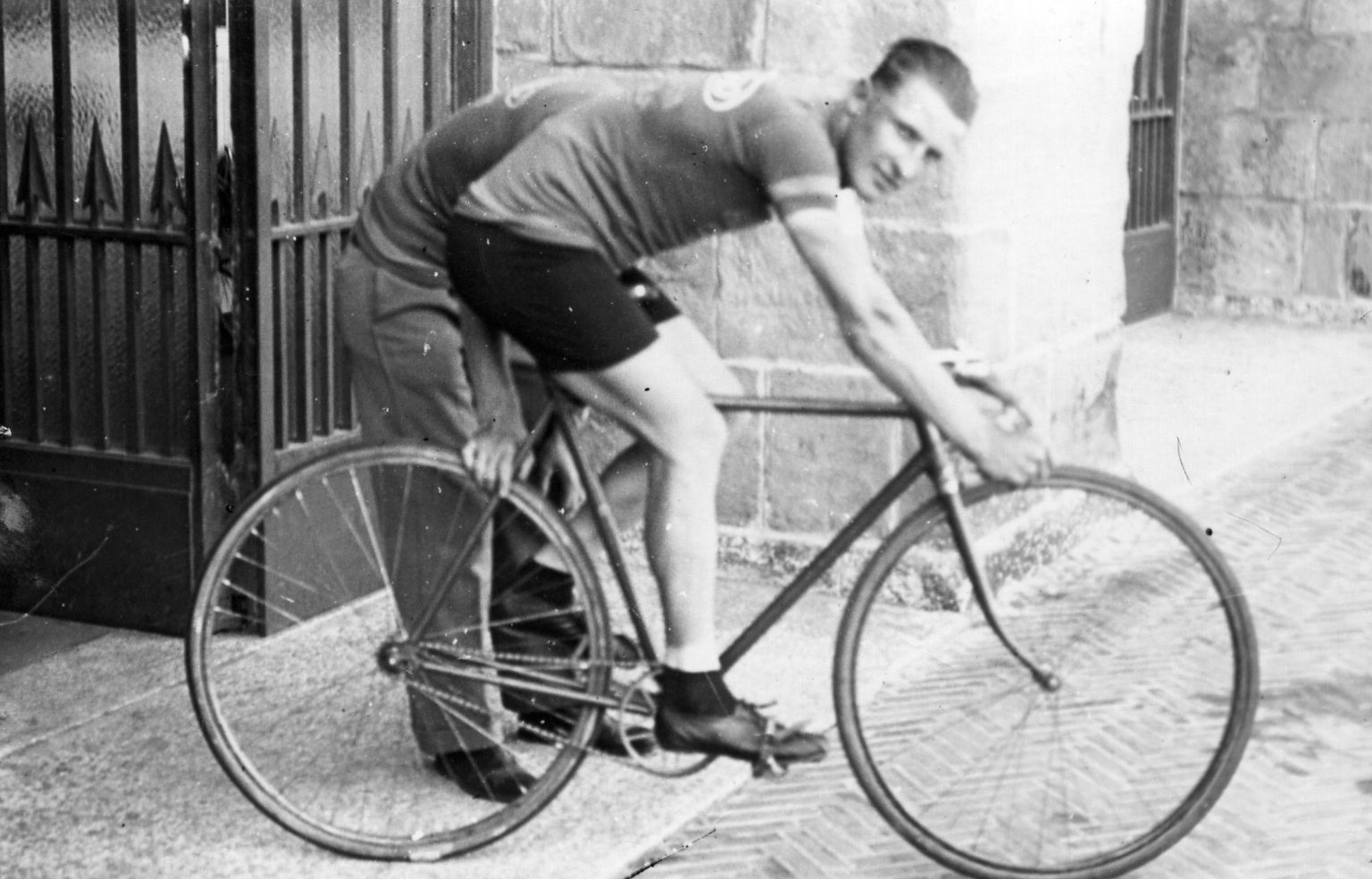

Personal information
- Born: 9 April 1904 Cittiglio, Italy
- Died: 30 March 1976 (aged 71)

Cycling career
- Sport: Cycling
- Role: Rider

Albino Binda (9 April 1904 – 30 March 1976) was an Italian racing cyclist. He won stage 8 of the 1928 Giro d'Italia. He was Alfredo Binda's younger brother.
