= David P. Wheeler =

United States Army captain

David P. Wheeler (July 18, 1876 – April 13, 1904) was a United States Army captain who served in the Spanish–American War and was killed in action in the Moro Rebellion, part of the Philippine–American War.

== Biography ==
David P. Wheeler, son of Mr. and Mrs. Benjamin Wheeler, was born on July 18, 1876, in Zanesville, Ohio, where he spent his childhood. He received his appointment as a cadet to the United States Military Academy through Congressman H. Clay Van Voorhis, entering June 15, 1894, and graduating in April 1898. He was assigned as Second Lieutenant to the 22nd Infantry Regiment and immediately sent to the Philippines for duty. He arrived there in time to see active service against the forces of Spain, and during his three years' service there he gained a splendid fighting record. On March 2, 1899, Lieutenant Wheeler was promoted to the rank of First Lieutenant. He was engaged in the action resulting in the fall of Manila in 1898, and in the Filipino Insurrection which occurred in February 1899. He fought at Tondo and Bulacan and in the engagements of San Isidro, San Pablo, Santo Tomas and Pacol.

That his services were appreciated is shown by a telegram received at Headquarters, Department Northern Luzon, which read:

Headquarters D. N. L., Manila, Oct. 12.

General Funston, San Isidro.

Please express to 1st Lieut. David P. Wheeler 22nd Infantry the gratification of the Department Commander at the capture of Delfin Esquivel and other insurgents last night, near Santa [sic] Tomas.

By command of Major General Wheaton:

ALVORD, A. A. G.

After three years' service Wheeler returned to the United States and was soon thereafter promoted to the rank of Captain. While in the States he was stationed for short periods at Fort Crook, Nebraska, and Fort Reno, Oklahoma. During a detail in the Yellowstone National Park, he was ordered to Washington, D.C. There he was placed in charge of a large sum of money which was to be transported to the Philippine Islands and in company with other members of his regiment in the late fall of 1903 he left the United States for the last time. The treasure was safely landed, and the Regiment was then assigned to duty in the Islands.

With a party, while reconnoitering the Moro works along the Taraca River in the Lake Lanao district of the Island of Mindanao, on April 11, 1904, Captain Wheeler was stabbed in the abdomen by a Moro. The wound was fatal, and Wheeler died two days later.
