= Nélson Monteiro de Souza =

Brazilian basketball player

Nélson de Souza
Personal information
- Nationality: Brazilian
- Born: 22 April 1904
- Died: 12 August 1963 (aged 59)

Sport
- Sport: Basketball

Nélson de Souza, also known as Nélson Monteiro (22 April 1904 – 12 August 1963), was a Brazilian basketball player. He competed in the men's tournament at the 1936 Summer Olympics.
