= Cumminsville Killer =

Serial murders in Ohio, U.S.

The Cumminsville Killer
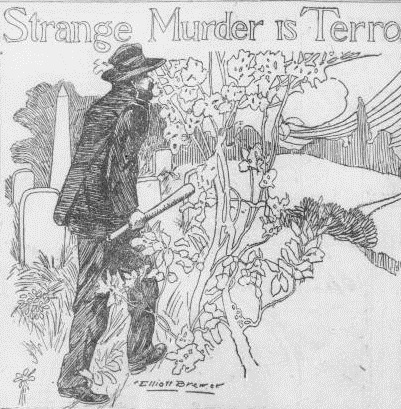
- Sketch of the Cumminsville Killer, by Elliott Brewer
- Other names: "The Cumminsville Ripper" "The Slouch Hat Man" "The Man Gorilla" "Cincinnati's Jack the Ripper"

Details
- Victims: 5
- Span of crimes: 1904–1910
- Country: United States
- State: Ohio
- Date apprehended: Never apprehended
- Imprisoned at: Never captured

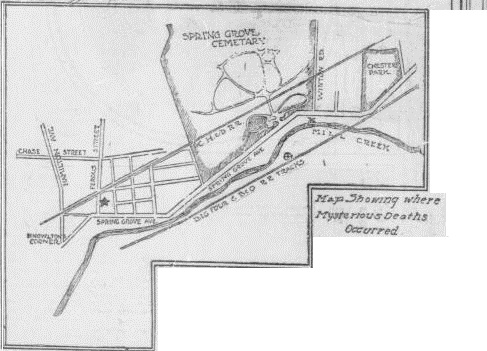
Map of the first three murders

The Cumminsville Killer, also known as the Cumminsville Ripper, the Slouch Hat Man and the Man Gorilla, was an unidentified serial killer who is believed to have claimed five victims in the Cumminsville neighborhood of Cincinnati, Ohio, United States, between 1904 and 1910. Theories have surfaced tying the murders in Cumminsville to the Dayton Strangler, another unidentified serial killer believed to have been active in the nearby city of Dayton around the same time.

== Background ==
The early 20th century was a period of rapid development in Cincinnati, Ohio, particularly in the realm of transportation. In Cumminsville, a neighborhood in the city's northwest, three major rail-based transit lines – the Baltimore & Ohio Railroad (B&O) through its southern end, the Cincinnati, Hamilton & Dayton Railway (CH&D) through its northern end and the Cincinnati Street Railway (CSR) through its center – served approximately 100 million commuters per year. The rail system traversing Cumminsville would subsequently be the key commonality in the crimes attributed to the Cumminsville Killer.

== Victims ==
=== Mary McDonald ===
On April 30, 1904, 32-year-old Mary McDonald, from Saginaw, Michigan, was murdered at the Big Four Railroad railways. McDonald lived with 24-year-old Mrs. Finley on East Seventh Street, and on the date of the murder, she had been spotted by several witnesses in the vicinity of Chester Park. Later on, McDonald visited the homes of the Stagmans, near Knowlton's Corner, with Charles Stagman later driving her back to the city. At around 11 o'clock, he left her on College Hill-Main Street, and that was the last seen of her.

In the morning, the dying McDonald was found on the railway by a freight train engineer and taken to the city hospital, where she only managed to say her name before succumbing to her injuries. She had a bruise on the back of her head, her left leg being severed up to the knee, and had been robbed of all her money. There were two theories surrounding her death: that she had been murdered because of jealousy or that the drunken McDonald, allegedly accompanied by somebody, had met her end by an incoming train. Neither theory could be backed up by evidence, especially the latter, as conductors and motormen questioned around the city did not recall a woman resembling McDonald boarding a street car. Soon following her death, the case was quickly forgotten.

=== Louise Mueller ===
On October 2, Louise Mueller's body was discovered in a clump of weeds in the district's lovers' lane. Mueller had two deep wounds extending down to her face, and the base of her skull had been fractured. According to several witnesses, Mueller, who had had multiple partners, had planned to visit her lover Frank Eastman. She had been observed listening to a Socialist orator's speech near her home and not far from the lovers' lane. Initially, it was also thought that she had been struck by a train, but it was later changed to possible homicide. There were no strong suspects in the killing, as Mueller had no known enemies and had been on good terms with her several lovers.

=== Alma Steinigewig ===
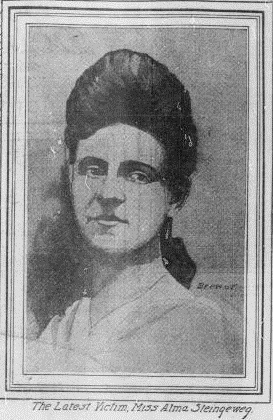
Picture of Alma Steinigewig

On November 3, the body of 18-year-old Alma Steinigewig, a highly respected telephone operator who also sang in her local Episcopal Church choir, was found in a vacant lot at the Spring Grove Cemetery, near Winton Place, by a street car conductor. Steinigewig's head had been bashed in with a club, her eyes wide open, some teeth missing, and her face was in a pool of blood. In her hand, she held a transfer ticket. A bloody trail indicated that her corpse had been dragged into the open field, apparently by a large man, as noted by the footprints left behind, which were from heavy boots.

The day before, Steinigewig left her office and was telephoned by her boyfriend, who offered to pick her up. However, Steinigewig replied that she had been to a dance and was tired, simply wanting to return home and lay down in bed. She was observed boarding the street car with a man, as told by conductor Frank Limie, who he claimed often rode alongside her. It is suspected that she had been attacked while waiting for another car at Winton and was clubbed from behind, not having enough time to react.

=== Assaults ===
During his initial 1904 murder spree, the killer also attacked several other women, who later gave descriptions of their attacker. After failing multiple times to kill another victim, the killer ceased activity for six years. The cases are the following:

- Miss Clausing - The daughter of gardener Henry Clausing, Miss Clausing was on her way to a party, and when she crossed a bridge near Elmore Street, a man jumped out of the darkness and snatched her purse. She was then hit with a hatchet on the head, and in her fall, struck the railroad tracks. Clausing was left lying there, until she was found by a group of men, who carried her to the nearby saloon. Immediately, two doctors, Alexander Pattie and R. H. Whallon, arrived on the scene, with Whallon performing the examination. She was later taken to the hospital and treated for two weeks by Dr. Whallon. Her parents wished for the case not to be disclosed by the doctor, until the murder of Steinigewig occurred.
- Mrs. Harry C. Winnes - On November 6, while her husband Harry was out to the pharmacy to buy some medicine, a loud knock was heard on the door at 11 PM. Mrs. Winnes opened the door, at the foot of which a short, thickly-built man asked for food. She declined, and the man pretended to leave but instead slipped by to the rear door of the house and hid behind it. Mrs. Winnes then went out to the backyard, failing to see him in time, and was then seized by his strong grip. She struggled hard, but only managed to let out one piercing scream. In the meantime, Harry Winnes had returned after changing his mind of going to the pharmacy and heard his wife scream. He dashed through the house to her aid but was heard by the assailant, who quickly fled. Although Mr. Winnes attempted to chase him down, shooting at him with his shotgun, the attacker escaped into the darkness.
- Dorothy Hannaford - The daughter of Samuel Hannaford, Dorothy had just left a meeting of the Young Women's Christian Association, returning to her Winton Place home. While waiting for the trolley car to arrive, not far from where Steinigewig was murdered on the same night, a short, rough-looking man jumped out of the bushes and grasped her arm. Hannaford began screaming and was just about to get dragged to the tracks when a trolley car approached, causing her assailant to flee immediately. As a result of her experience, Dorothy was taken ill but was otherwise unharmed.
- Mrs. Unkaback and Mrs. Hagerdorn - Only an hour after the Hannaford attack, the two neighbors of the family were attacked in a nearby area. Mrs. Unkaback's arm was seized by the attacker, but Mrs. Hagerdorn mustered all her strength and hit him in the mouth, making the man stagger back. Unkaback then joined her friend in beating him, forcing the perpetrator to flee.
- Weimer sisters and Mamie Roddie - On November 4, the day after Steinigewig's murder, the trio were attacked while passing by the Spring Grove Cemetery. A man appeared out of the graveyard's shadows and began hitting the girls, pinning one of them to the ground. However, he was outnumbered, with the would-be victims pulling his hair and aiming for his eyes the attacker was forced to flee, disappearing among the gravestones.
- Mrs. William Wergel, her mother and Mrs. Robert Kelley - While passing through the woods on the back of the Spring Grove Cemetery at night, the trio encountered the now-sought after Cumminsville Killer. The women screamed and rushed through a cornfield and back on the street, while the man went back into the woods.
- Mrs. Philip Gerbig - On November 17, Mrs. Gerbig was attacked near the location of Steinigewig's murder, on two separate occasions. To her luck, she managed to fight off the attacker both times and run back to her house.
- Josephine Hewitt - On November 22, while on her way back home late at night, Hewitt encountered a rough-looking man who emerged from within the Spring Grove Cemetery. He tried to grab her throat, but Hewitt came prepared, and after she hit him in the left eye, she pulled out a revolver. The assailant noticed the weapon and started running, with Hewitt firing until every chamber of the gun was empty. Not wanting to wait and find out if she had hit him, she ran home as fast as she could. Detectives investigated the attack but found no trace of the man.

=== Anna Lloyd ===
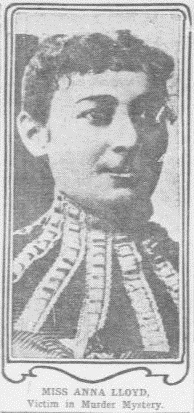
Picture of Anna Lloyd

On New Year's Eve, 1909, the body of the 36-year-old secretary for the Wilborgh-Hanna Lumber Co. was found near the railroad tracks in Cumminsville. Her mouth had been gagged, her throat cut, and her face beaten and bloodied, in the same way as the previous victims. According to police, within twenty minutes of leaving her workplace alone for the first time, Lloyd was waiting for a trolley car near the Spring Grove Cemetery when she was attacked. The assailant dragged her to a suitable spot, and after a great struggle with the physically strong Lloyd, the man managed to kill her, possibly with a meat cleaver used in butcher shops.

The following day, her body was found, either by two boys or by a male passer-by, who quickly contacted the police. Policemen later found Lloyd's satchel a mile away from the crime scene, with all the money gone. Emma Lloyd, her mother, was reported as very ill from the ordeal, while her husband, Edward Tague, insisted that police do better work in finding the culprit(s). The tensions around the murder got so high, that for some time authorities believed that there would be a race war.

As a response, the city council of Cincinnati announced a reward of $2,500, and members of the Lumber Company issued a reward of $5,000.

=== Mary Hackney ===
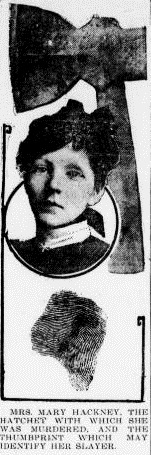
Picture of Mary Hackney, the murder weapon, and the killer's handprint

On October 26, 1910, the body of the 26-year-old Hackney, who had moved to the city with her husband Harley in 1906 from Louisville, Kentucky, was found in her Canal Ridge boarding house home by her spouse and one of the boarders, Charles Eckert. Her throat had been cut from ear to ear, her skull crushed, with her body and face slashed in several places, apparently with an axe. A search of the home revealed no other crime had been committed.

Despite the killer leaving behind the bloodied axe, as well as a bloody thumb mark on the door casing, police were unable to determine whose they were. In a last ditch effort, authorities drained a nearby canal in hope of possibly finding more evidence, but nothing turned up from this action.

== Suspects ==
According to all the women who survived the attacks, the Cumminsville Killer wore a dark slouch hat and was short and heavily built. However, the victims were unsure when it came to his race, as some claimed it was a white man, while others thought it was a black man.

On January 13, the police received a letter, in which the writer claimed to have witnessed Lloyd's murder and her killer. Police tried to contact the author, only listed as "S. D. M.", only to later learn that the claim was just a sick hoax.

=== Henry Cook, George Lewis, and James Fields ===
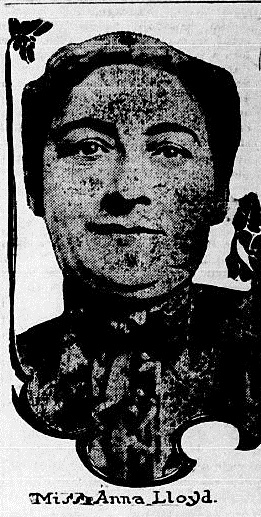
Alternative picture of Anna Lloyd

- Henry Cook (34) - a butcher by profession, was the prime suspect of the trio to have killed Lloyd, as two girls, one of them being 14-year-old Tillie Krebs, identified him as one of two men whom she had seen leaving the crime scene at the date of the murder. Soon after his arrest, Cook was taken before a magistrate and his bond fixed at $1,000. No newspaper reports at present exist of the outcome, but it is most likely that Cook was released due to lack of evidence.
- George Lewis (21) - a marine fireman, native of Cleveland, Lewis was arrested in Wyoming, Ohio, and was reportedly pretty vague about his whereabouts during Lloyd's murder. However, he was later released as authorities from Hamilton confirmed that he had been in prison at the time of the killing.
- James Fields (21) - the only black man arrested from the trio, Fields was held together with Cook for some time. It is unclear what exactly happened to him, but seemingly as police began suspecting that a white man had committed the murders, he was most likely released.

=== Harley Hackney, Charles Eckert, and Herman Schwering ===
- Harley W. Hackney - the husband of Mary Hackney. While returning home from work with the boarder Charles Eckert, the duo found Mary's body in the home. Both were arrested on suspicion, along with Herman Schwering, but as there was no evidence all were subsequently released. Hackney was about to move to Alabama, when he was given a witness subpoena by the coroner, forcing him to stay. Although an official inquest was started into his wife's murder, it was fruitless, and nothing came out of it.
- Charles Eckert - a young boarder in the Hackneys' house, Charles and Harley were returning home from their jobs at the lumber mill when they happened upon Mary's body. Eckert denied anything to do with the killing, and since no evidence was found against him, he was released.
- Herman Schwering - a black driver of a milk float, Schwering was arrested on suspicion along with Hackney and Eckert, but denied having anything to do with the murder. Like the others he was soon released for lack of evidence.

=== Dayton Strangler ===
At the time of Lloyd's murder, detectives made an effort to connect her murder to a similar series of killings, which occurred in the city of Dayton. Spanning from 1901 to 1909, five women were murdered in a manner reminiscent of the Cumminsville murders, and the fact that that killer also wasn't apprehended, led some to believe that the two murderers were the same person. Although a mentally unstable vendor named David Curtis confessed to the Dayton killings, nobody was arrested, and these murders also remain unsolved.

=== Unnamed black man ===
Several days after Lloyd's murder, a crazed black man, brandishing a bloody knife and shrieking, appeared on the door of David Taliaferro's home in Ford, Kentucky. The man screamed out that he had killed Anna Lloyd, and then ran off into the direction of Richmond. Frightened, Taliaferro phoned the authorities, with Sheriff Reed and a posse of men organizing to hunt the man down with a pack of bloodhounds. However, it is unclear what happened after.

=== Richard Finley ===
Shortly after the trio suspected of Hackney's murder were all released, police announced that they had arrested a 48-year-old black man named Richard Finley, who lived close to the Hackney home. He was placed under a charge "held pending investigation", but since no records of any other news exist about him, it is assumed he was released for lack of evidence.

== See also ==
- List of fugitives from justice who disappeared
- List of serial killers in the United States
