= George Walsh (cricketer) =

English cricketer

Personal information
- Full name: George Walsh
- Born: 16 February 1852; Over Darwen, Lancashire, England
- Died: 22 May 1904 (aged 52); Darwen, Lancashire, England

Domestic team information
- Years: Team
- 1875–1877: Lancashire

Career statistics
Competition	First-class
Matches	2
Runs scored	16
Batting average	5.33
100s/50s	0/0
Top score	15
Catches/stumpings	0/–
- Source: Cricinfo, 15 March 2015

George Walsh (16 February 1852 – 22 May 1904) was an English cricketer active in the mid-1870s. Born at Over Darwen, Lancashire, he made two appearances in first-class cricket.

The son of Nathaniel Walsh, an industrialist involved in the cotton industry in North East England, Walsh was educated at Queenwood College, Hampshire (where his classmate was A. N. Hornby), before moving to Rugby School. He played his club cricket for Darwen, Manchester and Nantwich, before making his debut in first-class cricket for Lancashire in 1875 against Derbyshire at Old Trafford. A second and final first-class appearance for Lancashire came in 1877 against Sussex, also at Old Trafford. Walsh scored a total of 16 runs across his two matches, with a top-score of 15. When fielding he would often field in the deep or at long stop.

Outside of playing cricket, Walsh continued the family business in the cotton industry at Ellenshaw Mill, Darwen. He suffered from indifferent health later in his life and had long retired from the family business prior to his death at Darwen, Lancashire on 22 May 1904.
