= Carlos J. Anderson =

American painter, illustrator and graphic designer

Carlos John Anderson
- Born: May 1, 1904; Midvale, Utah, U.S.
- Died: July 11, 1978 (aged 74); Salt Lake City, Utah, U.S.
- Education: Jordan High School; University of Utah
- Occupations: Painter, illustrator, graphic designer
- Spouse: Lucile Daily

Carlos J. Anderson (May 1, 1904 — July 11, 1978) was an American painter, illustrator and graphic designer. He did American Scene paintings of Utah pioneer buildings and scenery.

== Early life ==
Anderson was born on May 1, 1904, in Midvale, Utah. He grew up in Sandy, Utah and he graduated from Jordan High School. He attended the University of Utah from 1924 to 1927. He also studied at the Los Angeles Art Institute, the Art Students League of New York from 1930 to 1932, the Académie Julian from 1932 to 1933, and the École des Beaux-Arts.

== Career ==
Anderson became an American Scene painter in New York City in the 1930s. In 1934, he painted pioneer buildings and scenery for the U.S. government and the Utah State Historical Society. The paintings were acquired by the Utah Museum of Fine Arts, and reproduced on programs of the Utah Symphony and in the Junior League calendar. Anderson joined the San Francisco Civic Center Museum in 1948. He also worked for Abbott Laboratories, and he was also an illustrator for the Oakland Army Base.

His artwork was acquired by the Metropolitan Museum of Art, the Smithsonian American Art Museum, and the Springville Museum of Art.

== Personal life and death ==
Anderson married Lucile Daily in 1949, and she died in 1973. He died on July 11, 1978, in Salt Lake City, Utah.
