= July 1904 =

Month of 1904

<<	July 1904					>>
Su	Mo	Tu	We	Th	Fr	Sa
					1	2
3	4	5	6	7	8	9
10	11	12	13	14	15	16
17	18	19	20	21	22	23
24	25	26	27	28	29	30
31

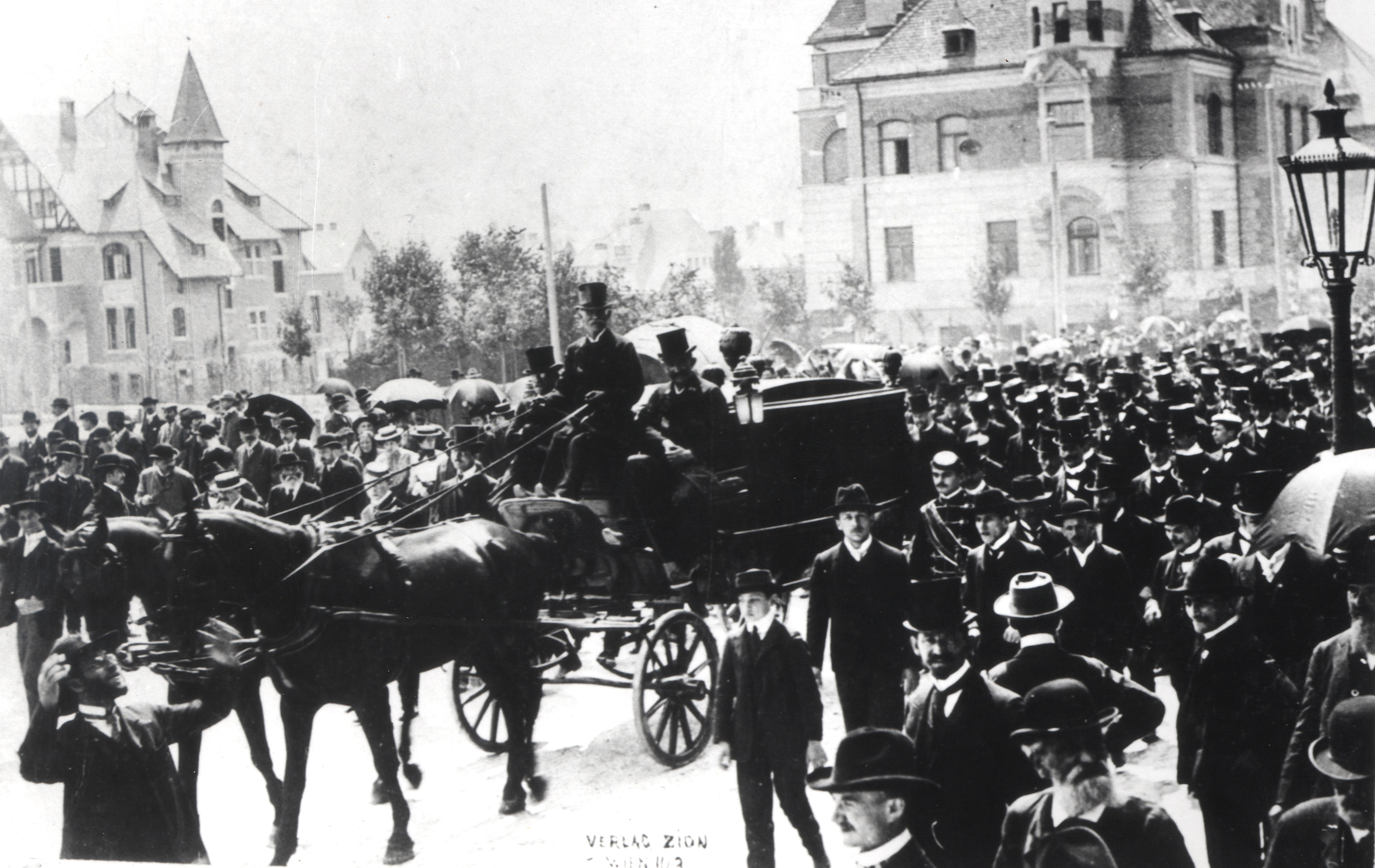
July 7, 1904: Funeral of Theodor Herzl in Vienna

The following events occurred in July 1904:

== July 1, 1904 (Friday) ==
- In Leverkusen, Germany, employees of the paint factories formerly known as Friedrich Bayer and Co. founded the Turn- und Spielverein der Farbenfabriken vorm. Friedr. Bayer & Co. in Leverkusen sports club, the predecessor of the Bayer 04 Leverkusen association football club.
- Captain G. H. Metcalf, a professional diver from Philadelphia, drowned after his diving helmet became displaced while working on deepening the channel of the Delaware River off Chester, Pennsylvania.
- The 1904 Summer Olympics, the third Modern Olympic Games, opened in St. Louis, Missouri, United States, as part of the Louisiana Purchase Exposition. David R. Francis, President of the Louisiana Purchase Exposition, officially opened the Games.
- Born:
  - Mary Calderone (born Mary Steichen), American physician, public health advocate; in New York City (d. 1998)
  - Gordon Gunson, English footballer; in Chester, England (d. 1991)
  - Renato Vernizzi, Italian painter; in Parma, Italy (d. 1972)
- Died:
  - Enrique Dupuy de Lôme, 52, Spanish ambassador to the United States, died of a cerebral hemorrhage.
  - George Frederic Watts, 87, British symbolist painter and sculptor, died of bronchitis.

== July 2, 1904 (Saturday) ==
- The 1904 Tour de France began in Paris.
- Born:
  - René Lacoste, French Olympic tennis player and businessman; in Paris, France (d. 1996)
  - Erik Lundin, Swedish chess master; in Stockholm, Sweden (d. 1988)
  - František Plánička, Czech footballer; in Prague, Austria-Hungary (d. 1996)
  - Frank Southall (born William Frank Southall), English Olympic racing cyclist; in Wandsworth, England (d. 1964)
  - Carl Weinrich, American organist; in Paterson, New Jersey (d. 1991)
- Died: Eugénie Joubert, 28, French Roman Catholic religious professed and blessed, died of tuberculosis.

== July 3, 1904 (Sunday) ==
- About 24 people died when fire consumed the engine and first three coaches of a Wabash Railroad train that struck a freight train in Litchfield, Illinois. Many of the train's passengers were delegates on their way to the 1904 Democratic National Convention in St. Louis.
- Canadian circus performer and giant Édouard Beaupré, 23, collapsed and died of a pulmonary haemorrhage due to tuberculosis during a show at the Louisiana Purchase Exposition.
- Born: Otto Gotsche, German political activist and writer; in Wolferode/Eisleben, Province of Saxony, Kingdom of Prussia, Germany (d. 1985)
- Died:
  - Theodor Herzl, 44, Austrian founder of Zionism, died of pneumonia due to cardiac sclerosis.
  - John Bell Hatcher, 42, American paleontologist, died of typhoid fever.
  - John O'Meara, 47–48, New Zealand Liberal Party Member of Parliament, died from an obstruction of blood on the brain which caused him to crash his bicycle.

== July 4, 1904 (Monday) ==
- Piero Ginori Conti tested the world's first geothermal power generator at the Larderello dry steam field in Italy. It was a small generator that lit four light bulbs.
- Tom Kiely of Ireland won the men's all-around championship at the Olympic Games in St. Louis, Missouri, with American athletes Adam Gunn and Truxton Hare in second and third place.
- Born:
  - Irène Aïtoff, French pianist and vocal coach; in Saint-Cast-le-Guildo, Côtes-du-Nord, France (d. 2006)
  - Angela Baddeley (born Madeleine Angela Clinton-Baddeley), English actress; in West Ham, Essex, England (d. 1976)
  - Rens Vis, Dutch Olympic footballer; in the Netherlands (d. 1993)
- Died:
  - Bódog Czorda, 75, Hungarian politician
  - Sir William Henry Rattigan, KC, 61, British Member of Parliament, was killed in a traffic collision.

== July 5, 1904 (Tuesday) ==
- In Scooba, Mississippi, Albert Rea, an African American man, was lynched for the alleged attempted rape of an 18-year-old woman.
- Lightning sparked a major fire in Charlestown, Boston, Massachusetts, which destroyed a grain elevator and three freight houses of the Boston and Maine Railroad, caused three deaths by drowning and resulted in over $1,000,000 in damage. The fatalities were sailors from the Allan Line steamship Austria, the crew of which jumped overboard when the fire spread to their vessel.
- Born:
  - Ernst Mayr, German-born biologist and author; in Kempten, Bavaria, Germany (d. 2005)
  - Harold Acton, British writer, scholar, and aesthete; at Villa La Pietra, near Florence, Italy (d. 1994)
  - Antonio Busini, Italian professional footballer and coach; in Padua, Kingdom of Italy (d. 1975) (some sources give date of birth as January 5, 1904)
  - Eugenia Clinchard, American child actress; in Alameda County, California (d. 1989)
  - Michael McLaverty, Irish novelist and short story writer; in Magheross (near Carrickmacross), County Monaghan, Ireland (d. 1992)
  - Stanford Robinson, English conductor and composer; in Leeds, England (d. 1984)
  - Franz Runge, Austrian footballer; in Klosterneuburg, Austria (d. 1975)
  - Milburn Stone, American actor; in Burrton, Kansas (d. 1980)
  - Franz Syberg, Danish composer; in Kerteminde, Funen, Denmark (d. 1955)
- Died:
  - Joseph Evans, 67, British-born Australian politician
  - Franz Martin Hilgendorf, 64, German zoologist and paleontologist, died of a gastric illness.
  - Amelia Robertson Hill, 83, Scottish artist and sculptor

== July 6, 1904 (Wednesday) ==
- British troops in Tibet stormed the Gyantse Dzong. British Indian Army officer John Duncan Grant would receive the Victoria Cross for his actions during the assault.

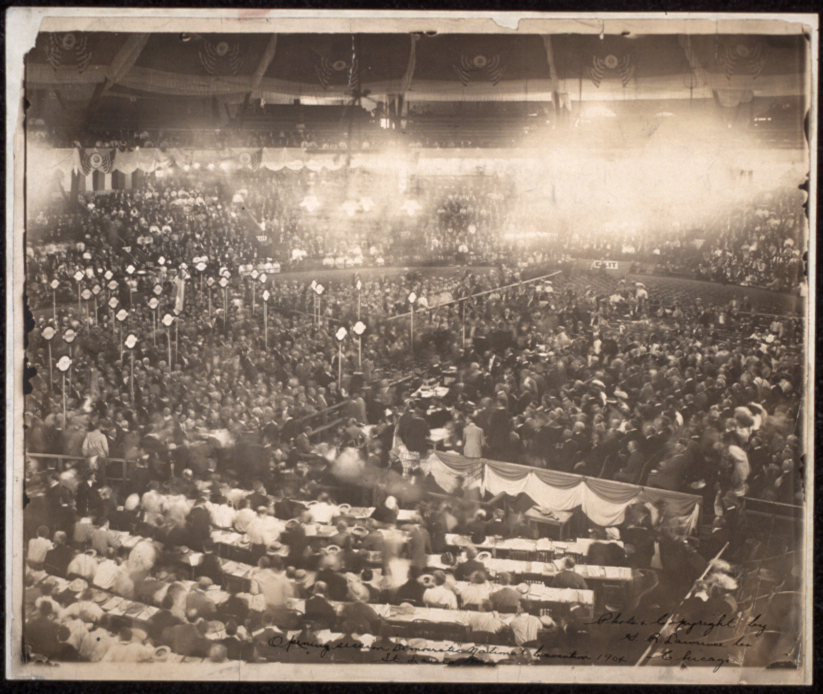
Opening session of the Democratic National Convention

- The 1904 Democratic National Convention opened in the Coliseum of the St. Louis Exposition and Music Hall in St. Louis, Missouri.
- In Clinton, Oklahoma Territory, a waterspout killed two women and three children.
- Born: Erik Wickberg, General of The Salvation Army; in Gävle, Sweden (d. 1996)
- Died:
  - Joseph Horace Lewis, 79, Confederate States Army brigadier general, member of the United States House of Representatives from Kentucky
  - Abai Qunanbaiuly, 58, Kazakh poet
  - Kandathil Varghese Mappillai, 46–47, Indian journalist, translator and publisher, editor of Malayala Manorama

== July 7, 1904 (Thursday) ==
- Large crowds of Jews from many countries attended Theodor Herzl's funeral in Vienna. 6000 people followed the hearse to Herzl's burial at the cemetery in Döbling. Herzl would be reinterred in 1949 on the hill in West Jerusalem now known as Mount Herzl.
- In France, the government of Émile Combes ratified the law of 7 July 1904, prohibiting religious congregations from teaching and strengthening the secularization of education.
- Born:
  - Nick Connor, American politician; in Gadsden, Alabama (d. 1995)
  - Manuela de Jesús Arias Espinosa, Mexican Roman Catholic religious professed and blessed; in Ixtlán del Río, Nayarit, Mexico (d. 1981)
- Died:
  - Adolph Friedländer, 53, German lithographer
  - Charles Page Thomas Moore, 73, American lawyer and judge

== July 8, 1904 (Friday) ==
- Born:
  - Vladimir Belokurov, Russian and Soviet actor and pedagogue; in Nizhny Uslon, Sviyazhsky Uyezd, Kazan Governorate, Russian Empire (d. 1973)
  - Henri Cartan, French mathematician; in Nancy, France (d. 2008)
  - Bill Challis, American jazz arranger; in Wilkes-Barre, Pennsylvania (d. 1994)
  - Roger Motz, Belgian mining engineer and politician; in Schaerbeek, Belgium (d. 1964)
- Died: Joseph Blanc, 58, French painter

== July 9, 1904 (Saturday) ==
- OGC Nice was founded as the Gymnaste Club de Nice in Nice, France.
- Pitcher Hiram Williamson of the Providence, Maryland, baseball team was struck in the head by a pitch while at bat in a game at Cherry Hill, Maryland. He would die of his injuries on July 11 at the age of 23.
- Born:
  - Carlota Jaramillo (born María Isabel Carlota Jaramillo), Ecuadorian pasillo singer; in Calacalí, Pichincha Province, Ecuador (d. 1987, cerebral trauma after fall)
  - Heinz Jost, German SS official and Holocaust perpetrator; in Homberg-Holzhausen, German Empire (d. 1964)
  - Ernst Küppers, German Olympic backstroke swimmer; in Viersen, North Rhine-Westphalia, Germany (d. 1976)
  - Hideo Oguni, Japanese screenwriter; in Hachinohe, Aomori Prefecture (d. 1996)
  - Otto Wahl, German Olympic cross-country skier; in Zella-Mehlis, Thuringia, Germany (d. 1935, brain disease)
  - Robert Whitney, American composer and conductor; in Newcastle upon Tyne, Tyne and Wear, England (d. 1986)
- Died: Bersan, 21–22, American Thoroughbred Champion racehorse

== July 10, 1904 (Sunday) ==
- The 1904 Democratic National Convention adjourned at 1:30 a.m., having nominated Judge Alton B. Parker of New York for President of the United States and Henry Gassaway Davis of West Virginia for Vice President.
- In Houston, Mississippi, Jesse Tucker, an African American man, was lynched before daybreak for an alleged assault on a white woman the previous night. The same morning, the coroner's jury delivered their verdict on Tucker's death while standing on the railroad bridge from which his body hung: "We, the jury, find that the deceased, Jesse Tucker, came to his death by hanging at the hands of unknown parties."
- Sixteen residents of Hoboken, Jersey City and New York City were killed, and about 50 injured, when a passenger train collided with their excursion train in Midvale, New Jersey.
- Born:
  - Haim Ben-Asher (born Haim Finkel), Israeli politician; in Odessa, Russia (d. 1998)
  - Jules Herremans, Belgian Olympic javelin thrower (d. 1974)
  - Iša Krejčí, Czech neoclassical composer, conductor and dramaturge; in Prague, Austria-Hungary (d. 1968)
  - Tom Tippett, English footballer; in Gateshead, Tyne and Wear, England (d. 1997)
- Died: José Toral y Velázquez, 71, Spanish Army general

== July 11, 1904 (Monday) ==
- The inaugural Mount Washington Hillclimb Auto Race began at Mount Washington, New Hampshire, and would conclude on July 12.
- Born:
  - Helmut Grunsky, German mathematician; in Aalen, Kingdom of Württemberg, Germany (d. 1986)
  - Leland John Haworth, American particle physicist; in Flint, Michigan (d. 1979)
- Died:
  - Frederic Dan Huntington, 85, American clergyman, bishop of the Episcopal Diocese of Central New York. Huntington's son, George P. Huntington, a professor of Hebrew, died of slow fever on the same day.

== July 12, 1904 (Tuesday) ==
- John Sinclair, a British Member of Parliament, married Lady Marjorie Gordon in London. Randall Davidson, the Archbishop of Canterbury, officiated at the wedding ceremony.
- American author Samuel Langhorne Clemens (Mark Twain) and his daughters arrived in New York City with the body of Clemens' wife, Olivia Langdon Clemens, who had died in Italy on June 5.
- Born:
  - Pablo Neruda, Chilean poet, Nobel Prize laureate; in Parral, Chile (d. 1973)
  - Pinhas Lavon, Israeli politician; in Kopychyntsi, Kingdom of Galicia and Lodomeria, Austria-Hungary (d. 1976)
  - Edward Max Nicholson, English ornithologist and environmentalist; in Kilternan, Ireland (d. 2003)
  - Boris Rohdendorf, Soviet entomologist and curator (d. 1977)
- Died:
  - Samuel M. Jones, 57, Welsh-born Mayor of Toledo, Ohio, died of a lung abscess caused by asthma.
  - Hendrik Dirk Kruseman van Elten, 74, Dutch artist

== July 13, 1904 (Wednesday) ==
- Jockey George Green fractured his skull in a fall on the track at Brighton Beach, Brooklyn. He would die of his injuries on July 17.
- The National Association of Colored Women met for its second session in a church in downtown St. Louis. The meeting had been scheduled to take place on the World's Fair grounds but was moved in accordance with a resolution introduced by Margaret Murray Washington, who objected to discrimination against African Americans by exposition officials.
- Twenty-two people returning to Chicago from a Sunday school picnic were killed when their passenger train collided with a freight train on the Chicago and Eastern Illinois Railroad between Chicago Heights and Glenwood, Illinois.
- Born:
  - Jim Burrows, New Zealand teacher, sportsman, administrator, and military leader; in Prebbleton, New Zealand (d. 1991)
  - Luigi Capuano, Italian film director and screenwriter; in Naples, Italy (d. 1979)
  - Robert Minton, American Olympic bobsledder and stockbroker; in Lawrence, Nassau County, New York (d. 1974)
- Died: Lemuel Moss, 74, American theologian, president of Indiana University

== July 14, 1904 (Thursday) ==
- The funeral and burial of Olivia Langdon Clemens took place in Elmira, New York.
- University of Michigan athlete Ralph Rose set an unofficial world record of 190 feet 0.5 inches (57.925 m) in the hammer throw.
- Born:
  - Richard Clarkson, British aeronautical engineer; in London, England (d. 1996)
  - František Donth, Czechoslovak Olympic cross-country skier and lumberjack; in Rokytnice nad Jizerou, Austria-Hungary (d. 1976)
  - Hans Bernd Gisevius, German diplomat and intelligence officer, covert opponent of Nazi regime; in Arnsberg, Province of Westphalia, Kingdom of Prussia (d. 1974)
  - Hans von Herwarth, German diplomat and author; in Berlin, Germany (d. 1999)
  - Zita Johann (born Elisabeth Johann), Austrian-American actress; in Deutschbentschek (near Temesvar), Austria-Hungary (d. 1993)
  - Louis Rapkine, French biologist; in Tikhinichi, Belarus, Russian Empire (d. 1948, lung cancer)
  - Nadia Reisenberg, Lithuanian-born American pianist and music educator; in Vilnius, Lithuania (d. 1983)
  - Josef Straka, Czechoslovak Olympic rower; in Mělník, Austria-Hungary (d. 1976)
- Died: Paul Kruger, 78, South African military and political figure, 3rd President of South Africa, died of senile pneumonia due to sclosis of the arteries.

== July 15, 1904 (Friday) ==
- Born:
  - Rudolf Arnheim, German-born author, film theorist and perceptual psychologist; in Berlin, Germany (d. 2007)
  - Dorothy Fields, American librettist; in Allenhurst, New Jersey (d. 1974)
  - Katharine Kuh (born Katharine Woolf), American art historian; in St. Louis, Missouri (d. 1994)
  - Mogubai Kurdikar, Hindustani classical vocalist; in Curdi, Goa (d. 2001)
- Died: Anton Chekhov, 44, Russian writer, died of tuberculosis.

== July 16, 1904 (Saturday) ==
- In the early morning, laborer Thomas Snowden discovered the body of Frederick Kent Loomis washed up at Thurleston Sands, Bigbury Bay, Kingsbridge, Devon. Loomis had disappeared from the liner Kaiser Wilhelm II on the eve of its arrival in Plymouth, England on June 20. The body had an abrasion under the right ear. There were no important papers on the body.

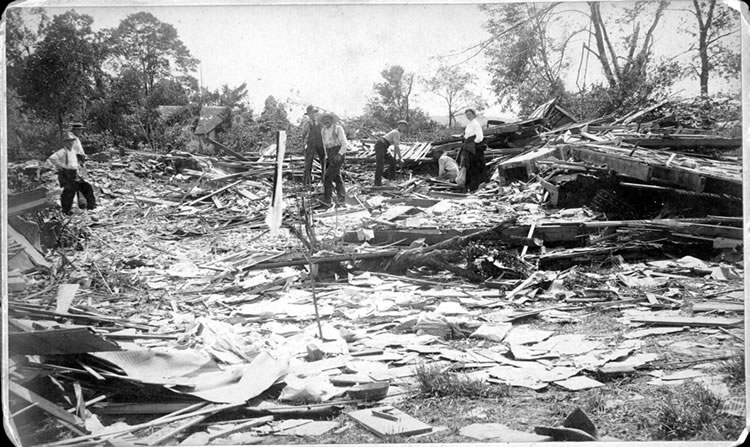
July 17, 1904: Damage from the Chappaqua tornado

- The 1904 Chappaqua tornado struck northern Westchester County, New York, killing two people and injuring six.
- In Valparaíso, Chile, a storm caused extensive damage and drowned seven women in their homes.
- Born:
  - Goffredo Petrassi, Italian composer and conductor; in Zagarolo, Italy (d. 2003)
  - Geraldine Knight Scott (born Geraldine Knight), pioneering American woman landscape architect; in Wallace, Idaho (d. 1989)
  - Leo Joseph Suenens, Belgian Roman Catholic prelate, Archbishop of Brussels-Mechelen; in Ixelles, Belgium (d. 1996)

== July 17, 1904 (Sunday) ==
- Born:
  - Clyde Smith, National Football League center and college football coach; in Steelville, Missouri (d. 1982)
- Died:
  - Wilhelm Marr, 84, German agitator and journalist, popularizer of the term "antisemitism"
  - Alfred Moore, 78, English civil engineer
  - Charles Morgan, 65, English cricketer
  - Isaac Roberts FRS, 75, Welsh astronomer

== July 18, 1904 (Monday) ==
- The inquest into the death of Frederick Kent Loomis was held in the village of Thurleston, Devonshire. Doctors concluded that Loomis had received an antemortem blow to the head sufficient to cause death before entering the water. The verdict of the coroner's jury read, "Found dead, washed up by the sea in Bigbury Bay, Devonshire." In advising the verdict, Coroner Dr. Sidney Hacker stated that there was no evidence that the blow to Loomis' head was the result of foul play.
- In Longville, California, a fire destroyed the Miller Hotel, killing two children on an upper floor, who were believed to have set the fire.
- E. C. Hutchinson and J. S. Hutchinson made the first ascent of Mount Humphreys, located in the Sierra Nevada in California.
- Born:
  - Vittorio Metz, Italian screenwriter and film director; in Rome, Italy (d. 1984)
  - Stella Skopal, Croatian Jewish sculptor; in Zagreb, Kingdom of Croatia-Slavonia, Austria-Hungary (d. 1992)
  - Fuji Yahiro, Japanese screenwriter; in Fukuoka Prefecture, Japan (d. 1986)
  - Arne Yven, Norwegian footballer; in Sarpsborg, Norway (d. 1970)

== July 19, 1904 (Tuesday) ==
- In St. Louis, lightning struck the Mexican pavilion at the World's Fair, causing $3000 in damage.
- In Susanville, California, a fire destroyed the Humphrey Hotel, killing two children who were asleep on the second floor.
- Born:
  - William Alexander Smith, South African Olympic and world champion bantamweight boxer; in Johannesburg, South Africa (d. 1955, heart attack) (some sources give date of birth as August 5, 1905, and place of birth as Krugersdorp, South Africa)
  - Mark Koenig, American Major League Baseball shortstop; in San Francisco, California (d. 1993, cancer)
  - Vera Schmiterlöw, Swedish actress; in Varberg, Halland County, Sweden (d. 1987)
- Died: Herbert Campbell, 59, English actor, died of a brain haemorrhage.

== July 20, 1904 (Wednesday) ==
- Born:
  - René Couzinet, French aeronautics engineer and aircraft manufacturer; in Saint-Martin-des-Noyers, Vendée, France (d. 1956, murder-suicide)
  - Molly Keane (born Mary Nesta Skrine), Irish novelist and playwright; in Newbridge, County Kildare, Ireland (d. 1996)
- Died:
  - John R. McBride, 71, American lawyer and politician, member of the United States House of Representatives from Oregon, died of a brain hemorrhage.
  - William G. Thompson, 61, Union Army officer, lawyer and politician, Mayor of Detroit, died of injuries from a pedestrian accident.

== July 21, 1904 (Thursday) ==
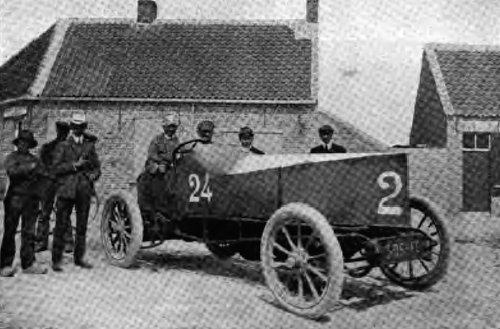
Rigolly in record-setting car

- French driver Louis Rigolly set a new world land speed record of 103.56 miles per hour (166.66 km/h) (the first time the record exceeded 100 miles per hour (160 km/h)), driving a Gobron-Brillié racing car in Ostend, Belgium.
- In New York City, a grand larceny charge against boxer Bob Fitzsimmons for stealing a lion cub from a Coney Island animal show was dismissed. One of the show's managers had told Fitzsimmons he could have the lion as a joke. Fitzsimmons returned the lion to the show.
- The armored cruiser USS South Dakota (ACR-9) was launched from the Union Iron Works in San Francisco, sponsored by Grace Mae Herreid, daughter of Charles N. Herreid, the Governor of South Dakota.
- Born:
  - Mario Agosti, Italian javelin thrower and footballer; in Udine, Italy (d. 1992)
  - Fernand Fayolle, French racing cyclist; in La Motte-d'Aveillans, Rhône-Alpes, France (d. 1997)
  - Jean-Marie Gantois, French Roman Catholic priest and Flemish nationalist; in Watten, Nord, France (d. 1968)
  - James Gentle, American soccer player, Olympic field hockey player, golfer and United States Army colonel; in Dorchester, Massachusetts (d. 1986)
  - Wilhelm Harster, German officer and Holocaust perpetrator; in Kelheim, Kingdom of Bavaria, German Empire (d. 1991)
  - Henry Johansen, Norwegian Olympic and professional footballer; in Kristiania, Norway (d. 1988)
  - Louis Meyer, American Hall of Fame race car driver; in Manhattan, New York City (d. 1995)

== July 22, 1904 (Friday) ==
- Six people were injured in a scenic railway accident at the Louisiana Purchase Exposition.
- In Bakersfield, California, Superior Judge Mahon sentenced James Cowan, who had been convicted of manslaughter for the March 11 lynching of James Cummings in Mojave, California, to eight years at Folsom State Prison. The jury which convicted Cowan recommended him to the mercy of the court. Judge Mahon expressed the opinion that the jury did not have the right to make such a recommendation and said that, without it, he would have sentenced Cowan to death.
- Born:
  - Donald O. Hebb, Canadian psychologist; in Chester, Nova Scotia, Canada (d. 1985)
  - Peter Igelhoff (born Rudolf August Ordnung), Austrian pianist and light music and film composer; in Vienna, Austria (d. 1978)
  - Marjorie White (born Marjorie Ann Guthrie), Canadian-born stage and film actress; in Winnipeg, Manitoba, Canada (d. 1935, injuries from traffic collision)
- Died:
  - Wilson Barrett, 58, English actor and playwright, died of heart failure after an operation for cancer.
  - Charles Seaforth Stewart, 81, U.S. Army Corps of Engineers colonel, died from an accidental fall.

== July 23, 1904 (Saturday) ==
- The French man-of-war Mars, being used as an accommodation hulk for 200 marines in Toulon harbor, sank due to rats gnawing holes in its floats. All aboard evacuated before the ship sank.
- Engineer David Roberts of Richard Hornsby & Sons of Grantham in England patented a continuous track tractor.
- Born: Georges Hugon, French composer; in Paris, France (d. 1980)
- Died:
  - Rodolfo Amando Philippi, 95, German–born Chilean paleontologist and zoologist, died of pneumonia.
  - John Douglas CMG, 76, British-born Australian politician
  - Isaías Gamboa, 31, Colombian poet
  - Sir John Simon KCB FRS FRCS, 87, English pathologist.

== July 24, 1904 (Sunday) ==
- The 1904 Tour de France ended at the Parc des Princes in Paris, with French cyclist Maurice Garin apparently defending his 1903 title. On November 30, the Union Vélocipédique Française would disqualify the first four finishers, awarding the victory to French cyclist Henri Cornet. 19 years old at the time of the race, Cornet remains the Tour de France's youngest winner.
- St Patrick's Cathedral in Armagh, Ireland, was solemnly consecrated and reopened after the completion of its interior adornment, planned and overseen by Cardinal Michael Logue. Cardinal Vincenzo Vannutelli represented Pope Pius X at the ceremony.
- The body of paleontologist and zoologist Rodolfo Amando Philippi lay in state in the grand hall of the University of Chile, viewed by 10,000 people.
- Born:
  - Leo Arnaud, French American film composer; in Couzon-au-Mont-d'Or, Lyon, Rhône, France (d. 1991)
  - Willi Boltze, German Olympic long-distance runner; in Hamburg, Germany (d. 1937, suicide)
  - Delmer Daves, American screenwriter, film director and film producer; in San Francisco, California (d. 1977)
  - Anton Dolin (born Sydney Francis Patrick Chippendall Healey-Kay), English ballet dancer and choreographer; in Slinfold, West Sussex, England (d. 1983)
  - Miotero Geninetti, Italian World War II partisan; in Grenoble, France (d. 1945, shot)
  - Harry Hasso, Swedish actor, cinematographer and film director; in Frankenthal, Germany (d. 1984)
  - Nikolai Kuznetsov, Soviet admiral; in Medvedki, Velikoustyuzhsky Uyezd, Vologda Governorate, Russian Empire (d. 1974)
- Died:
  - Laura Bon, 78, Italian stage actress, died of heart disease.
  - George Moore, 66–67, Union Navy sailor, Medal of Honor recipient, died of lung congestion.
  - Charles Robert Wilson, 41, English academic and historian

== July 25, 1904 (Monday) ==
- In Santiago, Chile, 30,000 people observed the funeral procession of paleontologist Rodolfo Amando Philippi, which included the entire cabinet and National Congress. According to researchers Alan R. Kabat and Eugene V. Coan, "It is safe to say that no other zoologist or paleontologist had such a large turnout at his funeral," with the possible exception of Alexander von Humboldt in 1859.
- Inventor Louis N. Filion demonstrated a rigid airship behind the field of the Shamrock Lacrosse Club in Montreal, Quebec. This was the first flight of an airship in Canada.
- Born:
  - Tore Edman, Swedish ski jumper; in Arvika, Sweden (d. 1995)
  - Ernest Hilgard, American psychologist; in Belleville, Illinois (d. 2001)
- Died:
  - Kate Lee (born Catharine Anna Spooner), 45, English singer and folksong collector, died of cancer.
  - Jim Valentine, 37, English rugby union and rugby league player, was killed by a lightning strike.

== July 26, 1904 (Tuesday) ==
- Colorado Governor James Hamilton Peabody issued a proclamation terminating martial law in Teller County.
- Born:
  - Edwin Albert Link, American pioneer in aviation, underwater archaeology, and submersibles, inventor of aeronautical, navigation, and oceanographic equipment; in Huntington, Indiana (d. 1981)
  - Leigh Jason, American film director and screenwriter; in New York City (d. 1979)
  - Bjarne Larsen, Norwegian footballer (d. 1972)
  - Marino Ortolani, Italian pediatrician; in Altedo, Malalbergo, Province of Bologna, Italy (d. 1983)
  - Luis Vidales, Colombian poet; in Calarcá, Quindío Department, Colombia (d. 1990)
- Died:
  - John Rogers, 74, American sculptor, died of creeping paralysis.
  - Henry Clay Taylor, 59, United States Navy rear admiral, died of peritonitis.

== July 27, 1904 (Wednesday) ==
- Born:
  - Kenneth Bainbridge, American physicist; in Cooperstown, New York (d. 1996)
  - Arthur Christiansen, British journalist and editor; in Wallasey, Cheshire, England (d. 1963)
  - Oskar R. Lange, Polish economist and diplomat; in Tomaszów Mazowiecki, Congress Poland (d. 1965)
  - Lyudmila Rudenko, Soviet chess player, women's world chess champion; in Lubny, Poltava Governorate, Russian Empire (d. 1986)
  - Omer Taverne, Belgian professional road bicycle racer; in Waudrez, Binche, Hainaut Province, Belgium (d. 1981)
- Died: John Francis Holme, 36, American newspaper artist and book printer, died of tuberculosis.

== July 28, 1904 (Thursday) ==
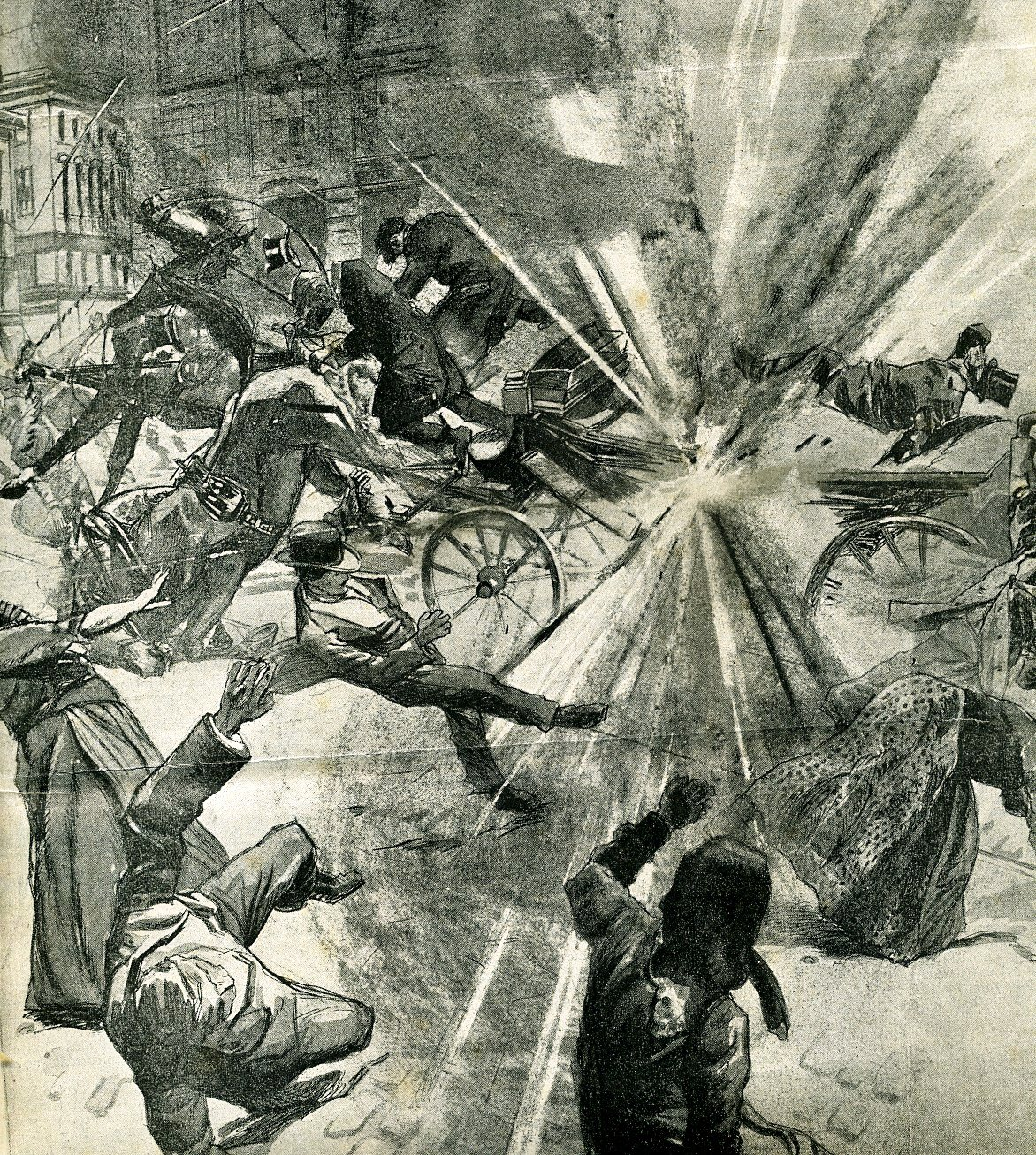
Assassination of Vyacheslav von Plehve

- Igor Sazonov, a member of the SR Combat Organization, the terrorist branch of the Socialist Revolutionary Party, assassinated Vyacheslav von Plehve, Minister of the Interior of Russia, in Saint Petersburg. As von Plehve drove to the railway station to report to Czar Nicholas II at the Peterhof Palace, Sazonov threw a bomb under von Plehve's carriage, completely destroying it and killing or injuring over 20 people.
- Empress Alexandra was not informed of von Plehve's assassination due to the imminence of her childbirth. She would give birth to Alexei Nikolaevich, Tsarevich of Russia, on August 12.
- On hearing of von Plehve's assassination, Pope Pius X reportedly threw his hands in the air and exclaimed, "How awful. Let us hope that worse events than war are not impending in Russia."
- Born:
  - Pavel Cherenkov, Soviet physicist, Nobel Prize laureate; in Novaya Chigla, Russia (d. 1990)
  - Elyesa Bazna, World War II secret agent for Nazi Germany; in Pristina, Kosovo vilayet, Ottoman Empire (d. 1970, kidney disease)
  - Piero Toscani, Italian Olympic champion middleweight boxer; in Milan, Province of Milan, Italy (d. 1940)
- Died: Dexter Horton, 78, American banker, died of heart failure.

== July 29, 1904 (Friday) ==
- The 1. FC Normannia Gmünd association football club was founded in Gmünd, Germany, by the merger of the Alemannia and Fortuna clubs.
- The United Russian Revolutionists held a mass meeting at the Cooper Union in New York City to celebrate Vyacheslav von Plehve's death. 5000 people were in attendance.
- Born:
  - Ricardo Balbín, Argentine lawyer and politician; in Buenos Aires, Argentina (d. 1981)
  - Chen Boda, Chinese Communist journalist, professor and political theorist; in Hui'an County, Fujian, Qing China (d. 1989)
  - Clara Horton, American silent film actress; in Brooklyn, New York City (d. 1976)
  - J. R. D. Tata, Indian aviator and businessman; in Paris, France (d. 1993, kidney infection)

== July 30, 1904 (Saturday) ==
- France severed diplomatic relations with the Holy See following the Vatican's sanctioning of two French bishops.
- Died: Richard A. Harrison, 80, English-born member of the United States House of Representatives from Ohio

== July 31, 1904 (Sunday) ==
- A lion attacked animal tamer Captain Jack Bonavita, causing injuries that would lead to the amputation of his left arm. According to conflicting historical accounts, the incident occurred either at the Moulin Rouge in Paris or on Coney Island.
- Born:
  - John Carberry, American Roman Catholic prelate, Archbishop of St. Louis; in Brooklyn, New York City (d. 1998)
  - Harold Davies, Baron Davies of Leek, British Labour Party politician; in Glamorgan, Wales (d. 1985)
  - Brett Halliday (pseudonym for Davis Dresser), American mystery and Western writer; in Chicago, Illinois (d. 1977)
  - Tex Palmer (born Luther W. Palmer), American actor; in Xenia, Ohio (d. 1982)
- Died:
  - Fyodor Eduardovich Keller, 53, Imperial Russian Army general, was killed in action.
  - Marcus H. Barnum, 70, American lawyer, businessman and politician, member of the Wisconsin State Assembly
