= June 1904 =

Month of 1904

<<	June 1904					>>
Su	Mo	Tu	We	Th	Fr	Sa
			1	2	3	4
5	6	7	8	9	10	11
12	13	14	15	16	17	18
19	20	21	22	23	24	25
26	27	28	29	30

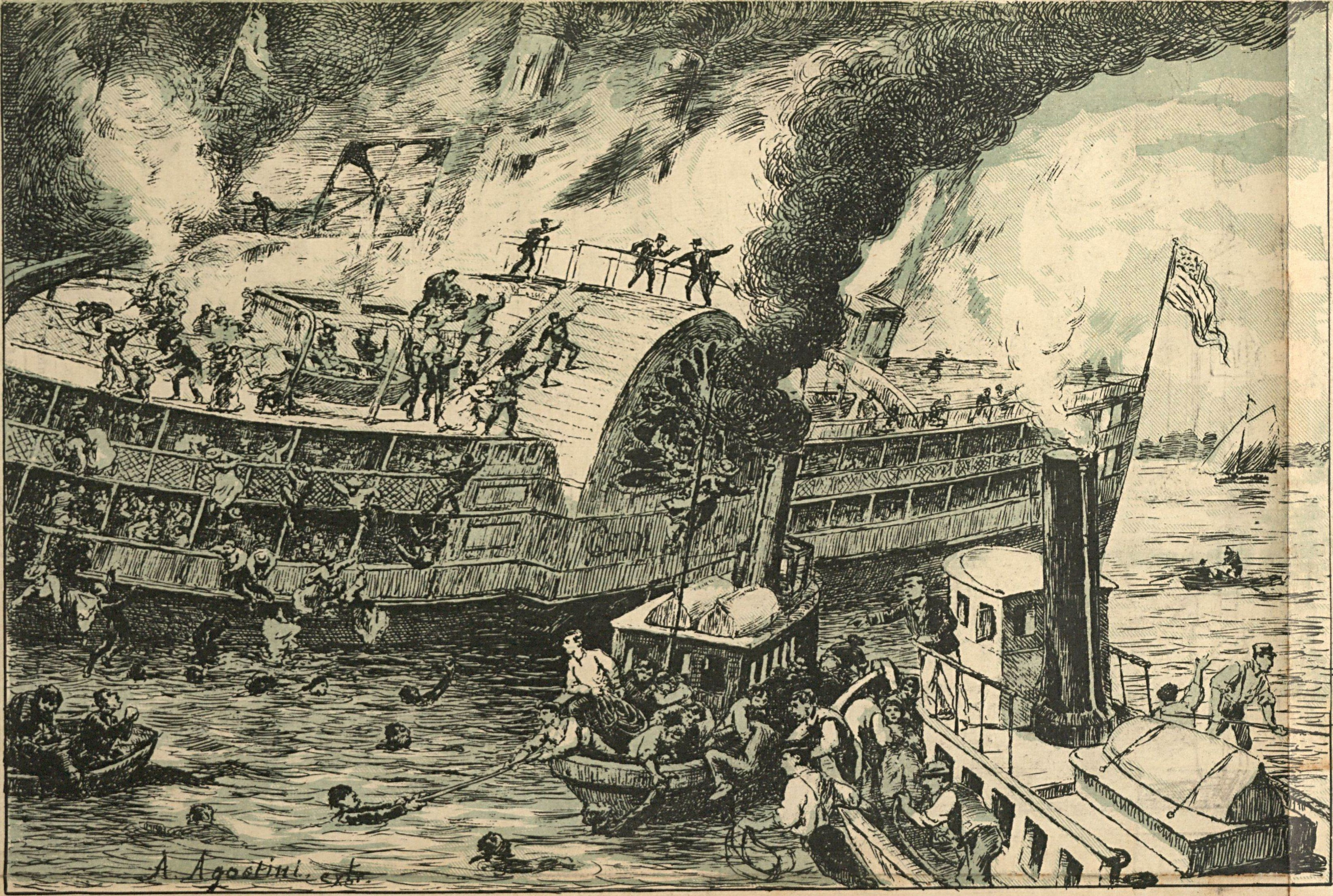
June 15, 1904: Fire aboard the PS General Slocum

The following events occurred in June 1904:

== June 1, 1904 (Wednesday) ==
- Born: Ineko Sata, Japanese writer; in Nagasaki, Japan (d. 1998)
- Died:
  - Samuel R. Callaway, 53, Canadian-born American railroad executive, died after an operation for mastoiditis.
  - Hannibal C. Carter, 69, Union Army officer, Secretary of State of Mississippi
  - Ivan Kondratyev, 54, Russian writer

== June 2, 1904 (Thursday) ==
- The nave of St Anne's Cathedral, Belfast, the first part of the Church of Ireland cathedral to be built, was consecrated.
- Six people were killed in a collision on the Lake Shore Electric Railway east of Norwalk, Ohio.
- Born:
  - Johnny Weissmuller (born Johann Peter Weißmüller), American Olympic champion swimmer and actor (Tarzan); in Freidorf, Austria-Hungary (d. 1984, pulmonary edema)
  - Frank Runacres, English painter (d. 1974)
- Died: Harrison Fuller, 58, American politician and farmer, member of the New York State Assembly, died after a buggy accident.

== June 3, 1904 (Friday) ==
- The International Alliance of Women was founded during the Second Conference of the International Woman Suffrage Alliance in Berlin, Germany.
- In Washington, D.C., the U.S. Department of War announced the names of cadets who would enter the United States Military Academy at West Point in June 1904. Among them were George S. Patton, the future World War II U.S. Army general, son of businessman and politician George S. Patton of San Gabriel, California; Earl J. Atkisson, a U.S. Army colonel in World War I; Charles Hartwell Bonesteel Jr., a World War II major general; and Simon Bolivar Buckner Jr., the World War II lieutenant general who would be killed in action at the Battle of Okinawa.
- Born:
  - Charles R. Drew, American surgeon, pioneer in blood transfusion; in Washington, D.C. (d. 1950, traffic collision)
  - Jan Peerce (born Jacob Pincus Perelmuth), American tenor; in Manhattan, New York City (d. 1984)
- Died:
  - John Hopley, 83, British-American attorney and newspaper editor
  - Robert Porter Keep, 60, American scholar
  - William Keyser, 68, American railroad executive, died of apoplexy.
  - Samuel H. Pine, 76, American ship designer and builder, died of cystitis.
  - Vincent Tancred, 28, South African cricketer, died from a multiple gunshot suicide.

== June 4, 1904 (Saturday) ==
- While riding in a hansom cab on his way to New York City's White Star Line pier to join his wife, with whom he was about to sail to Europe, bookmaker and horse owner Frank Thomas "Caesar" Young died of a gunshot wound. Former actress Nan Patterson, who was in the cab with Young, was arrested on suspicion of his murder, although she claimed the pistol shot was self-inflicted.
- Also in New York City, police reserves used force to disperse a crowd of African Americans blocking Central Park West outside the home of Hannah Elias, whose house was surrounded by deputies waiting to serve her with legal papers related to manufacturer John R. Platt's charges of blackmail against her.
- U.S. President Theodore Roosevelt joined the United Spanish War Veterans.
- In Fairmont, West Virginia, a gas explosion at a coal company killed four people and injured four others.
- In Peoria, Illinois, an explosion and fire destroyed the Corning Distilling warehouse and spread to nearby stockyards, killing 14 people and 3200 cattle and causing at least $1,000,000 in damage.
- A tornado in Oklahoma Territory and Indian Territory destroyed the towns of Chattanooga, Faxon, and Hulen, killing at least one person.
- In Hercules, California, an explosion and fire at the California Powder Works killed five people. The following day, the Los Angeles Herald's report of the disaster would be headlined, "HERCULES POWDER MILLS DESTROYED Two Lives Lost and $30,000 in Property", but the text of the article would state, "...two white men and three Chinese were killed and several persons injured."
- Born:
  - Henri Grob, Swiss chess player (d. 1974)
  - Jack Lauterwasser, English Olympic racing cyclist; in City of London, England (d. 2003)
  - Raymond Rouleau, Belgian actor and film director; in Brussels, Belgium (d. 1981)
  - Bhagat Puran Singh, Indian environmentalist and philanthropist; in Rajewal, Ludhiana district, Punjab (d. 1992)
- Died:
  - Princess Marie of Hanover, 54, died of appendicitis.
  - George Frederick Phillips, 42, Canadian-born United States Navy sailor and Medal of Honor recipient, died of Bright's disease.
  - Thomas H. Howard, 41, American clubman

== June 5, 1904 (Sunday) ==
- The Philadelphia and Reading Coal Company barge Lorberry sank after colliding in fog with the steamer Tallahassee off the Vineyard Sound Lightship in Massachusetts. Captain Burrows of the Lorberry drowned.
- A series of bullfights was scheduled to begin at 2 p.m. in the Norris Amusement Company amphitheater north of the Louisiana Purchase Exposition grounds in St. Louis, Missouri. Authorities prevented the event from taking place due to complaints from supporters of animal rights, but the event's organizers refused to give refunds to the 8,000 people who had bought tickets. This led to a riot during which the crowd attacked the amusement company's office, brought the bulls into the amphitheater and conducted a bullfight themselves. The crowd then freed the seven bulls and eight horses present for the bullfight and set fire to the amphitheater, completely destroying it and forcing the bullfighters, who had been eating in rooms under the stands, to flee.
- The brothers Christian and Hans Kaufmann guided John Duncan Patterson on the first ascent of Mount Ball in the Canadian Rockies.
- Born:
  - Edith Clark (born Édith Georgette Valentine Boiteux), French aviator and parachutist; in Cuffy, Cher, France (d. 1937, parachuting accident)
  - Hans Furler, German politician; in Lahr, German Empire (d. 1975)
  - Derrick Kennedy, Irish cricketer; in Dublin, Ireland (d. 1976)
- Died:
  - Olivia Langdon Clemens (born Olivia Iona Louise Langdon), 58, wife of Mark Twain, died of heart failure.
  - Mervyn Wingfield, 7th Viscount Powerscourt KP PC (Ire), 67, Irish peer and art collector

== June 6, 1904 (Monday) ==
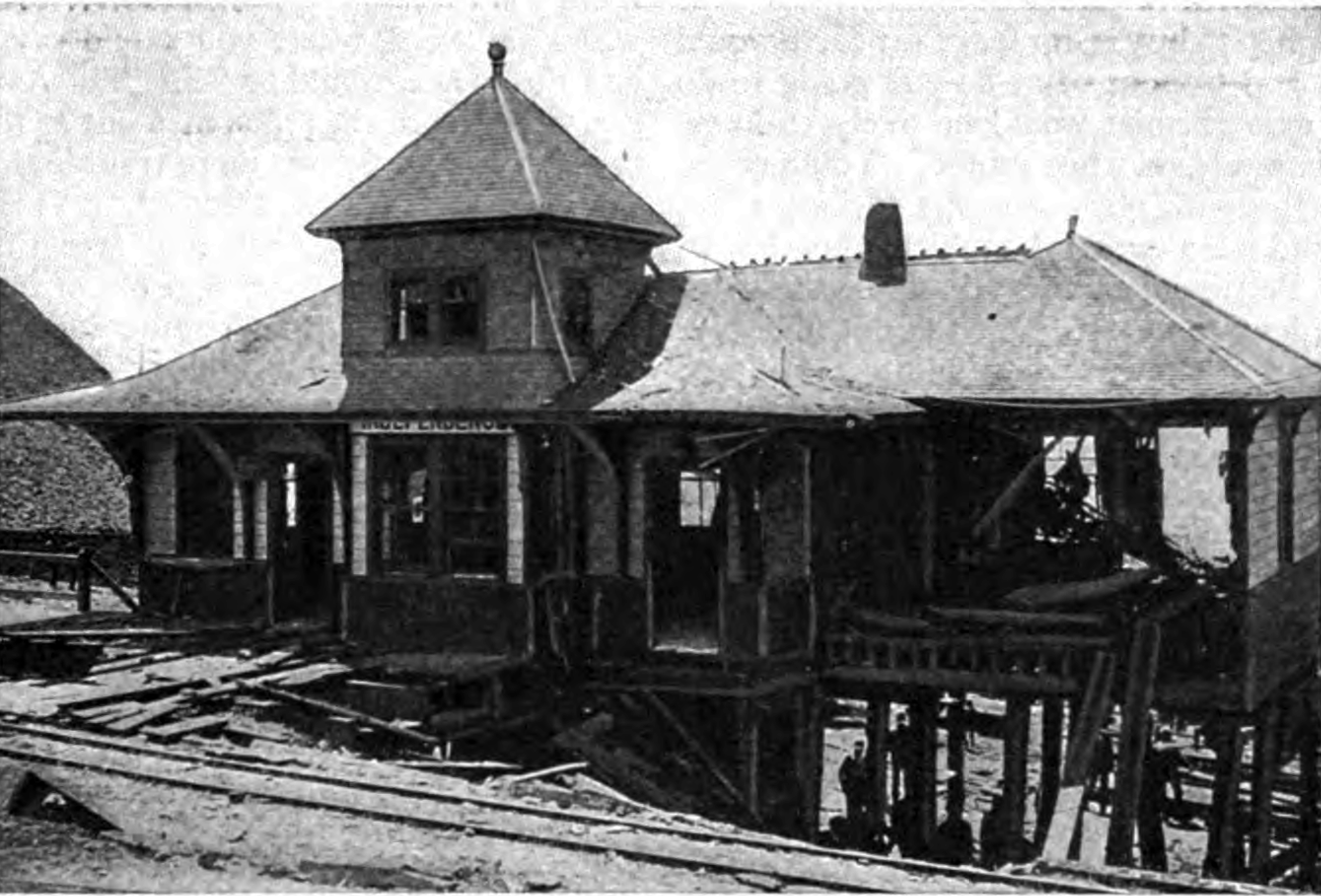
The Independence train depot after the explosion

- In the early morning hours, a bomb exploded at the Independence train depot in the area of Cripple Creek, Colorado, killing 15 miners, most of them non-union members. Later in the day, gunfire erupted during a mass meeting in Victor, Colorado, killing two people and wounding several others. Shortly afterwards, a gunfight between a militia company and miners inside the Union hall resulted in multiple injuries and arrests.
- Born:
  - Lesley Blanch, British writer and traveler; in Chiswick, London, England (d. 2007)
  - Raymond Burke (born Raymond Barrois), American jazz clarinetist; in New Orleans, Louisiana (d. 1986)
  - Francisco López Merino, Argentine poet; in La Plata, Buenos Aires Province, Argentina (d. 1928, suicide by firearm)
- Died: Chippy McGarr (born James B. McGarr), 41, American Major League Baseball third baseman, died of paresis.

== June 7, 1904 (Tuesday) ==
- A firedamp explosion in a coal mine near Oviedo, Spain, killed 20 people.
- In New York City, Hannah Elias was arrested on charges of blackmailing John R. Platt. She would be arraigned at The Tombs on June 10.
- Born:
  - Werner Gruner, German weapons designer and mechanical engineer; in Zschadraß, German Empire (d. 1995)
  - Don Murray, American jazz clarinet and saxophone player; in Joliet, Illinois (d. 1929, fall from moving automobile)
- Died: Moishe Finkel, c. 54, Yiddish theatre performer, shot and seriously wounded his wife, actress Emma Thomashefsky Finkel, and then shot and killed himself.

== June 8, 1904 (Wednesday) ==
- In the aftermath of the St. Louis bullfight riot on June 5, Irish-born matador Carleton Bass shot and killed Spanish matador Manuel Cervera Prieto at the Mozart Hotel in St. Louis as a result of a quarrel between them. Bass claimed self-defense; the coroner's inquest would agree, and Bass would never stand trial for the shooting.
- In the aftermath of the Independence explosion on June 6, martial law was proclaimed in Teller County.
- Born:
  - Jean-Jérôme Adam, Roman Catholic Archbishop of Libreville; in Wittenheim, Alsace (d. 1981)
  - Angus McBean, Welsh surrealist photographer and set designer; in Newbridge, Wales (d. 1990)

== June 9, 1904 (Thursday) ==
- The London Symphony Orchestra gave its first concert, conducted by Hans Richter, at the Queen's Hall.
- Born: William Joscelyn Arkell, British geologist and palaeontologist; in Highworth, Wiltshire, England (d. 1958, stroke)

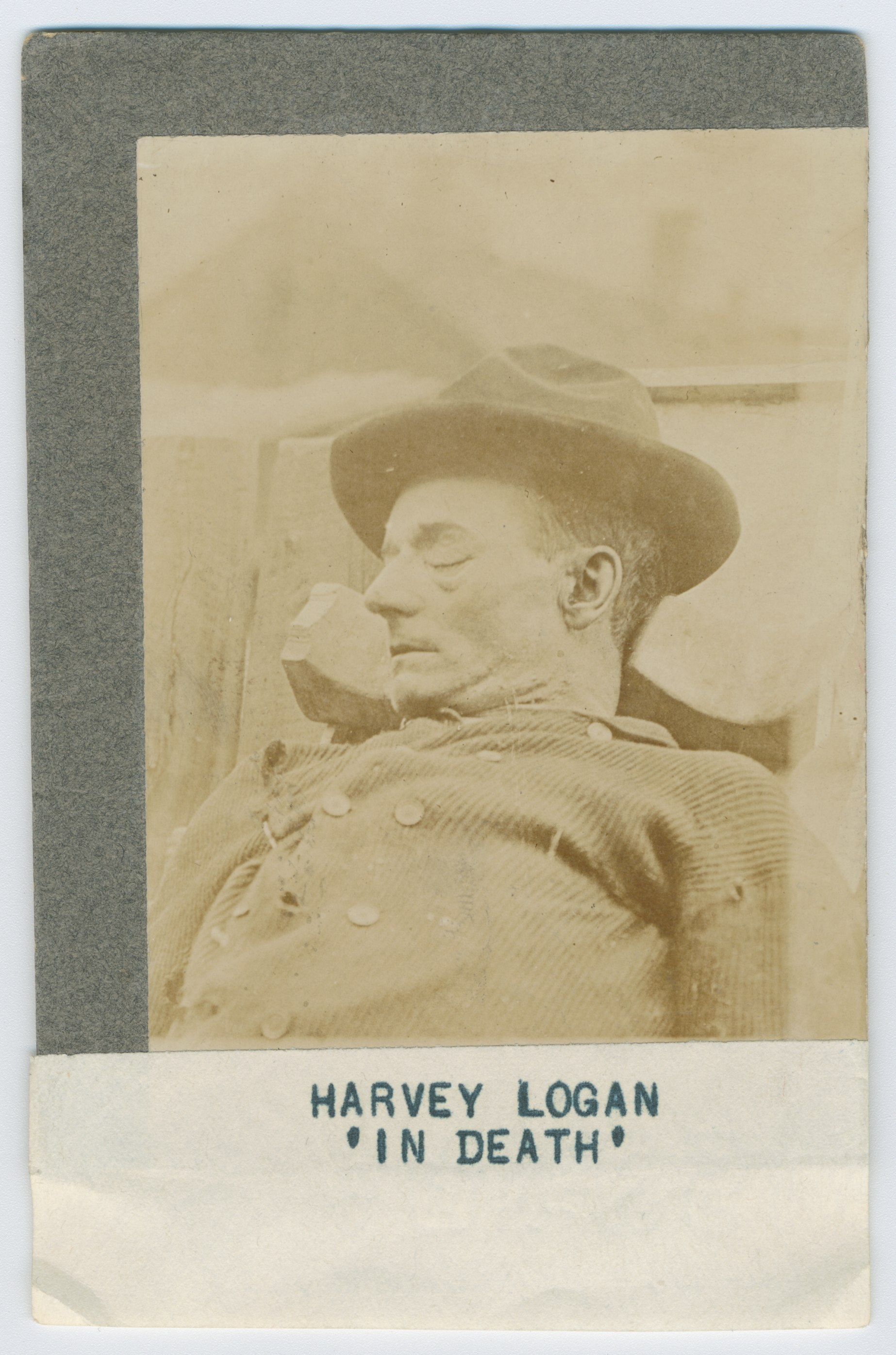
The corpse of American outlaw Harvey Logan

- Died:
  - Harvey Logan (a.k.a. Kid Curry), 36–37, American outlaw (Butch Cassidy's Wild Bunch), shot himself to death.
  - Kwasi Boachi, 77, Prince of the Ashanti Empire and Dutch mining engineer
  - Levi Leiter, 69, American businessman, co-founder of Marshall Field's, died of heart disease.
  - Hendrik Frans Schaefels, 76, Belgian painter and engraver

== June 10, 1904 (Friday) ==
- A court in Frankfurt, Germany, found against violinist Jan Kubelík in a lawsuit he had filed against a music critic for the Frankfurter Zeitung who had called him a "stupid-looking man, of effeminate appearance".
- Irish author James Joyce met his future wife, Nora Barnacle, in Dublin, Ireland.
- Born: Lin Huiyin, Chinese architect and writer; in Hangzhou, Zhejiang, Qing dynasty, China (d. 1955, tuberculosis)
- Died: Laurence Hutton, 60, American author and essayist, died of pneumonia.

== June 11, 1904 (Saturday) ==
- Born:
  - Gaston Charlot, French chemist; in Paris, France (d. 1994)
  - Pinetop Smith (born Clarence Smith), American boogie-woogie blues pianist; in Troy, Alabama (d. 1929, gunshot wound)
- Died:
  - Clas Theodor Odhner, 67, Swedish historian
  - Abner McKinley, 56–57, brother of former U.S. President William McKinley, died of a brain hemorrhage due to Bright's disease.

== June 12, 1904 (Sunday) ==
- French road bicycle racer Paul Dangla crashed at a speed of nearly 50 miles per hour (80 km/h) while racing in Magdeburg, Province of Saxony, shortly after winning the "Goldenen Rad von Magdeburg" (Golden Wheel of Magdeburg). He would die of his injuries less than two weeks later.
- The steamer Canada of the Richelieu and Ontario Navigation Company sank after colliding with the collier Cape Breton on the St. Lawrence River. Five people aboard the Canada died.
- Born: Bill Cox, American Olympic middle-distance runner; in Rochester, New York (d. 1996)

== June 13, 1904 (Monday) ==
- The German football club SC Westfalia Herne was founded.
- A severe hurricane which began on June 10 peaked over Cuba with 14 inches (360 mm) of rain within five hours. The storm destroyed low-lying areas of El Cobre, Cuba. At least 87 people, and possibly as many as 250, were killed.
- In Lexington, Kentucky, Police Judge John J. Riley sentenced 15-year-old African American Simon Scearce to a public whipping by his mother for striking a white boy. Scearce's mother gave him 20 lashes with a buggy whip in front of a large crowd. According to the following day's Los Angeles Herald, "This is the first time such an incident has been witnessed in Kentucky since the Civil War."
- The Harvard athletic committee voted to bar pitcher Walter Clarkson from participation in further Harvard baseball games due to his signing a contract with the New York Highlanders.
- United States Army First Lieutenant Nathaniel E. Bower was struck and killed by lightning on the target range at Fort Leavenworth, Kansas. The lightning bolt struck the rifle Bower was carrying and passed through his right arm into his body.
- Died:
  - James Gullan, 29, Australian footballer, died of accidental poisoning.
  - John L. McAtee, 62, American cattle rancher and judge, died of paralysis.

== June 14, 1904 (Tuesday) ==
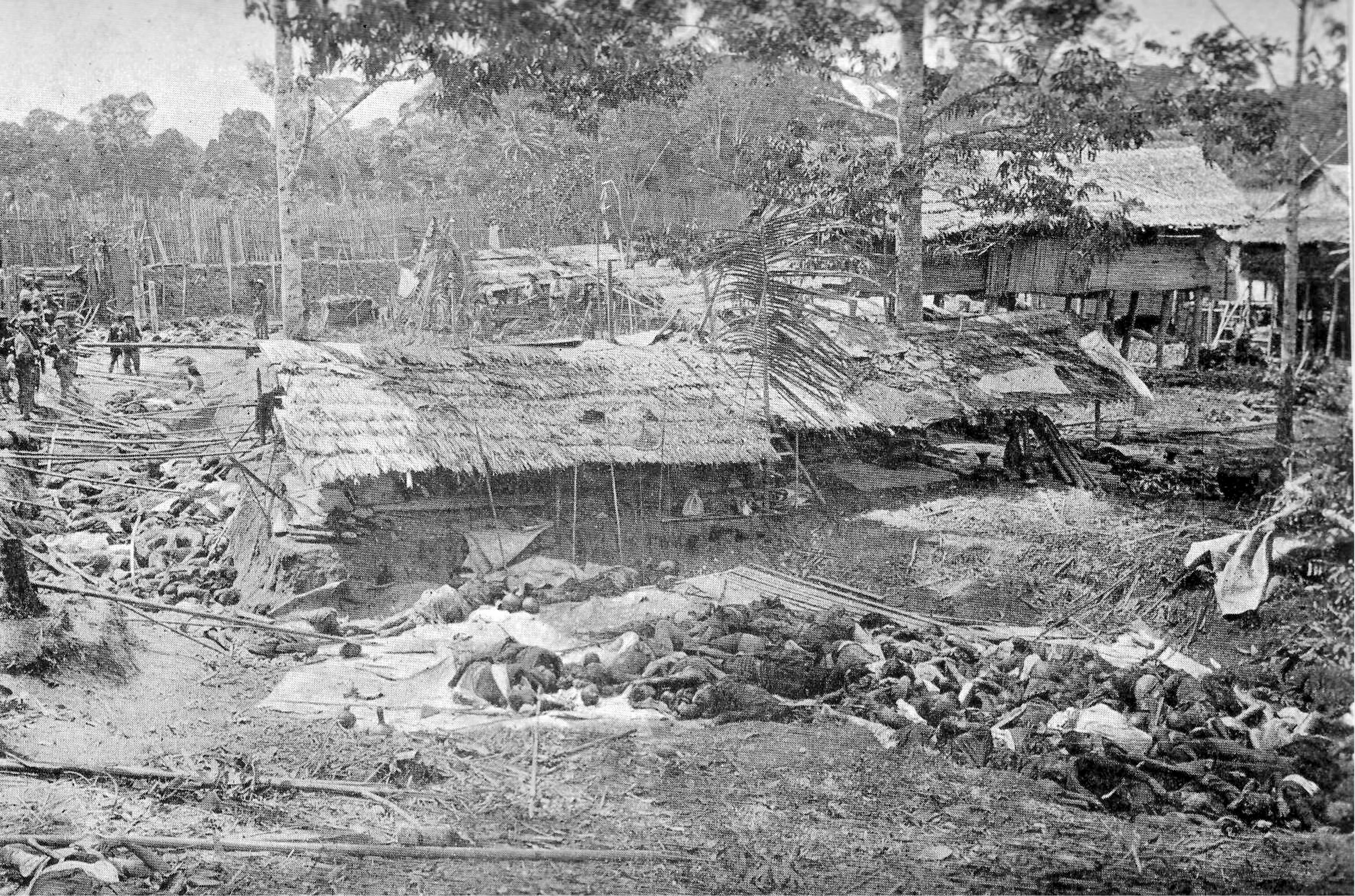
The Kuta Reh massacre

- Members of the Royal Netherlands East Indies Army's Korps Marechaussee te voet, led by General Gotfried Coenraad Ernst van Daalen, perpetrated the Kuta Reh massacre in Aceh, Dutch East Indies, killing 561 people, including 59 children.
- In New York City, Nan Patterson pled not guilty to first-degree murder in the death of "Caesar" Young. She would eventually go free after two trials resulted in hung juries.
- American despatch bearer Frederick Kent Loomis, the brother of U.S. Assistant Secretary of State Francis B. Loomis, set out from New York to Plymouth, England on the liner Kaiser Wilhelm II. Loomis was traveling from New York to Abyssinia in the company of businessman William Henry Ellis, carrying a Treaty of Amity and Commerce, the first trade agreement between the United States and Abyssinia, to King Menelik II.
- Born:
  - Margaret Bourke-White (born Margaret White), American photographer; in The Bronx, New York City (d. 1971, Parkinson's disease)
  - Marion Yorck von Wartenburg (born Marion Winter), German jurist and Resistance fighter; in Berlin, Germany (d. 2007)
- Died: Nikiforos Lytras, 72, Greek painter, died of poisoning from paint vapors.

== June 15, 1904 (Wednesday) ==
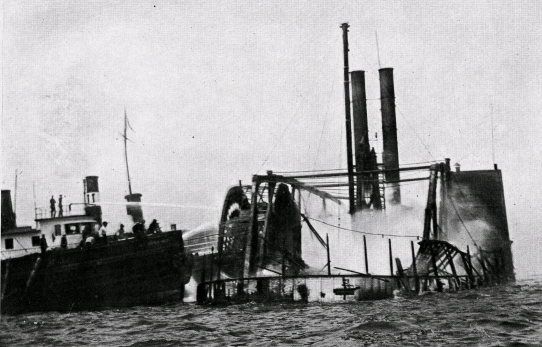
A fireboat fighting the General Slocum fire

- A fire aboard the steamboat General Slocum in New York City's East River killed 1,021 people, in New York's deadliest disaster prior to the September 11 attacks in 2001.
- The Battle of Te-li-Ssu (also known as the Battle of Wafangou) ended in a Japanese victory.
- The first transmission of wireless telegraphy featuring music and speech took place in Salzburg, with Otto Nußbaumer making the transmission.
- At 2 a.m., a white mob seized Marie Thompson, an African American woman, from a jail in Lebanon Junction, Kentucky, where she was being held for the killing of white farmer John Irvin the previous day. Thompson, who had claimed self-defense, grabbed a knife from a man in the crowd and cut herself down from the tree from which the mob was attempting to hang her. She was then shot and mortally wounded while attempting to escape.
- Born:
  - Harrison Forman, American photographer and journalist; in Milwaukee, Wisconsin (d. 1978)
  - Anna Mahler, Austrian sculptor; in Vienna, Austria (d. 1988)

== June 16, 1904 (Thursday) ==
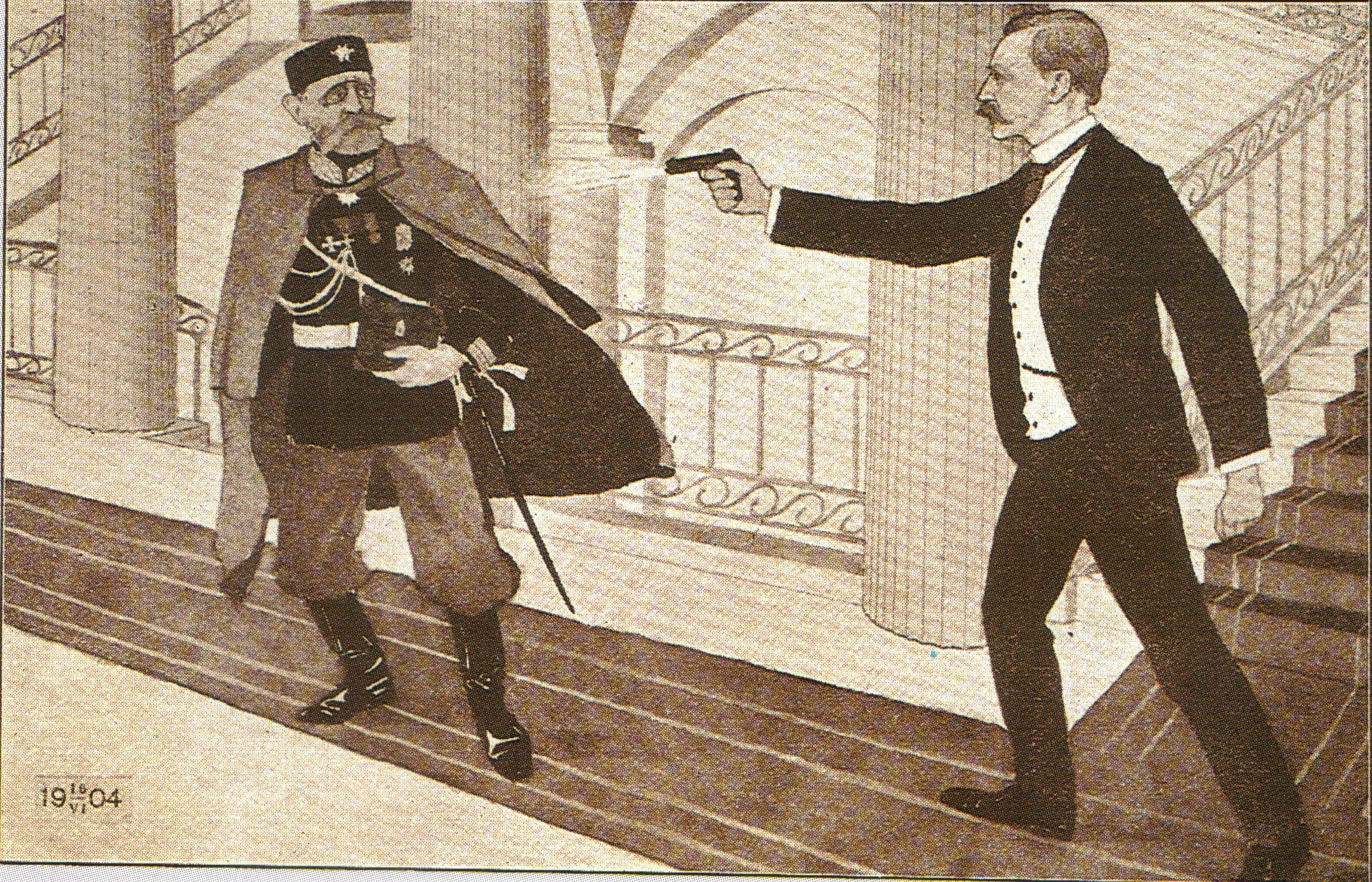
Assassination of Nikolay Bobrikov

- Finnish nationalist Eugen Schauman, 29, shot and mortally wounded Nikolay Bobrikov, the Russian Governor-General of Finland, in Helsinki. Schauman then took his own life.
- James Joyce walked to Ringsend with Nora Barnacle; he would later use this date (Bloomsday) as the setting for his novel Ulysses.
- Due to a malfunction during an execution at the Ohio penitentiary shortly after midnight, convicted murderer Michael Schiller revived three times in the electric chair before dying.
- The Arkansas state convention of the Democratic Party adjourned, having adopted a platform which included the statement: "We condemn President Roosevelt, among other things, especially for his public and private conduct tending to stir up bitterness between the different sections of the country and to make the negro believe that he is the social and other equal of the white man."
- Born: Frederick Campion Steward, British botanist; in Pimlico, London, England (d. 1993)
- Died:
  - Nathan Smith Davis, 87, American physician, first editor of the Journal of the American Medical Association, died of uremic poisoning.
  - Manuel Uribe Ángel, 81, Colombian physician, died of tongue and stomach cancer.

== June 17, 1904 (Friday) ==
- The Royal Navy torpedo boat destroyer HMS Sparrowhawk struck an uncharted rock at the mouth of the Yangtze and sank. There were no fatalities.
- Born:
  - Ralph Bellamy, American actor; in Chicago, Illinois (d. 1991, lung illness)
  - J. Vernon McGee, American theologian, pastor, author, and Bible teacher; in Hillsboro, Texas (d. 1988, heart failure)
  - Patrice Tardif, Canadian politician; in Saint-Méthode-de-Frontenac, Quebec, Canada (d. 1989)
- Died:
  - Nikolay Bobrikov, 65, Russian soldier, politician and Governor-General of Finland, died after being shot the previous day.
  - James Augustin Greer, 71, United States Navy rear admiral
  - James Herron Hopkins, 72, American lawyer and politician, member of the United States House of Representatives from Pennsylvania

== June 18, 1904 (Saturday) ==
- Horace Porter, the United States Ambassador to France, received the Grand Cross of the Legion of Honour, which Émile Loubet, the President of France, had conferred upon him.
- Theodore Douglas Robinson, a nephew of President Theodore Roosevelt, married Helen Roosevelt, a half-niece of future President Franklin D. Roosevelt, in Hyde Park, New York.
- In Chicago, a reserved section of seats collapsed at a circus, seriously injuring at least 9 people. The show's treasurer disappeared with over $600 of the circus' money during the panic.
- Born:
  - Keye Luke, Chinese-born American actor; in Guangzhou, Qing dynasty (d. 1991, stroke)
  - Manuel Rosenthal, French composer and conductor; in Paris, France (d. 2003)
- Died:
  - Sami Frashëri, 54, Albanian writer
  - Frank Johnson, 56, Australian journalist and politician, died from an accidental fall.
  - Celia Logan, 66, American actress, author and playwright, died of arteriosclerosis and a cerebral hemorrhage.

== June 19, 1904 (Sunday) ==
- Frederick Kent Loomis disappeared from the Kaiser Wilhelm II on the eve of its arrival in Plymouth, England. Loomis was last seen aboard ship about midnight.
- Two railroad workers were killed, and one severely injured, in a head-on collision about 2 miles (3.2 km) south of Sapulpa, Indian Territory.

== June 20, 1904 (Monday) ==
- In Cleveland, Ohio, a fire at a saloon building killed two people and injured six.
- In Kansas City, Missouri, an ammonia explosion on the fourth floor of the Block Preserving factory caused the building to collapse, killing two people and injuring seven. The building had not been properly repaired after being damaged by a tornado in 1886.
- Born:
  - Heinrich von Brentano, German politician; in Offenbach am Main, German Empire (d. 1964, cancer)
  - George Melendez Wright, American-Salvadoran biologist; in San Francisco, California (d. 1936, traffic collision)
- Died:
  - Edward Drake, 72, English clergyman and first-class cricketer
  - Joseph Seiss, 81, American Lutheran theologian and minister

== June 21, 1904 (Tuesday) ==
- Czar Nicholas II of Russia attended the burial of Nikolay Bobrikov at Sergievo, near Saint Petersburg, unaccompanied by Empress Alexandra. The Los Angeles Herald would report the following day, "A long expected event in the imperial family is understood to be imminent."

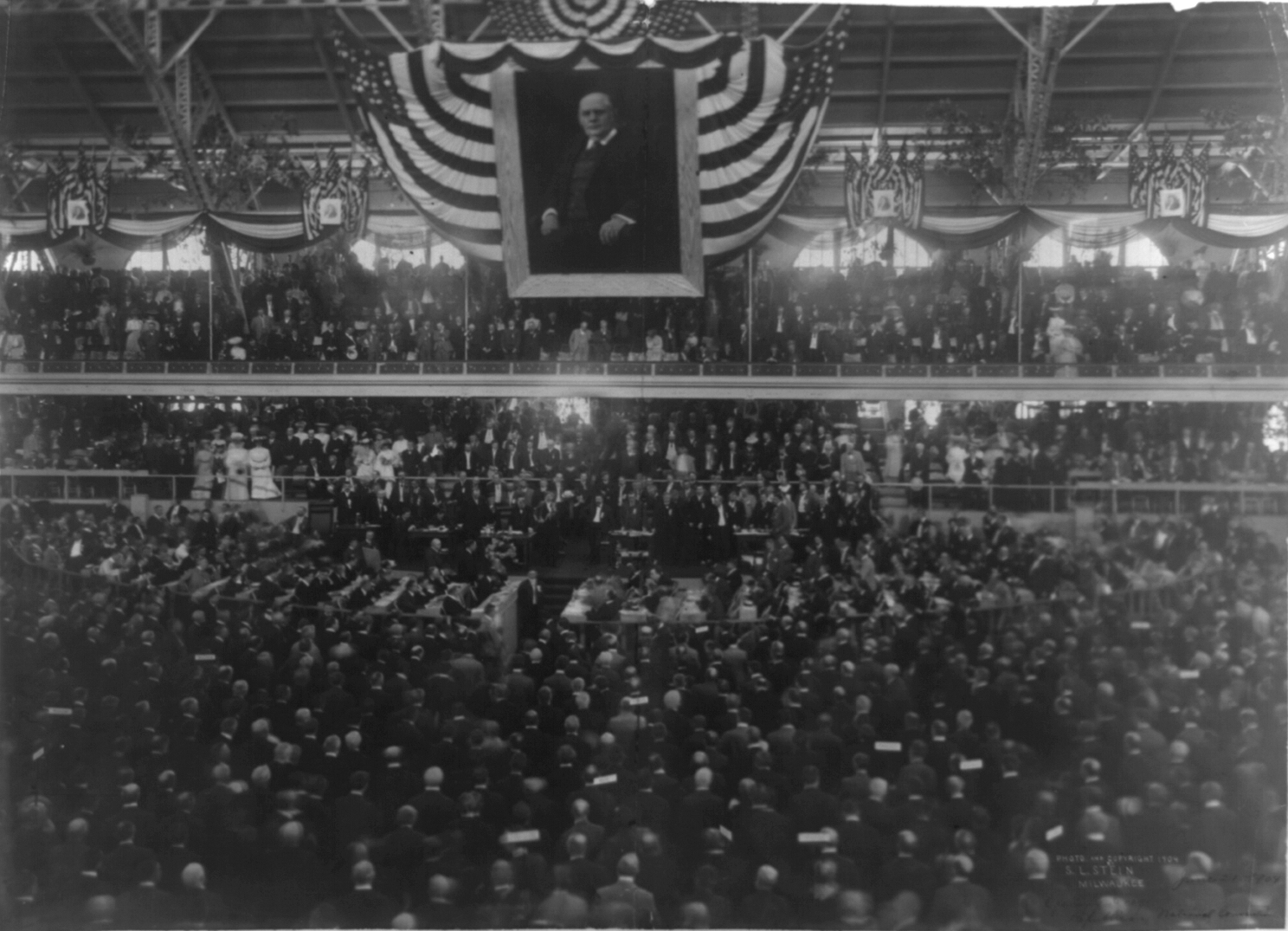
Opening prayer at the Republican National Convention

- The 1904 Republican National Convention began at the Chicago Coliseum in Chicago, Illinois.
- Born:
  - Mack Gordon (born Morris Gittler), American composer and lyricist; in Congress Poland, Russian Empire (d. 1959)
  - Orian Landreth, American football coach; in Kansas (d. 1996)
- Died: Frederic William Madden, 65, British numismatist

== June 22, 1904 (Wednesday) ==
- An explosion destroyed the auxiliary sloop yacht Cleo L in New York Harbor opposite 34th Street in South Brooklyn, killing the yacht's owner, Albert Acke, and storekeeper Charles Johnson.
- American artist Harry Roseland married Olive May Sands in Los Angeles, California.
- In the Province of Teruel in Spain, a passenger train derailed on a bridge over the Jiloca during a storm. The train's coaches and the bridge caught on fire, and the engine and some of the coaches fell into the river. 30 people died, most of them gendarmes.
- Born:
  - George Abell, English civil servant and cricketer; in Worcester, England (d. 1989)
  - William O. Gallery, United States Navy rear admiral; in Chicago, Illinois (d. 1981)
- Died:
  - Henry Copeland, 65, English-born Australian politician
  - Karl Ritter von Stremayr, 80, Austrian statesman, former Minister-President of Cisleithania

== June 23, 1904 (Thursday) ==
- Delegates at the Republican National Convention nominated incumbent Theodore Roosevelt for President of the United States and Charles W. Fairbanks for Vice President of the United States, nominating Fairbanks by acclamation. The final person to make a speech seconding Roosevelt's nomination was African American lawyer Harry S. Cummings of Baltimore, Maryland. U.S. Speaker of the House Joseph Gurney Cannon, serving as Chairman of the Convention, did not grasp Cummings' hand while introducing him, as he did with every other speaker.
- American astronomer William Hussey of Lick Observatory announced his discovery of 100 newly identified double stars.
- Born:
  - Bill Capps (born Thomas Wilburn Capps), National Football League guard and tackle; in Pooleville, Oklahoma (d. 1979, heart ailment)
  - Quintin McMillan, South African cricketer; in Germiston, Transvaal Colony (d. 1948)
- Died: Seth H. Ellis, 74, American politician, 1900 Union Reform Party presidential candidate, died from an accidental fall.

== June 24, 1904 (Friday) ==
- Greek American playboy Ion Perdicaris and his stepson, British subject Cromwell Varley, who had been held hostage in Morocco since May 18, were released.
- Trooping the Colour 1904 took place under the supervision of George, Prince of Wales.
- Born:
  - Phil Harris (born Wonga Philip Harris), American actor and bandleader; near Linton, Indiana (d. 1995, heart attack)
  - Clark J. Adams, American lawyer, politician and judge, justice of the Michigan Supreme Court; on Silver Lake (Waterford Township, Michigan) (d. 1981)
  - Francis Leslie Ashton, British writer; in Chapel-en-le-Frith, Derbyshire (d. 1994)
- Died:
  - Richard Knill Freeman, 63–64, British architect
  - Carlos D. Shelden, 64, American soldier and politician, member of the United States House of Representatives from Michigan

== June 25, 1904 (Saturday) ==
- Born: Patrick Balfour, 3rd Baron Kinross, Scottish historian and biographer; in Edinburgh, Scotland (d. 1976)
- Died:
  - Paul Dangla, 22 or 26, French road bicycle racer, died from injuries sustained in a race crash(some sources give date of death as June 18, 1904).
  - Carl Friedrich Wilhelm Jordan, 85, German writer and politician
  - Frederick Sandys (born Antonio Frederic Augustus Sands), 75, British artist
  - Clement Scott, 62, English theatre critic

== June 26, 1904 (Sunday) ==
- Born:
  - Peter Lorre (born László Löwenstein), Hungarian-born film actor; in Rózsahegy, Austria-Hungary (d. 1964)
  - Francis W. H. Adams, American lawyer, New York City Police Commissioner; in Mount Vernon, New York (d. 1990, heart failure)
  - Seaborne Davies (born David Richard Seaborne Davies), Welsh law teacher and Member of Parliament; in Pwllheli, Wales (d. 1984)
  - Virginia Brown Faire (born Virginia Cecelia Labuna), American actress; in Brooklyn, New York City (d. 1980, cancer)
  - Lynn Ungoed-Thomas, Welsh politician; in Carmarthen, Wales (d. 1972)
- Died:
  - James Moore, 69, Irish-born Roman Catholic Bishop of Ballarat, Victoria (Australia), died of diabetes.
  - William Ormsby-Gore, 2nd Baron Harlech, 85, Anglo-Irish peer and Member of Parliament

== June 27, 1904 (Monday) ==
- A London news agency carried a report that the body of Frederick Kent Loomis had been washed ashore near Cherbourg, France. This would be reported to be false the following day. Loomis' body would be discovered washed up at Thurleston Sands, Bigbury Bay, Kingsbridge, on July 16.
- The second Fastnet Lighthouse came into service at the southwest corner of Ireland.
- Thirty-three men drowned while cleaning an 8-foot (2.4 m) water pipe at the power station of Kingston's Electric Tramway Company, about 2 miles (3.2 km) from Bog Walk, Jamaica.
- Born:
  - William O. Burch, United States Navy rear admiral and Navy Cross recipient, in Paducah, Kentucky (d. 1989)
  - Emrys Davies (born David Emrys Davies), Welsh cricketer; in Sandy, Llanelly, Carmarthenshire, Wales (d. 1975)
- Died: Anatole Jean-Baptiste Antoine de Barthélemy, 82, French archaeologist

== June 28, 1904 (Tuesday) ==
- The original icon of Our Lady of Kazan was stolen and subsequently destroyed in Russia.
- The English Association football club Hull City A.F.C. was established.
- The Danish ocean liner SS Norge ran aground on Hasselwood Rock, a skerry near Rockall, and sank, killing approximately 627 people, many of whom were Russian-Polish and Scandinavian emigrants.
- Chief Engineer John Findley Wallace and a small group of American workers arrived in Panama to continue the work the French had begun on the Panama Canal.
- Died:
  - Princess and Countess Aurora Pavlovna Demidova, 30
  - Dan Emmett, 88, American songwriter ("Dixie"), founder of the Virginia Minstrels

== June 29, 1904 (Wednesday) ==
- The 1904 Moscow tornado occurred.
- During a test dive at the Baltic Shipyard, the Russian submarine Delfin sank in the Neva due to lack of discipline among untrained crewmembers, drowning a lieutenant and twenty men.

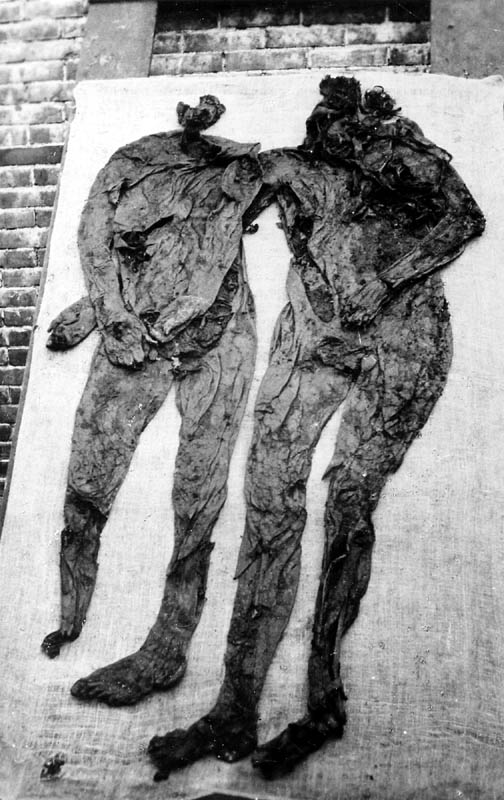
The Weerdinge Men shortly after their discovery

- A Dutch peat cutter discovered the Weerdinge Men, two bog bodies from between 160 BCE and 220 CE, in the southern part of Bourtange moor.
- Born:
  - Witold Hurewicz, Polish mathematician; in Łódź, Russian Empire (d. 1956, accidental fall)
  - Allie Morrison, American Olympic champion freestyle wrestler; in Marshalltown, Iowa (d. 1966)
  - Umberto Mozzoni, Argentine Roman Catholic cardinal; in Buenos Aires, Argentina (d. 1983)
- Died:
  - Pablo de Anda Padilla, 73, Mexican Roman Catholic priest and venerable, died from bladder stones.
  - Tom Emmett, 62, English cricketer
  - John L. Mitchell, 61, member of the United States House of Representatives and United States Senate from Wisconsin

== June 30, 1904 (Thursday) ==
- The Sanitary Department for the construction of the Panama Canal was formed, headed by United States Army Medical Corps physician William C. Gorgas.
- In Scranton, South Carolina, Cairo Williams, an African American man, was taken off a train and lynched for the February murder of Thurston McGee, a white man.
- In Bakersfield, California, James Cowan was convicted of manslaughter for the March lynching of James Cummings in Mojave, California. Superior Judge Mahon would sentence Cowan to eight years in prison on July 22.
- American professional cyclist Robert Walthour was severely injured during a race in Atlanta, Georgia, but would recover.
- Born: Marianne Angermann, German–born Spanish–New Zealand biochemist and anti–fascist
- Died: Robert Borthwick Adam, 71, Scottish-born American retailer and book collector
