= Chemin de fer de La Mure =

Narrow gauge railway line in Isère, France

Coordinates: 44.9569°N 5.7395°E

Chemin de Fer de La Mure
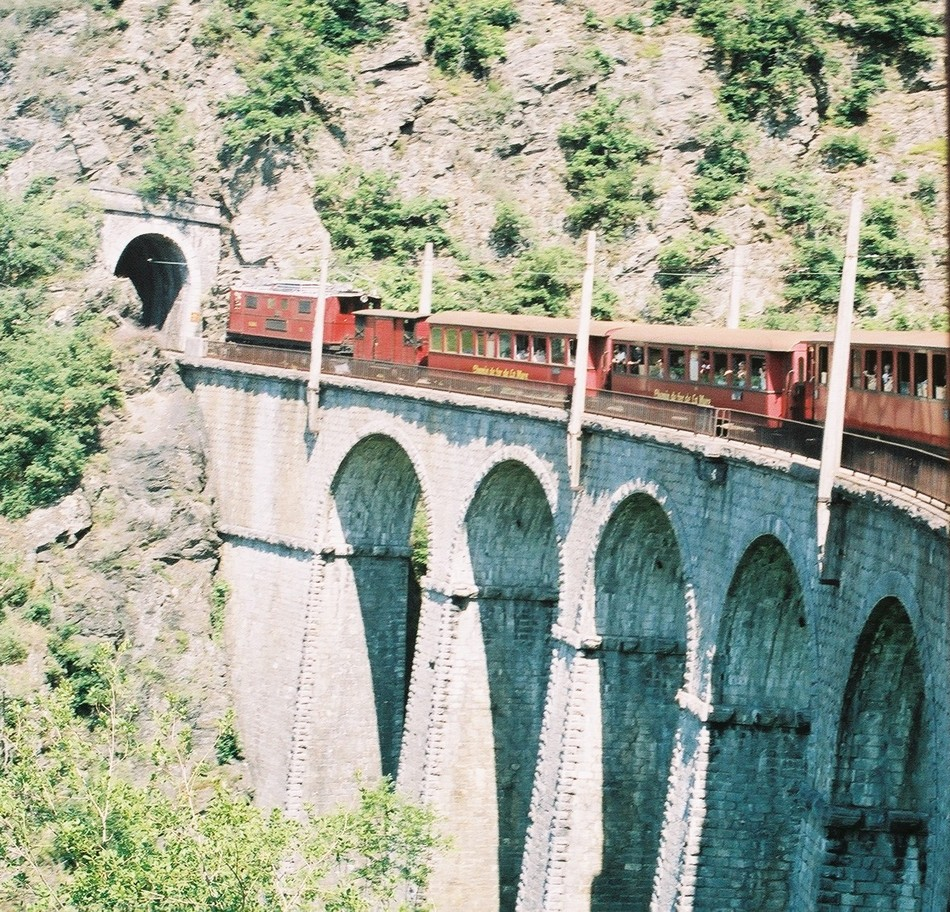
- A train on the upper viaduct at Loulla (Isère)

Overview
- Termini: St.-Georges-de-Commiers; La Mure (Isère)

History
- Opened: 1888
- Closed: 2010 (see text)

Technical
- Line length: 30 km (19 mi)
- Track gauge: 1,000 mm (3 ft 3 3/8 in) metre gauge
- Electrification: 2400 V DC Overhead line
- Highest elevation: 925 m (3,035 ft)

The Chemin de Fer de La Mure (La Mure railway) is a former coal-carrying electrified railway in (and owned by) the Department of Isère near the city of Grenoble, France, which lost its regular public passenger service from 2 February 1950 (although miners' trains continued until autumn 1962). It lost most of its freight traffic – apart from anthracite coal – in 1952, and even the anthracite ceased from 18 October 1988. However, the local tourist office had been chartering seasonal tourist passenger trains from 8 September 1968 and these developed steadily over the years, the line becoming one of the finest tourist railways in Europe with views over dams and lakes, and mountain scenery. Since 1 February 1998 the concession to operate the line and its tourist trains has been held by CFTA, now Veolia. The line can be reached easily by road from Grenoble, or by trains on the SNCF line towards Gap.

On 26 October 2010, shortly before the end of the season, a landslide destroyed the Viaduc de la Clapisse and parts of a tunnel entrance. In June 2017, the General Council of the Department of Isère announced that the company Edeis had been chosen to repair the railway and take over its operation, with the aim of having it operational again for the 2020 season. Half the line eventually reopened in July 2021, from the top at La Mure as far as the viewpoint at Le Grand Balcon.

== History ==
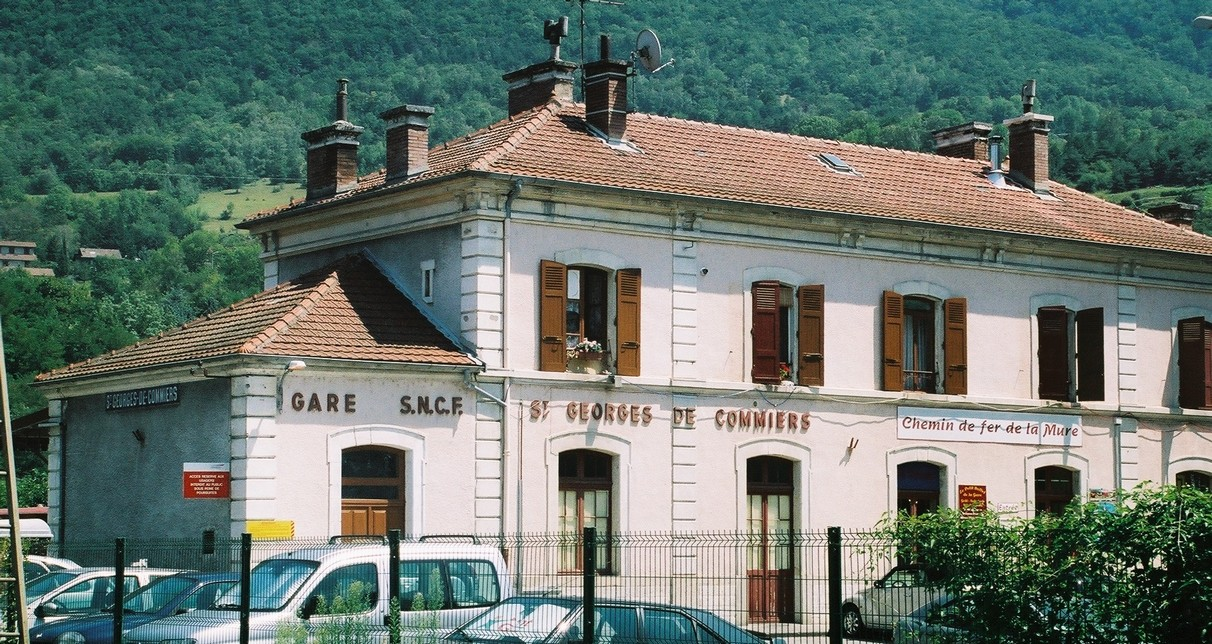
Saint-Georges de Commiers station

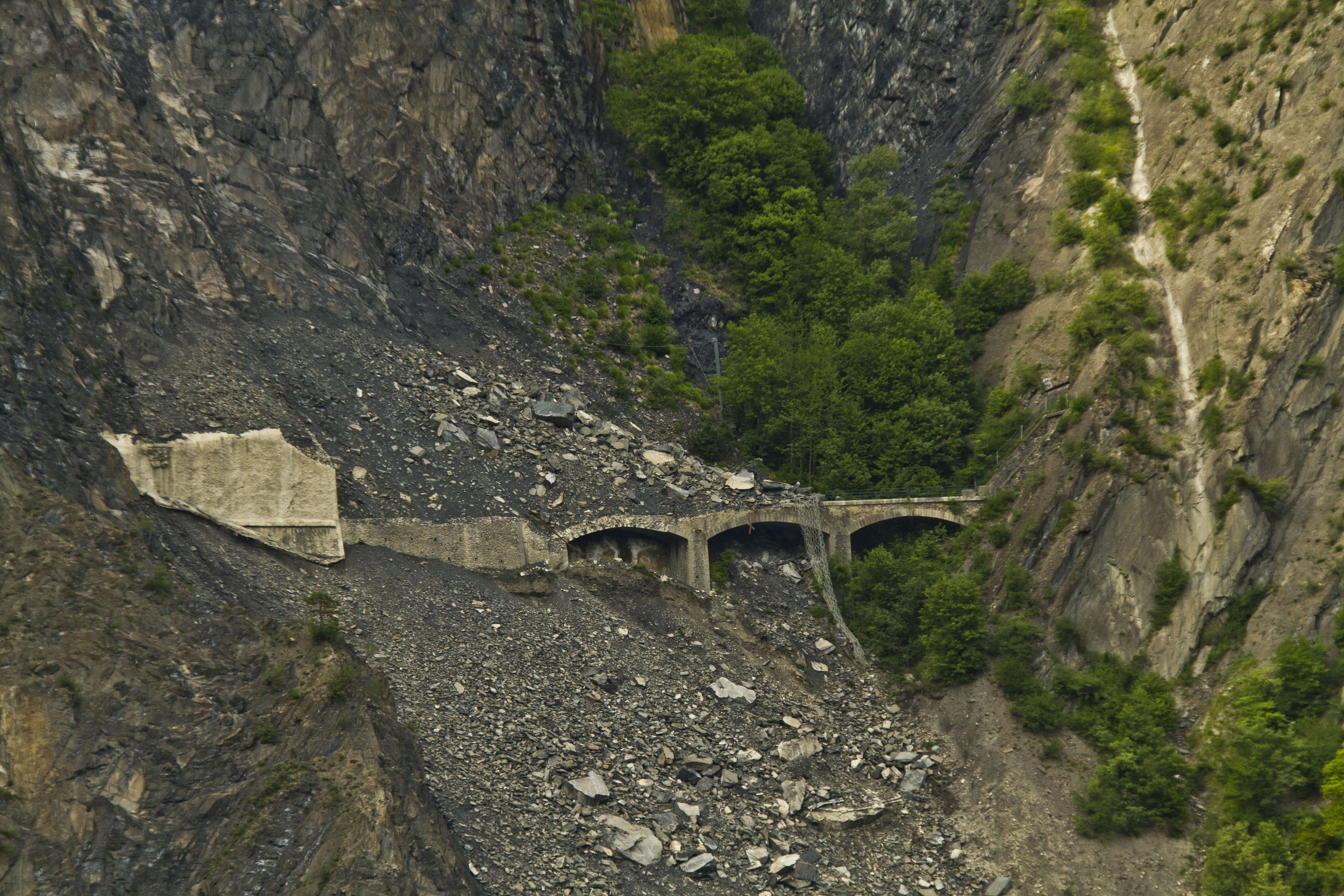
Damage caused by the landslide (2011)

The line was built between 1882 and 1886, to link Saint-Georges-de-Commiers and La Mure through a mountainous region of the department of Isère.

The 30-kilometre (19 mi) long, metre gauge line runs from La Motte-d'Aveillans and La Mure to a connection with the main line of the PLM railway at Saint-Georges-de-Commiers. The line was almost closed in the mid-1970s and if the country hadn't been suffering an oil crisis the line would have met its end. Its life was extended by fifteen years, which proved to be its saviour. Unlike many other lines this became a tourist attraction which combines an area of industrial heritage with some of the finest scenery on any similar line on the continent.

The railway was electrified in 1903, using a symmetrical current power supply with two overhead lines at plus and minus 1200 volts direct current respectively. In 1950, this non-standard system was replaced with a conventional power supply with a single overhead line at 2400 volts direct current. The branch line between La Mure and Corps was opened in 1932 and closed for passenger traffic in 1952.

Coal traffic ceased in 1988, and most of the coal installations were demolished, the coal being transported by road. The Matheysine coalmines were finally closed on 28 March 1997. The SGLM found a new vocation in providing a tourist attraction and as a result, there remain all of the line's historical installations, the workshops, forge, joinery shop, etc.

The network's departure and arrival stations were dependent on connections with the PLM railway's Grenoble–Veynes line. The necessary facilities together with the transhipment platform for the automatic transfer of the coal from the SGLM coal cars to the trains operated by PLM (which became SNCF in 1938) were built adjacent to the PLM station, today the station for the Chemin de fer de La Mure.

== Rolling stock ==
=== Electric and electro-diesel locomotives ===
No.	Name	Wheels Arr.	Builders Details	Date Built	Notes.
E1	La Drac	Bo-Bo	CGC/Thury	1903	E-loc withdrawn 1933, dismantled between 1940 and 1942
E2	L'Isere	Bo-Bo	CGC/Thury	1906-09	E-loc withdrawn 1933, dismantled between 1940 and 1942
E3	Taillefer	Bo-Bo	CGC/Thury	1906-09	E-loc withdrawn 1933, dismantled between 1940 and 1942
E4	Obiou	Bo-Bo	CGC/Thury	1906-09	E-loc withdrawn 1933, dismantled between 1940 and 1942
E5		Bo-Bo	CGC/Thury	1906-09	E-loc withdrawn 1933, dismantled between 1940 and 1942
E6		Bo-Bo	CGC/Thury	1903	Withdrawn 1933, since scrapped
T6		Bo-Bo	ANF/SAAS	1932	E-loc
T7		Bo-Bo	ANF/SAAS	1932	E-loc
T8		Bo-Bo	ANF/SAAS	1932	E-loc
T9		Bo-Bo	ANF/SAAS	1932	E-loc
T10		Bo-Bo	ANF/SAAS	1932	E-loc
T2		Bo-Bo	B+L/Ren.		DE-loc, ex-VFD, Note 1
T4		Bo-Bo	B+L/Ren.		DE-loc, ex-VFD, In working order but not in use, Note 1
		B	Decauville		Draisine, P.W.Dept., acquired in 1966, in regular use
			Suisse		Locotractor

Note 1 : Part of a class of 10 electro-diesel locomotives, 2 are in service at the Chemins de fer du Jura (CJ), 1 at the Chemins de Fer de Provence (CP).

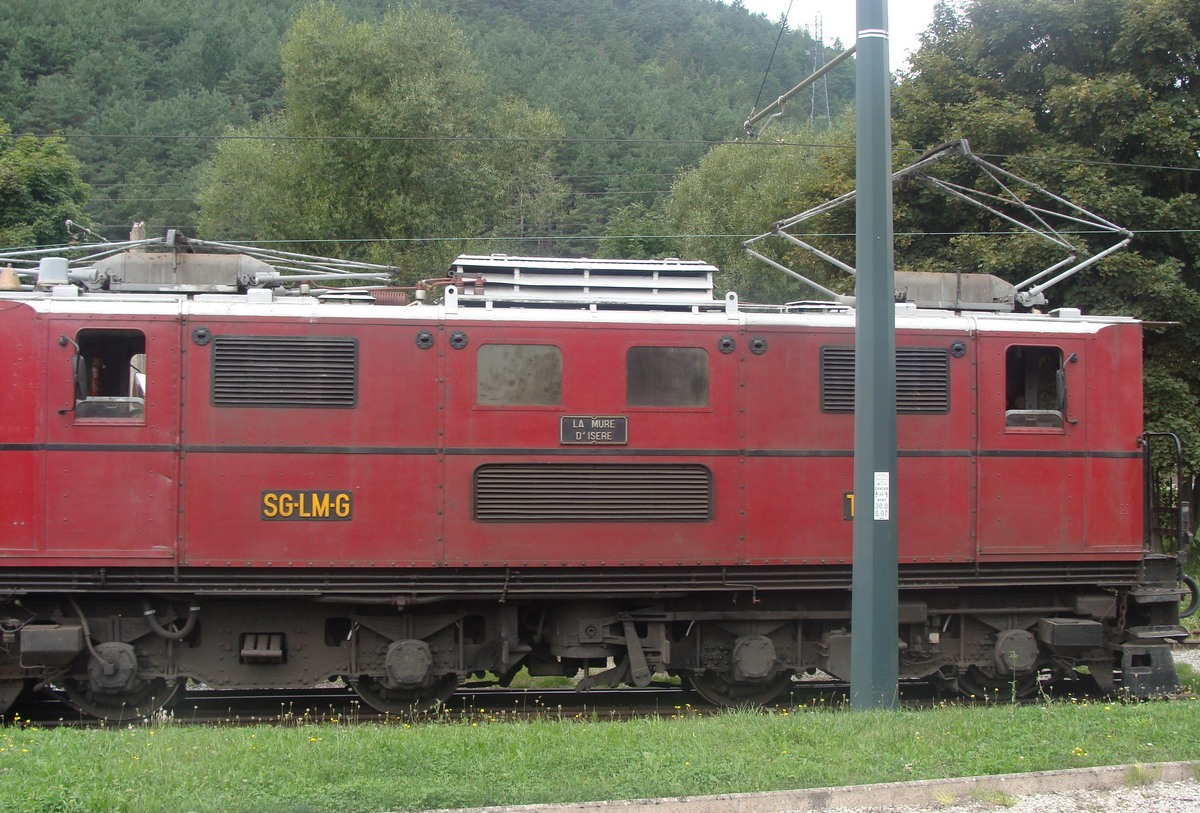
Locomotive T7 in La Mure

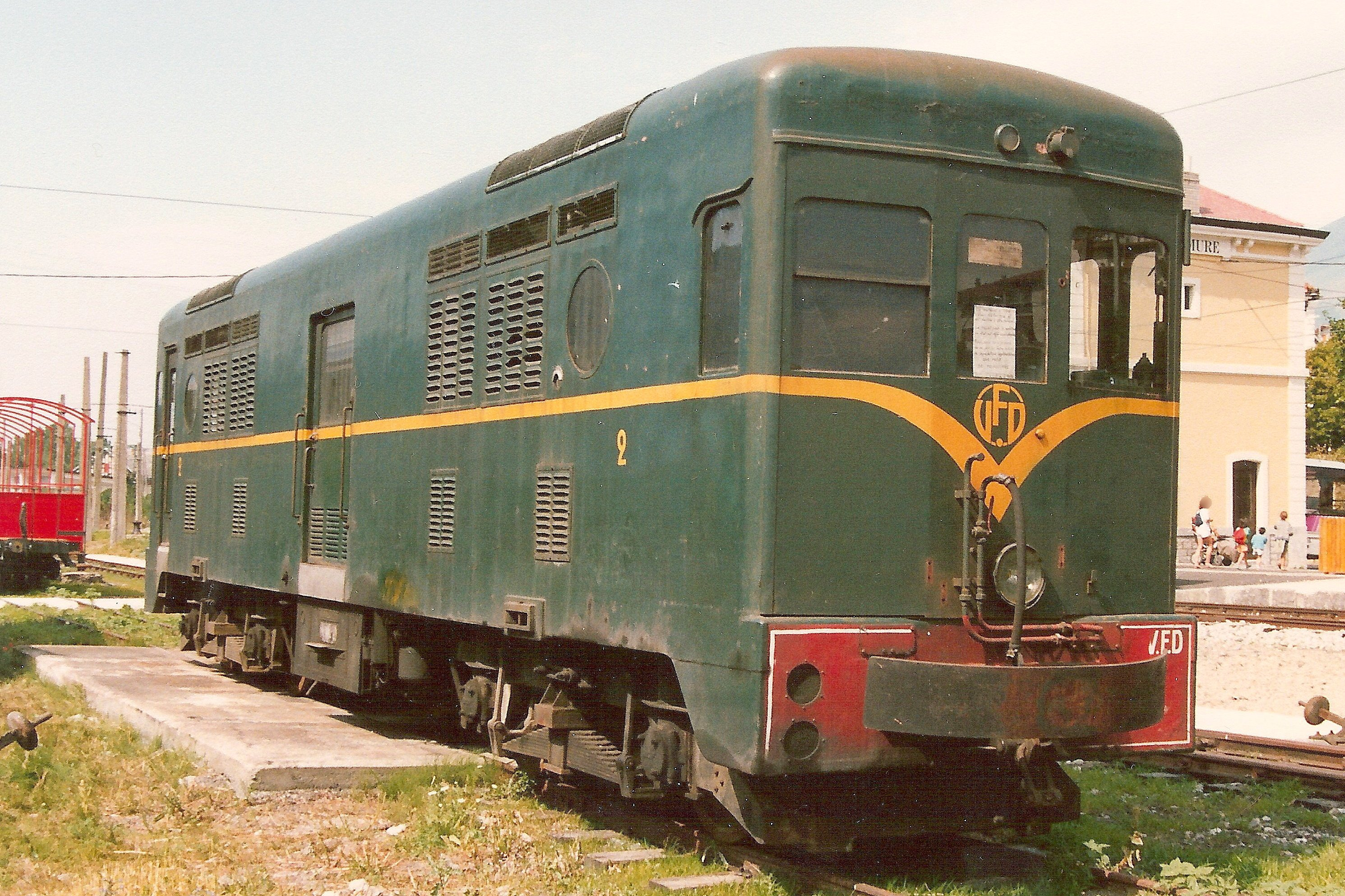
Locomotive T2 in La Mure

=== Electric railcars ===
No.	Name	Wheels Arr.	Builders Details	Date Built	Notes.
A1			CB/T-H	1927	Electric railcar, preserved, out of order
A2			CB/T-H	1913	Electric railcar, scrapped
A3			CB/T-H		Electric railcar, preserved, out of order
A4			CB/T-H		Electric railcar, scrapped
A5			CB/T-H		Electric railcar, preserved, out of order
A6			CB/T-H		Electric railcar, scrapped
A7			CB/T-H		Electric railcar, scrapped
A8			CB/T-H		Electric railcar, scrapped
1		ABDe4/4	SWS/BBC	1916	Electric railcar, 400 hp, ex-NStCM, acquired in 1986–1992, In service
5		ABDe4/4	SWS/BBC	1916	Electric railcar, 400 hp, ex-NStCM, acquired in 1986–1992, Out of Service
10		ABDe4/4	SWS/BBC	1918	Electric railcar, 400 hp, ex-NStCM, acquired in 1986–1992, Out of Service
11		ABDe4/4	SWS/BBC	1918	Electric railcar, 400 hp, ex-NStCM, acquired in 1986–1992, In service

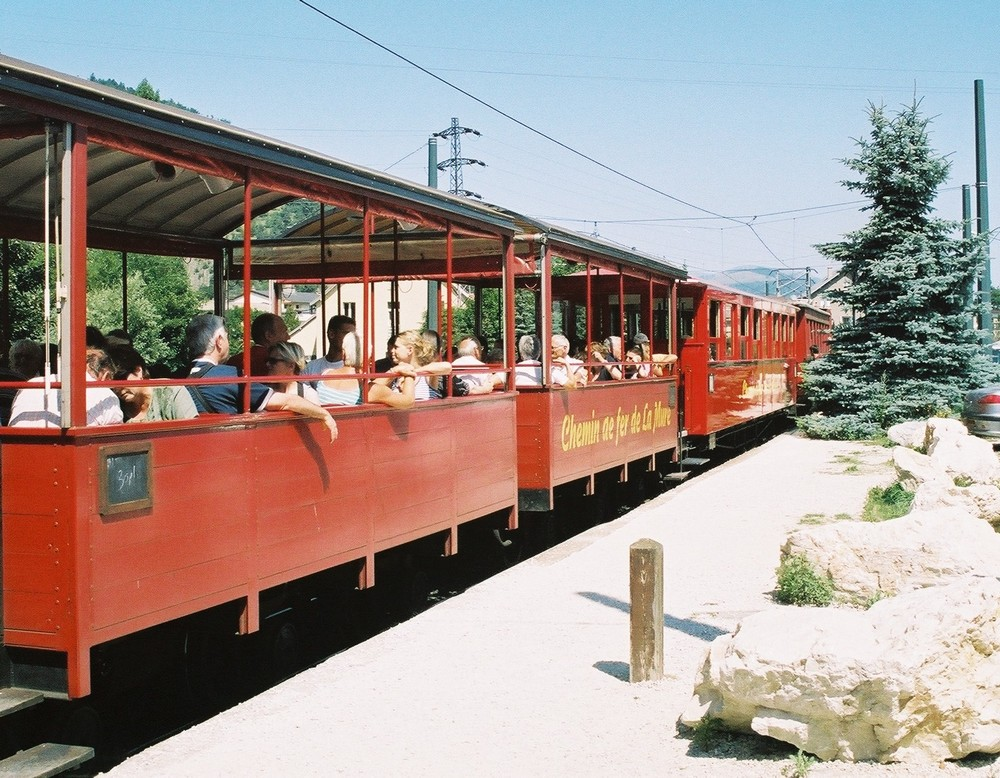
Passenger cars

=== Passenger trailers ===
No.	Name	Wheel Arrangement	Builder Details	Year built	Notes
B27, B30		2'2'		1930	ex-SGLM
B3		2'2'	ANF	1907	ex-Chemin de Fer Nyon–St-Cergue–Morez (NStCM), acquired in 1992
B5		2'2'	ANF	1907	ex-Nyon–St-Cergue–Morez (NStCM), acquired in 1992
B23-24		2'2'	SIG	1915	ex-Nyon–St-Cergue–Morez (NStCM), acquired in 1985
BC52		2'2'	SWS	1918	ex-Nyon–St-Cergue–Morez (NStCM), acquired in 1985
B61-62		2'2'	D+B	1922	ex-Nyon–St-Cergue–Morez (NStCM), acquired in 1985
B49, AB98		2'2'		1943-46	ex-Chemin de fer Montreux Oberland-Bernois (MOB), acquired in 1998
B32-33,35					ex-Chemin de fer Aigle-Sepey-Diablerets (ASD), acquired in 1988
B242		2'2'			with balcony, ex-Rhätische Bahn (RhB), acquired in 1993
B243-245		2'2'			with balcony, 74 seats, ex-Rhätische Bahn (RhB), acquired in 1997

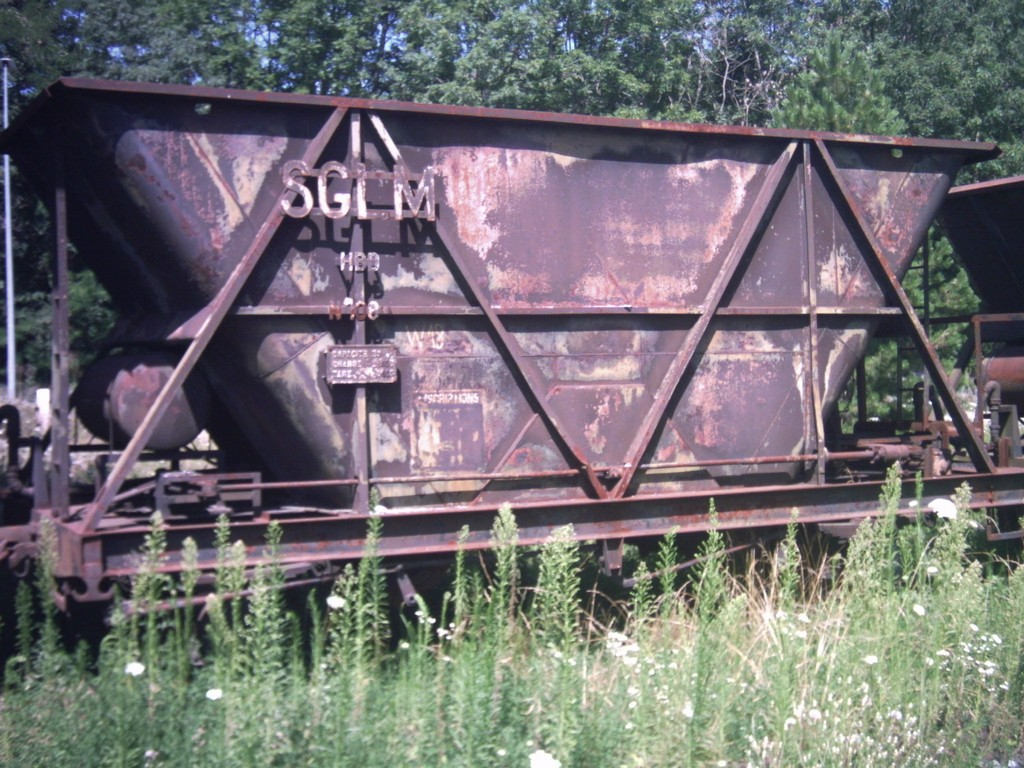
A former coal wagon in the station at La Motte d'Aveillans

=== Freight cars ===
No.	Name	Wheelsets	Builders Details	Date Built	Notes.
		3	FL	1888-1906	10 Ton Coal-wagons, gondolas and side-door vans
		3	CB	1908-1913	100x 15Ton Coal-wagons and side-door vans
		3	CFMCF	1932	10 Ton Coal-wagons and side-door vans. In total there were 373 10 ton cars delivered in 1888-1906 and 1932.
N10xx	HBD	2	Richard	1961	23 m3, 21,4 ton, 72x coal-wagons and side-door vans, 20 wagons were sold to Madagascar and 5 to the Brig-Visp-Zermatt (BVZ).

== Abbreviations - railroad companies ==
- NStCM.....Chemin de fer Nyon-St-Cergue-Morez
- VFD.......Voies ferrées du Dauphiné

== Abbreviations - manufacturers ==
- ANF.......Ateliers du nord de la france
- B+L.......Brissonneau and Lotz, Creil, France
- BBC.......Brown, Boveri & Cie
- CB........Chantiers de La Buire, Lyon, France
- CGC.......Compagnie General Construction, St. Denis, France
- CFMCF.....Compagnie Française de Matériel de Chemin de Fer, Maubeuge, France
- D+B.......Dyle et Bacalan
- FL........Compagnie de Fives-Lille, Givors, France
- Ren.......Renault
- Richard...Etablissements Richard, St. Denis de l'Hôtel (Loiret), France
- SIG.......Schweizerische Industriegesellschaft, Neuhausen am Rheinfall, Switzerland (now Alstom)
- SWS.......Schweizerische Wagons- und Aufzügefabrik AG Schlieren-Zürich, Switzerland (closed)
- T-H.......Compagnie Francaise Thomson-Houston (Nowadays: Alstom)
- Thury.....Ateliers Rene Thury, Geneva. (Later: S.A. Ateliers Secheron (SAAS))
