= John L. McAtee =

US judge

J. L. McAtee
- Born: John Lind McAtee; June 25, 1841; Smithsburg, Maryland
- Died: June 13, 1904 (aged 62); Chicago, Illinois
- Other name: John L. McAtee
- Occupations: Cattle rancher; attorney; Justice of the Oklahoma Territorial Supreme Court
- Years active: 1878–1903
- Known for: Justice of the Oklahoma Territorial Supreme Court (1894-1902)

John Lind McAtee (1841–1904) was born to William Brady and Anna A. (née Boyd) McAtee near Smithsburg, Maryland, on June 25, 1841. (Note: The subject's name is more often written as J. L. McAtee or John L. McAtee.) John's grandfather was Thomas McAtee who had served in the Continental Army during the American Revolutionary War, along with his three brothers. Their ancestors had emigrated to Maryland from Ireland in 1640. His grandmother, Jane Brady McAtee, was a cousin of William Henry Harrison, who became President of the United States of America. The McAtees settled near Port Colony and, along with three other families, built the first Roman Catholic Church there.

== Early life and education ==
McAtee reportedly prepared for a college education by attending Academia (a Presbyterian school in Juniata, Pennsylvania) and the Episcopal Diocesan College of St. James (near the present Hagerstown, Maryland). He enrolled in Princeton University in the fall of 1858, joining the class of 1862. However, his eyesight began to fail at the start of the sophomore year, unable to read a line. Although he was under the care of various oculists and opticians for the next 16 years, evidently they were unable to diagnose the cause of his problem nor find a cure. McAtee returned to Princeton in the fall of 1861, still unable to read, but was permitted to join the Class of 1863, answer roll call as being in classes, and hear the lectures. (Note: It is unclear whether he earned a degree despite these restrictions.)

== Life in Maryland ==
In February, 1870, McAtee bought an estate near Williamsport, Maryland. He married Mary Ella McMurray of Lansingburgh, New York. They had six children, only four of whom survived to adulthood. His eyesight gradually improved over the next five years. In 1875, he decided to return to his studies of law. He enrolled at the University of Maryland Law Department, and graduated at the head of his class in May, 1878. After graduation, he began working in a partnership with Andrew K. Syester, Attorney General for the State of Maryland, but soon found that his eyes were not yet strong enough to bear the strain of full-time legal work.

== Move to Indian Territory ==
McAtee decided that he should go west to search for success. He bought a cattle ranch in Indian Territory in 1893 and settled in one of the areas newly opened for settlement. It was, however, a far harder environment than Maryland in which to live. His wife died on August 10, 1893. There were plenty of opportunities for an ambitious and experienced lawyer, and he apparently took advantage of the fact. By 1894, he had come to the attention of President Grover Cleveland, who appointed him to the Territorial Supreme Court. In 1896, President William McKinley renewed his appointment.

McAtee, though initially appointed by a Democratic President, strongly agreed with the Republican President's policies on the Philippines, finance, expansion and prosperity. McAtee was invited to defend McKinley's views in a debate on "Imperialism" at a meeting of the Oklahoma Bar Association in January 1900. His defense was so successful that the President began to request that McAtee be his spokesman before several other groups, such as the National Catholic Summer School at Detroit in August and even to deliver the Presidential address at Arlington on Memorial Day.

On May 30, 1902, President Theodore Roosevelt named James K. Beauchamp to replace McAtee as the Fifth Circuit judge.

== Death ==
Judge McAtee died on June 13, 1904, after a 4-day illness from paralysis caused by a brain hemorrhage. It was thought that the hemorrhage may have been due to a 2-month illness of neuritis, which the judge had suffered earlier in the year. He was survived by a son and a daughter.

The following information was originally printed in The Oklahoman on June 1, 1904:

Enid, Okla., June 13. – John L. McAtee, aged 61, and for seven years United States district judge for the Fifth judicial district of Oklahoma, with residence in Enid, died this morning in the Great Northern hotel at Chicago of paralysis. For the past two years Judge McAtee has been a member of a law firm in Oklahoma City, his eldest son John L. McAtee, Jr., resides in Kansas City, where the remains of the deceased will be interred. His daughter, always his companion, was with him at the time of passing.
