= Laura Bon =

Italian stage actress

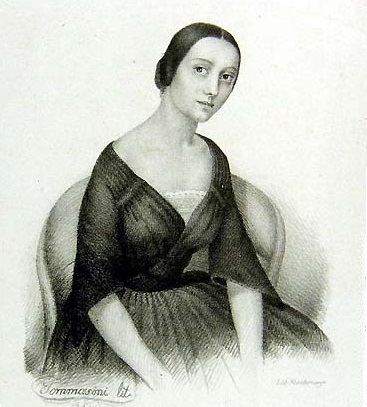
A portrait of Laura Bon

Laura Bon (25 October 1824– 24 July 1905) was an Italian stage actress.

== Life ==
Laura Bon was born in Turin on 25 October 1824, the daughter of Francesco Augusto Bon (1788–1858), and Luigia Ristori (1803–1846). She was the lover of Victor Emmanuel II of Italy between 1844 and 1858, and had a daughter with him, named Emanuela (1853-1890). She resumed her acting career in 1858, and enjoyed a successful stage career until the 1870s. She died in Venice, on 24 July 1905, aged 81.
