= James K. Beauchamp =

American lawyer

- Born: April 22, 1859; Viola, Delaware
- Died: November 25, 1935 (aged 76); Kansas City, Kansas
- Occupations: Attorney, Judge
- Years active: 1879-1935
- Known for: Probate judge; county attorney; Justice of Oklahoma Territory Supreme Court

James K. Beauchamp (1859–1935), a native of Delaware, moved to Missouri in 1871, with his parents where they became farmers. He also read the law in the offices of a local law firm until he passed the bar exam in 1879. He moved to Kansas for a year, but a period of poor health forced him to return to Missouri. In 1893, he joined the opening of the Cherokee Outlet in Oklahoma Territory, where he secured a homestead in Enid. He was elected Garfield County probate judge in 1898, serving until he was appointed Associate Justice of the Oklahoma Territory in 1902. He resigned from that position, which would be eliminated when Oklahoma was granted statehood in 1907, and went back to the private practice of law in Enid.

== Early life ==
James K. Beauchamp was born to James H. Beauchamp and Lydia (née Lank) on April 22, 1859, in Viola Kent County, Delaware. He received his formal education in the Delaware Public Schools. He and his parents moved to Brookfield, Linn County, Missouri, in the spring of 1871, where they began farming. Young James also began reading law at the Brookfield offices of Houston & Brownlee. He was admitted to the Linn County Bar in June 1879. He then moved to Salina, Kansas, where he opened a partnership with Hon. R. A. Lovett. The firm Lovett & Beauchamp dissolved in the fall of 1880, because of health problems that forced Beauchamp to return to Missouri, where he resumed a private law practice in Breckinridge, Caldwell County, Missouri, until 1885. Beauchamp then moved to Liberal in Seward County, Kansas, where he would remain until 1893. During that period, he was elected County Attorney for Seward County.

== Move to Oklahoma ==
In September 1893, Beauchamp resigned his County Attorney position so that he could participate in the opening of the Cherokee Strip in the neighboring Oklahoma Territory. He was successful in claiming a plot of land in the newly created town of Enid, Garfield County, Oklahoma. This would become his permanent home. He was elected as Garfield County's probate judge in 1898, and would be reelected in 1900.

In May 1902, President Theodore Roosevelt appointed Beauchamp as an Associate Justice of the Oklahoma Territory Supreme Court, where he would serve for four years. He then retired to the private practice of law in Enid, partnering with his son-in-law, Robert L. Denton.

== Death ==
James K. Beauchamp reportedly died November 25, 1935, at Kansas City, Kansas. He was buried in Mt. Morijah Cemetery in the same city. His wife, Tirza F. (née Huxtable) Beauchamp, died in Kansas City, Kansas December 10, 1939, and is buried next her husband.
