= La Motte-d'Aveillans =

- Commune
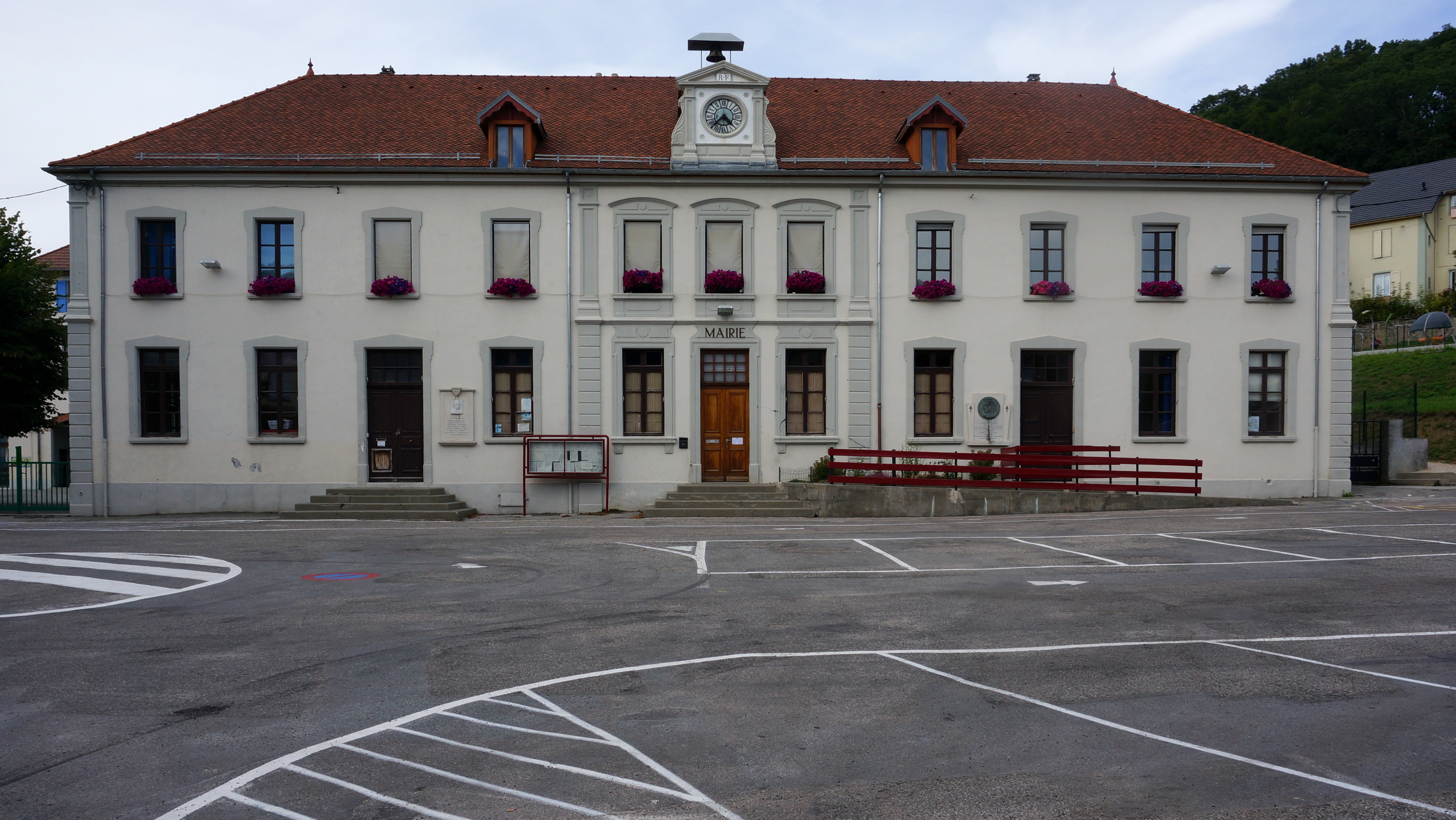
- Town hall
- Location of La Motte-d'Aveillans
- Location within France Location within Auvergne-Rhône-Alpes
- Coordinates: 44°57′43″N 5°44′45″E
- Country: France
- Region: Auvergne-Rhône-Alpes
- Department: Isère
- Arrondissement: Grenoble
- Canton: Matheysine-Trièves
- Intercommunality: La Matheysine

Government
  - Mayor (2020–2026): Angélique Rojas
- Area^{1}: 10 km^{2} (3.9 sq mi)
- Elevation: 872 m (2,861 ft)
- Highest elevation: 1,617 m (5,305 ft)
- Lowest elevation: 637 m (2,090 ft)
- Population (2023): 1,711
  - Density: 170/km^{2} (440/sq mi)
- Time zone: UTC+01:00 (CET)
  - Summer (DST): UTC+02:00 (CEST)
- INSEE/Postal code: 38265 /38770
- ^{1} French Land Register data, which excludes lakes, ponds, glaciers > 1 km^{2} (0.386 sq mi or 247 acres) and river estuaries.

La Motte-d'Aveillans is a commune in the Isère department in southeastern France.

== Population ==
Historical population
Year	Pop.	±% p.a.
1968	2,410	—
1975	1,778	−4.25%
1982	1,677	−0.83%
1990	1,591	−0.66%
1999	1,523	−0.48%
2007	1,808	+2.17%
2012	1,772	−0.40%
2017	1,712	−0.69%
2023	1,711	−0.01%
Source: INSEE

== See also ==
- Communes of the Isère department
- Chemin de fer de La Mure
