= Carleton Bass =

Irish bullfighter

Ernest Carleton Bass (1876 – 8 June 1904), best-known as Carleton Bass, born in Ireland, was a notorious bullfighter in the United States who billed himself in the late 19th and early 20th centuries as the "first North American bullfighter." In reality, he was an Irish immigrant who never became an American citizen, and his anemic bullfighting skill led to him being booed from bullfighting rings in Mexico. Though he had learned some swordfighting and bullfighting skills in Spain before he emigrated to the United States, he was a poor fighter. In 1903, he suffered an attack of nerves before a fight in Mexico and failed to fight. In 1904, he was a key figure in the St. Louis bullfight riot, which led to the destruction of a 14,000-seat arena by fire. Two days after the riot, he shot and killed fellow matador Manuel Cervera Prieto after the other man attacked Bass with a knife over a dispute regarding the bullfight canceled by the riot. A subsequent coroner's inquest found Bass acted in self-defense and should not be charged with murder. Following his acquittal, Bass went on to star in several bloodless bullfights. These involved enraging the bull, causing it to charge and miss, but not spearing it or cutting it with a sword.
