= Frank Runacres =

British painter

Frank Runacres (2 June 1904 - 1974) was an English painter who worked in both watercolours and oil. He studied at Saint Martin's School of Art, at the Slade School of Fine Arts, and at the Royal College of Art under Sir William Rothenstein between 1930 and 1933.

He taught at the Hornsey College of Art.

== Works ==
Frank Runacres' paintings show rolling rural landscapes in Kent and Somerset, and boats and rocky seascapes in Plymouth. He made a number of studies of Richmond Bridge.

== Exhibitions ==
Between 1937 and 1965, Frank Runacres exhibited 18 paintings at the Royal Academy. He also exhibited at the Manchester City Art Gallery, Leicester Galleries and the NEAC.

== Character ==
Frank Runacres gave paintings to nephews and nieces as wedding presents. The gift was usually presented after a visit and tea at his home by the Thames in Richmond. In this way Runacres met, at least once, the new family member.
