= Arne Yven =

Norwegian footballer (1904–1970)

Personal information
- Full name: Arne Jensen Yven
- Date of birth: 18 July 1904
- Place of birth: Sarpsborg, Norway
- Date of death: 7 September 1970 (aged 66)
- Position: Forward

Senior career*
Years	Team	Apps	(Gls)
- Sarpsborg FK

International career
1933	Norway	1	(0)
- * Club domestic league appearances and goals

Arne Jensen Yven (18 July 1904 – 7 September 1970) was a Norwegian footballer who played as a forward. He made one appearance for the Norway national team in 1933.
