= Longville, California =

Unincorporated community in California, United States

Longville
- Unincorporated community
- Location in California Longville (the United States)
- Coordinates: 40°08′52″N 121°14′41″W
- Country: United States
- State: California
- County: Plumas
- Elevation: 4,400 ft (1,341 m)

Longville is an unincorporated community in Plumas County, California, United States. It lies at an elevation of 4400 feet (1341 m). Longville is located 6 miles (9.7 km) southwest of Almanor.

The Longville post office operated from 1861 to 1918. The name honors W.B. Long hotelier and saw mill owner.
