= Eugénie Joubert =

French Roman Catholic nun

Blessed Eugénie Joubert

Religious
- Born: 11 February 1876; Yssingeaux, Haute-Loire, French Third Republic
- Died: 2 July 1904 (aged 28); Liège, Belgium
- Venerated in: Roman Catholic Church
- Beatified: 20 November 1994, Saint Peter's Square, Vatican City by Pope John Paul II
- Feast: 2 July
- Attributes: Religious habit

Eugénie Joubert (11 February 1876 – 2 July 1904) was a French Roman Catholic professed religious from the Sisters of the Holy Family of the Sacred Heart. Joubert lived a short life - she died due to tuberculosis but her life was noted for her staunch devotion to the Mother of God and her commitment to her spiritual cultivation was well known and admired.

The cause for sainthood started under Pope Pius XI on 1 June 1938 - she was titled as a Servant of God - and the confirmation of her life of heroic virtue allowed for Pope John Paul II to name her as Venerable on 9 June 1983; that same pope beatified her on 20 November 1994.

== Life ==
Eugénie Joubert was born in 1876 to Pierre Joubert and Antonia Celle as the fourth of eight children in France.

Joubert and her elder sister were placed in a boarding school that the Ursulines managed at Ministrel - both grew fond of their time there and came to like their experiences. She made her First Communion in 1888. On 6 October 1895 she joined a religious order at Aubervilliers (near Paris) and began as a postulant and then commenced her period of the novitiate; her mother bid her farewell and said: "Don't look back but become a saint!". On 13 August 1896 she received the habit from the order's founder Jesuit Louis-Etienne Rabussier and made her profession to him on 8 September 1897; he followed the Spiritual Exercises twice in her novitiate. She was in Rome from April 1903 until May 1904 and then moved to Belgium.

Joubert began to suffer from tuberculosis since 1902 and died from it in Belgium in 1904. She had once collapsed from exhaustion after suffering a haemorrhage. Her breathing grew much more labored in her final hours and she was presented with an image of the Child Jesus to which she uttered her final words: "Jesus ... Jesus ... Jesus".

She was buried in the cemetery of Saint-Gilles in Liège (Belgium). In 1948 her tomb was transferred to Dinant (Belgium), where the motherhouse of her congregation was located. When the Sisters of the Holy Family of the Sacred Heart left Dinant and Belgium, they Eugénie Joubert's grave in the church which has become the chapel of a retirement home. On June 30, 2024, under the patronage of Monsignor Jean-Pierre Delville, Bishop of the Diocese of Liège, the grave of Blessed Eugénie Joubert was returned to the church of St. Gilles in Liège, in a chapel dedicated to her.

== Beatification ==
The beatification process opened in an informative process spanning from 1919 to 1923 and her writings received formal approval on 28 April 1936; the formal introduction of the cause came under Pope Pius XI on 1 June 1938 and she was titled as a Servant of God. The Congregation for Rites validated the informative process on 18 April 1958 and the consultants and members of the Congregation for the Causes of Saints approved the cause on 1 December 1982; the C.C.S. alone later approved it on 12 April 1983. Pope John Paul II confirmed her heroic virtue and named her as Venerable on 9 June 1983.

The miracle for beatification was investigated and then ratified on 30 October 1987 at which point a medical board approved it on 8 October 1992; theologians followed on 11 December 1992 as did the C.C.S. on 16 February 1993. John Paul II approved it and then beatified Joubert on 20 November 1994.

The postulator for the cause of her beatification process was Fr. Charles Cauty-Ancel (+ 2017).
