= St. Louis bullfight riot =

Coordinates: 38.65°N 90.30°W

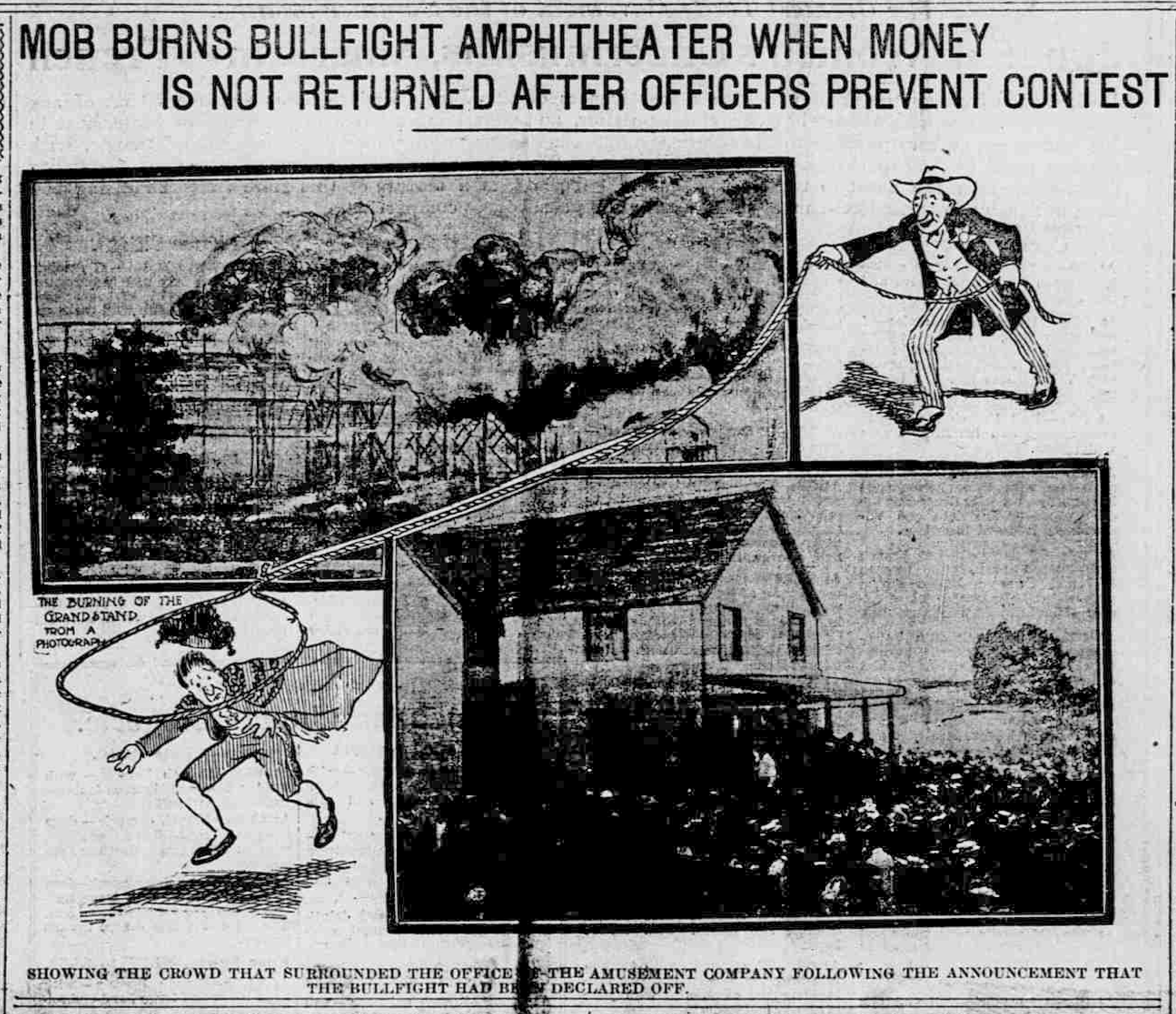
This photoillustration from the front page of the June 6, 1904 issue of the St. Louis Republic newspaper illustrates the burning of the Norris Amusement Company arena during the St. Louis bullfight riot contemporary to the 1904 World's Fair.

On June 5, 1904, thousands rioted in St. Louis, Missouri, north of the 1904 World's Fair, after a bullfight was canceled by court order. The St. Louis bullfight riot injured a handful of people and burned down the Norris Amusement Company arena, disrupting the World's Fair for one day.

== Background ==
Promoter Richard Norris advertised bullfights on June 5, 1904, capitalizing on the spirit of the World's Fair. He built an eponymous 16,000-seat arena, and contracted Spanish bullfighter Manuel Cervera Prieto and 35 others. Norris sold more than 8,000 $1 tickets.

Bullfighting was illegal in the United States and the state of Missouri. The St. Louis Humane Society pleaded with governor Alexander Monroe Dockery to "avert this flagrant outrage upon the civilization of the State of Missouri and of the United States." Religious organizations including the Congregational State Association of Missouri joined them. Under pressure one day before the fight, Dockery ordered St. Louis County's prosecuting attorney to arrest all violators of the state's anti-bullfighting law.

== Riot ==
The World's Fair was closed on the Sunday of the fight. The fair's Wild West opened with horsemanship followed by lacrosse but the crowd became restless.

The announcer's introduction of Cervera was interrupted by a deputy sheriff arriving and declaring the fight prohibited. The police and organizers were negotiating in the office, but deprived of refunds, the crowd threw rocks through the windows.

During the fracas, a man on the office porch demanded a refund and was injured by a rock. Others inside were injured by broken glass. Police with drawn pistols deterred rioters but were too few to keep the mob from the arena grandstand. Once in the arena, rioters released three bulls. The bulls' emaciation and nonaggression suggested no fight was planned. Rioters ignited straw in the bullpen, and flames leapt to the grandstand made of pine and tar paper.

== Aftermath ==
Despite police and firefighters responding from the nearby World's Fairgrounds, the arena burned to the ground. Several rioters were arrested for arson. Two days later, Cervera was killed by fellow bullfighter Carleton Bass over remuneration. The bullfighters subsequently asserted that Norris never planned a bullfight.
